= 2026 Navajo Nation presidential election =

- July 21, 2026 (Primary); November 3, 2026 (Run off)
- Turnout: 34.48% (Primary)
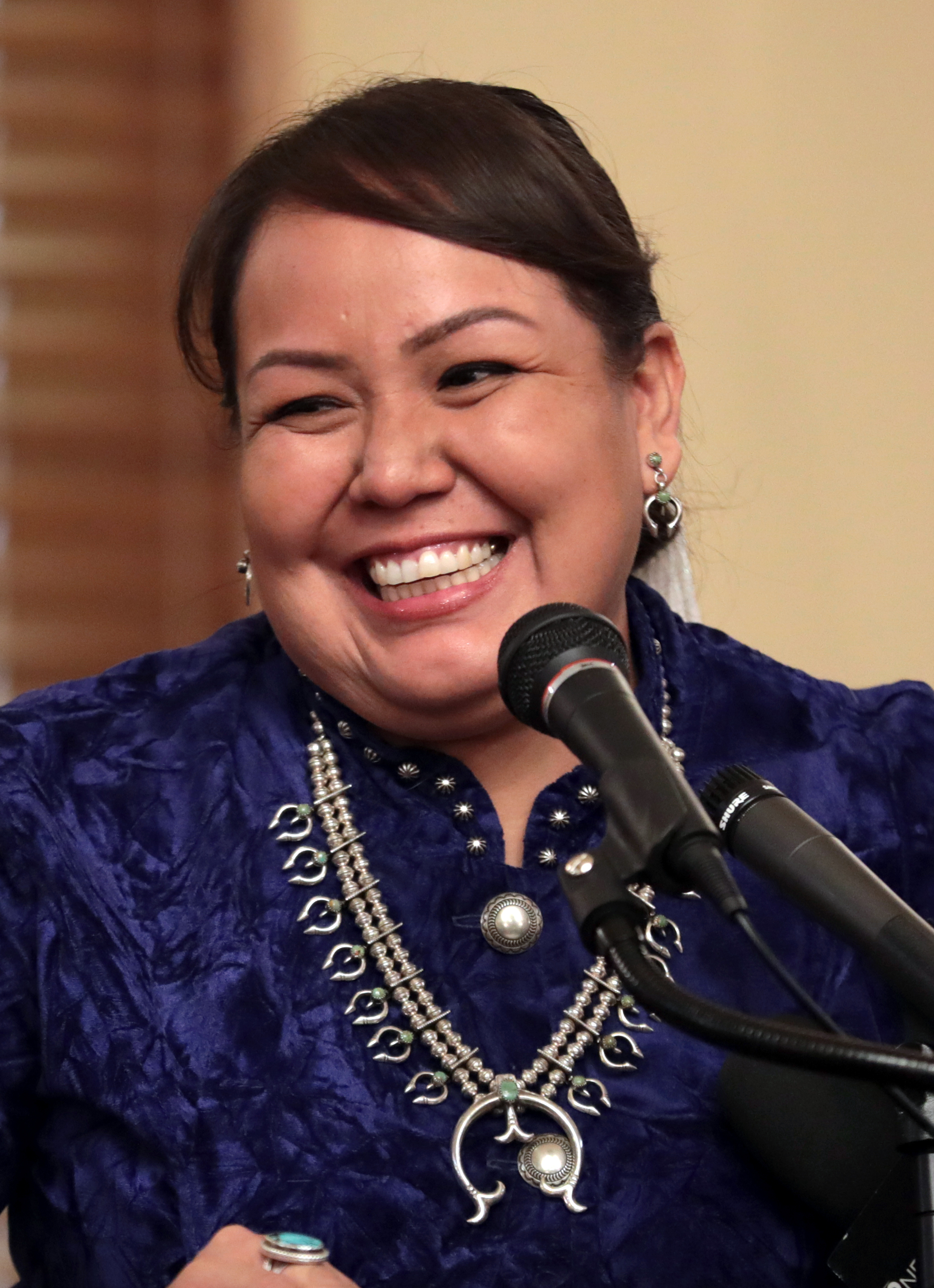

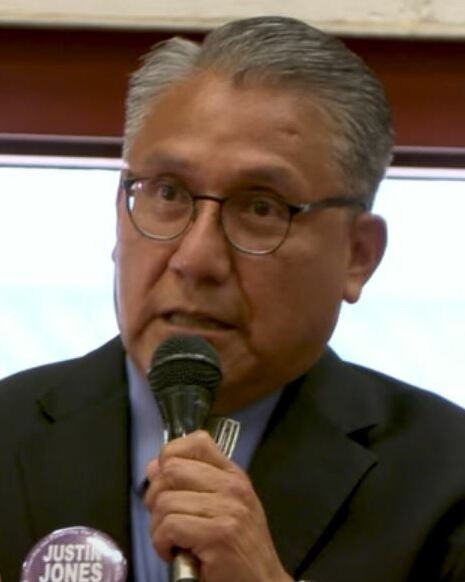

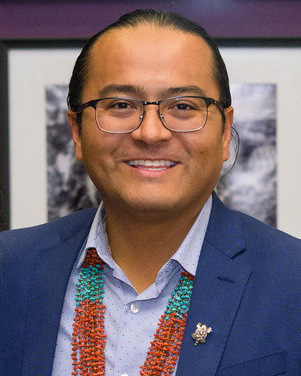

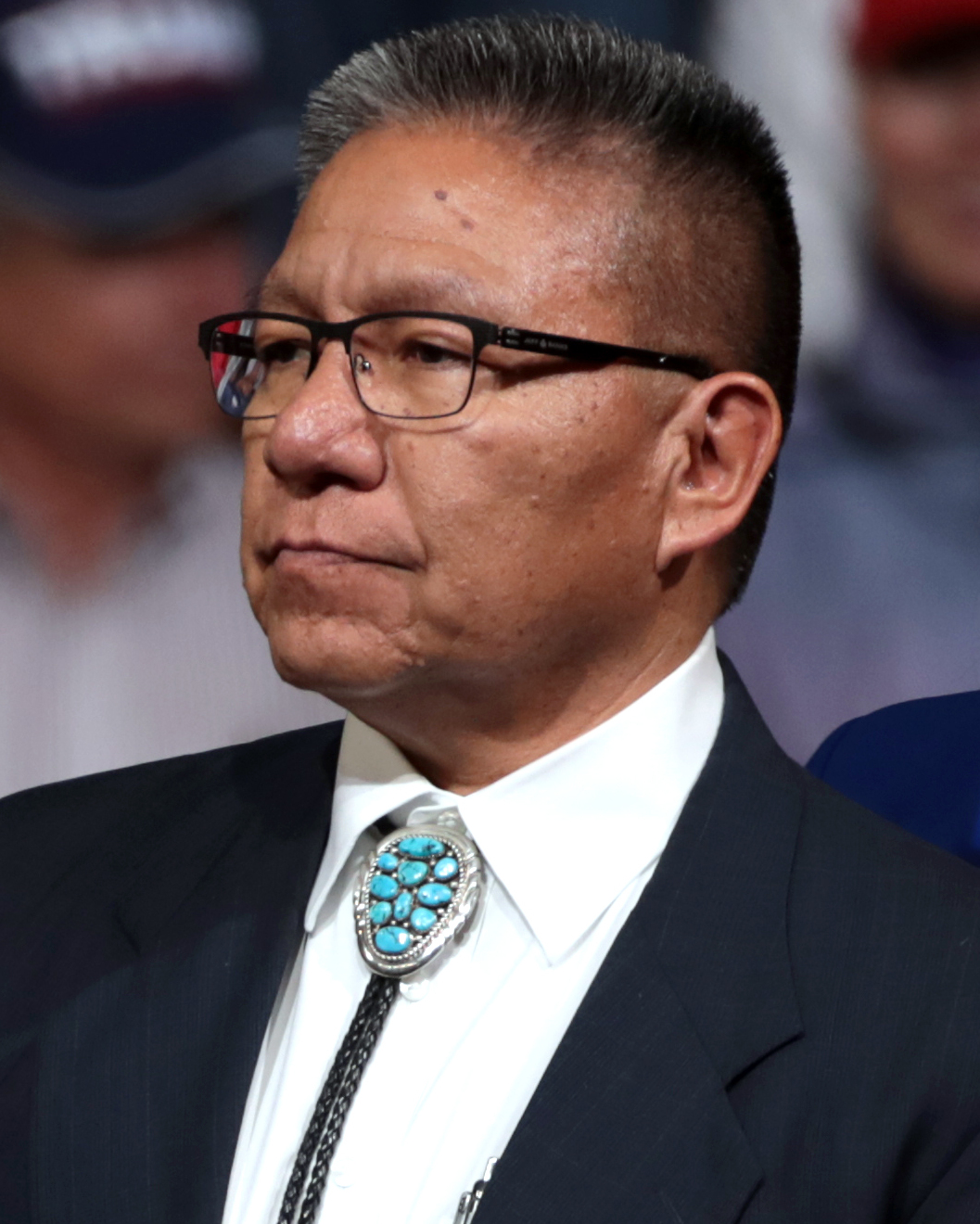
Candidate	Crystalyne Curley	Justin Jones	Buu Nygren
Running mate	Chris Deschene	Emily Ellison	N/A
Primary election	8,670; 17.77%	15,098; 30.94%	7,430; 15.23%
General election	32,094; 50.88%	30,979; 49.12%	Eliminated
Candidate	Tom Chee	Andrew Curley	Myron Lizer
Primary election	4,207; 8.62%	3,354; 6.87%	2,685; 5.50%
General election	Eliminated	Eliminated	Eliminated
President and Vice President before election
Buu Nygren
Richelle Montoya
Elected President and Vice President
Crystalyne Curley
Chris Deschene

The 2026 Navajo Nation presidential election took place on Tuesday, November 3, 2026, to elect the president and vice president of the Navajo Nation. The primary election was held on June 2 in New Mexico, June 23 in Utah, and July 21 in Arizona to align with each state's primary elections. The primary election coincided with primary elections for the Navajo Nation Council, Navajo Board of Election Supervisors, and Navajo Nation Board of Education. The general election coincided with elections for the aforementioned offices and federal and state offices.

Justin Jones, an attorney who previously ran in 2022, and Crystalyne Curley, the incumbent Speaker of the Navajo Nation Council, advanced to the general election. Jones picked nonprofit executive director Emily Ellison, who was eliminated in the primary and had previously ran in 2018 and 2022, as his running mate. Curley picked attorney and former Arizona representative Chris Deschene, who had previously ran in 2014, as her running mate. Jones previously represented a presidential candidate who successfully challenged Deschene's candidacy on the basis of his lack of fluency in the Navajo language, a requirement at the time. Curley won in the general election, becoming the first woman elected Navajo president.

Sixteen candidates ran for president, one of the largest fields in tribal history. Incumbent president Buu Nygren, who was seeking a second term, was eliminated in the primary. Incumbent vice president Richelle Montoya did not seek reelection, instead running unsuccessfully for a seat in the Navajo Nation Council.

This is the first election to be conducted under tribal legislation CJA-08-24, which amended Title 11 of the Navajo Nation Code to raise the campaign expense limit from US$1.50 to US$2 per registered voter.

== Candidates ==
=== Advanced to general election ===
- Justin Jones, attorney and candidate for president in 2022 (from Rock Point)
  - Emily Ellison, nonprofit executive director and candidate for president in 2018, 2022, and 2026 (from Chichiltah)
- Crystalyne Curley, Speaker of the Navajo Nation Council (since 2023; from Tselani/Cottonwood)
  - Chris Deschene, former Arizona state representative (2009–2011) and candidate for president in 2014 (party affiliation: Democratic)

=== Eliminated in primary ===
- Donovan Begay (from Huerfano)
- Jordan Begay, former social worker for the Navajo Nation Division for Children and Family Services (from Tonalea)
- Alexander Chambers, advisor for the US Small Business Administration (from Shiprock)
- Tom T. Chee (from Shiprock)
- Kevin L. Cody, tribal employee and candidate for president in 2018 and 2022 (from Pinon)
- Andrew Curley, Associate Professor at the University of Arizona (from Houck)
- Frank Dayish, former vice president of the Navajo Nation (2003–2007) and candidate for president in 2022 (from Chichiltah)
- Emily Ellison, nonprofit executive director and candidate for president in 2018 and 2022 (from Chichiltah)
- Myron Lizer, former vice president of the Navajo Nation (2019–2023; from St. Michaels) (party affiliation: Republican)
- Debbie Nez-Manuel, candidate for the Arizona House of Representatives in 2018 and Arizona Senate in 2020 (from Klagetoh)
- Larry Noble (from Steamboat)
- Buu Nygren, incumbent president (since 2023; from Red Mesa) (party affiliation: Democratic)
- Johnny Russell Jr. (from Nageezi)
- Arvin S. Trujillo, Navajo Nation executive administrator (from Gadii'ahi/To'Koi)

== Results ==
Candidate	Running mate	Primary		General	
Candidate	Running mate	Votes	%	Votes	%
Justin Jones	Emily Ellison	15,098	30.94	30,979	49.12
Crystalyne Curley	Chris Deschene	8,670	17.77	32,094	50.88
Buu Nygren	—	7,430	15.23		
Tom T. Chee	—	4,207	8.62		
Andrew Curley	—	3,354	6.87		
Myron Lizer	—	2,685	5.50		
Arvin S. Trujillo	—	1,714	3.51		
Frank Dayish	—	1,329	2.72		
Dr. Jordan Begay	—	1,004	2.06		
Alexander Chambers	—	964	1.98		
Larry Noble	—	707	1.45		
Debbie Nez-Manuel	—	654	1.34		
Emily Ellison	—	399	0.82		
Johnny Russell Jr.	—	222	0.46		
Kevin L. Cody	—	178	0.36		
Donovan Begay	—	176	0.36		
Total		48,791	100.00	63,073	100.00
