= Vice President of the Navajo Nation =

Position in the Navajo Nation government

Vice-President of the Navajo Nation
- Great Seal of the Navajo Nation
- Incumbent; Richelle Montoya since January 10, 2023
- Residence: Window Rock, AZ
- Term length: Four years, renewable once
- Constituting instrument: Navajo Nation Code & Treaty of 1868
- Inaugural holder: Marshall Plummer
- Formation: January 15, 1991
- Salary: $45,000.00 USD per year
- Website: Vice President

The office of vice president of the Navajo Nation was created in 1991 following restructuring of the Navajo Nation government. The president and vice president are elected every four years. The Navajo Nation vice president shall serve no more than two terms.

In 2010, Ben Shelly became the first vice president to be elected president of the Navajo Nation.

The incumbent vice president is Richelle Montoya, who took office on January 10, 2023, after winning the 2022 election. Montoya was the first woman to be elected into the executive branch of the Navajo Nation. The vice president-elect is Chris Deschene, who won the 2026 election and is scheduled to take office on January 12, 2027.

== Officeholders ==
| No. | Vice President | Took office | Left office | Tenure | Party (Note: Presidential elections in the Navajo Nation are nonpartisan. The parties listed here are for informational purposes only.) | Election | President (Note: Vice presidents belong to the same party as the presidents they served under, unless otherwise noted.) |
|---|---|---|---|---|---|---|---|
| 1 | Marshall Plummer (1948–2010) | January 15, 1991 | January 10, 1995 | 3 years, 360 days | Unknown | 1990 | Peterson Zah (Note: Represented the Democratic Party.) |
| 2 | Thomas Atcitty (1933–2020) | January 10, 1995 | February 19, 1998 (Note: Atcitty acceded to the presidency when President Albert Hale resigned to avoid prosecution for 50 felonies and misdemeanors related to theft and bribery.) | 3 years, 40 days | Democratic | 1994 | Albert Hale |
| 3 | Milton Bluehouse Sr. (1936–2019) | February 19, 1998 | July 24, 1998 (Note: Bluehouse acceded to the presidency when President Thomas Atcitty was removed by the Navajo Nation Council for violating ethics codes.) | 155 days | Unknown | – | Thomas Atcitty |
| Vacant | | July 24, 1998 | August 1998 | | | | Milton Bluehouse Sr. (Note: Political affiliation is unknown.) |
| 4 | Frank Chee Willeto (1925–2012) | August 1998 (Note: The exact date Willeto took office as vice president is unknown.) | January 12, 1999 | 4–5 months | Unknown | – | Milton Bluehouse Sr. |
| 5 | Taylor McKenzie (1931–2007) | January 12, 1999 | January 14, 2003 | 4 years, 2 days | Unknown | 1998 | Kelsey Begaye |
| 6 | Frank Dayish (born 1958) | January 14, 2003 | January 9, 2007 | 3 years, 360 days | Unknown | 2002 | Joe Shirley Jr. |
| 7 | Ben Shelly (1947–2023) | January 9, 2007 | January 11, 2011 | 4 years, 2 days | Democratic | 2006 | Joe Shirley Jr. |
| 8 | Rex Lee Jim (1962–2026) | January 11, 2011 | May 12, 2015 | 4 years, 121 days | Unknown | 2010 | Ben Shelly |
| 9 | Jonathan Nez (born 1975) | May 12, 2015 | January 15, 2019 | 3 years, 248 days | Democratic | 2014–15 | Russell Begaye |
| 10 | Myron Lizer (born TBA) | January 15, 2019 | January 10, 2023 | 3 years, 360 days | Republican | 2018 | Jonathan Nez |
| 11 | Richelle Montoya (born TBA) | January 10, 2023 | Incumbent (Note: Montoya ran unsuccessfully for a seat on the Navajo Nation Council. Her tenure as vice president is set to expire on January 12, 2027.) | 3 years, 298 days | Unknown | 2022 | Buu Nygren |
| 12 | Chris Deschene (born 1970) | Due to take office January 12, 2027 | | −69 days | Democratic | 2026 | Crystalyne Curley |

== See also ==
- President of the Navajo Nation
- Speaker of the Navajo Nation Council
- Navajo Nation Council
