= President of the Navajo Nation =

Head of government of the Navajo Nation

- Diné Binantʼaʼí (Navajo)
- Great Seal of the Navajo Nation

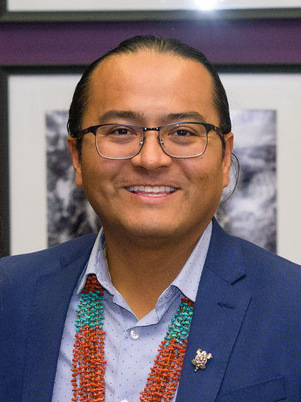
- Incumbent; Buu Nygren since January 10, 2023
- Residence: Window Rock, Arizona
- Term length: Four years, renewable once
- Constituting instrument: Navajo Nation Code & Treaty of 1868
- Inaugural holder: Peterson Zah
- Formation: January 15, 1991
- Salary: 55,000.00 USD per year
- Website: Office of the President and Vice President of the Navajo Nation

The president of the Navajo Nation is the executive branch of the Navajo Nation. The office succeeded that of the tribal chairman, being created during the 1991 restructuring of the Navajo national government. The president and vice president are elected every four years. The Navajo Nation president may serve no more than two consecutive terms.

The shortest presidency was that of Thomas Atcitty, who acceded to the presidency upon the resignation of Albert Hale in February 1998. Atcitty served for 154 days before being removed by the Navajo Nation Council for violating ethics codes. The longest presidency was that of Joe Shirley Jr., who served nearly eight years from 2003 to 2011. Shirley is currently the only president to have been elected to more than one term.

The incumbent president is Buu Nygren, who took office on January 10, 2023, after winning the 2022 election. The president-elect is Crystalyne Curley, who won the 2026 election and is scheduled to take office on January 12, 2027.

== Eligibility ==
According to the Navajo Election Administration, to be eligible to run for Navajo Nation president, candidates must:

- Be a registered voter, a member of the Navajo Nation, and be on the agency census roll of the Bureau of Indian Affairs;
- Be at least 30 years of age;
- Not have been convicted of a felony or misdemeanor involving crimes of deceit, untruthfulness, or dishonesty within the previous five years;
- Not be employed by the Navajo Nation or the United States, nor be an elected official of the United States.

Candidates who meet the above requirements can be disqualified if indicted by a federal grand jury.

Until 1990, candidates had to have served in an elected Navajo Nation office. Until 2006, candidates had to have permanent residence and been physically present in the Navajo Nation for at least three years prior to the election. Until 2016, candidates had to be fluent in the Navajo language; presently, fluency is to be determined by the Navajo voters when they cast ballots.

== Presidential line of succession ==
The Navajo Nation Code defines who may become or act as president upon the absence of a sitting president or a president-elect. Should the president, under circumstances outlined in the Navajo Nation Code at §1005(d)-1006, be unable to serve out his full term, then the vice president shall act in his place for the remainder of the term, or until the president is able to resume his duties. §1006 of the Code instructs, that in the event a vacancy should "occur in the Office of President and Vice President, the Speaker shall serve as President of the Navajo Nation until a special election is held." The speaker does not relinquish his speaker duties whilst acting as interim president.

== List of presidents ==
No.	President	Took office	Left office	Tenure	Party (Note: Presidential elections in the Navajo Nation are nonpartisan. The parties listed here are for informational purposes only.)	Election	Vice President (Note: Vice presidents belong to the same party as the presidents they served under, unless noted.)
1	Peterson Zah (1937–2023)	January 15, 1991	January 10, 1995	3 years, 360 days	Democratic	1990	Marshall Plummer (Note: Political affiliation is unknown.)
2	Albert Hale (1950–2021)	January 10, 1995	February 19, 1998 (Note: Hale resigned in order to avoid facing prosecution for 50 felonies and misdemeanors related to theft and bribery.)	3 years, 40 days	Democratic	1994	Thomas Atcitty
3	Thomas Atcitty (1933–2020)	February 19, 1998	July 23, 1998 (Note: Atcitty was removed by the Navajo Nation Council for violating ethics codes.)	154 days	Democratic	–	Milton Bluehouse Sr.
4	Milton Bluehouse Sr. (1936–2019)	July 24, 1998 (Note: Kelsey Begaye, the incumbent speaker of the Navajo Nation Council, was initially appointed interim president by the Council on July 23, 1998. When Vice President Bluehouse threatened legal action, the Council appointed him interim president the next day.)	January 12, 1999	172 days	Unknown	–	vacant through August 1998
4	Milton Bluehouse Sr. (1936–2019)	July 24, 1998	January 12, 1999	172 days	Unknown	–	Frank Chee Willeto
5	Kelsey Begaye (1951–2021)	January 12, 1999	January 14, 2003	4 years, 2 days	Democratic	1998	Taylor McKenzie
6	Joe Shirley Jr. (born 1947)	January 14, 2003	January 11, 2011	7 years, 362 days	Democratic	2002	Frank Dayish
6	Joe Shirley Jr. (born 1947)	January 14, 2003	January 11, 2011	7 years, 362 days	Democratic	2006	Ben Shelly
7	Ben Shelly (1947–2023)	January 11, 2011	May 12, 2015	4 years, 121 days	Democratic	2010	Rex Lee Jim
8	Russell Begaye (born 1951)	May 12, 2015	January 15, 2019	3 years, 248 days	Democratic	2014–15	Jonathan Nez
9	Jonathan Nez (born 1975)	January 15, 2019	January 10, 2023	3 years, 360 days	Democratic	2018	Myron Lizer (Note: Represented the Republican Party.)
10	Buu Nygren (born 1986)	January 10, 2023	Incumbent (Note: Nygren ran unsuccessfully for re-election. His term is set to expire on January 12, 2027.)	3 years, 298 days	Democratic	2022	Richelle Montoya
11	Crystalyne Curley (born 1985)	Due to take office January 12, 2027		−69 days	Unknown	2026	Chris Deschene (Note: Represented the Democratic Party.)

== See also ==
- Vice President of the Navajo Nation
- Speaker of the Navajo Nation Council
- Navajo Nation Council
