= 2010 Navajo Nation presidential election =

- August 3, 2010 (Primary); November 2, 2010 (Run off)
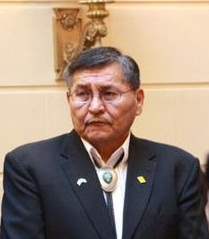

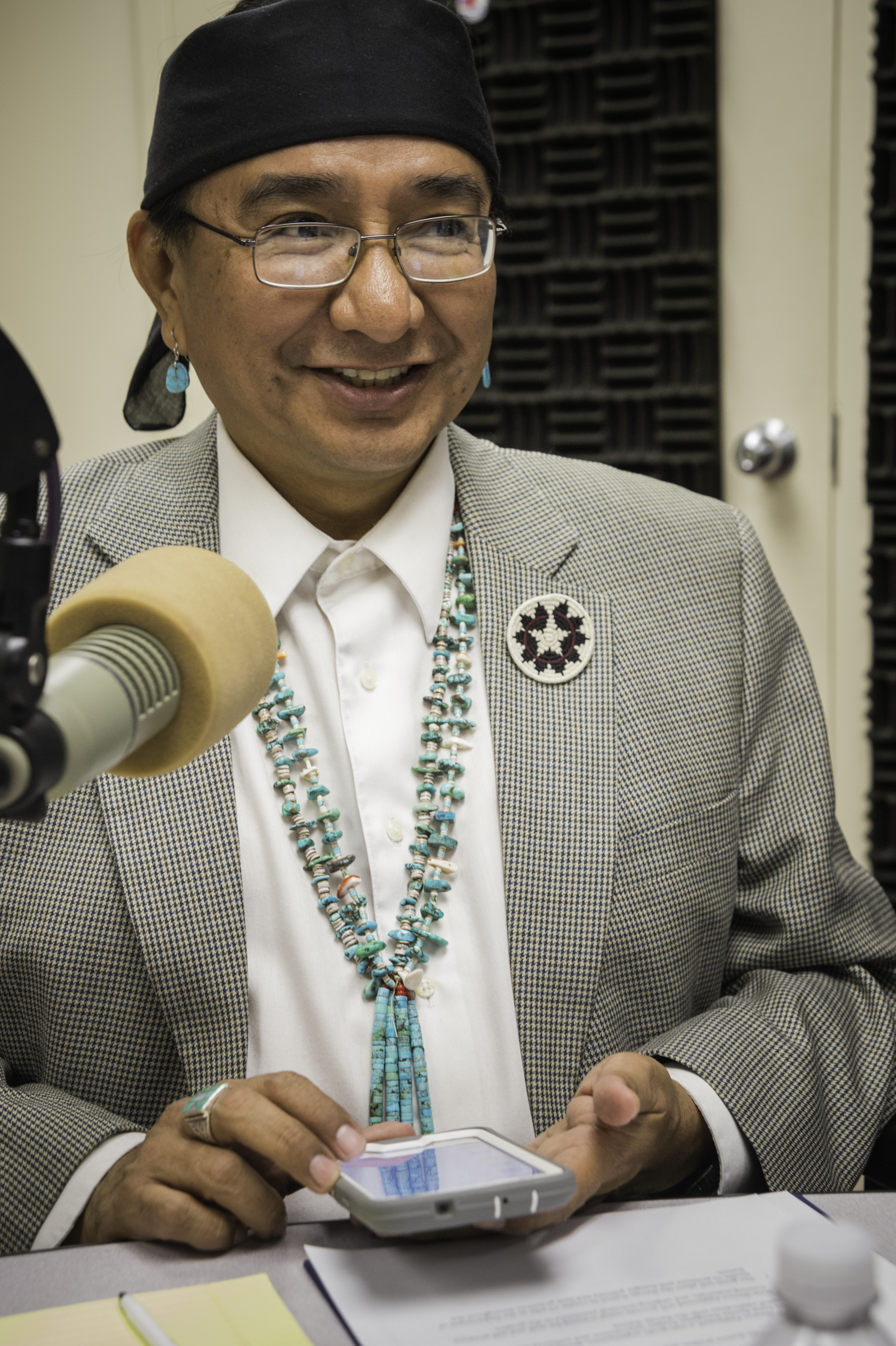

Nominee	Ben Shelly	Lynda Lovejoy	Donald Benally
Running mate	Rex Lee Jim	Earl Tulley	N/A
Primary election	7,715; 16.03%	17,399; 36.13%	6,106; 12.69%
General election	33,734; 52.50%	30,520; 47.50%	Eliminated
Nominee	Rex Lee Jim	Sharon Clahchischilliage	Arbin Mitchell
Running mate	N/A	N/A	N/A
Primary election	4,199; 8.73%	3,171; 6.59%	2,751; 5.72%
General election	Eliminated	Eliminated	Elimminated
President before election
Joe Shirley, Jr.
Ben Shelly
Elected President
Ben Shelly
Rex Lee Jim

The Navajo Nation presidential election of 2010 was held on Tuesday, November 2, 2010. Ben Shelly won the election.

The general election was held between New Mexico State Senator Lynda Lovejoy and outgoing Navajo Nation Vice President Ben Shelly.

The primary election was held on August 3, 2010. Lynda Lovejoy won a plurality of the vote, becoming the first woman to do so. Ben Shelly came in second place. The primary election included nine other candidates. This was the first Navajo Nation presidential election in which both candidates, Lovejoy and Shelly, were residents of the Eastern part of the Navajo Nation.

Ben Shelly became the first Vice President of the Navajo Nation to be elected president. Had she been elected, Lynda Lovejoy would have become the first female president of the Navajo Nation.

Previously, during the 2006 presidential election Joe Shirley Jr. had been re-elected to a second term over challenger Lynda Lovejoy. On July 9, 2010, the Navajo Nation Supreme Court ruled that Shirley could not seek a third consecutive term as president.

== Candidates ==
=== General election ===
- Lynda Lovejoy, of Crownpoint, New Mexico, New Mexico State Senator, District 22
  - Earl Tulley, chosen as Lovejoy's running mate for Vice President on August 8, 2010, activist and administrator.
- Ben Shelly of Thoreau, New Mexico, Vice President of the Navajo Nation
  - Rex Lee Jim, chosen as Shelly's running mate for Vice President on August 8, 2010.

=== Announced and defeated in primary ===
- Anthony Begay, of Mariano Lake, New Mexico, Mariano Lake Chapter President
- Donald Benally, of Shiprock, New Mexico, Shiprock Chapter Vice-President
- Sharon Clahchischilliage, of Cudeii, New Mexico, Fmr. Navajo-Washington Office Director
- Rex Lee Jim, of Rock Point, Arizona Navajo Nation Council
- Arbin Mitchell, of Wide Ruins, Arizona, Executive Director of Navajo Nation Division of Community Development
- Daniel Peaches, of Kayenta, Arizona, Fmr. Kayenta Chapter Council Delegate, Kayenta Town Manager, Staff Assistant to Fmr. Chairman Peter MacDonald Sr.
- Jerry Todacheenie, of Shiprock, New Mexico, BHP Employee and member of Shiprock Fair Board
- D. Harrison Tsosie, of Dennehotso, Arizona, Navajo Nation Deputy Attorney General
- Dale Tsosie, of Lechee, Arizona, Navajo Citizen

=== Not Running ===
- Lawrence T. Morgan, of Pinedale, New Mexico, Navajo Nation council Speaker

=== Term limited ===
- Joe Shirley Jr., of Chinle, Arizona, incumbent President of the Navajo Nation

== Primary election polling ==
Poll Source	Dates Administered	Lynda Lovejoy	Ben Shelly
General Poll	January 10, 2010	51%	49%

Poll Source	Dates Administered	Rex Lee Jim	Lynda Lovejoy
General Poll	January 10, 2010	45%	44%

== Results ==
State Senator Lynda Lovejoy, who unsuccessfully sought the presidency in 2006, easily defeated eleven other candidates with 17,137 votes, becoming the first woman to win a Navajo Nation presidential primary. Navajo Nation Vice President Ben Shelly came in second place and qualified for the general election with 7,763 votes. Donald Benally of Shiprock placed third followed by the rest of the candidates.

Voter turnout was relatively low, at just 43.84% of registered voters. An estimated 48,511 of the 110,645 registered voters participated in the primary election.

Shelly claimed victory and promised voters in the Gorman Hall at the Window Rock Sports Center that "I will work with you. We will work together." Lovejoy demanded a recount.

Candidate	Running mate	Primary		General	
Candidate	Running mate	Votes	%	Votes	%
Lynda Lovejoy	Earl Tulley	17,399	36.16	30,520	47.50
Ben Shelly	Rex Lee Jim	7,715	16.03	33,734	52.50
Donald Benally	—	6,106	12.69		
Rex Lee Jim	—	4,199	8.73		
Sharon Clahchischilliage	—	3,171	6.59		
Arbin Mitchell	—	2,751	5.72		
D. Harrison Tsosie	—	2,735	5.68		
Dale E. Tsosie	—	2,337	4.86		
Daniel Peaches	—	749	1.56		
Jerry Jay Todacheene	—	448	0.93		
Anthony Begay	—	363	0.75		
Write-in		148	0.31		
Total		48,121	100.00	64,254	100.00
Valid votes		48,121	98.93	64,254	98.97
Invalid/blank votes		519	1.07	671	1.03
Total votes		48,640	100.00	64,925	100.00
Registered voters/turnout		110,645	43.96	111,985	57.98
