= Phefelia Nez =

Native American activist

First Lady of the Navajo Nation
- In office January 15, 2019 – January 10, 2023
- President: Jonathan Nez
- Preceded by: Martha Shelly (2015)
- Succeeded by: Jasmine Blackwater-Nygren

Personal details
- Citizenship: Navajo Nation; United States
- Spouse: Jonathan Nez
- Education: Northern Arizona University

Phefelia Nez is a Navajo leader and advocate who served as the first lady of the Navajo Nation. Her tenure was characterized by initiatives focused on the preservation of the Navajo language and culture, animal welfare reform, and her service on a New Mexico task force addressing Missing and Murdered Indigenous Women (MMIW).

Nez collaborated with the Biden administration on tribal sovereignty and the COVID-19 response, which led to her 2022 appointment to the board of trustees of the John F. Kennedy Center for the Performing Arts. Following her time in office, she has continued her work as a public speaker and co-owner of a consulting firm based in Flagstaff, Arizona.

== Early life and education ==
Nez was raised on Hopi Partition Land in Big Mountain, Arizona. She experienced a traditional upbringing, living in a hogan without electricity and participating in Navajo ceremonies with her parents, who were ranchers. Her father challenged her to "walk in two worlds," balancing her traditional upbringing with the modern Western world. Due to the lack of electricity in her childhood home, she developed an interest in various fields of learning by reading books.

Nez attended Northern Arizona University (NAU), where she earned undergraduate degrees in political science and criminal justice. In May 2022, she completed a Master of Public Administration degree program at NAU. She has also been awarded an honorary doctorate in humane letters from the university.

== Career ==
=== Second Lady of Navajo Nation ===
Nez served as the second lady of the Navajo Nation from 2015 to 2019 while her husband, Jonathan Nez, served as vice president under the Russell Begaye administration. During this period, the position of first lady was effectively vacant because president Begaye's wife, Kyoon Chung Begaye, resided in Georgia and did not participate in the administration's activities. Nez assumed the official duties typically assigned to the Office of the First Lady. Her work during this time focused on ceremonial duties and advocacy in areas such as literacy, healthy living, the arts, and anti-drunk driving initiatives.

=== First Lady of Navajo Nation ===
Nez's platform focused on education, outdoor recreation, philanthropy, faith-based initiatives, financial literacy, animal welfare, and the retention of the Navajo language and culture. She was also involved in advocacy regarding Missing and Murdered Indigenous Women (MMIW), working on the issue in both Arizona and New Mexico. She served as a member of a New Mexico task force dedicated to addressing the MMIW crisis.

In August 2020, Nez participated in a virtual discussion with U.S. first lady Jill Biden regarding tribal sovereignty. During this event, Nez criticized the federal government's initial response to the COVID-19 pandemic in the Navajo Nation, stating that assistance was "nonexistent" during the early stages of the crisis. In April 2021, she joined her husband in welcoming Jill Biden to Window Rock, Arizona during a two-day tour of the Navajo Nation.

In June 2022, Nez co-hosted a collaborative animal welfare summit to address issues such as animal control and veterinary care on the Navajo Nation. The event was hosted in partnership with the Navajo Nation Division of Natural Resources and Best Friends Animal Society.

In October 2022, U.S. president Joe Biden appointed Nez to the board of trustees of the John F. Kennedy Center for the Performing Arts. The appointment was intended to recognize her advocacy for tribal communities and leverage her experience in Navajo arts and education to benefit the board.

=== Business and later career ===
Nez is the majority owner of Nez Consulting, LLC, a business based in Flagstaff, Arizona, which she owns with her husband. In March 2025, she participated as a panelist at the "Matriarch Voices" event held at Coconino Community College alongside other Indigenous leaders such as Navajo Nation Council Speaker Crystalyne Curley.

== Personal life ==
Nez is married to Jonathan Nez, the former President of the Navajo Nation.

Honorary titles
Preceded by Martha Shelly	First Lady of the Navajo Nation; 2019–2023	Succeeded by Jasmine Blackwater-Nygren
Preceded by Unknown	Second Lady of the Navajo Nation; 2015–2019	Succeeded by Dottie Lizer
