= 2006 Navajo Nation presidential election =

- 8 August 2006 (Primary); 6 November 2006 (Run off)
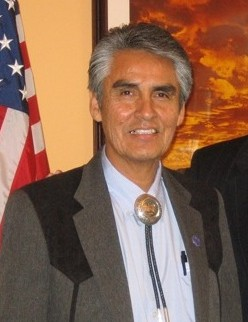

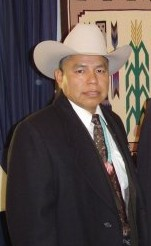

Nominee	Joe Shirley Jr.	Lynda Lovejoy	Frank Dayish
Running mate	Ben Shelly	Walter Phelps	N/A
Primary election	12,987; 27.77%	10,513; 22.48%	8,082; 17.28%
General election	34,945; 53.27%	30,653; 46.73%	Eliminated
Nominee	Ernest Harry Begay	Vern Roy Lee	James Henderson Jr.
Running mate	N/A	N/A	N/A
Primary election	7,820; 16.72%	2,749; 5.88%	2,565; 5.48%
General election	Eliminated	Eliminated	Eliminated
President before election
Joe Shirley Jr.
Frank Dayish
Elected President
Joe Shirley Jr.
Ben Shelly

The 2006 Navajo Nation presidential election took place on November 7, 2006. Primary elections took place on August 8, 2006. Incumbent President Joe Shirley Jr. was re-elected, defeating 11 candidates, including former New Mexico state representative Lynda Lovejoy.

== Candidates ==
=== Advanced to general election ===
- Joe Shirley Jr., incumbent President of the Navajo Nation (2003–present) from Chinle, Arizona
  - Frank Dayish Jr., incumbent Vice President of the Navajo Nation (2003–present)
- Lynda Lovejoy, former member of the New Mexico House of Representatives (1988–1998), who declared her candidancy on April 1, 2006, at the Crownpoint Chapter House in Crownpoint, New Mexico
  - Walter Phelps (from Leupp, Arizona)

=== Eliminated in primary ===
- Ernest Harry Begay, from Rock Point, Arizona
- Hoskie Bryant
- Frank Dayish Jr., incumbent Vice President of the Navajo Nation (2003–present), who declared his candidacy on May 6, 2006 at the Shiprock Chapter House
- James Henderson Jr., former member of the Arizona Senate (1985–1999), from Ganado, Arizona
- Vern Roy Lee, from Kirtland, New Mexico
- Wilbur Nelson Jr.
- Jon C. Reeves
- Harrison Todacheene, from Shiprock, New Mexico
- Calvin H. Tsosie Sr., from Yatahey, New Mexico

== Results ==
Shirley and Lovejoy proceeded to the runoff in November 2007. This was the first time in Navajo government history that a woman made it to the runoff. Immediately after the first round, Lovejoy selected Walter Phelps from Leupp, Arizona as her running mate to challenge Shirley, who picked Navajo Nation Council Delegate Ben Shelly (of Thoreau).

Shirley defeated Lovejoy in the second round by a margin of 4,000 votes. He became the first leader of the Navajo nation to be reelected since Chairman Peter MacDonald.

Candidate	Running mate	Primary		General	
Candidate	Running mate	Votes	%	Votes	%
Joe Shirley Jr.	Ben Shelly	12,987	27.77	34,945	53.27
Lynda Lovejoy	Walter Phelps	10,513	22.48	30,653	46.73
Frank Dayish Jr.	—	8,082	17.28		
Ernest Harry Begay	—	7,820	16.72		
Vern Roy Lee	—	2,749	5.88		
James Henderson Jr.	—	2,565	5.48		
Hoskie Bryant	—	745	1.59		
Calvin H. Tsosie Sr.	—	585	1.25		
Harrison Todacheene	—	282	0.60		
Wilbur Nelson Jr.	—	273	0.58		
Jon C. Reeves	—	165	0.35		
Total		46,766	100.00	65,598	100.00
Valid votes		46,766	99.60	65,598	99.53
Invalid/blank votes		189	0.40	308	0.47
Total votes		46,955	100.00	65,906	100.00
Registered voters/turnout		96,582	48.62	100,525	65.56
