= 2022 Navajo Nation presidential election =

- August 2, 2022 (Primary); November 8, 2022 (Run off)
- Turnout: 53.03%
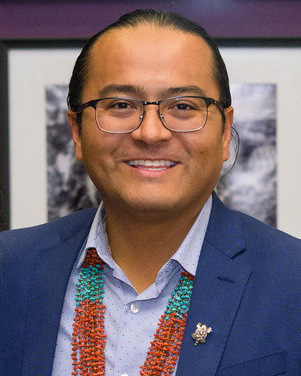

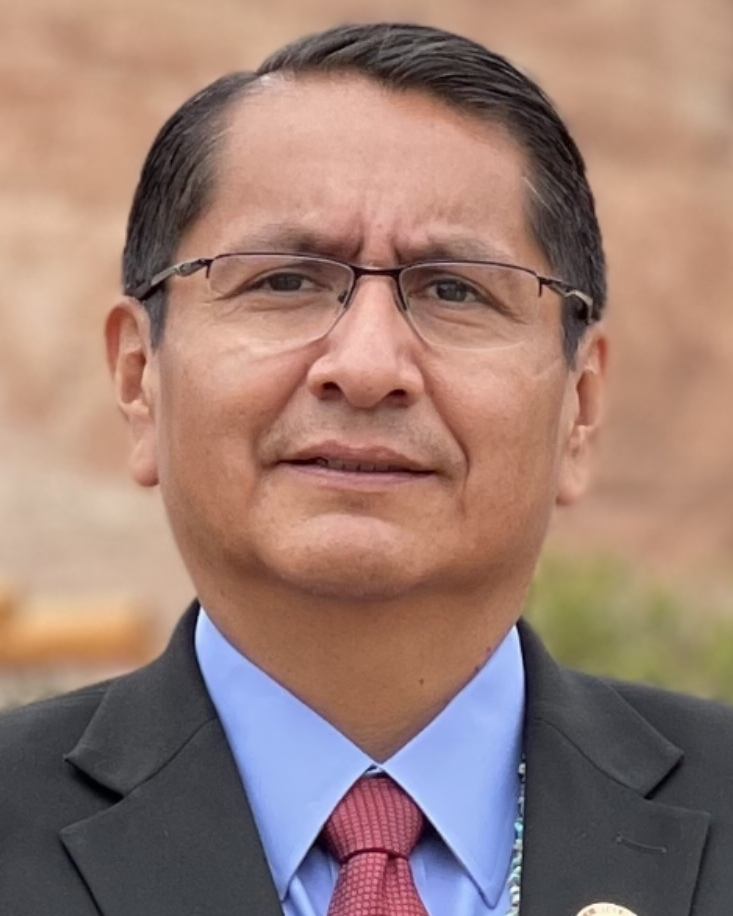

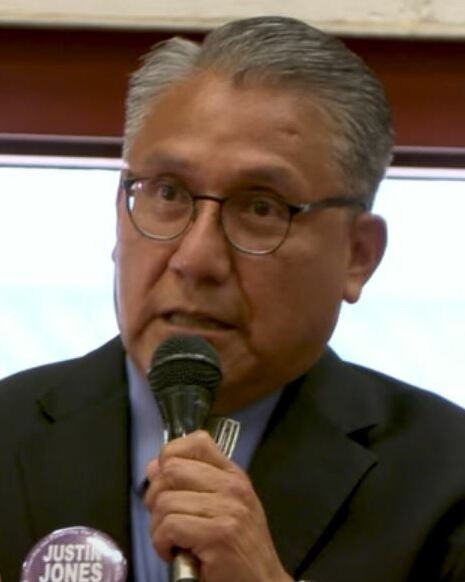

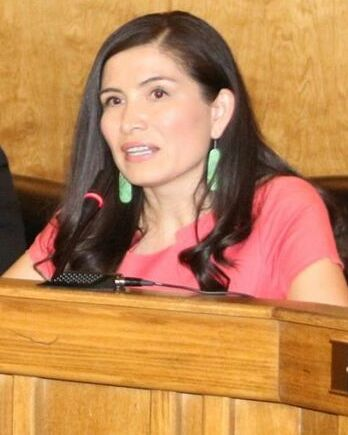
Candidate	Buu Nygren	Jonathan Nez
Running mate	Richelle Montoya	Chad Abeyta
Primary election	12,878; 27.12%	17,073; 35.95%
General election	34,890; 52.68%	31,339; 47.32%
Candidate	Justin Jones	Ethel Branch
Primary election	8,769; 18.46%	3,857; 8.12%
General election	Eliminated	Eliminated
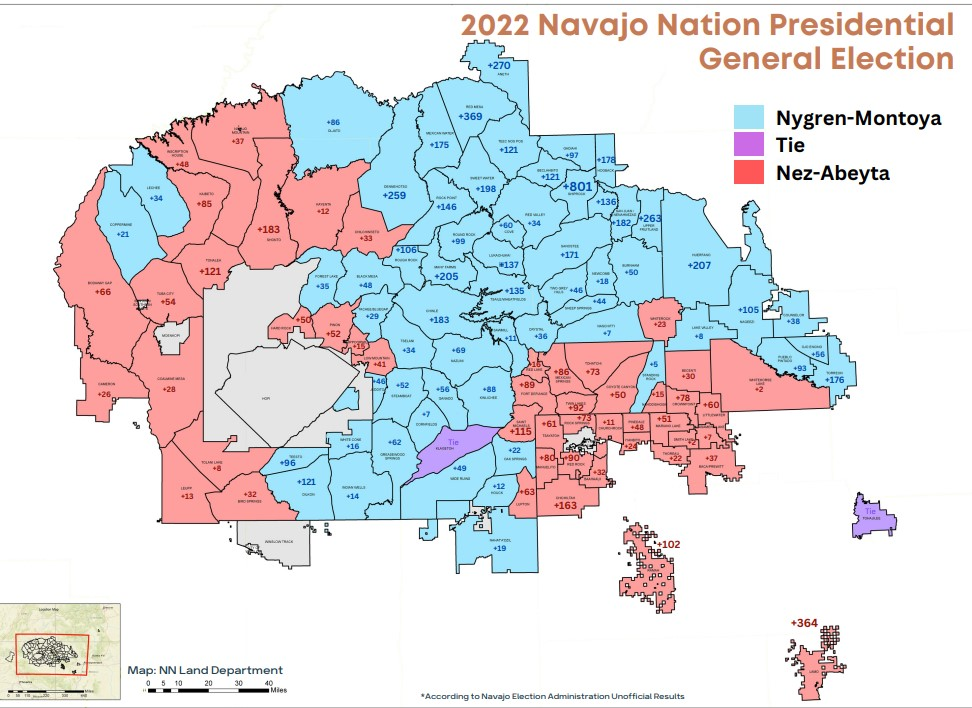
- Red denotes chapters won by Nez-Abeyta, Blue denotes chapters won by Nygren-Montoya. Purple denotes tie.
President and Vice President before election
Jonathan Nez
Myron Lizer
Elected President and Vice President
Buu Nygren
Richelle Montoya

The 2022 Navajo Nation presidential election took place on Tuesday, November 8, 2022, to elect the president and vice president of the Navajo Nation. The primary election was held on August 2. Incumbent president Jonathan Nez ran for reelection with attorney Chad Abeyta as his running mate. Incumbent Vice President Myron Lizer did not seek re-election, instead running for U.S. House in Arizona. Nez and Abeyta advanced to the general election, as did the challenging ticket of construction manager Buu Nygren and Torreon/Star Lake Chapter President Richelle Montoya. Nygren and Montoya won the general election by a 6-point margin, and Montoya became the Navajo Nation's first female vice president.

== Candidates ==
=== Advanced to general election ===
- Jonathan Nez, incumbent president (party affiliation: Democratic)
  - Chad Abeyta, attorney for the Navajo Nation Office of Legislative Counsel
- Buu Nygren, former Navajo Engineering and Construction Authority chief commercial officer, husband of Arizona state representative Jasmine Blackwater-Nygren, and candidate for vice president in 2018 (party affiliation: Democratic)
  - Richelle Montoya, president of the Torreon/Star Lake Chapter

=== Eliminated in primary ===
- Dineh Benally, former member of the San Juan Chapter Farm Board and candidate for president in 2018
- Greg Bigman, chair of the Diné College Board of Regents
- Ethel Branch, former attorney general of the Navajo Nation (2015–2019)
- Kevin Cody, tribal employee, environmental science student, and candidate for president in 2018
- Frankie Davis, activist and granddaughter of former Navajo Nation Councillor Mescalito Nelson
- Frank Dayish, former vice president of the Navajo Nation (2003–2007)
- Emily Ellison, family shelter director and candidate for president in 2018
- Sandra Jeff, former New Mexico state representative (2009–2015) (party affiliation: Libertarian)
- Justin Jones, attorney
- Rosanna Jumbo-Fitch, president of the Chinle Chapter
- Dolly Manson, educator
- Earl Sombrero, Ts'ah Bii' Kin Chapter manager
- Leslie Tsosie, scholar

== Results ==
Candidate	Running mate	Primary		General	
Candidate	Running mate	Votes	%	Votes	%
Jonathan Nez	Chad Abeyta	17,073	35.95	31,339	47.32
Buu Nygren	Richelle Montoya	12,878	27.12	34,890	52.68
Justin Jones	—	8,769	18.46		
Ethel Branch	—	3,857	8.12		
Greg Bigman	—	1,198	2.52		
Frank Dayish	—	957	2.02		
Dolly Manson	—	763	1.61		
Dineh Bennally	—	656	1.38		
Earl Sombrero	—	352	0.74		
Rosanna Jumbo-Fitch	—	298	0.63		
Sandra Jeff	—	218	0.46		
Frankie Davis	—	163	0.34		
Emily Ellison	—	150	0.32		
Leslie Tsosie	—	83	0.17		
Kevin Cody	—	78	0.16		
Total		47,493	100.00	66,229	100.00
