= Jonathan Nez =

President of the Navajo Nation from 2019 to 2023

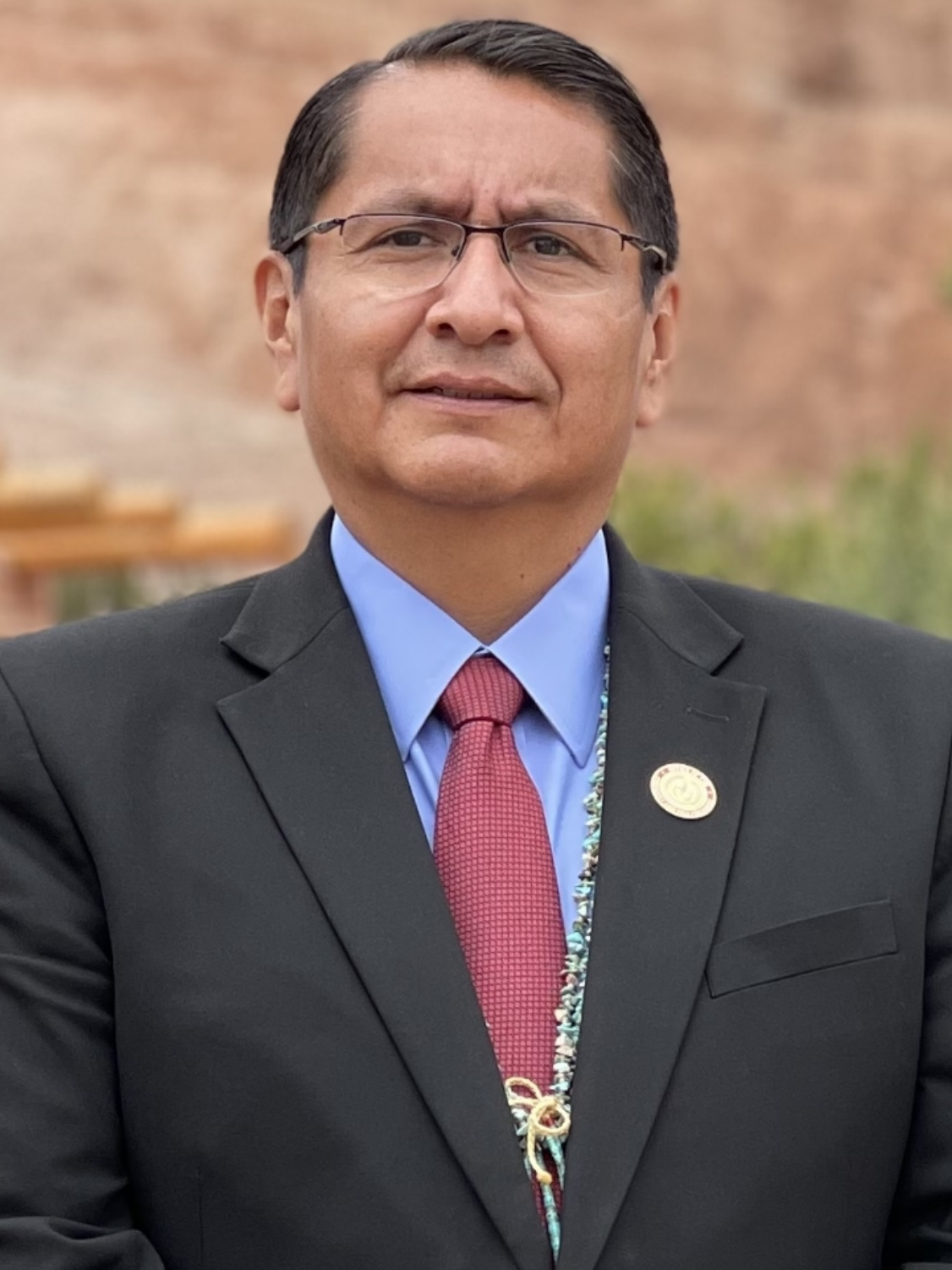
- Nez in 2021

9th President of the Navajo Nation
- In office January 15, 2019 – January 10, 2023
- Vice President: Myron Lizer
- Preceded by: Russell Begaye
- Succeeded by: Buu Nygren

9th Vice President of the Navajo Nation
- In office May 12, 2015 – January 15, 2019
- President: Russell Begaye
- Preceded by: Rex Lee Jim
- Succeeded by: Myron Lizer

Member of the Navajo County Board of Supervisors from the 1st district
- In office December 16, 2008 – May 11, 2015
- Preceded by: Percy Deal
- Succeeded by: Robert K. Black Jr.

Member of the Navajo Nation Council
- In office January 9, 2007 – May 12, 2015
- Preceded by: Harry Brown
- Succeeded by: Herman Daniels

Personal details
- Born: Jonathan Michael Nez; May 26, 1975 (age 51) Tuba City, Arizona, U.S.
- Citizenship: American; Navajo Nation
- Party: Democratic
- Spouse: Phefelia Nez
- Children: 2
- Education: Northland Pioneer College (AA); Northern Arizona University (BS, MPA)
- Website: Campaign website

Jonathan Michael Nez (born May 26, 1975) is a Navajo and American politician who served as the ninth president of the Navajo Nation from 2019 to 2023. He previously served as vice president and as a delegate to the Navajo Nation Council.

Nez represented the Tsah Bii' Kin, Navajo Mountain, Shonto, and Oljato chapters as a council delegate before being elected vice president in 2015 on a ticket with Russell Begaye. He served in that office until 2019, when he succeeded Begaye as president.

In 2024, he won the uncontested Democratic nomination to represent Arizona's 2nd congressional district, becoming the first Indigenous candidate in Arizona to win a major-party nomination for a congressional seat. He lost in the general election to incumbent Republican Eli Crane and is again the Democratic nominee challenging Crane in 2026.

== Early life and education ==
Nez was born on May 26, 1975 in Tuba City, Arizona, and raised in Shonto, Arizona, on the Navajo Nation. His parents were Mabel and John Nez. His mother was of the Áshįįhí (Salt People) clan and his father was of the Ta’neeszahnii (Tangle) clan.

Nez grew up working on the family ranch and graduated from Monument Valley High School in 1993. He later earned an Associate of Arts degree from Northland Pioneer College in 2001 and a Bachelor of Science in political science from Northern Arizona University (NAU) in 2002. He then earned a Master of Public Administration from NAU in 2005.

== Early political career ==
Nez served as vice president of the Navajo Nation's Shonto chapter. He later served as a delegate to the Navajo Nation Council, where he represented the Oljato, Ts'ah Bii' Kin, Navajo Mountain, and Shonto chapters. His grandfather had also represented Shonto on the council which led to Nez's interest in politics.

Nez was also elected to two terms as a member of the Navajo County Board of Supervisors, representing District 1.

In 2015, he was elected vice president of the Navajo Nation on a ticket led by Russell Begaye. He was formally sworn into office on May 12, 2015.

== President of the Navajo Nation (2019–2023) ==
Nez and Myron Lizer meeting with Congressman David Schweikert, 2019

On November 6, 2018, Nez was elected president of the Navajo Nation by a margin of 33.07% of the vote versus former President Joe Shirley Jr. Shirley had received the endorsement of Begaye and also boasted high name recognition owing to his former tenure. Nez became the youngest Navajo Nation president.

As president, he focused on water rights, economic development, and rural infrastructure. He worked to secure the Navajo-Gallup Water Supply Project and the Navajo-Utah Water Rights Settlement Agreement.

He also oversaw the Navajo Nation's response to the COVID-19 pandemic. By September 2021, the Navajo Nation's COVID-19 vaccination rate was higher than in most other parts of Arizona.

Nez unsuccessfully campaigned for reelection in 2022, losing to challenger Buu Nygren. During the campaign, he endorsed the legalization of same-sex marriage on the Navajo Nation.

== U.S. national politics ==
Nez was an early primary supporter of Hillary Clinton's 2016 presidential campaign and served on the Hillary for America Arizona Leadership Council.

He was selected as one of seventeen speakers to jointly deliver the keynote address at the 2020 Democratic National Convention. He was one of the electors for Arizona in 2020 for the presidential election.

== Congressional campaigns ==
Arizona's 2nd congressional district since 2023

On October 16, 2023, Nez announced his candidacy for Arizona's 2nd congressional district, which was held by Republican Eli Crane. The district is the largest in the state, stretching from south of Phoenix to the Utah border. Crane defeated Nez in the general election, 54% to 46%.

On July 22, 2025, Nez announced that he would run again for the 2nd congressional district in the 2026 election.

== Personal life ==
Nez is married to Phefelia Nez, who was appointed in 2022 to serve on the trustee board of the John F. Kennedy Center of Performing Arts. They have two sons.

Nez and his family were nearly struck when an SUV drove through a parade in Gallup, New Mexico, in August 2022. In total, fifteen people were left injured. Nez later reflected on the event saying "You would think it would never happen here. I'm sorry to say it happened here in Gallup, New Mexico", and "it was a difficult time for us".

Political offices
Preceded by Rex Lee Jim	Vice President of the Navajo Nation; 2015–2019	Succeeded by Myron Lizer
Preceded by Russell Begaye	President of the Navajo Nation; 2019–2023	Succeeded by Buu Nygren
