= Ben Shelly =

President of the Navajo Nation from 2011 to 2015

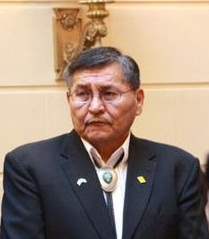
- Shelly in 2009

7th President of the Navajo Nation
- In office January 11, 2011 – May 12, 2015
- Vice President: Rex Lee Jim
- Preceded by: Joe Shirley Jr.
- Succeeded by: Russell Begaye

5th Vice President of the Navajo Nation
- In office January 9, 2007 – January 11, 2011
- President: Joe Shirley Jr.
- Preceded by: Frank Dayish
- Succeeded by: Rex Lee Jim

Member of the Navajo Nation Council
- In office January 15, 1991 – January 9, 2007
- Succeeded by: Edmund Yazzie

Personal details
- Born: July 6, 1947 Thoreau, New Mexico, U.S.
- Died: March 22, 2023 (aged 75) Gallup, New Mexico, U.S.
- Party: Democratic
- Spouse: Martha Shelly

Ben Shelly (July 6, 1947 – March 22, 2023) was the 7th president of the Navajo Nation. He was the first president to have been elected both president and vice president of the Navajo Nation, as well as the first New Mexican Navajo to hold the Navajo presidency.

On November 2, 2010, Shelly was voted in as the Navajo Nation's president-elect during the 2010 Navajo Nation presidential elections, defeating opponent New Mexico State Senator Lynda Lovejoy of the Navajo Nation. On August 16, 2014, Shelly lost in the Navajo Nation primaries to former Navajo Nation president Joe Shirley Jr and newcomer Christopher Deschene.

== Early life and education ==
Shelly was born in Thoreau, New Mexico, on July 6, 1947. He was Tó’aheedlíinii clan born for Tsʼah Yiskʼidnii. His maternal grandfather is Áshįįhí and his paternal grandfather is Táchiiʼnii.

Shelly's wife of 45 years, Martha Shelly, is originally from Coyote Canyon. She is Tábąąhá and born for Tódích’íiʼnii.he was in Chicago for 16 years They have five children and 10 grandchildren.

Shelly lived in Chicago for 16 years, training in heavy equipment maintenance and working as a supervisor for a heavy equipment company. He moved back to the Navajo Nation in 1976, and owned a fleet maintenance and mechanic shop.

== Politics ==
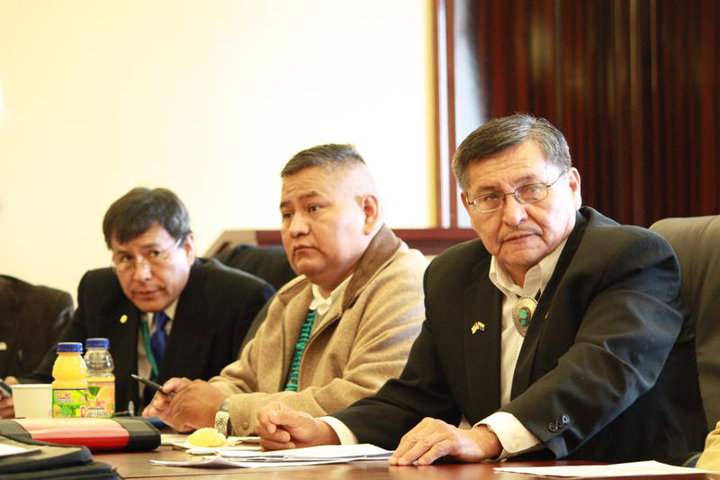
Navajo Delegation including Councilmen Kenneth Maryboy & Davis Filfred along w/Vice-president Shelly meeting w/Utah State Legislature in Salt Lake City, Utah

In 1990, Shelly was chairman of the Dineh Rights Association.

=== Navajo Nation Council delegate ===
Shelly became the Thoreau Navajo Nation councilman in 1991, and in 1993 he campaigned for legalized gambling in Navajo areas.

He became a member of the Transportation and Intergovernmental Relations Committees, and chairman of the Budget and Finance Committee as well as serving 12 years as a McKinley County Commissioner.

He was in the leadership of the National Associations of Counties Organization, where he helped form a Native American coalition of county officials from Apache, Coconino, San Juan of Utah, San Juan of New Mexico, Navajo, Sandoval, and McKinley counties.

== Navajo Nation vice-president ==
In 2006, Navajo Nation president Joe Shirley, Jr. selected Shelly as his running mate in the 2006 presidential election. At the time of his selection, President Shirley said of Shelly, "He has the necessary knowledge of our government, and the government outside, He is down to earth and knows the heart of the people. He was raised with culture, as I was, on a sheepskin rug." Shirley and Shelly won the 2006 Navajo Nation presidential election. Shelly was sworn in as vice president of the Navajo Nation on 9 January 2007.

Shelly served on the U.S. Centers for Medicare and Medicaid Services Tribal Technical Advisory Group, leading efforts to amend existing Medicaid laws to ensure that a Certificate of Indian Blood could be used to verify U.S. citizenship. Shelly represented the Navajo Nation in budget discussions and formulations for federally-funded programs. In 2007, he led a Navajo delegation in consultative budget deliberations with the U.S. Office of Management and Budget.

Although Navajo Nation elections are officially non-partisan, Shelly was a registered Democrat active in state politics in New Mexico, Arizona, and Utah. He worked with the New Mexico state legislature and the governor's office to fund capital improvement projects on the Navajo Nation. New Mexico governor Bill Richardson appointed Shelly to his Tribal Economic Development Task Force.

Shelly was also an opponent of Senate Bill 1690 which would allow San Juan County, Utah Navajos to be their own trustee, managing their own resources by way of a nonprofit organization structure, without interference from the Navajo Nation. The tribe has long argued it should be the trustee, sans any federal or state interference.

=== Probe of Tribal Council discretionary funds ===
In October 2010, Ben Shelly, among other Navajo tribal officials, were charged in an investigation of slush funds just weeks before the November election. Shelly pleaded not guilty to those tribal charges of fraud, conspiracy and theft. Each misdemeanor count carried a penalty of up to a year in jail and $5,000 if convicted.

Shelly had stated that he was confident that the conspiracy, fraud, and theft charges against him would be dismissed, and that he is not a crook. Criminal complaints allege that Shelly unlawfully took $8,850 in tribal discretionary funds to benefit himself and his family while he served on the Tribal Council. He pleaded not guilty and said the money was for "Legitimate Hardships."

Court documents allege that Shelly conspired to benefit himself and his immediate family, including his wife, grandchildren and a sister, in 2005 and 2006. On four occasions, Shelly filed applications for discretionary funds on behalf of his family and personally approved the requests, a complaint alleged. Tribal ethics and rules laws have limits on the value of gifts lawmakers can receive and prohibit engaging in conflicts of interest.

Police served some delegates with the complaints just before they convened for the fourth day of their fall session in the tribal capital of Window Rock.

The Tribal Council called for a special prosecutor in 2009 to look into the Navajo tribal president Joe Shirley Jr.'s relationship with two companies that had operated on the reservation. The Navajo attorney general accepted that request but also expanded the probe to include the council's use of discretionary funds, to the surprise of the council.

The council, and the Office of the President and Vice President receive millions of dollars a year through supplemental budget appropriations to dole out to elderly Navajos on fixed income, college students, organizations in need or Navajos looking for emergency funding.

Alan Balaran was hired as the special prosecutor in 2010. His duties later were expanded to include a tribal ranch program, and discretionary funds given to the tribal president's and vice president's office.

"If Shelly is found guilty, however, he will be removed from office and the people will need to launch a new election process," NM State Rep. Ray Begaye, D-Shiprock said. "If removed, Shelly likely will be joined by many of the delegates. Of the 24 elected tuesday to the reduced council, 16 were incumbents."

== Navajo Nation president (2011–2015) ==
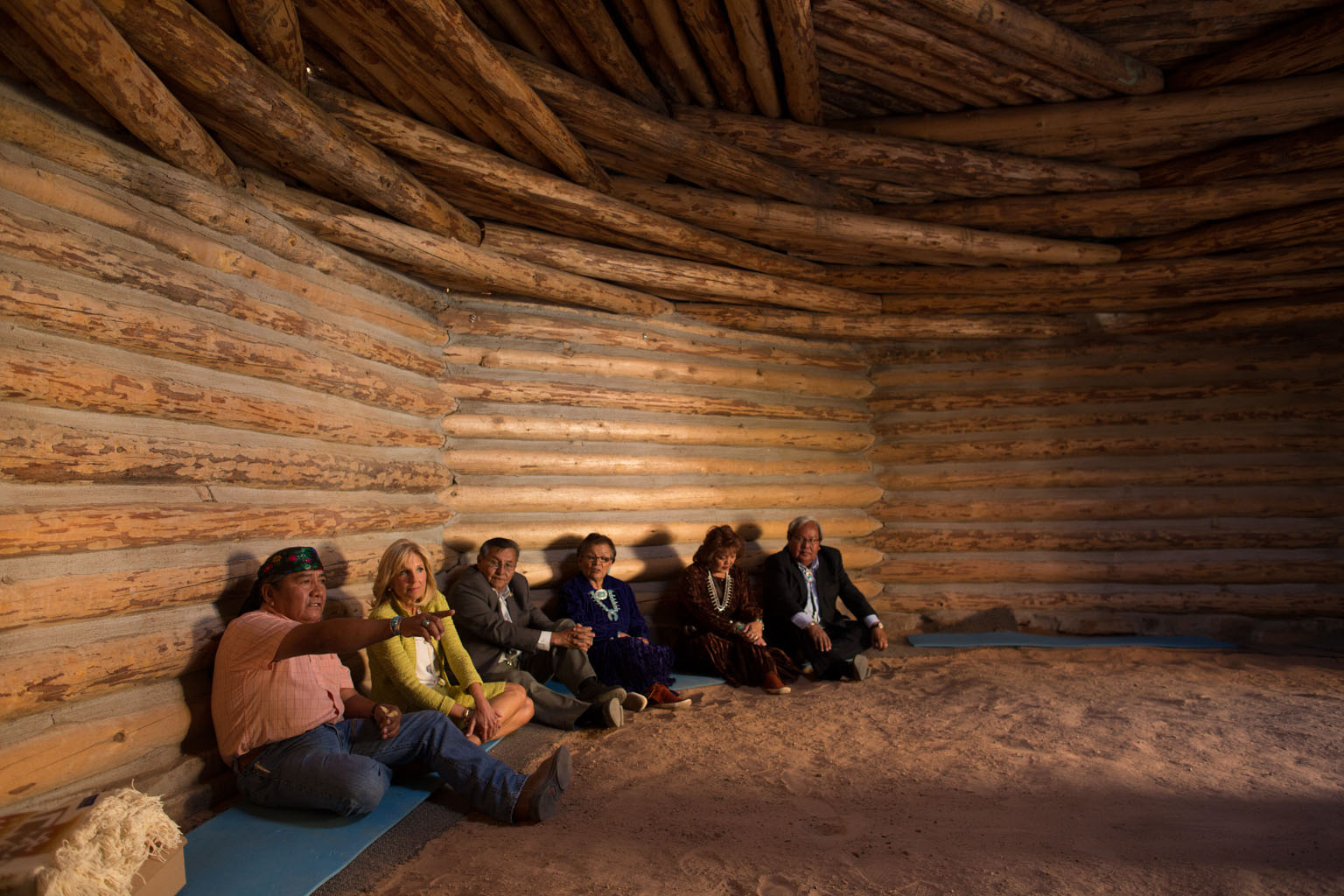
From a traditional hogan in Window Rock, Arizona, Jill Biden listens to Medicine Man Robert Johnson along with Navajo Nation president Ben Shelly, First Lady Martha Shelly, Speaker of the Navajo Nation Council Johnny Naize and Barbara Naize. May 17, 2013.

In the Navajo Nation Tribal presidential election, held on November 2, 2010, Shelly defeated New Mexico Sen. Lynda Lovejoy, becoming the first vice president to be elected to the Navajo Nation presidency, dashing Lovejoy's hopes of becoming the tribe's first female president. Shelly was sworn in as president on January 11, 2011.

Despite Vice President Shelly facing criminal charges in the probe of the council's controversial use of discretionary funds, he would go on to win the 2010 election. Later, Shelly would be cleared of any wrongdoing. Shelly would serve as president during the 88-member Tribal Council reduction following the special election of December 2009 that was aimed at reforming the Navajo government.

Shelly received 52 percent of the vote in the 2010 presidential race. His opponent, New Mexico state senator Lynda Lovejoy, garnered 47 percent of the vote - 33,692 votes to Lovejoy's 30,357. Voter turnout hit nearly 58 percent in the 2010 tribal elections.

In his last days as Navajo president, he would veto various controversial bills affecting the still as-yet-decided 2014 Navajo presidential Race.

Shelly's presidential term was extended five months after the uncertainty of The Navajo Nation presidential election affected his term in office, The Shelly-Jim administration term officially ended on May 12, 2015, during which a flag retiring ceremony for the Navajo and U.S. flags that flew for the Shelly-Jim administration were retired and new ones flown.

=== 2015 Navajo Nation presidential election ===
During the Navajo Nation primary election on August 26, 2014, President Ben Shelly lost his bid for a second term with only 2,446 votes from 110 chapters. Former Arizona representative Chris Deschene and former two-term Navajo Nation president Joe Shirley Jr. were to move on to the general election, but the Navajo Supreme Court suspended the 2014 general election, and the council subsequently delayed the election further. Ben Shelly's term ended January 13, 2015. As determined by the Navajo Nation Code §1006, the speaker of the Navajo Council shall assume the duties of the office in the event a vacancy of both the president and vice president.

== Navajo Nation president interim appointee (2015) ==
In a controversial appointment, Ben Shelly was designated interim president; contradicting Navajo Nation Code § 1006 in resolutions referenced as CD-80-14 and CD-81-14. on May 12, 2015, Ben Shelly and Rex Lee Jim finished their one term which was unprecedentedly extended another five months, after problems with the disqualification of presidential hopeful Chris Deschenee and the ongoing special election between Joe Shirley Jr. and Russell Begaye. On that day the Shelly-Jim Administration passed the Navajo Nation executive office to newly-elected Navajo president-elect Russell Begaye and vice president-elect Johnathon Nez.

== Death ==
Shelly died on March 22, 2023, at a hospital in Gallup, New Mexico at the age of 75. His spokesman stated he died from a “long illness”. Navajo nation president Buu Nygren ordered the flags on the Navajo reservation to be lowered.

Political offices
Preceded by Joe Shirley Jr.	President of the Navajo Nation; 2011–2015	Succeeded by Russell Begaye
