= Buu Nygren =

President of the Navajo Nation since 2023

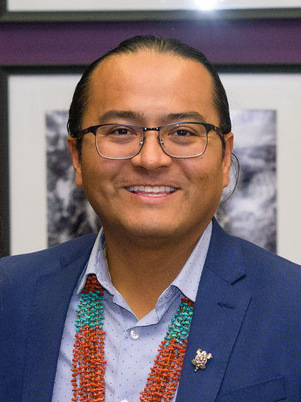
- Nygren in 2023

10th President of the Navajo Nation
- Incumbent
- Assumed office January 10, 2023
- Vice President: Richelle Montoya
- Preceded by: Jonathan Nez
- Succeeded by: Crystalyne Curley (elect)

Personal details
- Born: December 25, 1986 (age 39) Blanding, Utah, U.S.
- Citizenship: American; Navajo Nation
- Party: Democratic
- Spouse: Jasmine Blackwater
- Education: Arizona State University (BS, MBA); University of Southern California (EdD)
- Website: Office website Campaign website

Buu Van Nygren (born December 25, 1986) is a Navajo American politician currently serving as the 10th president of the Navajo Nation.

== Early life ==
Nygren was born on December 25, 1986, in Blanding, Utah. His mother is Navajo and his father is of Vietnamese descent. His mother gave birth to him at 15 and he never knew his father. When giving him a last name his mother misspelled the Vietnamese last name Nguyen as Nygren.

Nygren is Táchiiʼnii (Red Running into Water clan). As his father is not Navajo, he has no paternal clan and is therefore said to be born for Vietnamese when his clans are named. He attended Red Mesa High School.

Nygren was the running mate of Joe Shirley Jr. in the 2018 Navajo Nation presidential election, losing to Jonathan Nez and Myron Lizer. In the 2022 election, Nygren and running mate Richelle Montoya received 34,890 votes, defeating the Nez-Abeyta campaign who received 31,339 votes. He was sworn in on January 10, 2023. At 35 years of age, Nygren became the youngest person to have been elected President of the Navajo Nation.

== President of the Navajo Nation (2023–present) ==
Nygren received international media attention when he protested human remains being sent to the Moon as part of Peregrine Mission One. Nygren claimed that the moon is the "heritage" of the Navajo and other Indian nations and that sending human remains would desecrate Indian spiritual property. Nygren also stated that NASA had coordinated with the Navajo on the 1998 Lunar Prospector mission, however, NASA has no jurisdiction over Peregrine as it is both launched and operated by private companies.

In August 2024, a petition was launched to recall Nygren from office. The recall organizers accused Nygren of reneging and inaction on his campaign promises, misusing tribal funds, and creating a culture of workplace harassment.

Despite having previously endorsed and campaigned for Kamala Harris, Nygren was among the first elected Democrats to congratulate Donald Trump following the 2024 election.

On April 16, 2024, Nygren was accused by Navajo Nation Vice President Richelle Montoya, his 2022 running mate, of sexually harassing her during a meeting in August 2023. Nygren denied the allegations and accused the Navajo Times of discrediting his administration. The accusations against Nygren were investigated by the tribe's attorney general during an eight-month period in 2024; the investigation found the claims of sexual harassment to be "not warranted."

Nygren announced his reelection bid for a second term on April 6, 2026. In the primary election on July 21, Nygren placed third with 7,410 votes (15.30%), failing to advance to the general election.

== Personal life ==
Nygren has worked in construction management. He is married to former Arizona state representative Jasmine Blackwater-Nygren.

Political offices
| Preceded by Jonathan Nez | President of the Navajo Nation; 2023–present | Incumbent |
