= Northland Pioneer College =

Community college in northeastern Arizona, U.S.

- Other name: NPC
- Motto: Expanding Minds, Transforming Lives
- Type: Public community college
- Established: 1974 (52 years ago)
- President: Chato Hazelbaker
- Faculty: 178
- Administrative staff: 136
- Students: 6,712
- Location: Holbrook, Arizona, United States; 34.2431651°N 110.0542716°W
- Campus: Rural
- Colors: Royal blue, Gold
- Nickname: Golden Eagles
- Mascot: Ernie Eagle
- Website: www.npc.edu

Northland Pioneer College (NPC) is a public community college serving the communities of northeastern Arizona. Campuses are located in four of the largest Navajo County communities: Holbrook, Show Low, Snowflake, and Winslow. Five centers are located in Hopi/Polacca, Kayenta, Springerville, St. Johns, and Whiteriver. NPC also partners with community members in Apache County, Arizona.

NPC is governed by the Navajo County Community College District, the nation's second-largest community college service area – 21,158 square miles (54,800 km^{2}). The Navajo, Hopi, and White Mountain Apache Indian Reservations occupy more than forty percent of the total land in the college's service area. NPC has an open admissions policy.

== History ==
In the late 1950s, citizens in Northeastern Arizona were concerned about the lack of access to higher education and began advocating for the establishment of a regional community college. In fall 1972, the Navajo County Community College District was formed to serve the higher education needs of residents in a region covering 21,158 square miles (nearly the size of West Virginia). The district oversees Northland Pioneer College, which began offering college classes in fall 1974. More than 2,000 students enrolled that first year, double the anticipated number. Classes were held in an abandoned school, an abandoned hospital and a variety of public school classrooms and community buildings. The first graduating class, in spring 1975, included nine students.

=== Presidents ===
- Edward Sorensen, May 1973 - January 1977
- Gordon Snowbarger, January 1977 - June 1977 (interim)
- Marvin Vasher, July 1977 - October 1990
- Shirley Reed, October - December 1990 (interim)
- John Anderson, January 1991 - January 1997
- Gary Passer, January 1997 - June 2004
- Richard Fleming, July 2004 - September 20, 2005
- Gary Passer, September 21, 2005 - June 2006 (interim)
- Ralph Orr, July 2006 - April 2007
- Mark Vest, April - May 2007 (interim)
- Jeanne Swarthout, May 2007 - June 2018
- Mark Vest, July 2018 – October 2020
- Jeanne Swarthout, November 2020 - June 2021 (interim)
- Chato Hazelbaker, July 2021 – June 2024
- Von Lawson, January 2025 – Present

== Accreditation ==
NPC is accredited by the Higher Learning Commission. The college also is accredited by agencies on a program-specific basis.

== Notable alumni ==
- Iva Casuse Honwynum, Navajo artist
- Jonathan Nez, 9th President of the Navajo Nation
- Mario Wuysang, professional basketball player
