= 2018 Navajo Nation presidential election =

- August 28, 2018 (Primary); November 6, 2018 (Run off)
- Turnout: 66.53%
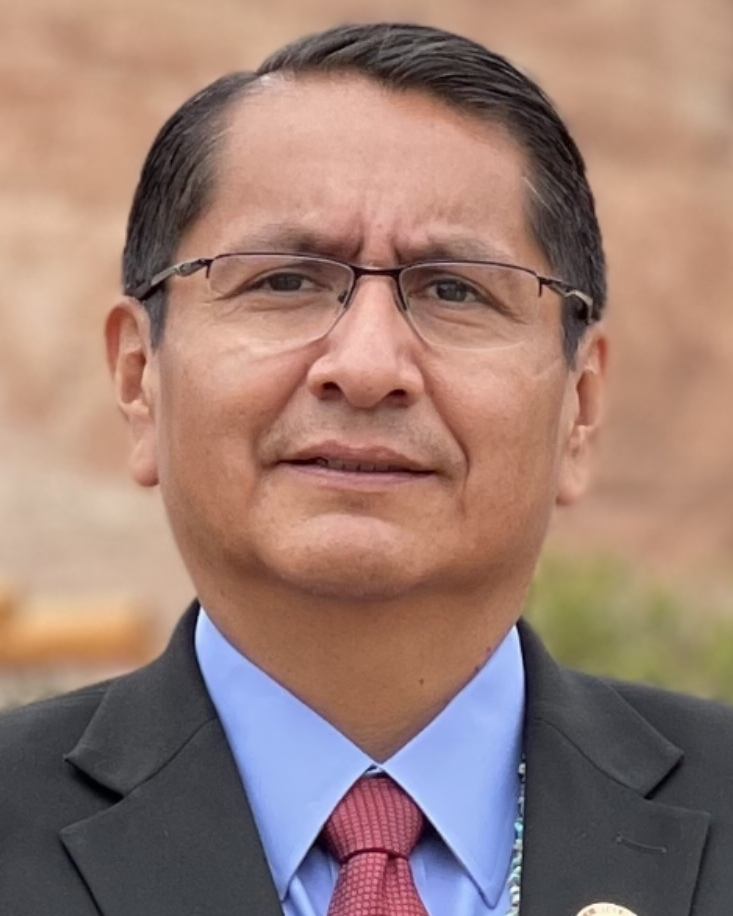

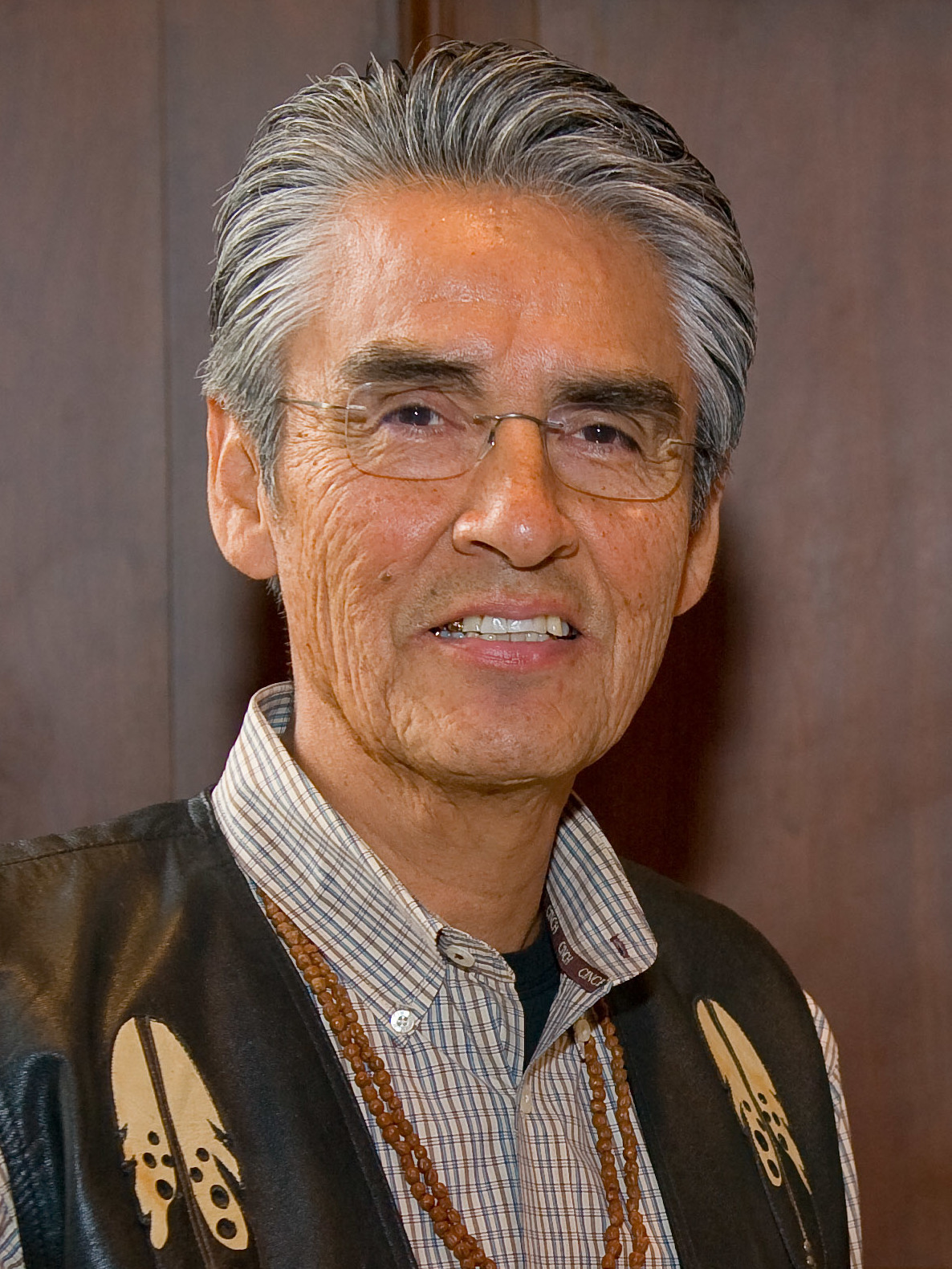

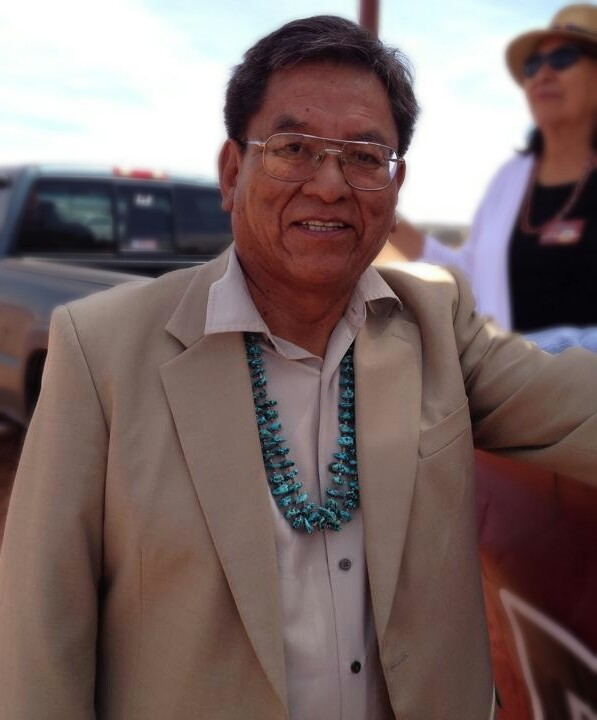

Candidate	Jonathan Nez	Joe Shirley, Jr	Tom Chee
Running mate	Myron Lizer	Buu Nygren	N/A
Primary election	14,397; 28.85%	6,871; 13.77%	6,426; 12.88%
General election	41,261; 66.54%	20,751; 33.46%	Eliminated
Candidate	Dineh Benally	Russell Begaye	Tom Tso
Running mate	N/A	N/A	N/A
Primary election	5,262; 10.55%	3,939; 7.89%	3,442; 6.90%
General election	Eliminated	Eliminated	Eliminated
President before election
Russell Begaye
Jonathan Nez
Elected President
Jonathan Nez
Myron Lizer

The Navajo Nation presidential election of 2018 was held on Tuesday, November 6, 2018. The candidates for President of the Navajo Nation in the general election were Jonathan Nez and Joe Shirley, Jr. Jonathan Nez and running mate Myron Lizer won the election. Although neither Nez nor Shirley were incumbents, they possessed the high name recognition associated with incumbents.

The primary election was held on Tuesday, August 28, 2018 between 18 candidates for the office of Navajo Nation President.

== Candidates ==
=== Advanced to general election ===
- Joe Shirley, Jr. former Navajo Nation President (2003-2011), vying for a third term.
  - Buu Nygren, USC student.
- Jonathan Nez, is the incumbent Vice-President of the Navajo Nation under Russell Begaye.
  - Myron Lizer, an entrepreneur at Fort Defiance, AZ/Coalmine, NM.

=== Eliminated in primary ===
- Benny Bahe
- Russell Begaye, incumbent president of the Navajo Nation.
- Tom Chee, incumbent council delegate of the Shiprock Chapter.
- Calvin Lee, Jr.
- Vincent H. Yazzie
- Rex Lee Jim, former vice-president of the Navajo Nation (2011-2015)
- Norman Patrick Brown
- Trudie Jackson
- Shawn Redd
- Alton Joe Shepherd
- Emily Ellison
- Tom Tso
- Kevin Cody
- Hope MacDonald Lonetree
- Nick X. Taylor
- Dineh Benally

== Results ==
A referendum for a salary increase for President and Vice-President did not pass with 39,026 votes against and 19,439 votes for.

Candidate	Running mate	Primary		General	
Candidate	Running mate	Votes	%	Votes	%
Jonathan Nez	Myron Lizer	14,397	28.85	41,261	66.54
Joe Shirley, Jr.	Buu Nygren	6,871	13.77	20,751	33.46
Tom Chee	—	6,426	12.88		
Dineh Benally	—	5,262	10.55		
Russell Begaye	—	3,939	7.89		
Tom Tso	—	3,442	6.90		
Hope MacDonald Lonetree	—	2,387	4.78		
Alton Joe Shepherd	—	1,784	3.58		
Emily Ellison	—	1,259	2.52		
Calvin Lee, Jr.	—	1,217	2.44		
Rex Lee Jim	—	964	1.93		
Shawn Redd	—	502	1.01		
Norman Patrick Brown	—	405	0.81		
Nick X. Taylor	—	371	0.74		
Trudie Jackson	—	230	0.46		
Benny Bahe	—	160	0.32		
Vincent H. Yazzie	—	155	0.31		
Kevin Cody	—	126	0.25		
Total		49,897	100.00	62,012	100.00
Valid votes		49,897	98.60	62,012	98.21
Invalid/blank votes		711	1.40	1,132	1.79
Total votes		50,608	100.00	63,144	100.00
Registered voters/turnout		88,007	57.50	94,916	66.53
