= 2014–15 Navajo Nation presidential election =

- August 26, 2014 (Primary); April 21, 2015 (Run off)
- Turnout: 37.21%
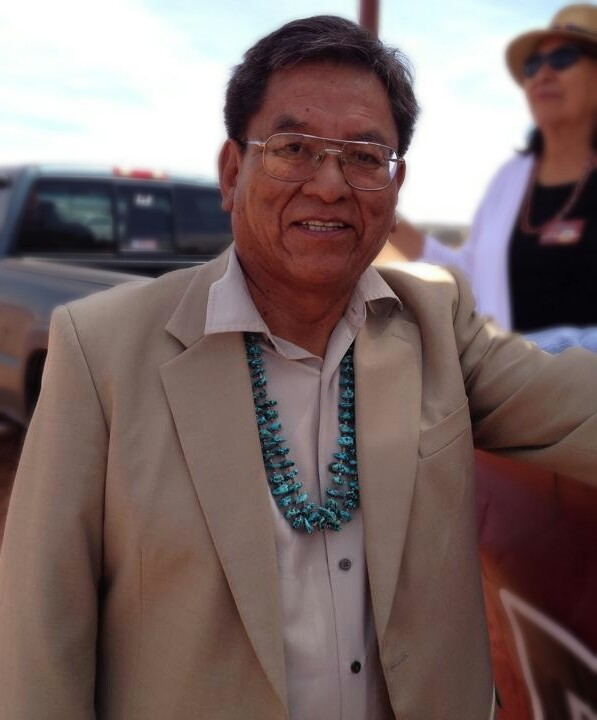

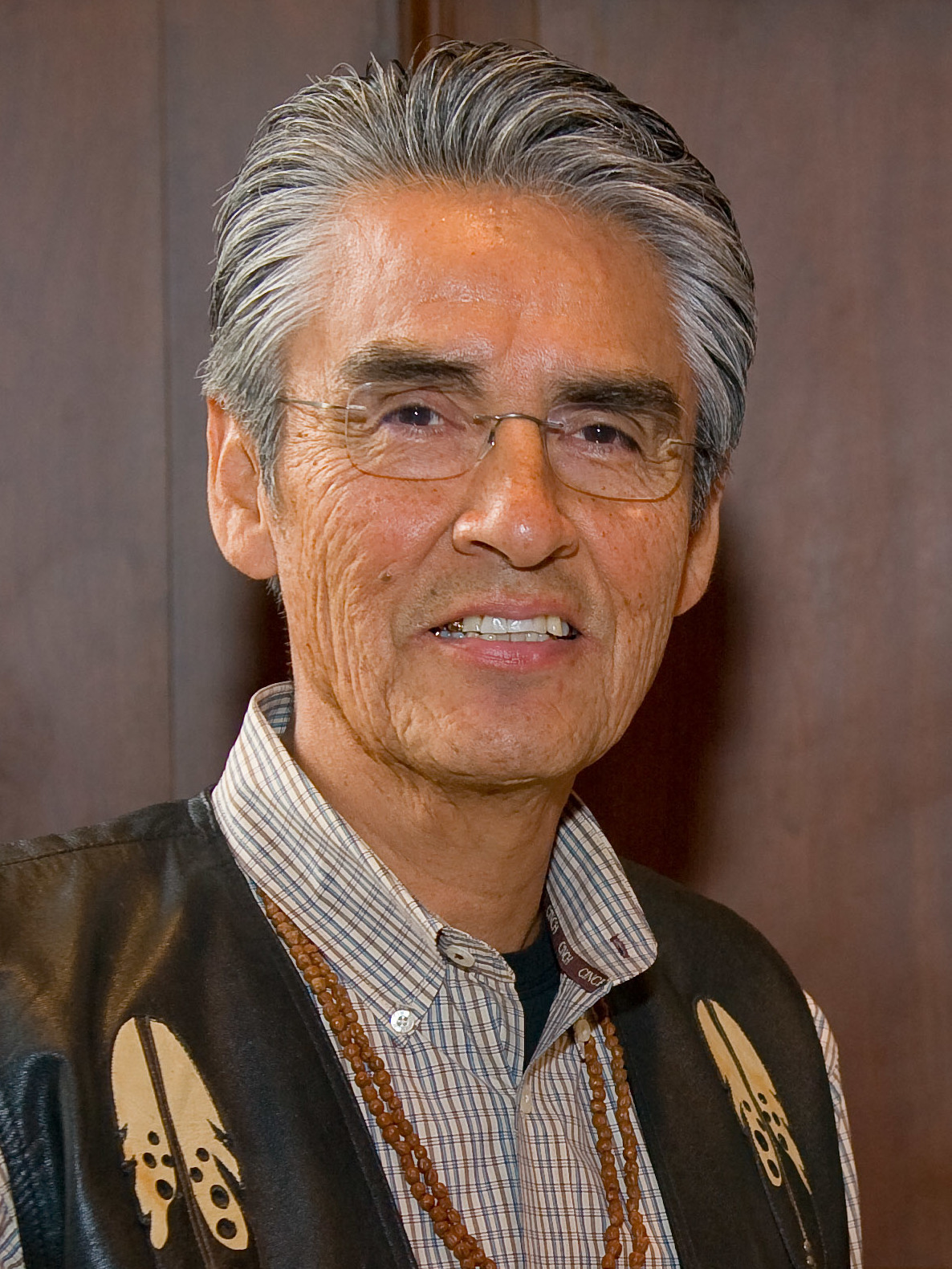

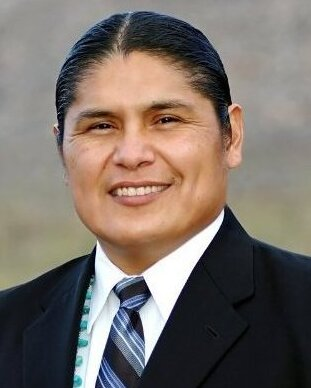

Candidate	Russell Begaye	Joe Shirley Jr.	Chris Deschene
Running mate	Jonathan Nez	Dineh Benally	Fannie L. Atcitty
Primary election	7,453; 14.41%	11,052; 21.36%	9,831; 19.00%
General election	25,902; 62.95%	15,245; 37.05%	Disqualified
Candidate	Donald Benally	Kenneth Maryboy
Running mate	N/A	N/A
Primary election	5,332; 10.31%	3,172; 6.13%
General election	Eliminated	Eliminated
President before election
Ben Shelly
Rex Lee Jim
Elected President
Russell Begaye
Jonathan Nez

The 2015 Navajo Nation Presidential Election was held on April 21, 2015, with the primary on August 26, 2014. Russell Begaye and Jonathan Nez, who finished third in the primary, won the election.

In the primary election, Joe Shirley Jr. and Chris Deschene initially advanced to the general election. Originally the general election between Shirley and Deschene was to be held on November 4, 2014. However, two former presidential candidates, Dale E. Tsosie and Hank Whitethorne, who were eliminated in the primary election, challenged Deschene's candidacy over his fluency of the Navajo Language, a requirement to run for president. This resulted in the disqualification of Chris Deschene and his running mate Fannie L. Atcitty.

Due to the disqualification, the election was delayed to April 21, 2015, between Shirley and Dineh Benally against Begaye and Nez.

== History ==
On August 25, 2014, the Navajo Nation held primary elections for the Office of President. Joe Shirley Jr. and Chris Deschene had the two highest vote counts. In the weeks following, two other primary candidates sued in tribal court, invoking a never-used 1990s law that required candidates to be fluent in the Navajo language. They asked for an assessment of the leading candidates' language skills.

On October 23, 2014, the Office of Hearings and Appeals of the tribe held the first hearing on the complaint filed against Deschene. The meeting was presided by chief hearing officer Richie Nez. The court body ruled in favor of Dale Tsosie and Hank Whitethorne, the former primary candidates, and issued a default ruling against Deschene, who had refused to participate in assessment.

Later that day, the Navajo Supreme Court, in a special session on the matter, enforced the ruling from the lower Court body and ordered that the Navajo government remove Deschene from the presidential ballot because of his lack of Navajo language skills.

The High Court ruled that the presidential election scheduled for November 4 (12 days later) would be postponed, and ordered that it be held by the end of January 2015. Chief Justice Herb Yazzie and Associate Justice Eleanor Shirley ruled for the 2–1 majority; Justice Irene Black wrote in her dissent that the technicality must be sent back to the lower court for correction there. The decision did not outline who would act as executive at the end of the current president's term (January 2015).

In the early hours of October 24, 2014 the Navajo Council passed legislative Bill 0298-14 amending the Navajo Nation Code. The legislation repealed the language requirement of the qualifications sections for president. This enabled Chris Deschene's participation in the election.

The following Monday, the Navajo Board of Election Supervisors (NBES) met but took no action to implement the court directives. Counsel for NBES motioned the High Court for further instruction. The next day, the Navajo Nation Election Board commissioner, Wallace Charley (joined later by Kimmeth Yazzie, Navajo Election Administration) announced that Deschene's name would remain on the ballot. Though he had vowed to continue, Deschene resigned from the race on October 30.

On October 29, Navajo President Ben Shelly vetoed the bill repealing the language requirement. The Navajo general election was held. Joe Shirley Jr. had the majority of votes by the unofficial tally.

The Navajo Council scheduled a primary and general election for June and August 2015. On Monday, January 5, 2015, President Shelly vetoed the language fluency bill. On January 7, five assistant attorneys-general filed petition with the Navajo Nation Supreme Court for clarification on the question of the presidential vacancy issue. Through a controversial agreement and resolution, the Court and the Council appointed Ben Shelly to act as interim President.

In the special election, businessman Russell Begaye was elected as president and Jonathan Nez as vice-president. In May 2015, they were sworn in. Begaye supports encouraging native language use among the Navajo, who have the most members of nearly any tribe who speak their native language. Approximately half of the Nation's 340,000 members speak Navajo. Begaye came to office supporting the Grand Canyon Escalade, a proposed project to increase tourism at the canyon, as well as initiatives to develop a rail port to export crops and coal from the reservation and to pursue clean coal technology.

== Candidates ==
=== Advanced to general election ===
- Joe Shirley Jr. former Navajo Nation President (2003–2011), vying for a third term.
  - Dineh Benally.
- Chris Deschene, Marine Veteran & former AZ State House of Representatives.**
  - Fannie L. Atcitty, Navajo lifelong educator and community organizer.**
- Russell Begaye, incumbent Council Delegate of the Shiprock Chapter, advanced through disqualification of Deschene-Atcitty campaign.
  - Jonathan Nez, incumbent Council Delegate of the Ts'ah Bii Kin, Navajo Mountain, Shonto, & Oljato Chapters.

**Disqualified on October 9, 2014.

=== Eliminated in primary ===
- Russell Begaye, incumbent Council Delegate of the Navajo Nation (Shiprock).
- Donald Benally
- Kenneth Maryboy
- Edison Wauneka
- Ben Shelly, incumbent President of the Navajo Nation.
- Myron McLaughlin
- Carrie Lynn Martin
- Dale E. Tsosie
- Duane H. Yazzie
- Moroni Benally
- Cal Nez
- Edison "Chip" Begay
- Hank Whitethorne
- Kee Yazzie Mann
- Dan Smith

== Results ==
Candidate	Running mate	Primary		General	
Candidate	Running mate	Votes	%	Votes	%
Joe Shirley Jr.	Dineh Benally	11,052	21.36	15,245	37.05
Chris Deschene	Fannie L. Atcitty	9,831	19.00		
Russell Begaye	Jonathan Nez	7,453	14.41	25,902	62.95
Donald Benally	—	5,332	10.31		
Kenneth Maryboy	—	3,172	6.13		
Edison J. Wauneka	—	2,468	4.77		
Ben Shelly	—	2,463	4.76		
Myron McLaughlin	—	2,373	4.59		
Carrie Lynn Martin	—	2,143	4.14		
Dale E. Tsosie	—	1,292	2.50		
Duane H. Yazzie	—	1,120	2.16		
Moroni Benally	—	972	1.88		
Cal Nez	—	598	1.16		
Edison "Chip" Begay	—	550	1.06		
Hank Whitethorne	—	398	0.77		
Kee Yazzie Mann	—	298	0.58		
Dan Smith	—	219	0.42		
Total		51,734	100.00	41,147	100.00
Valid votes		51,734	99.40	41,147	93.17
Invalid/blank votes		313	0.60	3,015	6.83
Total votes		52,047	100.00	44,162	100.00
Registered voters/turnout		111,336	46.75	118,673	37.21
