= Sandra Jeff =

American politician

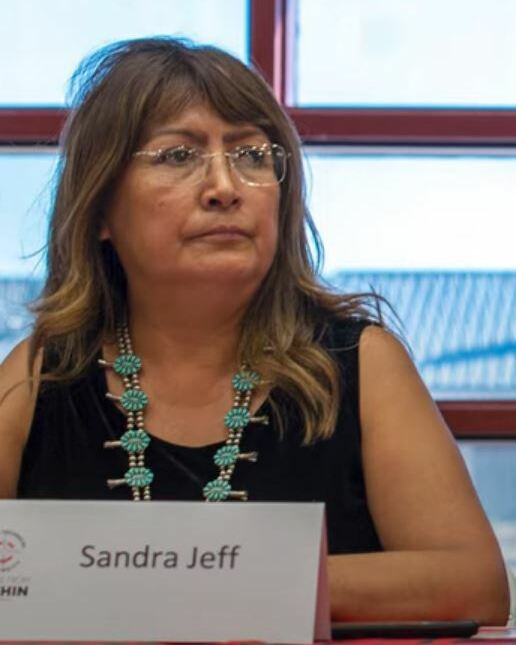
- Jeff in 2022

Member of the New Mexico House of Representatives from the 5th district
- In office 2009–2015
- Succeeded by: Doreen Wonda Johnson

Personal details
- Born: 1967 or 1968 (age 58–59)
- Party: Democratic (until 2018) Libertarian (since 2018)

Sandra D. Jeff (born 1967 or 1968) is an American politician who served as a member of the New Mexico House of Representatives from 2009 to 2015.

== Career ==
Jeff's reputation for voting with Republicans earned her a primary challenge in 2012. In 2014, Conservation Voters New Mexico was successful in having Jeff removed from the Democratic primary election ballot for reelection.

On January 12, 2018, Jeff said she would register as a Libertarian and run for Secretary of State of New Mexico. On August 24, 2018, Jeff dropped out of the race, citing “unforeseen personal obligations."

Jeff was eliminated in the primaries of the 2022 Navajo Nation presidential election.
