= Thomas Atcitty =

American politician (1933–2020)

3rd President of the Navajo Nation
- In office February 19, 1998 – July 23, 1998
- Vice President: Milton Bluehouse Sr.
- Preceded by: Albert Hale
- Succeeded by: Milton Bluehouse Sr.

2nd Vice President of the Navajo Nation
- In office November 1, 1995 – February 19, 1998
- President: Albert Hale
- Preceded by: Marshall Plummer
- Succeeded by: Milton Bluehouse Sr.

Member of the New Mexico House of Representatives from the 4th district
- In office 1981–1995

Personal details
- Born: November 1, 1933 Shiprock, Navajo Nation, New Mexico, U.S.
- Died: October 11, 2020 (aged 86) Shiprock, Navajo Nation, New Mexico, U.S.
- Party: Democratic
- Education: Taylor University; University of Colorado Boulder; Gannon University

Thomas Atcitty (November 1, 1933 – October 11, 2020) was an American politician and educator who served in the New Mexico House of Representatives as a member of the Democratic Party, 2nd Vice President of the Navajo Nation, and briefly served as the 3rd President of the Navajo Nation. He was a member of the Navajo Nation.

== Early life ==
Thomas Atcitty was born on November 1, 1933 in Shiprock. Atcitty graduated from Navajo Mission High School in 1954, and attended Taylor University, the University of Colorado, and Gannon University. He served in the United States Marine Corps.

== Career ==
=== Education ===
Atcitty served as the vice-president of the Navajo Community College during the 1970s after starting to work at the college in 1969. On October 16, 1972, President Ned Hatathli died when he shot himself while cleaning his rifle causing Atcitty to become acting president. Atcitty was selected to replace Hatathli on December 4, and later became the official third president of the college on February 8, 1973. He served as president of the college until his resignation made effective March 1, 1977.

=== Politics ===
Atcitty was elected to the New Mexico House of Representatives from the 4th district as a member of the Democratic Party and served until his resignation in January 1995. During his tenure in the New Mexico House of Representatives he served as the chairman of the Consumer and Public Affairs committee. Atcitty also served as the co-chairman of the Democratic caucus in the House of Representatives alongside Felix Nunez.

Atcitty served as Albert Hale's vice-presidential running mate during the 1994 Navajo Nation presidential election and they won defeating incumbent President Peterson Zah. He resigned from the House of Representatives to become the Vice President of the Navajo Nation. During his vice-presidency he sought the pardon of Peter MacDonald by President Bill Clinton. On February 18, 1998, President Hale resigned to avoid criminal prosecution causing Atcitty to become President of the Navajo Nation, but he only served until he was removed by the Navajo Nation Council on July 23, 1998, for violating ethic codes. During his tenure as president he was given the Medgar Evers Award by the NAACP.

== Death ==
Atcitty died from natural causes on October 11, 2020, at age 86.

Political offices
| Preceded by Albert Hale | President of the Navajo Nation; 1998 | Succeeded by Milton Bluehouse Sr. |
