= Milton Bluehouse Sr. =

President of the Navajo Nation from 1998 to 1999

Milton Bluehouse

4th President of the Navajo Nation
- In office July 24, 1998 – January 12, 1999
- Vice President: Frank Chee Willeto
- Preceded by: Thomas Atcitty
- Succeeded by: Kelsey Begaye

3rd Vice President of the Navajo Nation
- In office February 1998 – July 24, 1998
- President: Thomas Atcitty
- Preceded by: Thomas Atcitty
- Succeeded by: Frank Chee Willeto

Personal details
- Born: February 29, 1936 Ganado, Arizona, U.S.
- Died: January 14, 2019 (aged 82) Ganado, Arizona, U.S.
- Education: Arizona State University, Tempe; Northern Arizona University

Milton Bluehouse Sr. (February 29, 1936 – January 14, 2019) was the fourth president of the Navajo Nation after the Restructuring of the tribal government.

== Early life ==
Bluehouse was born in Ganado, Arizona. He served in the United States Army for three years. Bluehouse served on the Navajo Tribal Council. He also served as the vice-president in the office of his predecessor Thomas Atcitty. He assumed the presidency after some controversy involving his right to be president. As he had been an appointed vice-president, the law stated that he was not eligible to become president. The law was changed to allow him to assume the presidency.

Political offices
Preceded by Thomas Atcitty	President of the Navajo Nation; 1998–1999	Succeeded by Kelsey Begaye
