= Navajo Mountain (Chapter) =

Navajo Mountain Naatsisʼáán (Navajo)
- Chapter
- Navajo Mountain Chapter
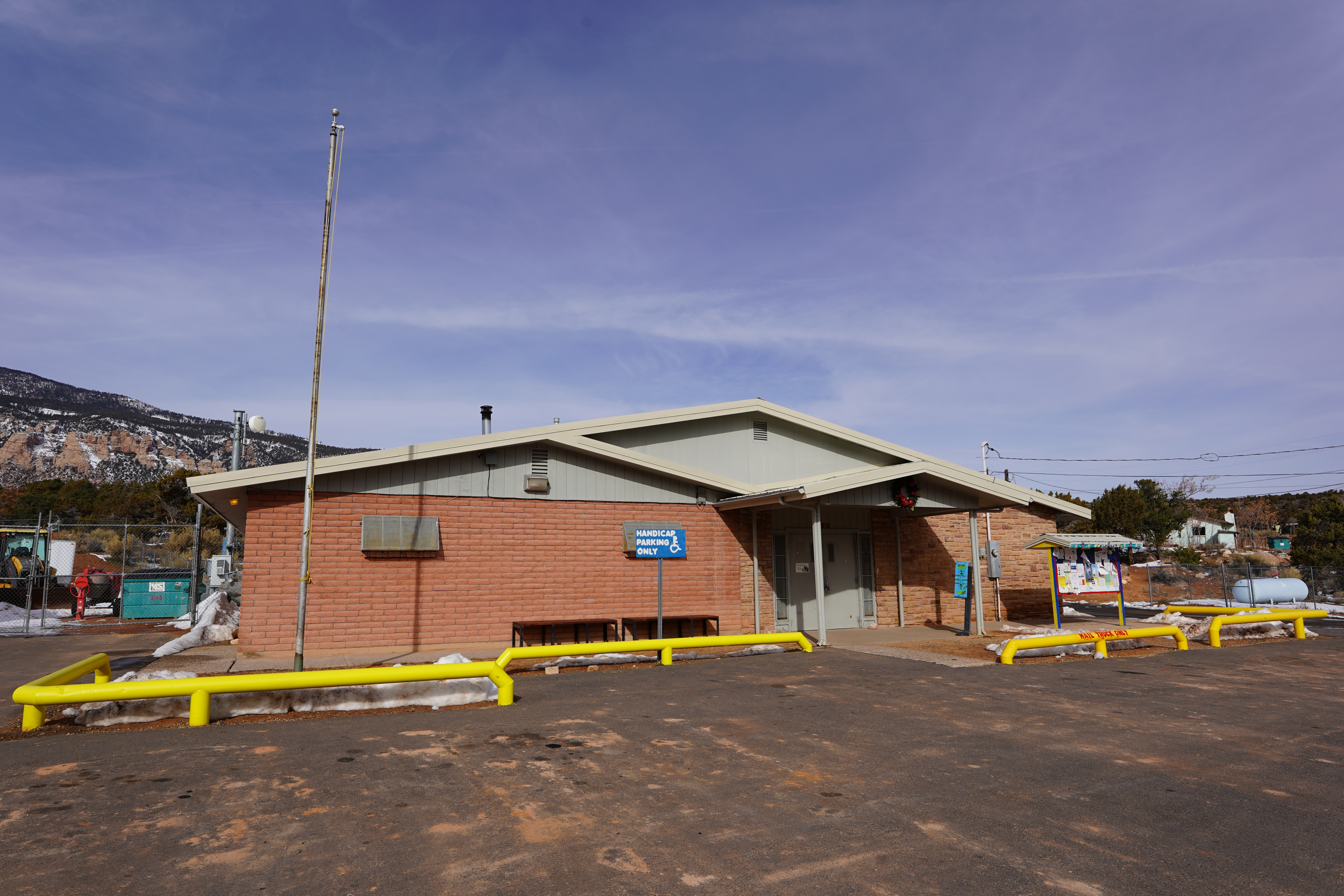
- Naatsis'áán Chapter House

- Location within the state of Utah Navajo Mountain (the United States)
- Coordinates: 37°02′06″N 110°46′50″W
- Country: United States
- State: Utah
- County: San Juan
- Elevation: 5,886 ft (1,794 m)
- Time zone: UTC-7 (Mountain (MST))
  - Summer (DST): UTC-7 (MST)
- FIPS code: 04-TS520
- GNIS feature ID: 2419031

Navajo Mountain (Navajo: Naatsisʼáán) is a chapter (governing area) straddling the Utah/Arizona border. The bulk of the chapter lies in San Juan County, Utah, with portions in Coconino and Navajo counties in Arizona. It is one of the eighteen chapters which make up the Western Agency, one of five agencies which make up the Navajo Nation. As of the 2010 census, the chapter had a total population of 542, of whom 501 were Navajo.
