= Joe Shirley Jr. =

President of the Navajo Nation from 2003 to 2011

Joe Shirley
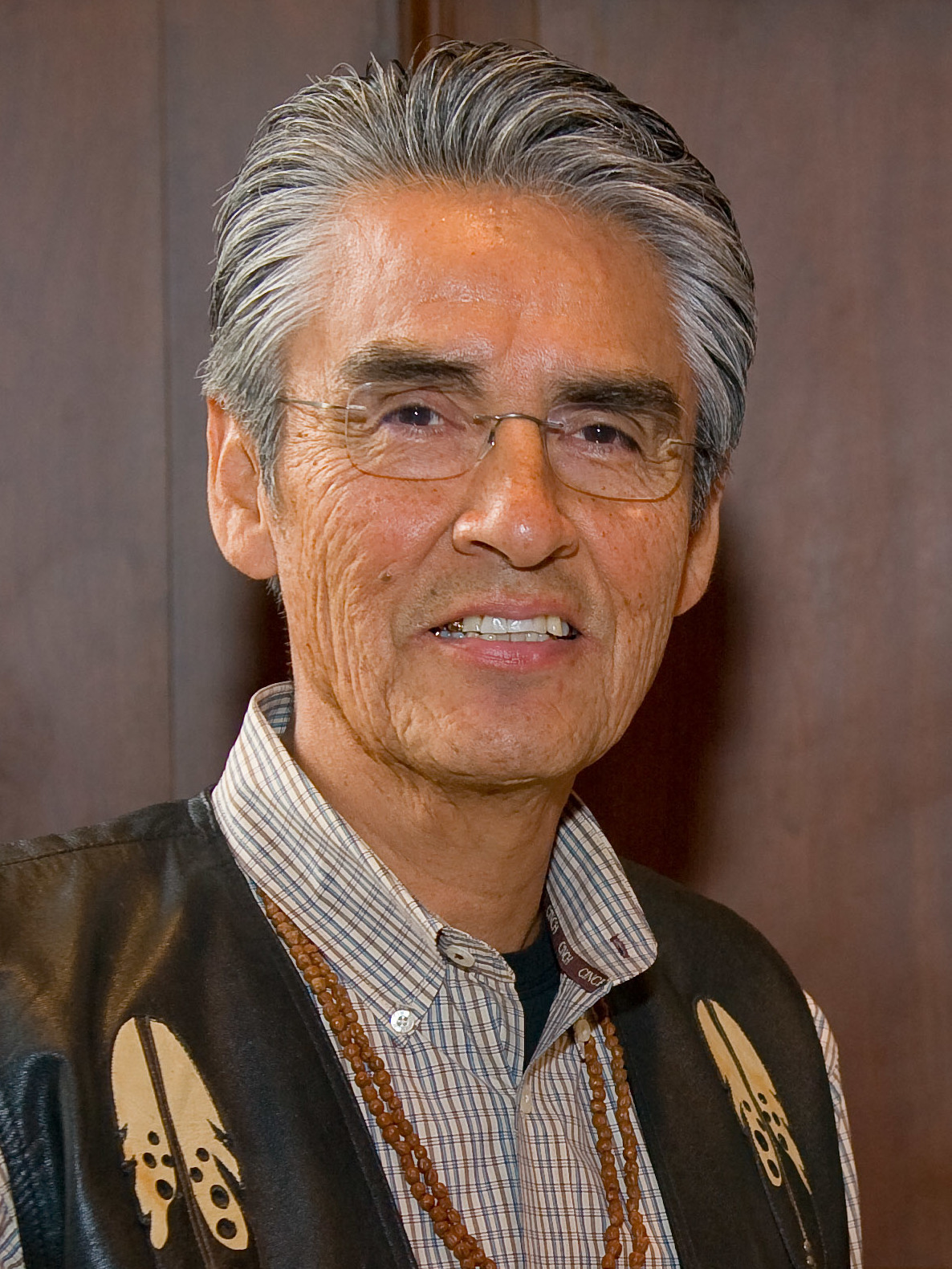
- Shirley in 2009

6th President of the Navajo Nation
- In office January 14, 2003 – January 11, 2011
- Vice President: Frank Dayish; Ben Shelly
- Preceded by: Kelsey Begaye
- Succeeded by: Ben Shelly

Member of the Navajo Nation Council
- In office 1986–1999
- Succeeded by: Harry Clark; Nelson Gorman

Personal details
- Born: December 4, 1947 (age 78) Chinle, Arizona, U.S.
- Party: Democratic
- Spouse: Vikki Begay
- Education: Magic Valley Christian College; Abilene Christian University (BS); Arizona State University, Tempe (MSW)

Joe Shirley Jr. (born December 4, 1947) is a Navajo politician who is the only two-term President of the Navajo Nation. He served as president from 2003 to 2011. He lives in Chinle, Arizona, and is Tódíchʼíiʼnii, born for Tábąąhá.

== Personal life ==
Shirley was born on the Navajo Nation in Chinle, Arizona, and raised by his grandmother since he was a toddler. Shirley is married to Vikki Shirley, with whom he shares three sons and three daughters. Vikki is Kiyaaʼáanii born for the Maʼii Deeshgiizhnii clan. Since December 2001, after the death of their daughter due to a drunk driver, the Shirley family has been heavily involved with Mothers Against Drunk Driving.

Shirley is a graduate of Chinle High School (1966). He attained an Associates of Arts Degree in 1968 from Magic Valley Christian College, a Bachelor of Science in business from Abilene Christian University (1973) and a Masters in Social Work from Arizona State University (1978). In 2005, Northern Arizona University bestowed upon Shirley an Honorary Doctorate of Humane Letters for his 35 years of continued service to the Navajo community.

== Career before politics ==
Shirley worked in social services for 15 years as a social worker where he had extensive first-hand exposure to the severe problems and devastation within Navajo communities. From 1983 to 1984, he served as executive director of the Navajo Nation Division of Social Services.

== Politics ==
=== Navajo Nation Council 1986–1999 ===
Shirley served on Navajo Nation Council from 1986 to 1999. While on the council, he was the chairman of the Labor and Manpower Committee, served on the Advisory Committee from 1987 to 1991, chairman of the Tax Commission from 1991 to 1995, member of the Intergovernmental Relations Committee and chairman of the Ethics and Rules Committee from 1995 to 1998.

=== Apache County Supervisor 1984–2003, 2012–present ===
In 1984, Joe Shirley Jr. began his term as Apache County Supervisor for District I and continued to serve for 18 years before he was elected President of the Navajo Nation. Shirley was instrumental in expanding road maintenance services and the size of the road yard, and construction of the fleet shop.

After completing his terms as Navajo Nation President, he was re-elected in 2012 and serves as chairman of the board of supervisors.

=== Navajo Nation President 2003–2011 ===
In 2002, Joe Shirley and Frank Dayish (Shirley's political running mate) entered the race for the Presidency of the Navajo Nation and defeated incumbent President Kelsey Begaye with 31,406 votes to 23,964 cast for Begaye. Joe was inaugurated as the President of the Navajo Nation on January 14, 2003, in Window Rock, AZ.

In 2006, Shirley selected Thoreau, New Mexico, Council delegate Ben Shelly as his vice presidential running mate during his second bid for Navajo Executive Office. On election day, Shirley became the first Navajo to be re-elected to the office of Navajo President since the office was reformed from a chairmanship to presidency. Former New Mexico State Representative Lynda Lovejoy was his opponent during the 2006 Navajo Nation Election. By a small majority of the popular vote, Joe Shirley and Ben Shelly were elected. They were inaugurated in January 2007.

In 2008, Shirley announced his endorsement of Senator Hillary Clinton for president of the United States. On June 14, 2008, Shirley was awarded the Barry Goldwater Human Rights Corporate Award, in recognition of support of Navajo LGBT rights after the veto of the 2005 Diné Marriage Act. In 2009, President Barack Obama made Shirley a member of the Federal Department of Homeland Security's Advisory Council. On December 11, 2009, Navajo voters voted to reduce the Navajo Nation Tribal Council from 88 to 24 members, a reform of which was described as a substantial success for Shirley's administration's reform advocacy. In 2010, Shirley's administration was investigated for impropriety. The Controversy around Desert Rock Coal Energy Plant also circulated around the Shirley Administration. In February 2014, charges were dismissed against Shirley's alleged role in discretionary spending irregularities.

=== Navajo Nation presidential election, 2015 ===
In 2014, Shirley stood as a presidential candidate with Dineh Benally as his vice president. In the primary election, Shirley garnered 10,910 votes, followed by Chris Deschene with 9,374 (the Navajo Court would later remove Deschene from the election and replace him with runner up in the Primary Russell Begaye). The Navajo Supreme Court postponed the 2014 General Election, which was later scheduled by the Navajo Nation Election Administration to be held as a Special Presidential Election on April 21, 2015, with Joe Shirley Jr. and Russell Begaye running for the Navajo Nation Presidential ticket in the rescheduled General Election. On April 21, 2015, after the 7 pm deadline for the Presidential election, Shirley and Dineh Benally received 15,439 votes (37.49%) against opponent Russell Begaye and Jonathan Nez receiving 25,745 votes (62.51%).

== Awards and appointments ==
Through the years, he has been the recipient of numerous awards and appointments. In 1996, he was appointed to the Board of Directors of the National Association of Counties in Washington, D.C. This organization comprises more than 3,000 counties throughout the United States. In 1997, he served as a member of the Advisory Committee to the President's Commission of Sustainable Communities in Washington, D.C., and from 1985 to 1991 was a member of the Public Lands Committee. Shirley has served as co-chair of both the Bureau of Indian Affairs Tribal Budget Advisory Council and the Sovereignty Protection Initiative. In 2005, he received the Sovereignty Award from the National Indian Gaming Association, the Nuclear-Free Future Award from the Franz Moll Foundation and the International Physicians for the Prevention of Nuclear War, and the Distinguished Citizen Award presented by the University of New Mexico-Gallup. In 2007, he was awarded a distinguished alumnus citation by his alma mater, Abilene Christian University. In 2009, he was appointed to the national Homeland Security Advisory Council under the Department of Homeland Security.

Political offices
Preceded by Kelsey Begaye	President of the Navajo Nation; 2003–2011	Succeeded by Ben Shelly
