= Salina, Arizona =

- Populated place
- Location within the state of Arizona Salina (the United States)
- Coordinates: 36°01′20″N 109°52′02″W
- Country: United States
- State: Arizona
- County: Apache
- Elevation: 6,542 ft (1,994 m)
- Time zone: UTC-7 (Mountain (MST))
  - Summer (DST): UTC-7 (MST)
- Area code: 928
- FIPS code: 04-62560
- GNIS feature ID: 10734

Salina, also known as Salina Springs, Salinas Springs, and Tselani, is a populated place situated in Apache County, Arizona, United States. It has an estimated elevation of 6,542 feet (1,994 m) above sea level. The name of Salina became official as a result of decision by the Board on Geographic Names in 1960.
