= Magic Valley Christian College =

Institution of higher learning

- Type: Private
- Active: 1958; 68 years ago – 1969; 57 years ago
- Affiliations: Churches of Christ
- Location: Albion, Idaho, United States

Magic Valley Christian College was an institution of higher learning located in Albion, in the U.S. state of Idaho. The school, affiliated with the Churches of Christ, opened in 1958 on the former campus of Albion State Normal School, which was leased to the new college by the State of Idaho for $100 per year.

Magic Valley Christian suffered from inadequate financial support throughout its existence, due in large part to the extremely small size of the Churches of Christ community in Idaho. The college closed its Albion campus after the spring 1969 term and relocated to Baker City, Oregon, where it was renamed Baker College. Baker College, in turn, shut down in 1970.

== Notes ==
42°24′48″N 113°35′02″W
