= Marshall Plummer =

Vice president of the Navajo Nation from 1991 to 1995

1st Vice President of the Navajo Nation
- In office January 15, 1991 – January 10, 1995
- President: Peterson Zah
- Preceded by: Office created
- Succeeded by: Thomas Atcitty

Personal details
- Born: February 25, 1948 Coyote Canyon, New Mexico
- Died: March 25, 2010 (aged 62) Phoenix, Arizona

Marshall Paul Plummer (February 25, 1948 – March 25, 2010) was the first Navajo Nation Vice President, serving from 1991 to 1995. He died on March 25, 2010, having been diagnosed with end-stage lung disease. He was mentioned in an article in the Farmington Daily Times.
