= Chris Deschene =

American politician

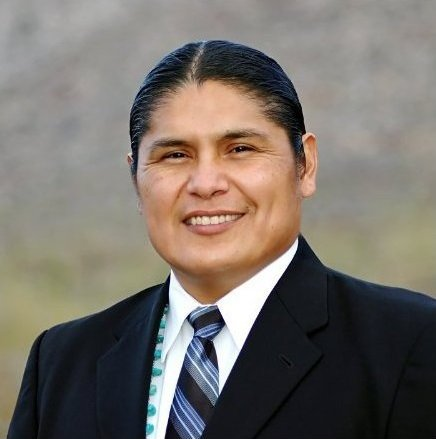

Vice President-elect of the Navajo Nation
- Assuming office January 12, 2027
- President: Crystalyne Curley (elect)
- Succeeding: Richelle Montoya

Member of the Arizona House of Representatives from the 2nd district
- In office January 2009 – January 10, 2011
- Preceded by: Albert Tom
- Succeeded by: Albert Hale

Personal details
- Born: 1970 (age 55–56) California, U.S.
- Citizenship: American; Navajo Nation
- Party: Democratic
- Education: United States Naval Academy (BS); Arizona State University, Tempe (MS, JD)

Military service
- Allegiance: United States
- Branch/service: United States Marine Corps

Christopher L. Clark Deschene (born 1970) is an American politician, attorney, and energy development expert who is the vice president-elect of the Navajo Nation. A member of the Navajo Nation, Deschene was the Democratic Party's candidate for Secretary of State in Arizona in 2010, and served as a Department of Energy official in the Barack Obama administration.

== Biography ==
Deschene was born in California, but moved with his parents, a homemaker from Dennehotso, Arizona, and a welder from Tuba City, Arizona. Deschene spent his youth in LeChee, Arizona, and attended high school in Page, Arizona. After graduating from high school in 1989, Deschene attended the United States Naval Academy, graduating in 1993 with a Bachelor of Science in mechanical engineering and a commission as a second lieutenant in the United States Marine Corps. He was deployed on several missions overseas, including the Persian Gulf and Southeast Asia. After completing two tours of active duty, Deschene continued on as a reservist for a total of 10 years of military service.

After leaving the Marines, Deschene earned a Juris Doctor from the Sandra Day O'Connor College of Law, and a Master's of Science degree in engineering from the Ira A. Fulton Schools of Engineering.

His grandfather was a Navajo code talker during World War II.

== Career ==
He subsequently co-founded Law Office of Schaff & Clark Deschene, specializing in questions of energy infrastructure. Deschene worked at this firm for a decade before joining the Obama administration in 2015.

Deschene served as a member of the Arizona House of Representatives from 2009 to 2011, representing District 2. He was member of both the Committee for Natural Resources and Rural Affairs and the Committee for Water and Energy. Prior to his election to the legislature, he was the chair of the Apache County Democratic Party from 2007 to 2008 and the chair of the Native American Democratic Caucus.

In 2010, he won the Democratic Party's nomination for Secretary of State, beating Sam Wercinski with 62.7% vs. 37.3% of the votes. He lost the general election to Ken Bennett.

In the Navajo Nation presidential election of 2015, he ran for president of the Navajo Nation, getting second place in the primary and advancing to the run off, though he was later disqualified by the Navajo Nation Office of Hearings and Appeals for failing to show fluency in the Navajo language.

In 2015, Deschene joined the United States Department of Energy as the director for the Office of Indian Energy Policy and Programs, serving under Secretary Ernest Moniz. He served in the role through the end of the administration and aided in the transition effort.

In June 2017, he joined Rosette, LLP as a partner in their Washington, D.C. office, where he practices energy law.

On July 27, 2026, he was announced by Speaker of the Navajo Nation Council Crystalyne Curley as her running mate for the 2026 presidential election, running against Justin Jones and Emily Ellison. Jones was a lawyer representing candidate Hank Whitethorne, successfully overseeing Deschene's removal from the Navajo Nation presidential election in 2015. He and Curley won in the general election by 32,094 votes to Jones and Ellison's 30,979.

Political offices
Preceded by Richelle Montoya	Vice President of the Navajo Nation; Taking office 2027	Elect
