= Lynda Lovejoy =

American politician (born 1949)

Member of the New Mexico Public Regulation Commission from the 4th district
- In office January 1, 2015 – January 1, 2019
- Preceded by: Theresa Becenti-Aguilar
- Succeeded by: Theresa Becenti-Aguilar
- In office January 1, 1999 – January 1, 2007
- Preceded by: Seat established
- Succeeded by: Carol Sloan

Member of the New Mexico Senate from the 22nd district
- In office January 22, 2007 – January 15, 2013
- Preceded by: Leonard Tsosie
- Succeeded by: Benny Shendo

Member of the New Mexico House of Representatives
- In office 1988–1998

Personal details
- Born: February 1, 1949 (age 77) Navajo Nation
- Party: Democratic
- Spouse: John Lovejoy
- Education: University of New Mexico (AA); Northern Arizona University (BS)

Lynda Morgan Lovejoy (born February 1, 1949) is an American politician. She is a former Democratic member of the New Mexico Senate.

== Early life and education ==
Her clans are Ts’ah Yisk’idnii, born for Kiyaa’áani; her maternal grandfather’s clan is Tsé Nahabiłnii and her paternal grandfather’s clan is Tó Dích’íiʼnii. Lovejoy is from Crownpoint, New Mexico.

She earned an Associate of Arts degree in elementary education from the University of New Mexico and a Bachelor of Science from Northern Arizona University.

== Career ==
She served as commissioner in the New Mexico Public Regulation Commission (PRC), 1999 to 2006. She served as chairperson of the PRC for three years and vice-chairperson for one year.

She served in the New Mexico House of Representatives from 1988 to 1998. She served as chairperson of the House Government and Urban Affairs Committee. She served as co-chairperson of the Interim Indian Affairs Committee.

She was appointed in 2007 and elected to a full term in the New Mexico Senate in 2008, representing District 22, which encompasses parts of Bernalillo, Cibola, McKinley, Rio Arriba and Sandoval counties. served as vice-chair of the Senate Corporations and Transportation Committee.

Lovejoy has also worked as a consultant for telecommunications and utilities companies.

=== Navajo Nation presidential runs ===
During the 2010 Navajo Nation primary, Lovejoy won 17,137 votes, 35.7% of total vote; her nearest challenger followed with 7,763 votes, or 16.2 percent. Compared to the 2006 presidential primary, she nearly doubled the 10,513 votes she gained in the earlier election.

Navajo Nation Vice-President Ben Shelly defeated Lovejoy in 2010.

== See also ==
- List of Native American politicians
- Native American women in politics
