= Taylor McKenzie =

Vice president of the Navajo Nation from 1999 to 2003

Taylor McKenzie (January 31, 1931 – April 13, 2007) was the first Navajo medical doctor (since 1958), the Vice President of the Navajo Nation (1999–2003, under Kelsey A. Begaye), and the first Navajo Nation Chief Medical Officer (since 2006).

He was married to Betty McKenzie and they had nine children: Judith, Kathleen, Claire, Jeremy, Patrick, Marvin, Gilbert, Michael, and Edward. Son Edward is now a doctor at Presbyterian Hospital in Albuquerque, New Mexico, United States.

McKenzie was a 1954 graduate of Wheaton College in Illinois. He studied medicine at the Baylor University School of Medicine in Houston, Texas, graduating in 1958. He studied under the famous heart surgeon, Dr. Michael DeBakey, after whom he named his first child, Michael.

McKenzie died April 13, 2007 at Presbyterian Hospital in Albuquerque, New Mexico.
