= Frank Dayish =

Vice president of the Navajo Nation from 2003 to 2007

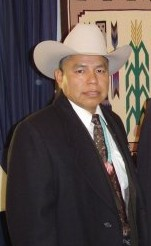

6th Vice President of the Navajo Nation
- In office January 14, 2003 – January 9, 2007
- President: Joe Shirley Jr.
- Preceded by: Taylor McKenzie
- Succeeded by: Ben Shelly

Personal details
- Born: 1958 (age 67–68) Shiprock, New Mexico, U.S.
- Spouse: Virginia Dayish
- Education: San Juan College (AA); New Mexico State University (BBA); University of Maryland, College Park (MBA)

Frank Dayish Jr. (born 1958) is an American politician, who was the 6th Vice President of the Navajo Nation under President Joe Shirley Jr.
