= Rex Lee Jim =

Navajo politician and writer (1962–2026)

- Mazii Dineltsoi
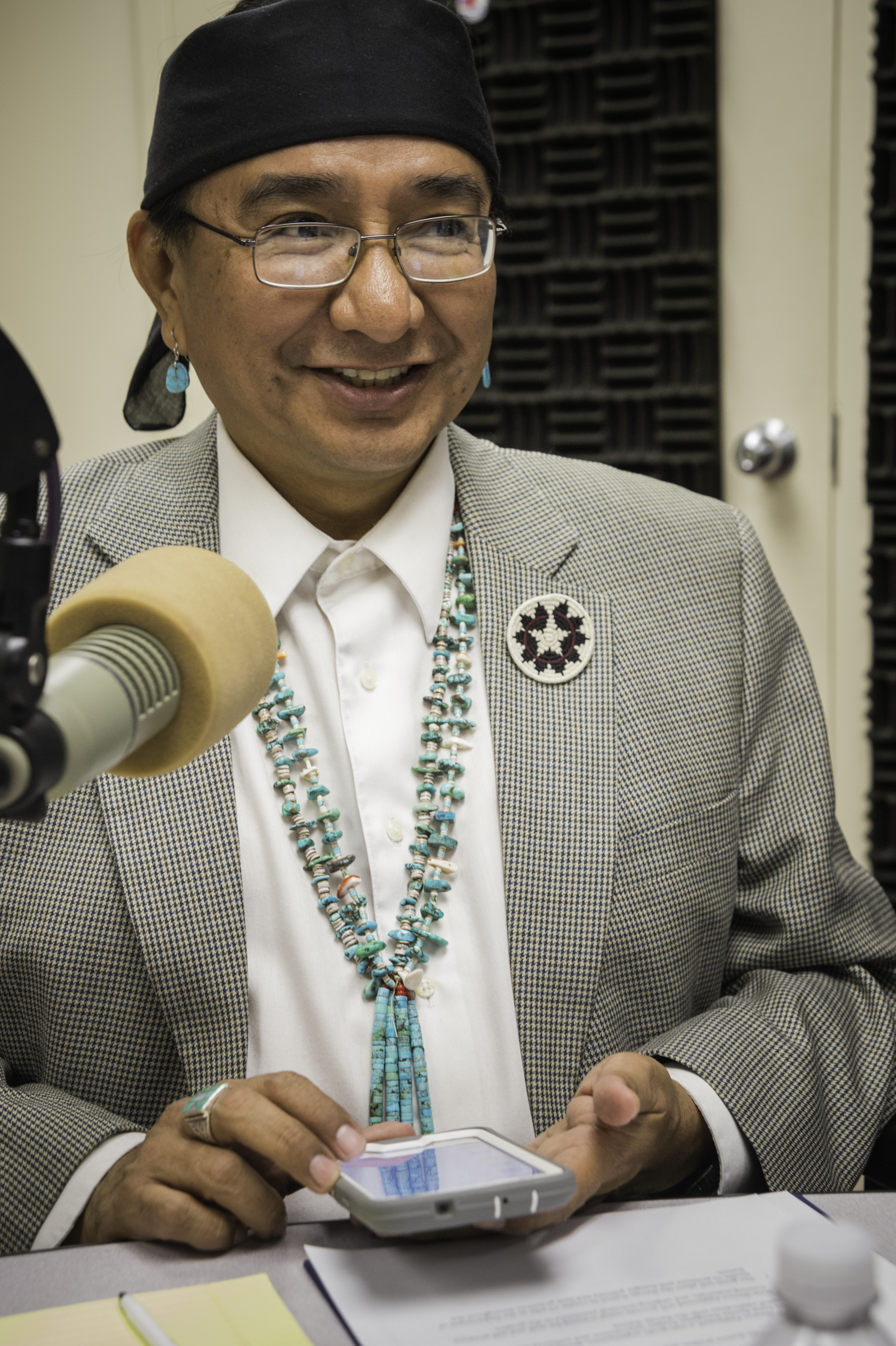

8th Vice President of the Navajo Nation
- In office January 11, 2011 – May 12, 2015
- President: Ben Shelly
- Preceded by: Ben Shelly
- Succeeded by: Jonathan Nez

Member of the 20th & 21st Navajo Nation Council
- In office January 14, 2003 – January 11, 2011
- Preceded by: Raymond Jones
- Succeeded by: Nelson Begaye

Personal details
- Born: 1962 Rock Point, Arizona, U.S.
- Died: February 24, 2026 (aged 63) Albuquerque, New Mexico, U.S.
- Citizenship: United States, Navajo Nation

Rex Lee Jim (Navajo: Mazii Dineltsoi; 1962 – February 24, 2026) was an American politician and writer. As a Navajo Council Delegate and Vice President of the Navajo Nation, he served under President Ben Shelly. Jim died on February 24, 2026, at the age of 63.

== Early life and education ==
Jim was born in Tsédildǫ́’ii, Arizona to a mother from the Kinłichíi’nii (Red House People) and a father of the Táchii’nii (Red Streak Running into Water People). His maternal grandfather was Kinyaa’áanii (Towering House People) and his paternal grandfather was Naakaii Dine’é (Mexican People). His mother was a weaver and housewife and his father was a farmer and rancher. He had seven siblings and was the fourth-born child of his parents.

His maternal grandfather was a medicine man and taught Jim traditional Navajo blessingways. Because of this education, Jim did not enter the school system until age eight.

He was a student at Rock Point Community School and later attended Newfound School in North Carolina for one year before graduating high school at Colorado Rocky Mountain School. He received an undergraduate degree from Princeton University, where he majored in English. While there, he restarted the university's dormant Native American group and became its president. He received a master's degree from the Bread Loaf School of English at Middlebury College, Vermont. At the time of his death, he was in the process of completing a PhD at Arizona State University.

He was a fluent speaker of Navajo, English, and Spanish, and was literate in all three languages.

== Career ==
=== Teaching and writing ===
Throughout his career, Jim taught at a number of different institutions. Jim was a faculty member in English and Diné Studies and was dean of the School of Diné Studies and Education at Diné College. He was also an instructional specialist at the Center for Diné Teacher Education.

At one point, he was also a teacher at Rock Point Community School, where he had himself attended school.

=== Politics ===
Jim served on the 20th and 21st Navajo Nation Council, from 2003 to 2011. While in this position, he also served as chairman of the Public Safety Committee. As a delegate, he also served as a representative to the United Nations from the Navajo Nation, in which capacity he helped draft the United Nations Declaration on the Rights of Indigenous Peoples.

In 2010, he announced his candidacy for the position of President of the Navajo Nation, but he finished fourth in the primary. Ben Shelly, who had finished second, selected him as his vice presidential candidate, and the pair won the election. Jim was Vice President of the Navajo Nation from 2011 until 2015. He ran for president a second time in 2018 but was not elected.

=== Other work ===
He was a medicine man and a blessingway singer at the Diné School of Ceremonial Science.

== Personal life ==
Jim never married. He raised his sister's five children, who lived in his home near Rock Point and for whom he was the legal guardian.

He died on February 24, 2026, at the age of 63.

== Selected works ==
Jim wrote in Navajo, Spanish, and English.

=== Poetry ===
- Áhí Ni’ Nikisheegiizh
- Saad
- Saad Lá Tah Hózhóón
- Dúchas / Táá Kóó Diné

=== Other ===
- Dancing Voices: Wisdom of the American Indian (as editor)

Jim was also a playwright.
