= Myron Lizer =

Former Vice President of the Navajo Nation

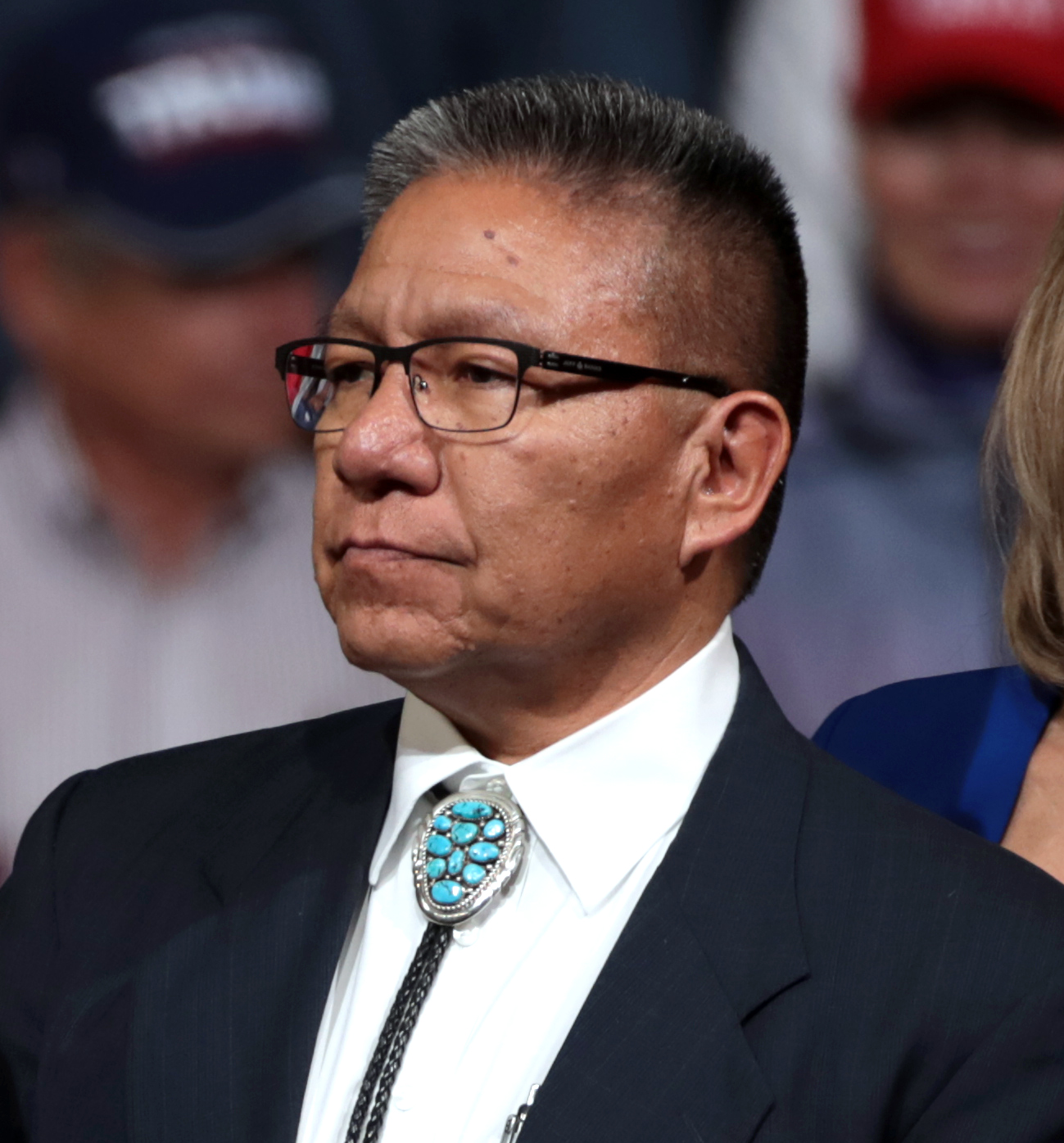
- Lizer in 2020

10th Vice President of the Navajo Nation
- In office January 15, 2019 – January 10, 2023
- President: Jonathan Nez
- Preceded by: Jonathan Nez
- Succeeded by: Richelle Montoya

Personal details
- Born: May 26 Ganado, Arizona, U.S.
- Party: Republican
- Spouse: Dottie Lizer
- Education: Fort Lewis College (BBA)

Myron Lizer (born May 26) is a Navajo politician and businessman who served as the 10th vice president of the Navajo Nation under President Jonathan Nez.

== Early life ==
Lizer was born in Ganado, Arizona. He worked in various retail management positions before finishing his Bachelor of Business Administration from Fort Lewis College. After graduation, he worked as an accountant briefly before beginning his entrepreneurship.

== Career ==
Lizer owns an Ace Hardware in Window Rock, Arizona. Lizer is a Baptist Christian and formerly served as the president of the school board for the Rehoboth Christian School in Rehoboth, New Mexico from September 2016 to February 2023, preceded by Dan Meester and succeeding by Chris Vicente. Lizer has also written articles for The Santa Fe New Mexican. A Republican and social conservative, he was the running mate of Democrat Jonathan Nez in the 2018 tribal election, which they won with 66% of the vote.

He is a supporter of Donald Trump and spoke at the 2020 Republican National Convention, highlighting Trump's achievements for tribal communities, particularly on the issues of Missing and Murdered Indigenous People and the COVID-19 pandemic. He also joined Franklin Graham at the 2020 Prayer March in Washington D.C., praying for the country at the World War II Memorial. In October 2020, he joined Donald Trump Jr., Carlyle Begay, and others in launching the Native Americans for Trump coalition in Williams, Arizona.

Lizer announced in March 2022 that he would run for Arizona's 2nd congressional district in the 2022 election, but did not earn enough signatures to file.

Lizer endorsed Trump again in 2024, and joined Cherokee U.S. senator Markwayne Mullin on the campaign trail. While at a rally in New Mexico, Lizer employed populist language in speaking directly to Native voters and praised Trump's leadership, saying "it's that kind of leadership that's going to lead Indian Country and our tribal nations into that next frontier". After 17 Native American-majority counties flipped Republican, Lizer said in an interview with Rachel Campos-Duffy "it was a long time coming...the foreign conflicts and the threats of the wars looming, really activated our people. We don't want our children to have to go to some far away land and fight."

== Personal life ==
Lizer is half Navajo through his father's side and half Comanche through his mother's side; he is of the Naałání (Comanche People Clan) born for Tó’áhání (Near The Water Clan), his maternal grandfather's clan is Naałání (Comanche People Clan), and paternal grandfather's clan is Tł’ááshchí’í (Red Cheek People).

== See also ==
- List of Native American politicians
