= Russell Begaye =

President of the Navajo Nation from 2015 to 2019

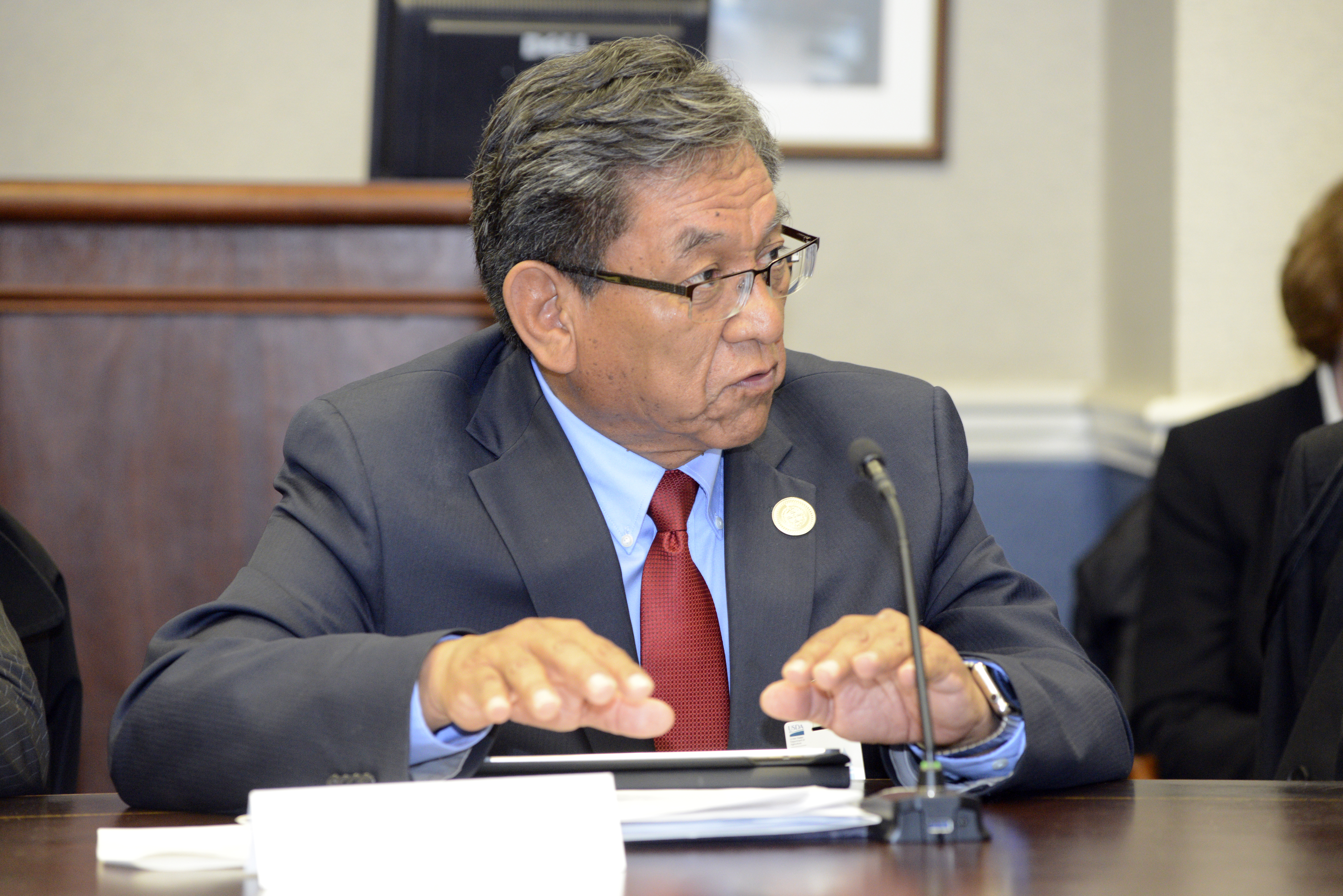

8th President of the Navajo Nation
- In office May 12, 2015 – January 15, 2019
- Vice President: Jonathan Nez
- Preceded by: Ben Shelly
- Succeeded by: Jonathan Nez

Member of the Navajo Nation Council
- In office January 11, 2011 – January 13, 2015
- President: Ben Shelly
- Vice President: Rex Lee Jim
- Preceded by: Leonard Anthony; Pete Atcitty
- Succeeded by: Tom Chee

Personal details
- Born: May 4, 1951 Shiprock, New Mexico, U.S.
- Party: Democratic
- Education: University of California, Los Angeles (BA) Southwestern Baptist Theological Seminary (MDiv)

Russell Begaye is a Navajo politician who served as the 8th president of Navajo Nation from May 2015 to January 2019. He was the second New Mexican Navajo to hold the Navajo Presidency.

== Early life and education ==
Born in Shiprock, New Mexico, Begaye graduated from the University of California, Los Angeles (UCLA) in 1974 with a degree in political science. In 1977, Begaye received his Master of Divinity degree from the Southwestern Baptist Theological Seminary in Fort Worth, Texas.

== Career ==
From 1977 to 2011, Begaye worked for the North American Mission Board. Begaye served on the Navajo Nation Council from 2011 until his election as President of the Navajo Nation on April 4, 2015. Begaye was sworn into office on May 12, 2015 and served until January 8, 2019, when he was succeeded by Vice President Jonathan Nez.

Begaye is currently a candidate for Navajo Nation Council (Shiprock) in the 2022 election. Begaye lost his election to incumbent Eugenia Charles-Newton.

== Personal life ==
Begaye was married to Kyoon Chung Begaye, a dentist in the Atlanta metropolitan area. Due to the absence of Kyoon Chung Begaye in Navajo Nation affairs, the wife of Vice President Jonathan Nez took on the informal duties of First Lady of the Navajo Nation. In 2016, Begaye stated that his seventeen year-long marriage with Kyoon Chung Begaye was over. Begaye is not a native speaker of Navajo.

Political offices
Preceded by Ben Shelly	President of the Navajo Nation; 2015–2019	Succeeded by Jonathan Nez
