= Navajo Nation Council =

Branch of the Navajo Nation government in the US

Navajo Nation Council Béésh bąąh dah siʼání

Type
- Type: Unicameral

History
- Founded: 1923

Leadership
- Council Speaker: Crystalyne Curley

Structure
- Seats: 24
- Length of term: 4 Years, no limits

Elections
- Last election: November 8, 2022
- Next election: November 3, 2026

Meeting place
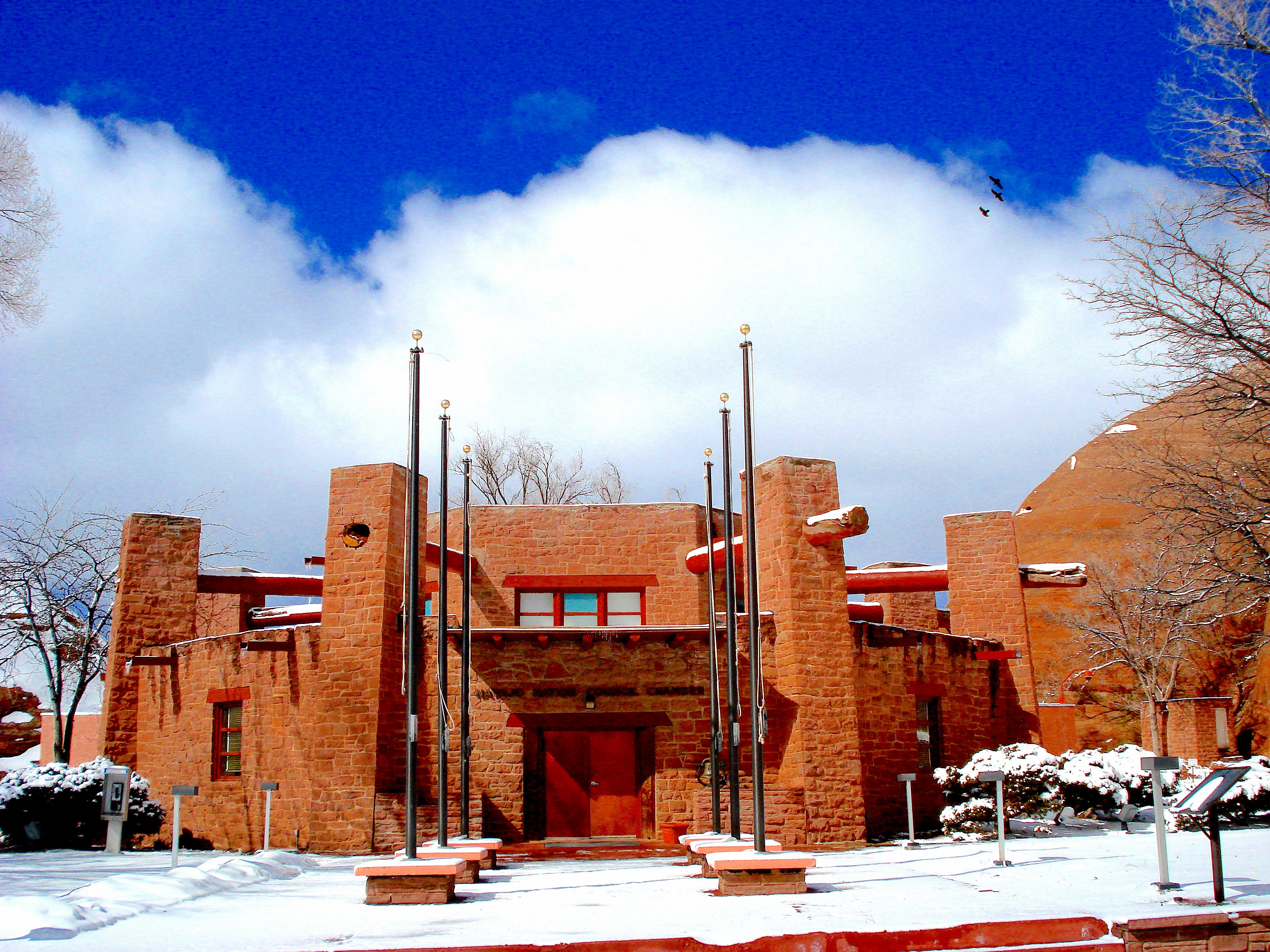
- Navajo Nation Council Chamber, a National Historic Landmark

Website
- www.navajonationcouncil.org

The Navajo Nation Council (Navajo: Béésh bąąh dah siʼání) is the Legislative Branch of the Navajo Nation government. The council meets four times per year, with additional special sessions, at the Navajo Nation Council Chamber, which is in Window Rock, Arizona.

The council is composed of 24 district delegates, or councilors, chosen by direct election, who represent 110 municipal chapters within the states of Arizona, New Mexico, and Utah. Delegates must be members of the Navajo Nation and be at least twenty-five years of age. Delegate offices are at the Navajo Nation governmental campus in Window Rock.

The council selects a speaker, chosen from among all delegates, to preside over the day-to-day functions of the council for a two-year term.

== Power and jurisdiction ==
As codified in Section 101 of the Navajo Nation Code: (2 N.N.C. § 101(A)) The Legislative Branch shall consist of the Navajo Nation Council and any entity established under the Navajo Nation Council. (2 N.N.C § 101(B)) The Legislative Branch shall not be amended unless approved by majority of all registered Navajo voters through a referendum.

== Navajo legislative overview ==
(2 N.N.C. § 102 (B-G)) The Navajo Nation Council reserves all powers not delegated and supervises those that are delegated; has the power to discipline and regulate the conduct of its members; has the authority to promulgate rules, regulations, and procedures for the conduct of its meetings and of its committees; confirms the appointments of all division directors upon recommendation from the appropriate oversight committee; and shall establish standing committees and delegate such authority to such committees as it deems necessary and proper.

=== Line of succession ===
§1006 of the Navajo Code instructs that should vacancy occur in the Office of President and Vice President, the Speaker shall serve as President of the Navajo Nation until a special election is held. The Code further states that the Speaker shall then act concurrently as Speaker and President, and that the speakership shall not be considered vacated.

== Current 25th Navajo Nation Council Delegate Info ==
On January 10, 2023, the delegates of the 25th Navajo Nation Council took the oath of office.

Delegate	Chapter(s)
Titus Jay Nez	Churchrock, Iyanbito, Mariano Lake, Pinedale, Smith Lake, Thoreau
Arbin Mitchell	Klagetoh, Wide Ruins, Houck, Lupton, Nahata Dziil
Helena Nez Begay	Coppermine, K'aii'to, LeChee, Tonalea/Red Lake, Bodaway/Gap
Norman M. Begay	Alamo, Ramah, Tohajiilee
Eugenia Charles-Newton	Shiprock
Shawna Ann Claw	Chinle
Amber Kanazbah Crotty	Cove, Toadlena/Two Grey Hills, Red Valley Tse'alnaozt'i'i', Sheepsprings, Beclabito, Gadiiahi/To'Koi
Crystalyne Curley	Tachee/Blue Gap, Many Farms, Nazlini, Tselani/Cottonwood, Low Mountain
Lester Charles Yazzie	Baahaali, Chi Chil Tah, Manuelito, Red Rock, Rock Springs, Tsayatoh
Herman M. Daniels	Tsah Bii Kin, Navajo Mountain, Shonto, Oljato
Vince James	Jeddito, Cornfields, Ganado, Kinlichee, Steamboat
Brenda Jesus	Oaksprings, St. Michaels
Casey Allen Johnson	Cameron, Coalmine Canyon, Birdsprings, Leupp, Tolani Lake
Andy Nez	Crystal, Fort Defiance, Red Lake, Sawmill
Rickie Nez	T'iistoh Sikaad, Nenahnezad, Upper Fruitland, Tse' Daa' Kaan, Newcomb, San Juan
Nathan Notah	Coyote Canyon, Mexican Springs, Naschitti, Tohatchi, Bahastl'a'a'
Shaandiin Parrish	Chilchinbeto, Dennehotso, Kayenta
Germaine Simonson	Hard Rock, Forest Lake, Pinon, Black Mesa, Whippoorwill
Danny Simpson	Becenti, Lake Valley, Nahodishgish, Standing Rock, Whiterock, Huerfano, Nageezi, Crownpoint
Carl R. Slater	Lukachukai, Round Rock, Tsaile/Wheatfields, Tse Ch'izhi/Rough Rock, Rock Point
George Tolth	Littlewater, Pueblo Pintado, Torreon, Whitehorse Lake, Baca/Brewitt, Casamero Lake, Ojo Encino, Counselor
Otto Tso	To' Nanees Dizi
Curtis Yanito	Mexican Water, To'likan, Teesnospos, Aneth, Red Mesa
Cherilyn Yazzie	Dilcon, Indian Wells, Teesto, Whitecone, Greasewood Springs

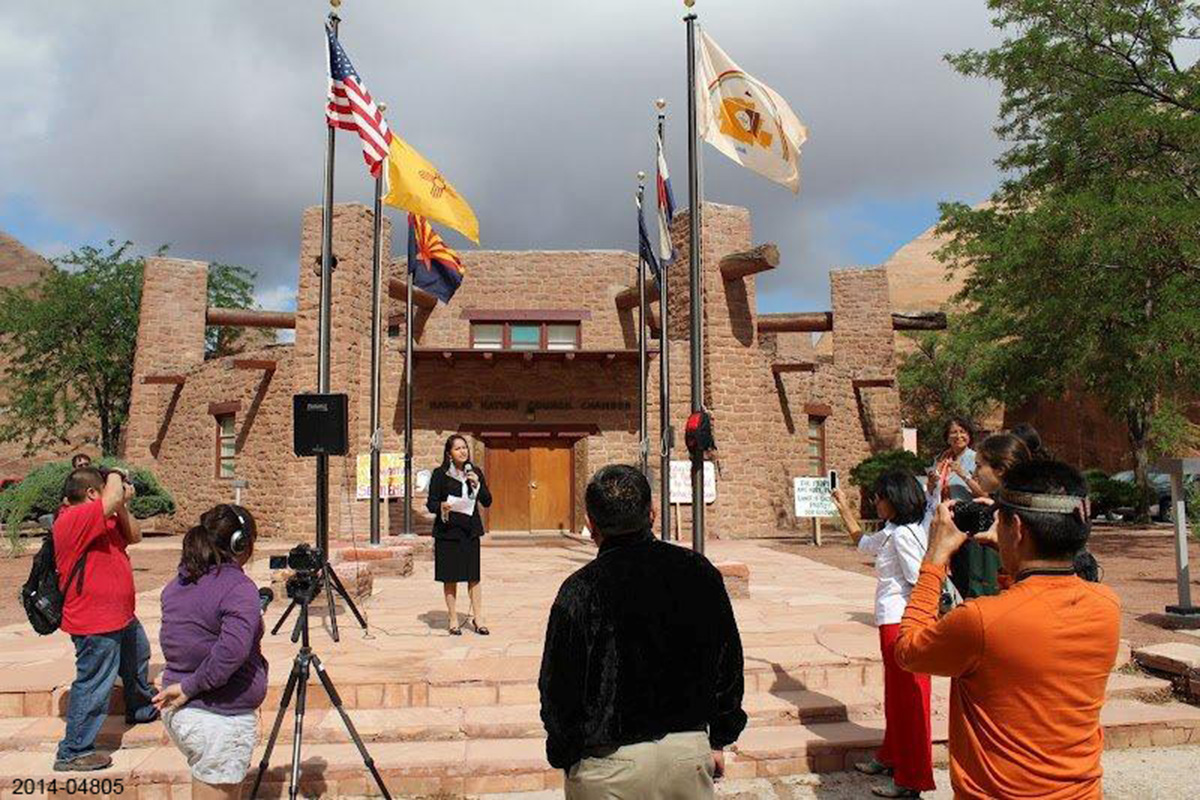
Navajo Council

25th Navajo Nation Council committees and subcommittees as listed at the Council website.

=== Standing committees ===
- Navajo Nation Council
- Naabik’íyáti’ Committee
- Budget and Finance Committee
- Health, Education and Human Services Committee
- Law and Order Committee
- Resources and Development Committee

=== Subcommittees ===
- Diné Bizaad Subcommittee
- Gaming Subcommittee
- Navajo–Hopi Land Commission
- Navajo Indian Irrigation Project Subcommittee
- Navajo Sexual Assault Prevention Subcommittee
- Quadrilateral Agreement Task Force
- State Task Force Subcommittee
- Title II Reform Subcommittee

== History ==
=== Naachʼid ===
Pre-conquest Diné (Navajo) society was highly decentralized, with the basic political unit being settlements of ten to forty families led by two Naataanii (headmen/headwomen), one of whom was responsible for peacetime matters and the other of whom was responsible for wartime matters. Politically binding communities together was the Naachʼid, a political-ceremonial gathering of twelve Peace Naataanii and twelve War Naataanii which usually met every 2 to 4 years. Naach'id would be chaired by a Peace Naataanii in peacetime and by a War Naataanii in wartime, with the chair being selected through an informal consensus of the assembled Naataanii. The Naach'id itself would consist of religious ceremonies and open meetings. Some sources suggest that peacetime Naach'id were primarily ceremonial affairs, with the political functions only coming to the forefront in the face of external threats. In such perilous times, Naach'id could be assembled outside of their regular schedule. In peacetime as in wartime, decisions reached at the Naach'id were purely advisory.

=== 1922 to the 15th council ===
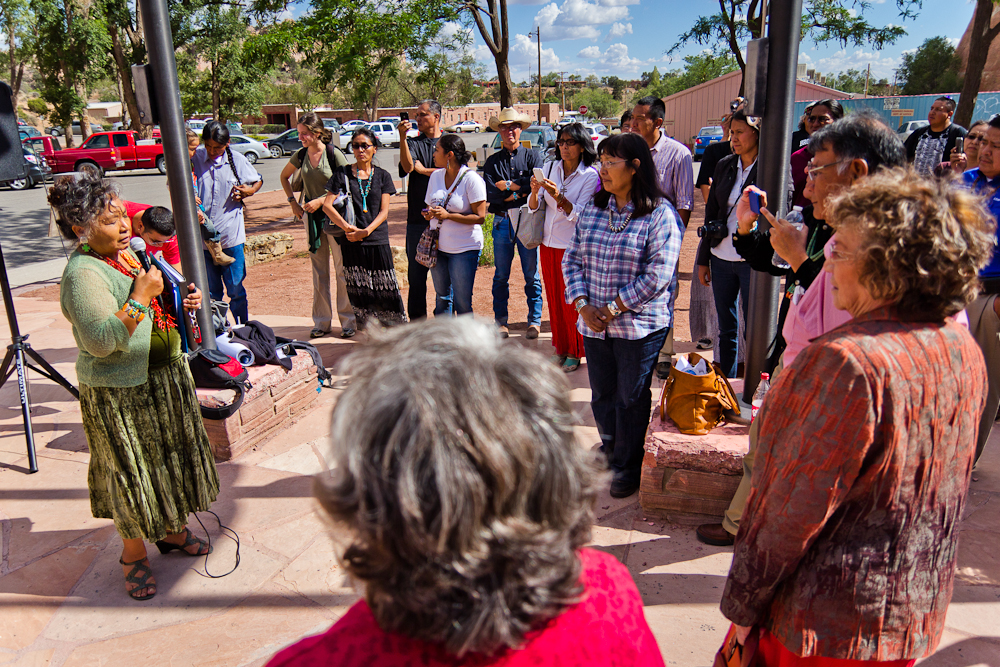
Former Navajo Council delegate Katherine Benally [left] speaking to her constituency after the defeat of the proposed Navajo-Hopi Little Colorado River Water Rights Settlement Act.

A three-man Navajo Business Council was created in 1922 by the U.S. Secretary of the Interior in order to grant mineral leases on the Navajo reservation, which had previously required the approval of three-quarters of the adult male population. Following legal pushback, this was replaced in 1923 by the Navajo Tribal Council, which would be composed of twelve delegates and twelve alternates. The Council would meet once a year for approximately two days, and had to be called by the Indian Commissioner and supervised by a federal representative. At its first meeting, the Council signed away its authority to approve oil and gas leases to the Indian Commissioner. In return, the Navajo Nation was promised more land that could be used for subsistence farming and sheep grazing. Until it reclaimed its leasing power in 1933, the Council was essentially only an advisory body.

After refusing to adopt Commissioner of Indian Affairs John Collier's Indian Reorganization Act in 1934 and suffering a crisis of legitimacy because of their approval of massively unpopular Livestock Reductions, the Navajo Tribal Council began constitutional reform in 1937. The Secretary of the Interior vetoed the proposed constitution, advising the seventy constitutional delegates to instead elect themselves as the new Navajo Tribal Council. This advice was followed, and the Secretary issued them the "Rules for the Tribal Council," a set of by-laws that still constitutes the foundation of the modern Navajo Nation Council. Coinciding with the passage of the Navajo-Hopi Long Range Rehabilitation Act and its associated revenue flows, the Council began in the 1950s to expand its power, established an executive and legislative branch of government, and incorporated the preexisting Chapter system into its fold.

Until 1984, the Navajo Tribal Council and Navajo Nation had been supported by funding from the wealth of natural resources on the reservation. In 1984, however, the council established the Permanent Trust Fund, into which 12% of all revenue each year would be deposited. Funds would first become available in 2004.

=== 16th council (1987–1990) ===
The name Navajo Nation Council (sometimes called the Navajo Nation Tribal Council) came into use around the middle of 1989. The name change occurred with the Title II Amendments of 1989 which established the three-branch government system used at Window Rock today. This created a clear delineation of executive and legislative powers, vested leadership of the executive branch in the President and Vice President, and created the offices of Speaker of the Council and Speaker Pro Tem.

== 17th council (1991–1994) ==
The 17th council was seated in 1991.

== 18th council (1995–1998) ==
The 18th council was seated in January 1995.

== 19th council (1999–2002) ==
The 19th council was seated in January 1999.

In 2001, the council approved a service agreement with OnSat, a Utah-based Internet provider. OnSat was to receive $1.9 million in the first year of contract to provide the 110 chapters with satellite bandwidth.

== 20th council (2003–2006) ==
The 20th council was seated in January 2003. Lawrence T. Morgan was elected Speaker of the Council.

- BCDS Manufacturing Inc.
  - From 2003 to 2007, the council had heavily invested in a biochemical firm to expand operations in Shiprock chapter. The firm's chief executive officer was later found to be embezzling tribal assets for personal use. These findings were never used to file criminal or civil complaints against BCDS, their executives, or share holders.
  - The council aimed to partner with BCDS, an industrial investment successfully advocated for by the Shiprock chapter board, to build an economic industrial base there. From 2003 to 2004, the Navajo government invested an estimated $300,000 in the company and retained a 51% ownership stake. BCDS had originally proposed to switch operational function and expand its facility in Shiprock chapter. The loan guarantee ultimately would cost the Navajo Nation approximately $2 million. The loan came from a tribal fund used as collateral for small businesses.
- Permanent trust fund
  - Fund matures.

=== Mid-term ===
In 2005, Speaker Lawrence T. Morgan was elected for his second term as Speaker of the Council.

- BCDS Manufacturing Inc.
  - In 2005, the council allowed BCDS to receive a loan of over $2 million from the Navajo Dam escrow account. None of the monies were used for their originally intended purpose. It was reported later that over $1 million was spent on the lavish lifestyle of the chief executive officer and on luxury homes at Aztec and Farmington.
- OnSat
  - Later in 2005, a tribal audit found discrepancies regarding a service contract with internet provider OnSat Technologies, to provide the chapters with Wireless broadband.

== 21st council (2007–2010) ==
The 21st council was seated in January 2007. Speaker Lawrence T. Morgan was elected for a third term after winning a run-off election against Delegate Harold Wauneka of Fort Defiance.

- BCDS Manufacturing Inc.
  - In June 2007, Budget and Finance Committee Chairman Lorenzo Bates revealed that the council did not exercise prudent enough due diligence before investing in BCDS.
  - In a special session held on July 17, 2008, the Council declared involvement with BCDS a total loss.
- OnSat
  - A 2007 tribal audit found that OnSat had overbilled for service and that the tribe had not complied with procurement policy regarding the competitive bidding process to select OnSat. OnSat found its federal E-rate program agreements in jeopardy. The program reimbursed between 85% and 90% of the costs associated to provide internet services to the tribe's 110 municipal chapter houses.

=== 2008 ===
==== President announces election to reduce council to 24 ====
On April 29, Navajo Nation President Joe Shirley Jr. proposed reducing the Navajo Council from 88 members to 24 members. The election would change the dynamics of the council in 2011.

- OnSat
  - OnSat service was disrupted in 2008 over nonpayment disagreements.
- BCDS
  - In December 2008, the tribe and the Council were forced to pay outstanding debt related to the bad loan made to BCDS in 2005. JP Morgan Chase received $2.2 million from tribal accounts.

=== Mid-term ===
In January 2009, Speaker Morgan was reelected speaker, to a fourth term. The election made him the first speaker to serve eight years in that capacity in the Council's modern history. President Shirley addressed the Council in the annual State of the Navajo Nation address on January 24, 2009. Shirley spoke of his conviction of the need to develop a new governing document for the Navajo Nation. Shirley had campaigned to return government to the Diné by government reform.

- Shirley ouster
  - During the first week of October 2009, the Council met in private and special sessions. Then on October 26, the council voted 48–22 to remove President Shirley from his official duties. The council had originally included removal of Vice President Shelley as well. Allegations had been swirling around the four-corners states alleging improper dealings with Utah-based OnSat Technologies, and a biochemical company at Shiprock, New Mexico. Shirley's chief of staff and other members of the senior staff were also removed.
  - OnSat CEO Dave Stephens and former Navajo Nation Telecommunications Regulatory Office director Ernest Franklin were not targeted in this action.
  - On October 27, 2009, members of the Council released a statement addressing the allegations of retaliation and denying them.
- Discretionary spending
  - In December 2009, the Council called for a special prosecutor to look into President Shirley's relationship with two companies that had operated on the reservation. Attorney General Louis Denetsosie focused the investigation on the tribe's contractual relationship with the Utah-based satellite internet company OnSat; the $2.2 million loan guarantee to BCDS Manufacturing Inc.; and payments from the council's discretionary fund to family members of several legislative-branch employees.
- 24 votes and the presidential line-item veto
  - In a special election held on December 15, 2009, tribal members voted 61% in favor of reducing the Navajo Nation Council from 88 members to 24 members. In the same special election, tribal members voted 59% in favor of allowing the President of the Navajo Nation to perform a line-item veto.

=== 2010 ===
At the meeting of the council on January 13, 2010, Council Delegate Jonathan Nez announced changes to Title 22 of the Navajo Nation Code that would take place in the wake of the majority of the tribe's membership voting to reduce the size of the council to 24 members. In a decision on May 28, 2010, the Navajo Nation Supreme Court ordered immediate implementation of a redistricting plan.

- Probe of the council's discretionary funds
  - Following a three-judge panel's review of three applications, the special division of the Window Rock district court named Alan Balaran as special prosecutor, to begin work in early February 2011. Balaran, who had served as the court-appointed special master in the Cobell Indian Trust Fund case, would act under the jurisdiction of the special division. Balaran's investigation was later expanded to include a tribal ranch program and discretionary funds given to the Shirley administration.
  - In October 2010, a special prosecutor for the Navajo justice department filed charges against members of the then 88-member Navajo Council, three weeks before the November 2 election. The investigation returned findings of serious misuse of discretionary funds. The funds were designed to be made available at the direction of lawmakers for any number of community causes, activities, and emergencies deemed appropriate by council delegates.
  - Attorney General Denetsosie outlined allegations that centered on an elaborate conspiracy of members of the council to give discretionary funds to family members. The scheme involved participating members hiding the transactions behind the vagueness of the law establishing the funds, and the loosely audited dispersal of funds from the legislators' offices. The investigation and trials would continue to the end of the 22nd Council.
  - Suspected delegates were served official complaints just before the Council convened for the fourth day of their Fall 2010 session.
  - In early November 2010, the Council was unhappy with the special prosecutor's focus on the legislature's misuse of discretionary funds, and it organized the removal of several functionaries that the Council thought were responsible. On November 4, 2010, the council voted 42–0, with two delegates abstaining, to order legislation terminating the employment of Attorney General Denetsosie and his deputy, D. Harrison Tso.
  - On December 23, the council opposed the removal of the deputy attorney general, in a 65–3 vote. Another bill to remove the attorney general was introduced but not debated.

== 22nd council (2011–2014) ==
=== 24 Votes ===
On January 11, 2011, the new, smaller 24-member council was seated, and the restructuring of the legislative branch began. On January 24, 2011, Delegate Johnny Naize (Blue Gap-Tachee/Cottonwood-Tselani/Low Mountain/Many Farms/Nazlini) was selected as speaker.

In May 2011, President Ben Shelly signed council resolution CAP-10-11, sent to him by the council, amending Title II of the Navajo Code. Among the changes in the law was the reorganization of existing standing committees to match the 24 vote membership.

=== Mid-term ===
In January 2013, the council reelected Speaker Naize to a second term.

- BCDS
  - In 2013, Hak Ghun, 62, of Durango, Colorado, was found guilty of tax evasion regarding his involvement with misdealings at BCDS. Ghun had funneled $1,078,170 in corporate funds to his personal accounts between 2005 and 2007, and had failed to pay taxes to the IRS.
- Discretionary spending debacle and resignation of Speaker Naize
  - In December 2013, a special prosecutor appointed by the council charged Speaker Naize with 10 counts of bribery and 1 count of conspiracy. Naize was charged along with former delegates Lawrence T. Morgon, David Tom, Lena Manheimer, and George Arthur in misusing over $186,000.
  - On March 11, 2014, Naize pleaded not guilty to misusing $35,550 and diverting the funds to members of his family. On April 4, 2014, Naize was removed from the speakership through forced paid leave via a unanimous vote. On April 7, 2014, Naize filed a petition with the Navajo court to restrain the Council from taking action. Speaker Pro Tem LoRenzo Bates took over the duties of the speakership. Naize resigned his delegate seat at noon on Sept 29, 2014. Later that year, Speaker Naize changed his plea to guilty, after resigning from his district seat. Many Farms chapter's grazing official and former council candidate Roland Tso was appointed to serve the unexpired term of Naize's delegate seat; Tso was sworn in on November 14, 2014.
  - Delegate David L. Tom resigned in October 2014, late in his term, after pleading guilty to the charge of conspiracy to commit bribery. Prosecutors alleged that Tom had funneled $95,000 in tribal funds to his wife and children. Tom was replaced by former interim Navajo President Leonard Hoskie, who was sworn in on December 1, 2014.
- Navajo code crisis
  - On October 24, the Council passed legislation to amend the Navajo Nation Code. In an 11–10–3 vote, the legislation dissolved the language requirement of the qualifications sections for president. The legislation would have retroactively allowed for Chris Deschene's participation. On October 29, President Shelly vetoed the bill.
  - On January 1, 2015, the Council met to hear a bill that would provide for holding primary elections in June 2015 and general elections in August 2015. The legislation passed the chamber in a controversial 11–1 vote, with over half of the members absent from the vote. On January 5, President Shelly vetoed the bill.
  - January 7, five assistant attorneys general filed petition with the Navajo Nation Supreme Court for clarification on the question of the presidential vacancy issue. Through a controversial agreement and resolution, referenced as CD-80-14 and CD-81-14, the court and the council—with Speaker Pro Tem LoRenzo Bates; delegate Leonard Tsosie; Otto Tso, councilman-elect; and Amber K. Crotty, director Diné Policy Institute as signatories—appointed Ben Shelly to act as interim president. The move was in contradiction to Navajo Code Section 1006.

Council Delegate Kenneth Maryboy informing his supporters of Peter Macdonald's endorsement (2010)

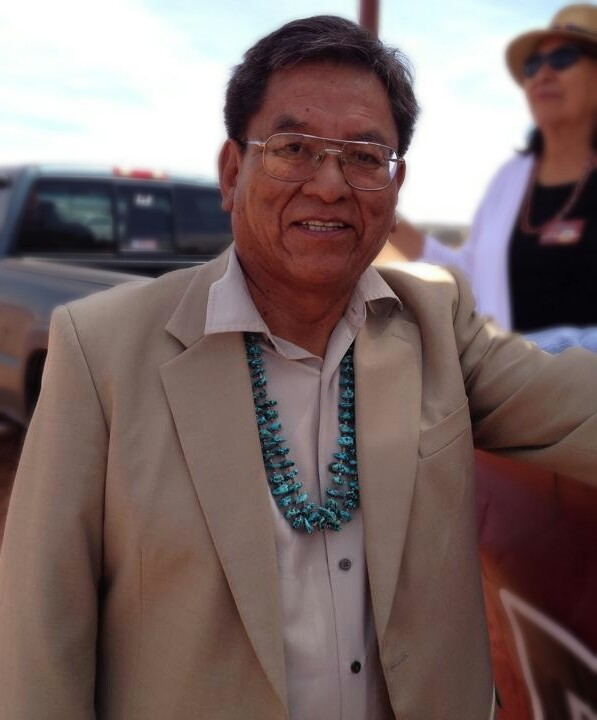
Russell Begaye, Council Delegate & President.

Delegate	Chapter(s)
George Apachito	Alamo, Ramah, Tohajiilee
LoRenzo Bates	T'iistoh Sikaad, Nenahnezad, Upper Fruitland, Tse' Daa' Kaan, Newcomb, San Juan
Elmer P. Begay	Dilcon, Indian Wells, Teesto, Whitecone, Greasewood Springs
Mel R. Begay	Coyote Canyon, Mexican Springs, Naschitti, Tohatchi, Bahastl'a'a'
Nelson S. Begaye	Lukachukai, Round Rock, Tsaile/Wheatfields, Tse Ch'izhi/Rough Rock, Rock Point
Russell Begaye	Shiprock
Katherine Benally	Chilchinbeto, Dennehotso, Kayenta
Joshua Lavar Butler	To' Nanees Dizi
Lorenzo Curley	Klagetoh, Wide Ruins, Houck, Lupton, Nahata Dziil
Charles Damon	Baahaali, Chi Chil Tah, Manuelito, Red Rock, Rock Springs, Tsayatoh
Jonathan Hale	Oaksprings, St. Michaels
Kenneth Maryboy	Mexican Water, To'likan, Teesnospos, Aneth, Red Mesa
Johnny Naize	Tachee/Blue Gap, Many Farms, Nazlini, Tselani/Cottonwood, Low Mountain
Jonathan Nez	Tsah Bii Kin, Navajo Mountain, Shonto, Oljato
Leonard Pete	Chinle
Walter Phelps	Cameron, Coalmine Canyon, Birdsprings, Leupp, Tolani Lake
Alton Joe Shepherd	Jeddito, Cornfields, Ganado, Kinlichee, Steamboat
Danny Simpson	Becenti, Lake Valley, Nahodishgish, Standing Rock, Whiterock, Huerfano, Nageezi, Crownpoint
Roscoe D. Smith	Crystal, Fort Defiance, Red Lake, Sawmill
David L. Tom	Cove, Toadlena/Two Grey Hills, Red Valley Tse'alnaozt'i'i', Sheepsprings, Beclabito, Gadiiahi/To'Koi
Duane S. Tsinigine	Coppermine, K'aii'to, LeChee, Tonalea/Red Lake, Bodaway/Gap
Leonard Tsosie	Littlewater, Pueblo Pintado, Torreon, Whitehorse Lake, Baca/Brewitt, Casamero Lake, Ojo Encino, Counselor
Dwight Witherspoon	Hard Rock, Forest Lake, Pinon, Black Mesa, Whippoorwill
Edmund Yazzie	Churchrock, Iyanbito, Mariano Lake, Pinedale, Smith Lake, Thoreau

== 23rd council (2015–2018) ==
The newly elected 23rd Navajo Nation Council was inaugurated on January 13, 2015, in Window Rock, Arizona. Following the inauguration, delegates convened in special session to select a speaker pro tem to serve in that capacity until a speaker was selected by the council to serve a two-year term. Council delegate Kee Allen Begay, Jr. (Low Mountain, Many Farms, Nazlini, Tachee/Blue Gap, Tselani/Cottonwood) was elected speaker pro tem by a coin toss after he and former Speaker Pro Tem LoRenzo Bates each received 12 votes. Begay served as speaker pro tem until the start of the winter session on January 26, 2015, after which former Speaker Pro Tem LoRenzo Bates won the speakership, after a runoff election with Alton Joe Shepherd (Jeddito, Cornfields, Ganado, Kinlichee, Steamboat) where each received 12 votes, after which Shepard withdrew his candidacy, "for the council to unite and work together".

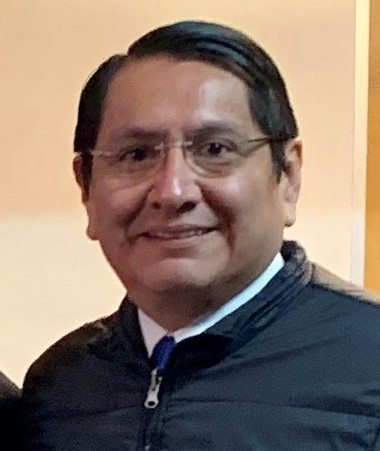
Jonathan Nez, Council Delegate, Vice-President, & President.

Delegate	Chapter(s)
LoRenzo Bates	T'iistoh Sikaad, Nenahnezad, Upper Fruitland, Tse' Daa' Kaan, Newcomb, San Juan
Kee Allen Begay, Jr.	Tachee/Blue Gap, Many Farms, Nazlini, Tselani/Cottonwood, Low Mountain
Mel Begay	Coyote Canyon, Mexican Springs, Naschitti, Tohatchi, Bahastl'a'a'
Norman M. Begay	Alamo, Ramah, Tohajiilee
Nelson S. BeGaye	Lukachukai, Round Rock, Tsaile/Wheatfields, Tse Ch'izhi/Rough Rock, Rock Point
Benjamin L. Bennett	Crystal, Fort Defiance, Red Lake, Sawmill
Nathaniel Brown	Chilchinbeto, Dennehotso, Kayenta
Tom Chee	Shiprock
Amber Kanazbah Crotty	Cove, Toadlena/Two Grey Hills, Red Valley Tse'alnaozt'i'i', Sheepsprings, Beclabito, Gadiiahi/To'Koi
Seth Damon	Baahaali, Chi Chil Tah, Manuelito, Red Rock, Rock Springs, Tsayatoh
Davis Filfred	Mexican Water, To'likan, Teesnospos, Aneth, Red Mesa
Jonathan Hale	Oaksprings, St. Michaels
Lee Jack, Sr.	Dilcon, Indian Wells, Teesto, Whitecone, Greasewood Springs
Jonathan Nez	Tsah Bii Kin, Navajo Mountain, Shonto, Oljato
Jonathan Perry	Becenti, Lake Valley, Nahodishgish, Standing Rock, Whiterock, Huerfano, Nageezi, Crownpoint
Leonard H. Pete	Chinle
Walter Phelps	Cameron, Coalmine Canyon, Birdsprings, Leupp, Tolani Lake
Alton Joe Shepherd	Jeddito, Cornfields, Ganado, Kinlichee, Steamboat
Tuchoney Slim, Jr.	Coppermine, K'aii'to, LeChee, Tonalea/Red Lake, Bodaway/Gap
Raymond Smith, Jr.	Klagetoh, Wide Ruins, Houck, Lupton, Nahata Dziil
Leonard Tsosie	Littlewater, Pueblo Pintado, Torreon, Whitehorse Lake, Baca/Brewitt, Casamero Lake, Ojo Encino, Counselor
Otto Tso	To' Nanees Dizi
Dwight Witherspoon	Hard Rock, Forest Lake, Pinon, Black Mesa, Whippoorwill
Edmund Yazzie	Churchrock, Iyanbito, Mariano Lake, Pinedale, Smith Lake, Thoreau

== 24th council (2019–2023) ==
On January 15, 2019, the 24th Navajo Nation Council took their oath of office at noon during the 2019 Navajo Nation Inauguration at the Bee Holdzil Fighting Scouts Events Center in Fort Defiance, Arizona. Following the inaugural event, the 24-member council convened for a special session to consider Legislation No. 0001-19 to select a speaker pro tem. Through a simple majority vote by Council members, Council Delegate Seth Damon (Bááháálí, Chichiltah, Manuelito, Tsé Lichíí’, Rock Springs, Tsayatoh) was selected as speaker pro tem. On January 28, 2019, opening day of the 2019 Winter Council Session Speaker Pro Tem Seth Damon was voted in as Speaker of the 24th Navajo Nation Council.

In July 2019, Delegate Nelson BeGaye resigned for health reasons. Following a special election, Carl Roessel Slater was elected to the seat. Legislation No. 0219-22 was introduced to select a new Speaker of the 24th Navajo Nation Council until the new 25th council due to former Speaker Damon resigning from the position. On November 16, 2022 Honorable Otto Tso (Tuba City) was sworn in as Speaker of the Navajo Nation Council until January 10, 2023.

Delegate	Chapter(s)
Elmer Begay	Dilcon, Indian Wells, Teesto, Whitecone, Greasewood Springs
Kee Allen Begay, Jr.	Tachee/Blue Gap, Many Farms, Nazlini, Tselani/Cottonwood, Low Mountain
Paul Begay	Coppermine, K'aii'to, LeChee, Tonalea/Red Lake, Bodaway/Gap
Nathaniel Brown	Chilchinbeto, Dennehotso, Kayenta
Eugenia Charles-Newton	Shiprock
Amber Kanazbah Crotty	Cove, Toadlena/Two Grey Hills, Red Valley Tse'alnaozt'i'i', Sheepsprings, Beclabito, Gadiiahi/To'Koi
Seth Damon	Baahaali, Chi Chil Tah, Manuelito, Red Rock, Rock Springs, Tsayatoh
Herman Daniels, Jr.	Tsah Bii Kin, Navajo Mountain, Shonto, Oljato
Mark Freeland	Becenti, Lake Valley, Nahodishgish, Standing Rock, Whiterock, Huerfano, Nageezi, Crownpoint
Pernell Halona	Coyote Canyon, Mexican Springs, Naschitti, Tohatchi, Bahastl'a'a'
Jamie Henio	Alamo, Ramah, Tohajiilee
Vince R. James	Jeddito, Cornfields, Ganado, Kinlichee, Steamboat
Rickie Nez	T'iistoh Sikaad, Nenahnezad, Upper Fruitland, Tse' Daa' Kaan, Newcomb, San Juan
Carl Slater	Lukachukai, Round Rock, Tsaile/Wheatfields, Tse Ch'izhi/Rough Rock, Rock Point
Raymond Smith, Jr.	Klagetoh, Wide Ruins, Houck, Lupton, Nahata Dziil
Wilson Stewart, Jr.	Crystal, Fort Defiance, Red Lake, Sawmill
Charlaine Tso	Mexican Water, To'likan, Teesnospos, Aneth, Red Mesa
Daniel Tso	Littlewater, Pueblo Pintado, Torreon, Whitehorse Lake, Baca/Brewitt, Casamero Lake, Ojo Encino, Counselor
Eugene Tso	Chinle
Otto Tso	To' Nanees Dizi
Thomas Walker, Jr.	Cameron, Coalmine Canyon, Birdsprings, Leupp, Tolani Lake
Edison Wauneka	Oaksprings, St. Michaels
Edmund Yazzie	Churchrock, Iyanbito, Mariano Lake, Pinedale, Smith Lake, Thoreau
Jimmy Yellowhair	Hard Rock, Forest Lake, Pinon, Black Mesa, Whippoorwill

== 25th council (since 2023) ==
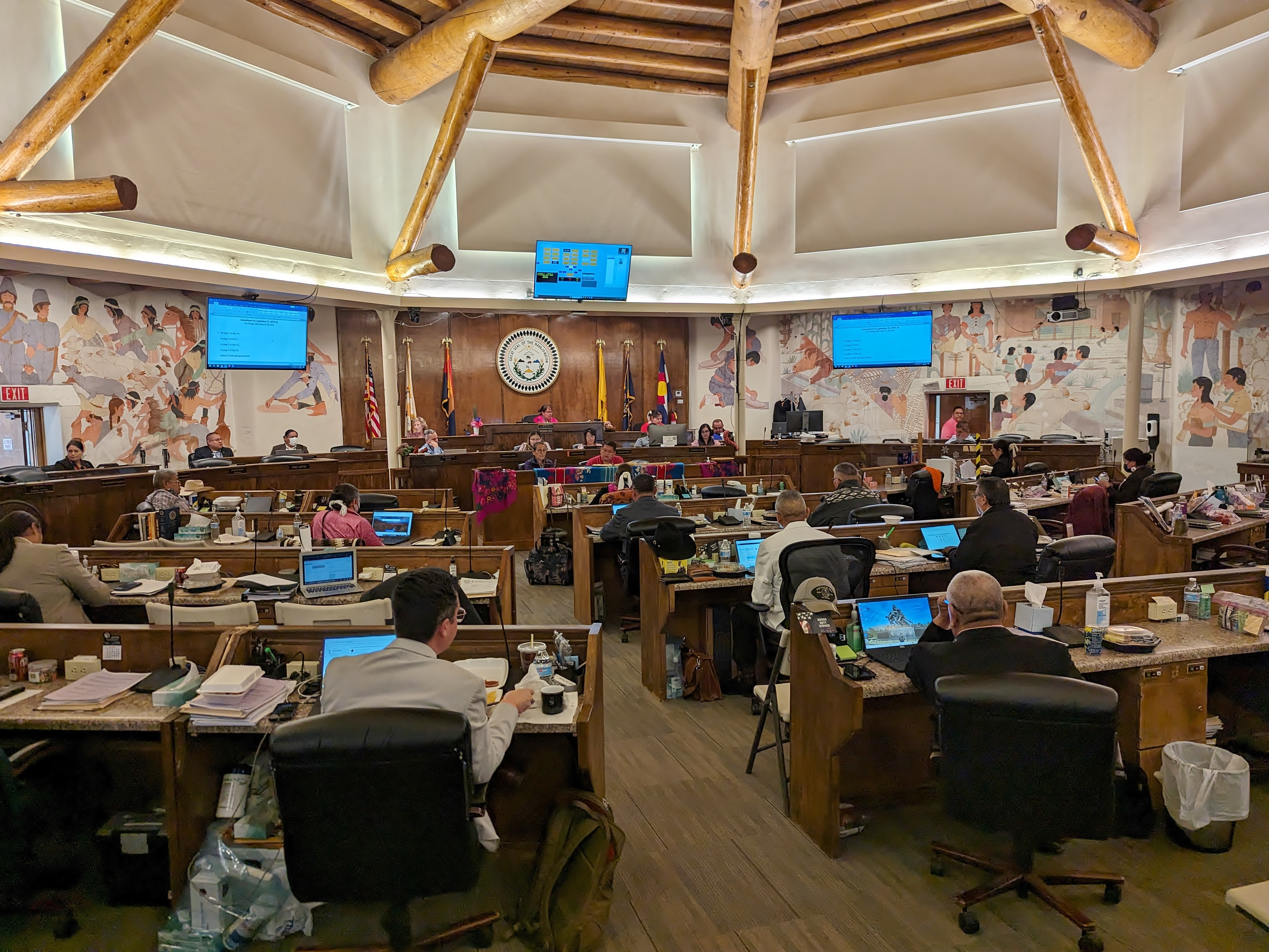
During an April 2024 session

On January 10, 2023, the 25th Navajo Nation Council took their oath of office during the 2023 Navajo Nation Inauguration at the Bee Holdzil Fighting Scouts Events Center in Fort Defiance, Arizona. Following the inaugural event, the 24-member council held a special session to select a speaker pro-tem. Crystalyne Curley was elected as the Navajo Nation Council's first Female speaker in 2023 and was re-elected for another 2-year term in 2025.

The 25th Navajo Nation Council has the youngest member to be part of the council since its formation, 28 year old Shaandiin Parrish, who is also a former Miss Navajo (2019-2021). This council has a 66% (16/24) of freshmen whom have never been elected under previous councils. 33% (8/24) retained their seats in council. The council has a 37.5% (9/24) representation of females, which has not been that high in previous councils.

Delegate	Chapter(s)
Steven Arviso 2023-2026 Titus J. Nez 2026- current	Churchrock, Iyanbito, Mariano Lake, Pinedale, Smith Lake, Thoreau
Lomardo Aseret	Klagetoh, Wide Ruins, Houck, Lupton, Nahata Dziil
Helena Nez Begay	Coppermine, K'aii'to, LeChee, Tonalea/Red Lake, Bodaway/Gap
Norman M. Begay	Alamo, Ramah, Tohajiilee
Eugenia Charles-Newton	Shiprock
Shawna Ann Claw	Chinle
Amber Kanazbah Crotty	Cove, Toadlena/Two Grey Hills, Red Valley Tse'alnaozt'i'i', Sheepsprings, Beclabito, Gadiiahi/To'Koi
Crystalyne Curley	Tachee/Blue Gap, Many Farms, Nazlini, Tselani/Cottonwood, Low Mountain
Seth Damon	Baahaali, Chi Chil Tah, Manuelito, Red Rock, Rock Springs, Tsayatoh
Herman M. Daniels	Tsah Bii Kin, Navajo Mountain, Shonto, Oljato
Vince James	Jeddito, Cornfields, Ganado, Kinlichee, Steamboat
Brenda Jesus	Oaksprings, St. Michaels
Casey Allen Johnson	Cameron, Coalmine Canyon, Birdsprings, Leupp, Tolani Lake
Andy Nez	Crystal, Fort Defiance, Red Lake, Sawmill
Rickie Nez	T'iistoh Sikaad, Nenahnezad, Upper Fruitland, Tse' Daa' Kaan, Newcomb, San Juan
Nathan Notah	Coyote Canyon, Mexican Springs, Naschitti, Tohatchi, Bahastl'a'a'
Shaandiin Parrish	Chilchinbeto, Dennehotso, Kayenta
Germaine Simonson	Hard Rock, Forest Lake, Pinon, Black Mesa, Whippoorwill
Danny Simpson	Becenti, Lake Valley, Nahodishgish, Standing Rock, Whiterock, Huerfano, Nageezi, Crownpoint
Carl R. Slater	Lukachukai, Round Rock, Tsaile/Wheatfields, Tse Ch'izhi/Rough Rock, Rock Point
George Tolth	Littlewater, Pueblo Pintado, Torreon, Whitehorse Lake, Baca/Brewitt, Casamero Lake, Ojo Encino, Counselor
Otto Tso	To' Nanees Dizi
Curtis Yanito	Mexican Water, To'likan, Teesnospos, Aneth, Red Mesa
Cherilyn Yazzie	Dilcon, Indian Wells, Teesto, Whitecone, Greasewood Springs

== Speakers of the Navajo Nation Council ==
Name	Chapter	Took office	Left office
Nelson Gorman Jr.	Chinle	1995	1997
Kelsey A. Begaye	Kaibito	1997	1999
Edward T. Begay	Church Rock	1999	2003
Lawrence T. Morgan	Pinedale	2003	2011
Johnny Naize		2011	September 2014 (Note: resigned)
LoRenzo Bates	Burnham	2014	2015
Kee Allen Begay Jr.		January 15, 2015	January 26, 2015
Lorenzo Bates	Burnham	January 26, 2015	January 28, 2019
Seth Damon		January 28, 2019	November 4, 2022
Otto Tso	Tuba City	November 4, 2022	January 23, 2023
Crystalyne Curley		January 23, 2023	Incumbent

== Notable delegates ==
- Annie Dodge Wauneka (Klagetoh, Wide Ruins)
- Rex Lee Jim (Rock Point) 8th Vice President of the Navajo Nation.
- Thomas Dodge 3rd Chairman of the Navajo Tribal Council.
- Kenneth Maryboy (Aneth/Red Mesa/Mexican Water/Sweet Water/ TeecNosPos)
- Davis Filfred (Aneth/Red Mesa/Mexican Water)
- Mark Maryboy (Aneth/Red Mesa/Mexican Water)
- Russell Begay (Shiprock) - 8th Navajo Nation President.
- Jonathan Nez (Ts'ah Bii Kin, Navajo Mountain, Shonto, & Oljato) – 9th Navajo Nation Vice-President & 9th Navajo Nation President.
- Crystalyne Curley (Tachee/Blue Gap, Many Farms, Nazlini, Tselani/Cottonwood, Low Mountain) - First Woman to be elected Speaker of the Navajo Nation Council.
- Sam Ahkeah 7th Chairman of the Navajo Nation Tribal Council

== See also ==
- Tribal sovereignty in the United States
- President of the Navajo Nation
- Vice-President of the Navajo Nation
- Speaker of the Navajo Nation Council
- Navajo Nation
