= Eugenia Charles-Newton =

Member of the Navajo Nation Council for the Shiprock district
- Incumbent
- Assumed office January 15, 2019
- Preceded by: Tom Chee

Personal details
- Born: Eugenia Charles Shiprock, New Mexico, U.S.
- Citizenship: Navajo Nation; United States
- Education: Arizona State University; University of Kansas; University of Arizona

Eugenia Charles-Newton is a Diné politician and lawyer serving on the Navajo Nation Council for the Shiprock district since 2019. She is the first woman to represent the district.

== Early life and education ==
Charles-Newton was born and raised in Shiprock, New Mexico, as one of twelve children. She is Bit’ahnii, born for ‘Áshįįhi, and has additional clan affiliations with T ł ’ááshchí’í and Tábąąhá. Growing up, her family lived without electricity or water, relying on the land and ranching for their livelihood. Charles-Newton spent much of her childhood caring for animals on her family's ranch, often riding her family's donkey.

She earned a bachelor's degree in political science and English literature from Arizona State University in 2005. She went on to complete a law degree from the University of Kansas School of Law in 2008 and a master's degree from the University of Arizona in 2009. Charles-Newton was admitted to the Navajo Nation Bar Association in 2017.

== Career ==
Charles-Newton was a prosecutor, law librarian, and professor, publishing several scholarly papers during her academic and legal career.

In the 2018 Navajo Nation Council election, Charles-Newton succeeded outgoing delegate Tom Chee to represent Shiprock. She defeated Vernon Roy Lee with 1,588 votes to 822 to become the first woman to represent the district. This election marked a shift in the Navajo political landscape, reflecting a national trend of increased female political leadership. She became one of three women serving on the 24th Navajo Nation Council, alongside Amber Kanazbah Crotty and Charlaine Tso. Together, these three women represented the Northern Agency, a region encompassing several communities within the Navajo Nation. During her campaign, Charles-Newton was supported by advocates like Graham Biyáál, who highlighted the importance of balanced representation on the council.

Her legislative priorities have included transparency, public communication, and increasing citizen participation in Navajo governance. As chair of the Law and Order Committee, Charles-Newton has focused on public safety, advocating for infrastructure projects to improve law enforcement services. During the COVID-19 pandemic in the Navajo Nation, she played a key role in securing hardship assistance payments for Navajo citizens, a move that faced significant opposition within the council. In 2022, she described this as one of the toughest political challenges she had faced.

In 2022, Charles-Newton announced her re-election campaign for the Shiprock and Nataani Nez delegate seat and expressed her intention to run for Speaker of the Navajo Nation Council, which would have made her first woman to hold that position if elected. She was nominated for the position of speaker by the incumbent speaker Seth Damon but was unsuccessful in securing the position. Damon resigned from his role as speaker near the end of his term after personal issues surfaced on social media. Charles-Newton introduced legislation in April 2023 to remove Crystalyne Curley from her position as speaker, three months into her term. The legislation claimed that Curley had not met the expectations of the council, citing issues with communication from her office, a lack of clarity on her stance on staff conduct, and failure to address safety concerns related to sexual harassment allegations. Despite the legislation, Curley continued to serve as speaker and played a significant role in water rights discussions related to the Little Colorado River.

== Personal life ==
As of 2022, Charles-Newton lives in Shiprock, with her husband, Leroy Newton, where they maintain a farm. They have a rescue donkey.

== See also ==
- Native American women in politics
