= Shaandiin Parrish =

American member of the Navajo Nation Council (born c.1994))

Member of the Navajo Nation Council for the 8th District
- Incumbent
- Assumed office January 2023
- Preceded by: Nathaniel Brown

Personal details
- Born: 1993 or 1994 (age 32–33)
- Citizenship: Navajo Nation; United States
- Education: Arizona State University

Shaandiin Parrish (born c. 1994) is an American politician and former Miss Navajo Nation serving as a member of the Navajo Nation Council since 2023. She represents the communities of Chilchinbito, Dennehotso, and Kayenta. Upon her election in 2022, she became the youngest member of the council and was part of a historic vote that saw a record number of women join the legislative body.

As Miss Navajo Nation from 2019 to 2021, Parrish was the first titleholder in history to serve for two consecutive years, a result of the COVID-19 pandemic forcing the cancellation of the 2020 pageant. During her extended reign, she worked on the front lines to distribute supplies to communities impacted by the pandemic.

== Early life and education ==
Parrish was born c. 1994 is from Kayenta, Arizona. She has one biological brother and one sister. She is Kinyaa'áanii and born for Kinyaa'áanii, with her maternal grandfather being Tódích'íi'nii and her paternal grandfather being Tábąąhá.

Parrish is a graduate of Arizona State University (ASU). She initially studied elementary education in college. In 2018, she graduated with a bachelor's degree in political science, which she earned on a Gates Millennium Scholarship. She earned a master's degree in business management from ASU.

== Career ==
Beginning in 2015, Parrish interned for three years at the Arizona Senate. She later worked as the public information officer for Arizona State Treasurer, Kimberly Yee and as a legislative district assistant for former Navajo Nation Council delegate Jonathan Hale.

=== Miss Navajo Nation ===
Parrish held the title of Miss Indian Arizona. In September 2019, she was crowned Miss Navajo Nation, an outcome she did not expect. Her role changed significantly after the Navajo Nation declared the COVID-19 pandemic a public health crisis. Parrish worked on the front lines with Navajo president Jonathan Nez and other leaders to distribute food, water, and hand sanitizer to communities impacted by shutdowns, including visiting parts of the Navajo Nation without running water. In June 2020, she directed traffic at a large distribution event in Ganado, Arizona. To protect her family from potential virus exposure through her work, she chose to self-isolate from them in 2020.

When the pandemic forced the cancellation of the 2020 Navajo Nation Fair, the pageant could not be held. As a result, Parrish remained Miss Navajo Nation for a second year, becoming the first titleholder in history to serve two consecutive years. During her extended reign, she donated the 2016 Miss Navajo Nation crown to the Navajo Nation Museum for cultural preservation.

Parrish passed on the title in September 2021 to Niagara Rockbridge. After her reign, Parrish worked as a staff assistant in the administration of president Nez and vice president Myron Lizer.

=== Navajo Nation Council ===
In May 2022, Parrish announced her candidacy for the Navajo Nation Council. In the general election on November 8, 2022, Parrish, then 28, defeated incumbent Nathaniel Brown with 1,271 votes to 1,147. Upon taking office, she became the youngest member of the 25th Navajo Nation Council and was part of a historic election that saw a record nine women join the legislative body. She represents the communities of Chilchinbito, Dennehotso, and Kayenta. As a delegate, her stated policy priorities include road improvements, dam restorations, economic development, and the reclamation of the Black Mesa area from the Peabody Coal Mine.

In May 2025, Parrish was selected to participate in the 17th cohort of the Flinn-Brown Fellowship, a program of the Arizona Center for Civic Leadership. The fellowship includes participation in the Flinn-Brown Academy, a 12-session public policy institute.

== See also ==
- Native American women in politics
