= Speaker of the Navajo Nation Council =

- Great Seal of the Navajo Nation

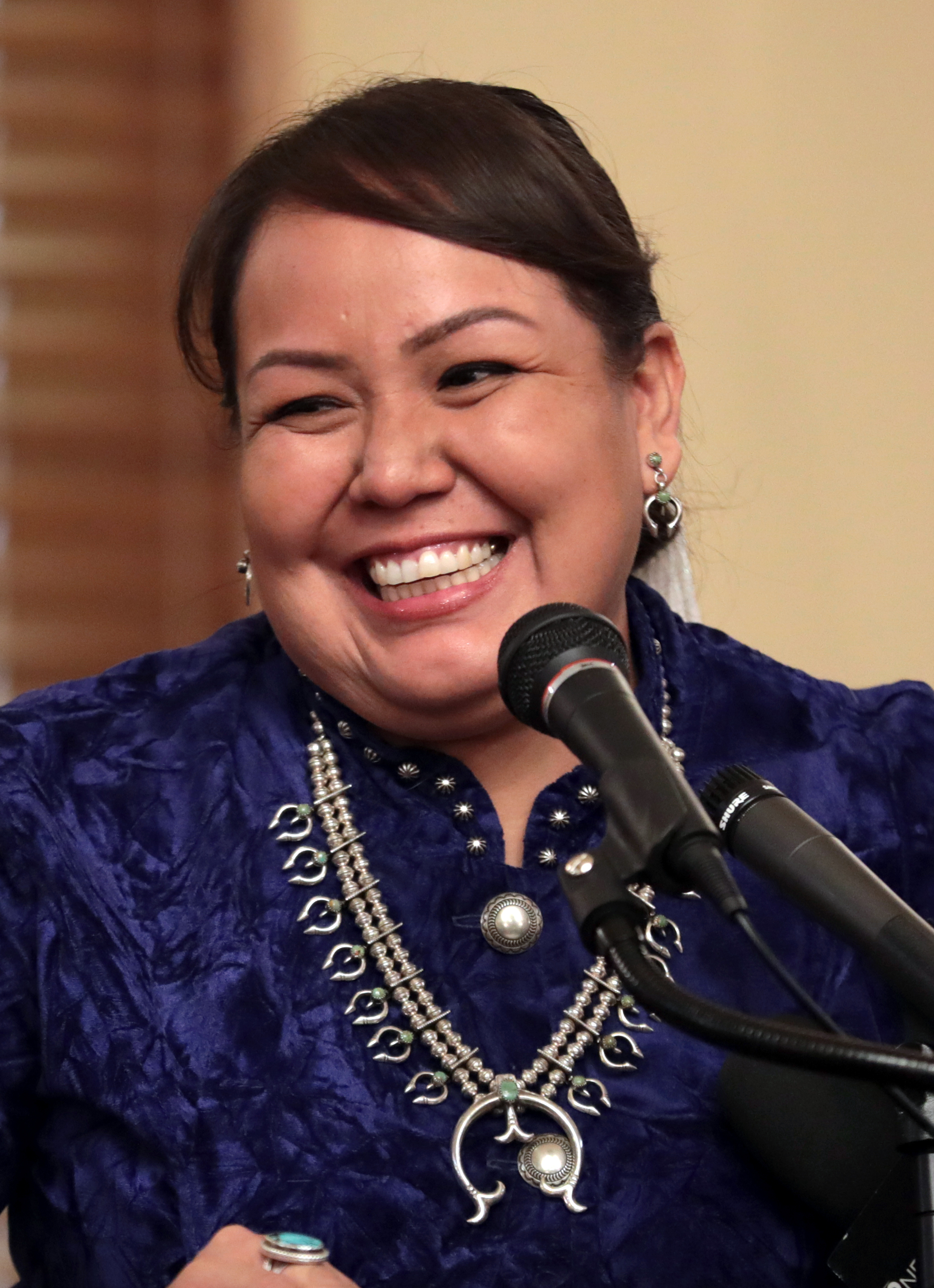
- Incumbent; Crystalyne Curley since January 23, 2023
- Style: Madam Speaker (informal); Honorable Speaker (formal)
- Status: Presiding Member of the Navajo Nation Council
- Residence: Window Rock, AZ
- Seat: Navajo Nation Council Chamber
- Appointer: The Navajo Nation Council
- Term length: Two years
- Constituting instrument: Navajo Nation Code & Treaty of 1868
- Inaugural holder: Chee Dodge
- Salary: ~$55,000.00 USD per year
- Website: https://www.navajonationcouncil.org/speaker-otto-tso-biography/

The office of the speaker of the Navajo Nation Council was created in 1991 following restructuring of the Navajo Nation government. The speaker is the head of the legislative branch and presides over sessions of the council. The speaker of the council serve a term of two years during the administration of the incumbent president. The office of the speaker is located in Window Rock, Arizona, at the Council Chambers.

== Officeholders ==
No.	Speaker	Took office	Left office	Tenure	Party
1	Nelson Gorman Jr. (born TBA) (Chinle)	1995	1997	2 years	Unknown
2	Kelsey Begaye (1951–2021) (Kaibito)	1997	1999 (Note: Begaye was elected President of the Navajo Nation.)	2 years	Democratic
3	Edward T. Begay (1935–2022) (Church Rock)	January 1, 1999	January 1, 2003	4 years, 0 days	Unknown
4	Lawrence T. Morgan (born TBA) (Pinedale)	January 1, 2003	January 1, 2011	8 years, 0 days	Unknown
5	Johnny Naize (born TBA) (Tselani/Cottonwood)	January 2011	September 2014 (Note: Resigned from office.)	3 years, 8 months	Unknown
6	Lorenzo Bates (born TBA) (Burnham); 1st time	September 2014	January 15, 2015	4 months	Unknown
7	Kee Allen Begay Jr. (born TBA) (TBA)	January 15, 2015	January 26, 2015	11 days	Unknown
8	Lorenzo Bates (born TBA) (Burnham); 2nd time	January 26, 2015	January 28, 2019	4 years, 2 days	Unknown
9	Seth Damon (born TBA) (TBA)	January 28, 2019	November 4, 2022	3 years, 280 days	Unknown
10	Otto Tso (born TBA) (Tuba City)	November 16, 2022	January 10, 2023	55 days	Unknown
11	Crystalyne Curley (born 1985) (TBA)	January 23, 2023	Incumbent (Note: Curley is currently running for President of the Navajo Nation. Her tenure is expected to expire in January 2027.)	3 years, 228 days	Unknown

== See also ==
- President of the Navajo Nation
- Vice President of the Navajo Nation
- Navajo Nation Council
