= Germaine Simonson =

Member of the Navajo Nation Council
- Incumbent
- Assumed office January 2023

Personal details
- Children: 3

Germaine Simonson is an American and Navajo entrepreneur and politician serving as a member of the Navajo Nation Council since 2023. She is the owner of several businesses, including the Rocky Ridge Gas + Market in Hard Rock, Arizona, which provides fresh produce in the remote community. She advocates for support for Navajo-owned small businesses and for solutions to rural infrastructure challenges, particularly water access.

== Early life and education ==
Simonson's hometown is Hard Rock, Arizona. She grew up on tribal land in the Rocky Ridge area before leaving to attend high school and college, after which she returned to the community.

Simonson is a member of the Navajo Nation. Her maternal clan is Chishí (Chishí), and her paternal clan is Třízhí lání (Třízhí lání). Her maternal grandfather's clan is Tsé deeshgiizhnii (Tsé deeshgiizhnii), and her paternal grandfather's clan is Dziłt'aadi/Kiyaa'aanii (Dziłt'aadi/Kiyaa'aanii).

== Career ==
Simonson operates three businesses, a sole-proprietorship consulting business, a nonemergency medical transport service named Turquoise Trail Transport, and the Rocky Ridge Gas + Market.

The market is located in a remote area of the Navajo Nation on the site of one of the reservation's earliest trading posts. The store lacks a formal street address, is situated down a dirt road, and includes a hitching post for customers who arrive on horseback. Simonson uses the store to address food access issues by selling fresh produce, though she faces significant supply-chain challenges due to its remote location. She often must drive two hours to Flagstaff, Arizona or meet suppliers 50 miles away to stock the market.

In late 2019, Simonson started an online delivery service called "Grandma Baskets" for residents on the reservation. During the COVID-19 pandemic, her businesses were impacted, and she secured three Paycheck Protection Program (PPP) loans totaling $21,500 from the Rural Community Assistance Corporation (RCAC) to maintain her payroll.

In 2021, her store was selected as the pilot site for a Watergen generator, a machine donated by the Israeli company that creates clean drinking water from moisture in the air. The local advocacy organization Tó Nizhóní Ání agreed to pay for the generator's first year of electricity costs. Simonson later reported to the company that the pilot machine was leaking, making it difficult to assess its total water production.

=== Navajo Nation Council ===
In January 2023, Simonson began her term as a delegate for the 25th Navajo Nation Council. She was part of a historic council that included a record nine female delegates. She represents the chapters of Hard Rock, Forest Lake, Pinon, Black Mesa, and Whippoorwill. Simonson serves on the Health, Education & Human Services Committee.

A primary goal of her political role is to support Navajo-owned small businesses and review regulations that may hinder entrepreneurs. Drawing from her own experience, she has highlighted to policymakers that many Navajo business owners struggle to access relief programs because they lack access to bookkeepers and accountants. She advocates for government policies and rules to be treated as living documents that can be updated to meet current needs.

Simonson is a vocal advocate for infrastructure improvements on the Navajo Nation, particularly for water access. She has noted that she personally lives without running water and that her access was cut off during the COVID-19 pandemic when her local chapter shut down.

== Personal life ==
As of October 2020, Simonson is married and has three children.

== See also ==
- Native American women in politics
