= Amber Kanazbah Crotty =

Navajo politician (born c.1978)

Member of the Navajo Nation Council for the 12th District
- Incumbent
- Assumed office January 13, 2015

Personal details
- Born: 1977 or 1978 (age 47–48)
- Citizenship: Navajo Nation; United States
- Education: University of California, Los Angeles

Amber Kanazbah Crotty (born c. 1978) is an American and Navajo politician and advocate. A member of the Navajo Nation Council since 2015, she was the only female delegate on the 23-member council when she first took office. Her work has largely focused on advocating for victims of sexual assault and their families.

Crotty's advocacy was influenced by her own experiences with sexual harassment and assault. She was instrumental in establishing an Amber Alert system on the Navajo reservation following the abduction and murder of Ashlynne Mike. She has also chaired the Naabik'íyáti' Committee Sexual Assault Prevention sub-committee and the Missing and Murdered Diné Relatives (MMDR) Task Force. For her work, she was named the 2017 Person of the Year by the Navajo Times and has received awards from the Southwest Indigenous Women's Coalition and the Navajo Nation Office of the Prosecutor.

== Early life and education ==
Crotty was born c. 1978 and is from Sheep Springs, New Mexico. Her middle name, Kanazbah, means "warrior." As a child, she was a Girl Scout and later a troop leader. Crotty earned a bachelor's and a master's degree from the University of California, Los Angeles. Her master's thesis focused on the topic of Navajo blood quantum.

== Career and advocacy ==
=== Early career and election ===
Before holding elected office, Crotty worked as a policy analyst for the Navajo Nation Council, focusing on issues such as capital improvement and water rights. She also worked with the Dine Policy Institute at Diné College, where she researched government reform, brain drain, and intellectual property law.

In November 2014, Crotty, then a political newcomer, was elected to the 23rd Navajo Nation Council, defeating incumbent Larry Duncan by 183 votes. She took office on January 13, 2015, becoming the only female delegate on the 23-member council. She was the second woman to be elected after the council was reduced from 88 to 24 delegates in 2009. Crotty's represented chapters include Beclabito, Gadiiahi/To'Koi, Red Valley, Sheep Springs, Toadlena/Two Grey Hills, Cove, and Tsé'ałnáoozt'i'í. By September 2018, she had launched her campaign for a second term and was later a member of the 24th Navajo Nation Council.

=== Advocacy ===
A central focus of Crotty's career has been advocating for victims of sexual assault and their families. On July 20, 2016, she publicly addressed the Navajo Nation Council, stating that she had been sexually harassed as an elected official. During the same address, she disclosed that she had been physically groped by a delegate years earlier while working as a legislative district assistant. As she spoke, her microphone was turned off, but she continued her testimony by speaking more loudly.

Crotty has stated that the 2016 abduction and murder of Ashlynne Mike triggered her own memories of childhood abuse and trauma from sexual assault as an adult, which further influenced her advocacy. In response to the case, Crotty authored legislation and successfully lobbied for federal funding to establish an Amber Alert system on the Navajo reservation. She also co-sponsored legislation with delegate Jonathan Hale to form a sexual assault prevention work group.

For her outspoken advocacy, the Navajo Times named her its 2017 Person of the Year, after she had been included on the publication's shortlist in 2015 and 2016.

Crotty has served as the chair of the Naabik'íyáti' Committee Sexual Assault Prevention sub-committee. She also serves as chair of the Missing and Murdered Diné Relatives (MMDR) Task Force. As head of the task force, she has overseen the development of a proposed data institute and a community action toolkit for missing persons cases. In addition to her work on sexual assault, she has advocated for the elderly in vulnerable communities and has focused on youth development, contributing to the creation of the Navajo Nation Advisory Youth Council.

In 2022, the Southwest Indigenous Women's Coalition (SWIWC) honored her with the Eleanor E. Roehrig Advocate Award for her work with survivors. On September 17, 2024, she received the Vanguard of Justice Award from the Navajo Nation Office of the Prosecutor for her leadership of the MMDR Task Force.

== See also ==
- Native American women in politics
