= Lawrence T. Morgan =

Navajo leader

4th Speaker of the Navajo Nation Council
- In office January 1, 2003 – January 1, 2011
- President: Joe Shirley Jr
- Preceded by: Edward T. Begay
- Succeeded by: Johnny Naize

Personal details
- Born: Pinedale, New Mexico
- Occupation: Government

Lawrence T. Morgan is the former Speaker of the Navajo Nation Tribal Council.

He was first elected in January 2003 by then the 20th Navajo Nation Council. Current Navajo law requires a speaker to serve two years per term. He was re-elected in 2005 to a second term, and in January 2007 he was elected to a third consecutive term, defeating fellow councilman Harold Wauneka of Fort Defiance, Arizona. In January 2009 he was once again re-elected to lead the Navajo Nation Council, after beating fellow council member Leonard Tsosie (Whitehorse Lake/Torreon/Counselor).

== Life and family ==
Lawrence Tom Morgan was born and raised in Pinedale, New Mexico, within five miles (8 km) of two uranium mines. New Mexico had been a significant uranium producer since the discovery of uranium by Navajo sheepherder Paddy Martinez in 1950. Uranium in New Mexico is almost all in the Grants mineral belt, along the south margin of the San Juan Basin in McKinley and Cibola counties, in the northwest part of the state. Stretching northwest to southeast, the mineral belt contains the Chuska, Gallup, Ambrosia Lake, and Laguna uranium mining districts.

Morgan's father spent some time working in the uranium mines, but for him, that was not an option. While his father's work often took him away from home, Morgan's mother took care of the five children.

In addition to working as a silversmith, Morgan sang with his roommate's band in high school. His son and daughter learned to play guitar using the same guitar that his father bought him in the 1960s. Morgan also paints and draws cartoons.

== Education ==
After graduating from Fort Wingate High School in 1972, Morgan spent some time at University of New Mexico in Gallup, New Mexico, studying photography. He later attended Diné College in 1981, where he started taking classes in Navajo government. Morgan did not graduate from higher education, but worked as a rodeo arena announcer.

== Public service ==
It was in the 1980s that Speaker Morgan became interested in serving the public by working in government. He became Chapter Manager of Pinedale Chapter in 1981 and continued to 1983. Morgan served as Secretary–Treasurer of Pinedale Chapter from 1983 to 1987. He then served as Chapter President from 1987 to 1990.

In 1991, Morgan was elected to the Navajo Nation Council and served on the Government Services Committee. In 1995, he started serving as Chairperson of the Transportation and Community Development Committee. He was first selected as Speaker of the Navajo Nation Council by his peers on the Council on January 27, 2003, and reselected for another two-year term on January 24, 2005.

Morgan has represented the Pinedale and Iyanbito chapters for 12 years. He says the reason he gets re-elected is because he listens to the people.

== Controversy ==
Morgan has been involved with several controversial deals, including engagements with Texas billionaire Red McCombs and longhorn cattle. McCombs attempted to use surrogates to acquire 50,000 acres (200 km^{2}) of land surrounding Navajo Canyon on Lake Powell for use by wealthy non-Navajos. The move, according to the Navajo Times, was not popular but fought by local Navajo (Diné) residents. Morgan was asked to discuss his meetings with McCombs by a unanimous LeChee Chapter but never showed for the local meetings.

== Navajo issues ==
Speaker Morgan's legislative priorities include enhancing the local governance certification process and water issues. He also pledges to provide for automation and improved records management, to improve media and public relations, and to provide for adequate office and meeting space for the legislative branch.

Morgan is a proponent of codifying Navajo Nation Fundamental Law, an initiative that began with the former speaker.

== Navajo Nation Council assault ==
In April 2006, Morgan faced a charge of criminal battery when he struck Council Delegate Mark Maryboy.

Morgan struck Maryboy in the chest in the Navajo Chamber's men's bathroom after Maryboy made a complaint to the speaker that he did not help Maryboy bring up legislation that had been skipped over earlier that day. The item—formal condolences to the family of late Council Delegate Curley John of Aneth, whose family was in the gallery—was skipped because Maryboy was out of the council chambers dealing with constituents. Maryboy tried later to put the item back on the agenda but was ruled out of order.

Aneth Chapter members had demanded Morgan issue a public apology, following the bathroom scuffle, during one of Aneth's monthly chapter meetings in Utah. Morgan ignored the Aneth meeting, overall never presenting himself. Investigators attempted to contact Morgan the following days after the incident. Public safety officials said that they believe Morgan stayed off the reservation to avoid possible arrest.
