= Shawna Ann Claw =

Member of the Navajo Nation Council for the Chinle Chapter
- Incumbent
- Assumed office January 10, 2023
- Preceded by: Eugene Tso

Personal details
- Citizenship: Navajo Nation; United States

Shawna Ann Claw is a Diné politician serving as a member of the Navajo Nation Council for the Chinle Chapter since 2023. She was previously the vice president of the chapter.

== Life ==
Claw was born to the Hooghan łaní (Many Hogans Clan) and Tódich’ii’nii (Bitter Water Clan). Her maternal grandfather is from the Táchii’nii (Red Running Into the Water Clan), and her paternal grandfather is from the Kinyaa’áanii (Towering House Clan). Claw's educational background is in business, psychology, and social science.

Claw served as the vice president of the Chinle Chapter. During her time as vice president, she identified many unmet needs in her community, which ultimately motivated her to seek a higher office. Upon Claw's election to the Navajo Nation Council, she became the first woman to represent Chinle in this role. She succeeded Eugene Tso. Her term began on January 10, 2023.

As a council delegate, Claw has been focused on addressing key issues affecting her community. Shawna is a member of the Resources and Development Committee. In 2022, she has expressed particular interest in creating a youth center for the large Chinle community, expanding services for the elderly, including the establishment of hospice centers, and advocating for legislative changes to better meet the needs of her constituents. Claw's victory is part of a broader shift within the Navajo Nation, which has seen an increase in female representation in leadership positions, including the election of nine women to the Navajo Nation Council in 2022.

== See also ==
- Native American women in politics
