= Central Consolidated Schools =

Public school district in New Mexico, United States

Central Consolidated Schools (also known as the Central Consolidated School District) is a public school district based in Shiprock, New Mexico, United States.

The district covers a 2,819-square-mile (7,300 km^{2}) area in western San Juan County.

== Service area ==
In addition to Shiprock, the district also serves the communities of Beclabito, Fruitland, Kirtland, Naschitti, Nenahnezad, Newcomb, Ojo Amarillo, Sanostee, Sheep Springs, Upper Fruitland, and Waterflow, as well as almost all of Crystal.

== Schools ==
=== Kirtland Area ===
- Kirtland Central High School (Grades 9–12)
- Kirtland Middle School (Grades 7–8)
- Kirtland Elementary School (Grades K–6)
- Ojo Amarillo Elementary School (Grades K–6)
- Kirtland Early Childhood Center (Grades PK–K)

=== Newcomb Area ===
- Newcomb High School (Grades 9–12)
- Newcomb Middle School (Grades 6–8)
- Newcomb Elementary School (Grades (K–5)
- Naschitti Elementary School (Grades K–6)

=== Shiprock Area ===
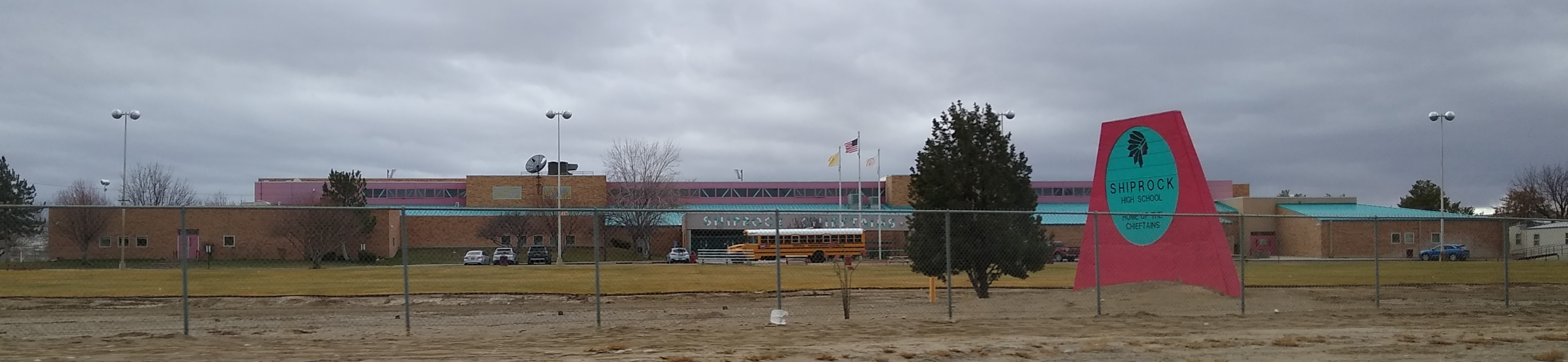
Shiprock High School

- Shiprock High School (Grades 9–12)
- Career Prep Alternative High School (Grades 9–12)
- Tse' Bit'Ai Middle School (Grades 7–8)
- Mesa Elementary School (Grades 4–6)
- Eva B. Stokely Elementary School (Grades 4–6)
- Nizhoni Elementary School (Grades K–3)

== Enrollment ==
- 2007-2008 School Year: 6,891 students
- 2006-2007 School Year: 6,737 students
- 2005-2006 School Year: 6,950 students
- 2004-2005 School Year: 7,007 students
- 2003-2004 School Year: 6,948 students
- 2002-2003 School Year: 7,083 students
- 2001-2002 School Year: 7,307 students
- 2000-2001 School Year: 7,325 students

== Demographics ==
There were a total of 6,891 students enrolled in Central Consolidated Schools during the 2007-2008 school year. The gender makeup of the district was 48.59% female and 51.41% male. The racial makeup of the district was 89.22% Native American, 8.29% White, 2.12% Hispanic, 0.26% African American, and 0.12% Asian/Pacific Islander.

== See also ==
- List of school districts in New Mexico
