= Brenda Jesus =

American politician

Member of the Navajo Nation Council
- Incumbent
- Assumed office January 2023

Personal details
- Education: Diné College; Grand Canyon University

Brenda Jesus is an American and Navajo politician serving as a delegate on the Navajo Nation Council, where she chairs the Resources and Development Committee (RDC). As a council delegate, Jesus has focused on natural resource management, tribal governance, and economic development. She supports the coal industry, citing its economic importance to Navajo families, and co-sponsored legislation to strengthen the tribe's authority over uranium hauling. Jesus has also publicly raised concerns about a lack of tribal consultation from the U.S. government regarding the creation of the Baaj Nwaavjo I'tah Kukveni – Ancestral Footprints of the Grand Canyon National Monument.

== Early life and education ==
Jesus is from St. Michaels, Arizona. She is of the Tsi'naajinii (Black Streak Wood People) Clan and born into the Tódích'ii'nii (Bitter Water People) Clan.

She earned a bachelor's in business administration from Diné College in 2019, with a major in management and a minor in economic development. Jesus also holds a M.B.A. with an emphasis in project management from Grand Canyon University.

== Career ==
Jesus's career has included roles in local government, business management, and organizational leadership management. She was elected as a delegate to the Navajo Nation Council, where she was selected to serve as the chairwoman of the Resources and Development Committee (RDC). She has stated she works to advocate for an improved quality of life and aims to "create and bridge relationships to diversify living conditions" on the Navajo Nation.

=== Navajo Nation Council ===
In May 2023, Jesus attended a meeting with U.S. Interior Secretary Deb Haaland regarding the proposed Baaj Nwaavjo I'tah Kukveni – Ancestral Footprints of the Grand Canyon National Monument. Jesus later expressed concern over what she described as a lack of proper tribal consultation, stating she was not given an opportunity to speak at the meeting. She also noted that the RDC had not been officially informed of the President of the Navajo Nation's supportive stance on the monument. During an August 2023 committee meeting on the subject, Jesus asked a tribal official if the monument's designation could be reversed if Donald Trump were re-elected as president.

During the council's 2023 summer session, Jesus participated in a debate over the potential purchase of Goulding's Lodge. She questioned the severity of "12 recognized environmental conditions" that were listed in the property documents.

On February 23, 2024, Jesus attended the groundbreaking ceremony for the renovation and kitchen addition at the Oak Springs Chapter House. In August 2024, Jesus co-sponsored emergency legislation to amend the Nation's 2012 Radioactive and Related Substances Transportation Act. The measure was intended to strengthen the tribe's authority over the hauling of uranium ore.

At a Central Navajo Agency Council meeting on September 28, 2024, Jesus spoke about the RDC's oversight of local Navajo chapters. She relayed complaints from the community level that chapters were not assisting residents with funding. In response to reports of restraining orders being issued at chapters, she called for a "return to kinship" and advocated for government reform by amending the tribal code. At the same meeting, she identified health issues stemming from over 500 abandoned uranium sites as a major concern, noting that council delegates had recently traveled to Washington, D.C., to advocate for the reauthorization of the Radiation Exposure Compensation Act (RECA). She also listed telecommunications, homesite leases, forestry, the Navajo Agricultural Products Industry (NAPI), and the Navajo Hopi Partitioned Lands as other key issues being addressed by the RDC.

Jesus voted for Donald Trump in the 2024 U.S. presidential election. Following his re-election, she expressed support for the coal industry, stating that "Without coal, a lot of Navajo families would not have had any source of income." She voiced hope that U.S. president Trump's administration would help save the Four Corners Power Plant, the last remaining coal-fired plant on the Navajo Nation, from its scheduled closure. Jesus has described the debate over coal as a "complicated" and "nuanced situation." She acknowledged its "risks," stating she has "witnessed the impact of depleted watersheds... and coal workers struggling to get health care," but also emphasized its "opportunities for a living."

== Personal life ==
Jesus resides in her original community of St. Michaels, Arizona, with her spouse and children.

== See also ==
- Native American women in politics
