= Indian Wells, Arizona =

Unincorporated community in the state of Arizona, United States

Indian Wells, Arizona Tó Hahadleeh (Navajo)
- Unincorporated community
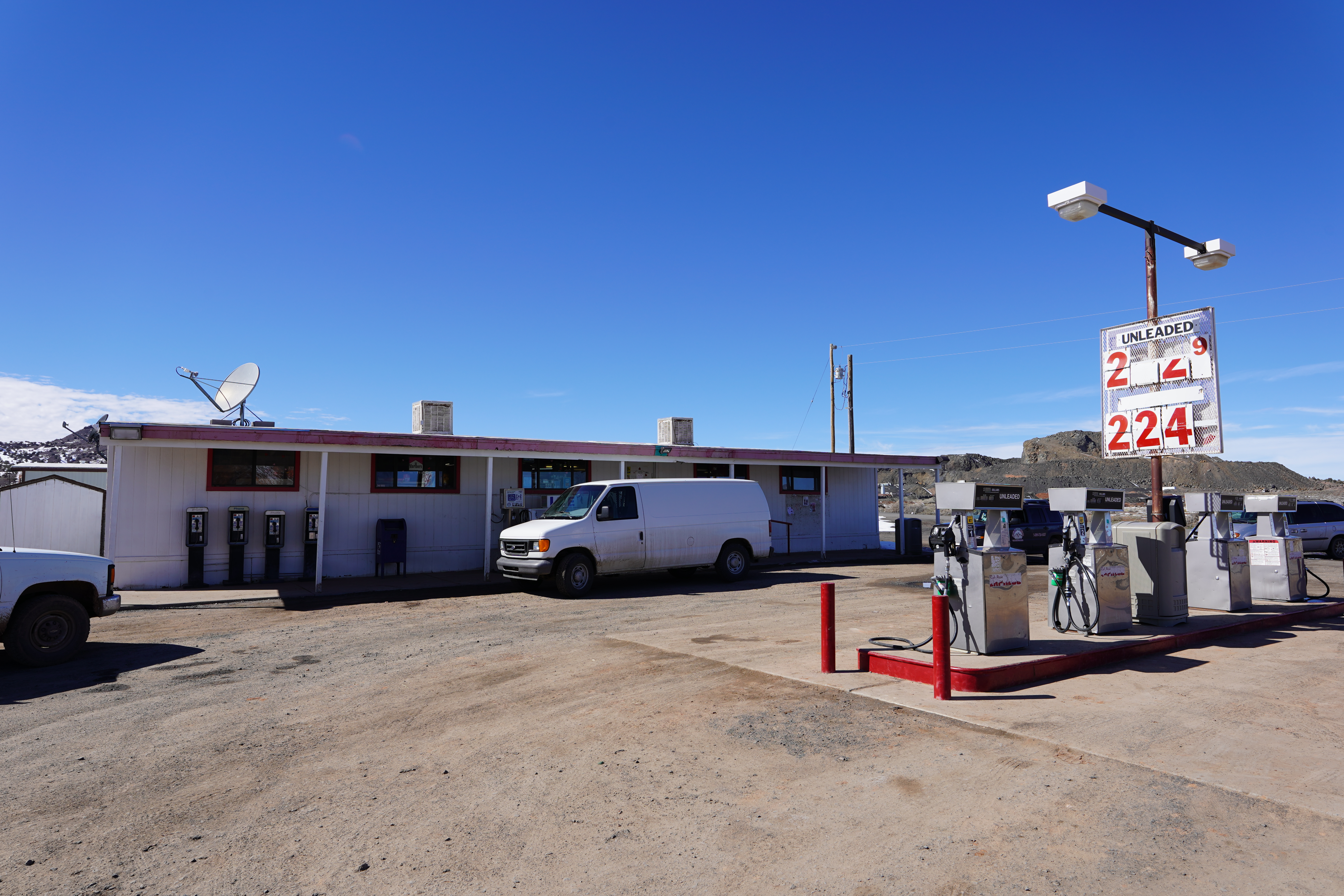
- Indian Wells Trading Post and Post Office

- Location of Indian Wells in Navajo County, Arizona.

- Location within the state of Arizona Indian Wells, Arizona (the United States)
- Coordinates: 35°24′20″N 110°5′5″W
- Country: United States
- State: Arizona
- County: Navajo

Area
  - Total: 10.40 sq mi (26.93 km^{2})
  - Land: 10.40 sq mi (26.93 km^{2})
  - Water: 0 sq mi (0.00 km^{2})
- Elevation: 6,250 ft (1,900 m)

Population (2020)
  - Total: 232
  - Density: 22.3/sq mi (8.62/km^{2})
- Time zone: UTC-7 (Mountain (MST))
  - Summer (DST): UTC-6 (MDT)
- ZIP codes: 86031
- FIPS code: 04-35310
- GNIS feature ID: 2582801

Indian Wells (Navajo: Tó Hahadleeh) is a census-designated place in Navajo County, Arizona, United States. Indian Wells Elementary School is located in the town, it serves 600 students. It is also the name of the local Navajo chapter of the Navajo Nation Council. Indian Wells is served by a post office with the ZIP code of 86031. The ZIP Code Tabulation Area for ZIP Code 86031 had a population of 1,856 at the 2010 census, with 255 in Indian Wells itself.

== Geography ==
Indian Wells is located at 35°24′20″N 110°5′5″W (35.4055684, -110.0848452). According to the United States Census Bureau, the community has a total area of 10.4 square miles, all land.

=== Climate ===
According to the Köppen Climate Classification system, Indian Wells has a semi-arid climate, abbreviated "BSk" on climate maps.

== Demographics ==
Historical population
| Census | Pop. | Note | %± |
|---|---|---|---|
| 2000 | 2,445 | | — |
| 2010 | 255 | | −89.6% |
| 2020 | 232 | | −9.0% |
U.S. Decennial Census

As of the census of 2000, there were 2,445 people, 633 households, and 508 families living in the ZCTA. There were 1,067 housing units. The racial makeup of the ZCTA was 1.3% White, 0.1% African American, 97.5% Native American, <0.1% from other races, and 1.1% from two or more races. Hispanic or Latino of any race were 0.9% of the population.

There were 633 households, out of which 54.3% had children under the age of 18 living with them, 49.6% were married couples living together, 24.3% had a female householder with no husband present, and 19.7% were non-families. 18.8% of all households were made up of individuals, and 6.8% had someone living alone who was 65 years of age or older. The average household size was 3.86 and the average family size was 4.49.

In the ZCTA the population was spread out, with 25.7% under the age of 18, 9.2% from 18 to 24, 25.8% from 25 to 44, 14.6% from 45 to 64, and 12.4% who were 65 years of age or older. The median age was 26.3 years. For every 100 females, there were 94.2 males. For every 100 females age 18 and over, there were 98.8 males.

== Education ==
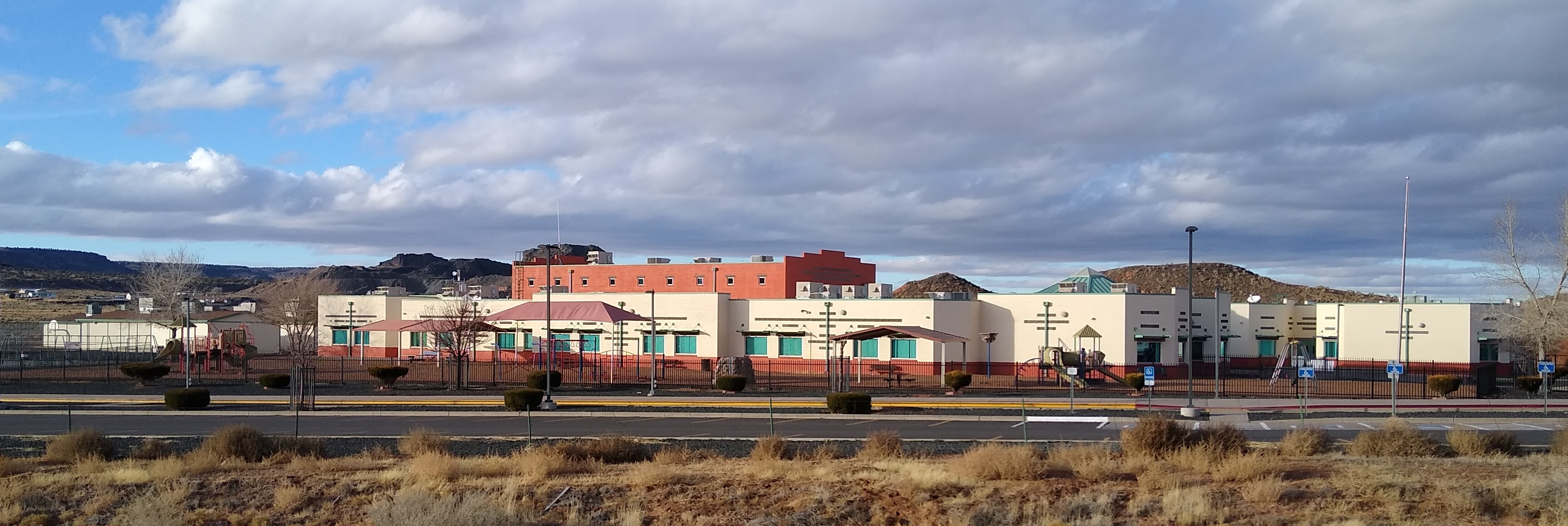
Indian Wells Elementary School

The school district is Holbrook Unified School District. It operates Indian Wells Elementary School in Indian Wells. Indian Wells Elementary, which opened in 2002, was built so students could attend elementary school in the community instead of in Holbrook. The district's public secondary schools are Holbrook Junior High School and Holbrook High School.
