= Helena Nez Begay =

Member of the Navajo Nation Council
- Incumbent
- Assumed office January 10, 2023
- Preceded by: Paul Begay Jr.

Personal details
- Citizenship: Navajo Nation; United States
- Children: 5
- Education: Central Arizona College

Helena Nez Begay is a Diné politician serving on the Navajo Nation Council since 2023. She was previously a supervisor at the Kaibeto Senior Center in Kaibito, Arizona.

== Early life and education ==
Begay grew up near the Aermotor windmill, west of K’ai’bii’tó, Arizona near a rural area where her family depended on traditional practices such herding sheep and hauling water for daily use. She is the daughter of Helen Littleman Nez Sage and Wilbert Nez. Born to the Tódích’íi’nii clan (Bitter Water) and born for Tł’ízíłání (Many Goats), Begay's maternal and paternal grandfathers were Naakaii Dine’é and Naasht’ézhí Tábąąhá, respectively. Her grandfather, Tábąąhá Ha’diłch’ałi, encouraged her to pursue education from an early age. After attending preschool at LeChee Chapter in LeChee, Arizona and Kaibeto Boarding School, where she learned English, she eventually earned a degree in early childhood education from Central Arizona College.

== Career ==
Begay worked as a supervisor at the Kaibeto Senior Center, where she advocated on behalf of elders, adults, and youth in her community.

In 2022, Begay ran for a seat on the Navajo Nation Council, challenging incumbent Paul Begay Jr. During her campaign, she expressed her intention to work closely with the five District 1 chapters: Łichíi’ii, Béésh Haagééd, Tsinaabąąs Habitiin, Tónehelį́į́h-Red Lake, and K’ai’bii’tó. Begay's campaign emphasized the need for council members to directly engage with community members, especially those in rural areas, to solve problems related to water access, education, and elder care. She took office on January 10, 2023. Begay serves on the health, education, and human services committee.

== Personal life ==
As of 2022, Begay lives with her partner, Benjamin Yazzie, in White Clay in Apache County, Arizona. Begay has three daughters and two sons. Her sons work as electricians.

== See also ==
- Native American women in politics
