= Tes Nez Iah, Arizona =

- Populated place
- Location within the state of Arizona Tes Nez Iah (the United States)
- Coordinates: 36°56′35″N 109°42′32″W
- Country: United States
- State: Arizona
- County: Apache
- Elevation: 4,751 ft (1,448 m)
- Time zone: UTC-7 (Mountain (MST))
  - Summer (DST): UTC-7 (MST)
- Area code: 928
- FIPS code: 04-73280
- GNIS feature ID: 24651

Tes Nez Iah is a populated place situated in the far north of Apache County, Arizona, United States, just south of the Utah border. It is along the banks of the Chinle Creek, approximately four miles west of Mexican Water. It has an estimated elevation of 4,751 feet (1,448 m) above sea level. The name is derived from the Navajo t'iis nééz íí'á, meaning "tall cottonwood trees".
