= Cherilyn Yazzie =

Member of the Navajo Nation Council
- Incumbent
- Assumed office January 2023

Cherilyn Yazzie is an American and Navajo politician, farmer, and entrepreneur. She serves as a delegate on the 25th Navajo Nation Council where she is the vice chair of the Law and Order Committee.

Yazzie is the co-founder of Coffee Pot Farms, an off-grid farm established to address food insecurity on the Navajo Nation. After working for 13 years as a public health professional and social worker, she was motivated by the lack of access to fresh food on the reservation, a recognized food desert. Her work establishing the farm has been featured in documentaries.

== Early life and education ==
Yazzie's hometown is Dilkon, Arizona. In 1992, she was a sophomore at Holbrook High School, where she played on the basketball team. Her maternal clan is Honágháahnii (One-walks-around), and her paternal clan is Tó tsohnii (Big Water). Her maternal grandfather's clan is Tódich'ii'nii (Bitter Water), and her paternal grandfather's clan is Áshííhí (Salt People).

== Career ==
=== Social work ===
Yazzie worked for 13 years as a public health professional and social worker, managing the nutrition services department for Navajo County Public Health. In this role, she focused on public health and nutrition advocacy. She became aware that the healthy, fresh foods she recommended were not readily available to the community on the Navajo Nation reservation, with clients telling her, "We don't have access to those foods." The reservation is considered a food desert, with only 13 grocery stores for over 150,000 residents across more than 27,000 square miles. This disconnect bothered her, and at age 41, she decided to learn how to farm despite having no prior experience.

=== Coffee Pot Farms ===
Yazzie and her husband, Mike Hester, co-founded Coffee Pot Farms in their hometown of Dilkon, Arizona. The farm was established on land where her paternal grandfather had once grown corn, squash, and watermelon, but which had lain dormant for decades. The farm is off-the-grid, relying on solar power and water trucked in from Dilkon. The 36-acre operation uses greenhouses and drip irrigation to grow over 20 different crops, such as lettuce, bok choy, brassicas, tomatoes, peppers, onions, spinach, and beets, in addition to traditional crops like corn, melons, and squash.

Before the COVID-19 pandemic, the farm sold produce primarily at farm stands on the reservation. When lockdowns forced these stands to close, they pivoted to a digital model, creating a website with GoDaddy. They also founded a community-supported agriculture (CSA) program that serves Navajo and Hopi lands and accepts Supplemental Nutrition Assistance Program (SNAP) assistance, making the produce available to lower-income customers. The farm provided critical food security for Navajo families when pandemic-related supply chain issues interrupted access to groceries in border towns.

Yazzie has stated that her goal is to build a healthy community to ensure that Navajo cultural traditions, stories, songs, and prayers can be passed on to future generations. As of March 2022, she was fundraising to build a well on the property to increase the farm's output.

=== Media ===
Yazzie participated in GoDaddy's Empower initiative, a program for underserved entrepreneurs. This led to her being featured in a GoDaddy docuseries called "Made in America Phoenix," which premiered on October 14, 2021.

She was the subject of a GoDaddy short documentary, "Big Water Summer: A Creation Story." The film documented her entrepreneurial journey, her resilience, and her work to address food inequities on the Navajo Nation. The film was selected to be shown at the SXSW Film Festival in March 2022.

=== Navajo Nation Council ===
Yazzie serves as a delegate on the 25th Navajo Nation Council. She represents the communities of Dilcon, Indian Wells, Teesto, Whitecone, and Greasewood Springs. She is a member of the Budget & Finance Committee and also holds the position of Vice Chair of the Law and Order Committee.

In 2024, as vice chair of the Law and Order Committee, Yazzie sponsored Legislation No. 0195-24. The bill seeks to amend and update the Navajo Nation Child Support Guidelines, which had not been updated since the original Child Support Act was passed in 1994. The proposed amendments included an increase in child support payments by 10 to 20 percent of the parental gross income. The legislation passed the Law and Order Committee unanimously and was forwarded to the Health, Education and Human Services Committee for final authority.

== Personal life ==
Yazzie is married to Mike Hester, with whom she co-founded and operates Coffee Pot Farms. Her father died from COVID-19 in 2021.

== See also ==
- List of Native American politicians
- Native American women in politics
