= 1989 Navajo Nation Council reforms =

Aspect of US federal and Navajo nation law

The 1989 Navajo Nation Council Reforms, also known as the Title II Amendments were a series of Constitutional changes to the government structure of the Navajo Nation. Following 1985 reforms to the Judicial Branch, the reforms were meant to separate the powers of the Tribal Council (the legislative branch) the President (the executive branch) and the Supreme Court (the judicial branch) with a checks and balances system similar to that of the U.S. Constitution. The resolutions were adopted by the Council on December 15, 1989 and became law on April 11, 1990.

== Background ==
The Navajo Nation has an uncodified constitution, so the Tribal Council has the power to change its own operation with simple resolutions.

=== Peter MacDonald ===
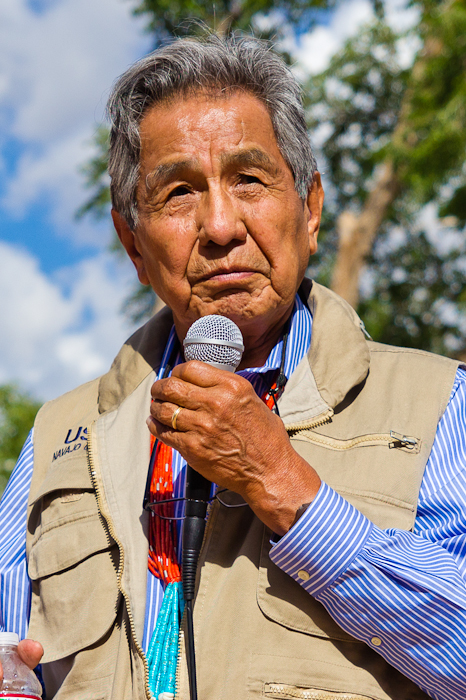
Peter MacDonald speaking in 2012

The executive of the Navajo Nation was previously the Tribal Chairman, and they possessed a lot of power. Peter MacDonald was the 7th Tribal Chairman, and he had an interest in wielding his expansive political power. He was a member of Richard Nixon's Committee to Re-Elect the President. He had a strained relationship with the Senator from Arizona Barry Goldwater. He delivered 90% of Navajo votes to elect a Democratic Governor of Arizona, and Goldwater retaliated by supporting the Hopi in a land dispute, causing Navajo citizens to lose their homes. He was often referred to as "the most powerful Indian in the USA".

MacDonald faced accusations of corruption involving kickback schemes, such as selling a ranch to the Navajo Nation at a $7.2 million profit. These actions resulted in the Tribal Council putting him on administrative leave. MacDonald however refused to step down, and after a five-month standoff, an interim Chairman was appointed. The situation grew confusing as there were at times up to three men claiming the title of Tribal Chairman. On July 20, 1989, rioters from competing group clashed outside an administrative building, resulting in the deaths of two MacDonald supporters. His supporters claimed that the Navajo Police Department was brutalizing them as an attempt to remove MacDonald from power. A group of Tribal Councilmen managed to gather enough political support to remove MacDonald, and he was arrested and put on trial with some of his supporters. Chairman MacDonald served 8 years of his 14-year sentence in federal prison, having his sentence commuted by Bill Clinton on his last day in office. Out of 32 men originally indicted, only 10 (including MacDonald) were sentenced.

== Reforms ==
In deciding what reforms should be made, the Tribal Council looked to the case of Chairman MacDonald and decided that the constitutional crisis resulted from a lack of oversight and too much power vested in the executive.

- Formally defined separation of powers between the Executive and Legislative Branches
- Creation of the office of the President and Vice-President of the Navajo Nation
- Limits on the powers of the Executive and Legislative Branches.
- Reduced the number of legislative committees from eighteen to twelve.
- The power to appoint members of committees was vested in the new Speaker of the Council

== Legacy ==
=== Later Reforms ===
In 1998, the Tribal Council adopted the Navajo Nation Local Governance Act, giving the dozens of local Navajo chapters some ability to make their own decisions. The size of the Council was eventually reduced to 24 members from 88.

=== Criticism ===
The Title II Reforms and subsequent changes have been criticized as being handled entirely by leadership, rather than via referendum or ballot initiative. Some have also requested that a written Constitution be created, to avoid further crises. The three-branch model has been criticized as being too similar to the U.S. Constitution and antithetical to Navajo cultural principles. Switching to a parliamentary system has been suggested as a solution. Corruption has also persisted despite the Title II reforms, one such scandal resulting in President Shirley being removed from office.
