= Holbrook High School (Arizona) =

School in Holbrook, Arizona

- Home of the Roadrunners

Location
- 455 N. 8th Avenue; Holbrook, Arizona 86025; United States; 34°54′23″N 110°10′13″W

Information
- School type: Public high school
- Motto: Helping Unique Students Develop
- School district: Holbrook Unified School District
- CEEB code: 030170
- Principal: Clete Hargrave
- Teaching staff: 42.51 (FTE)
- Grades: 9-12
- Enrollment: 748 (2023–2024)
- Student to teacher ratio: 17.60
- Colors: Red, blue, and white
- Mascot: Roadrunner
- Website: www.holbrook.k12.az.us/o/hhs/

Holbrook High School is a high school in Holbrook, Arizona, United States. It is the only high school under the jurisdiction of the Holbrook Unified School District. Adjacent to the school is a Bureau of Indian Affairs-operated dormitory, the Tiisyatin Residential Hall, housing a maximum of 128 students.

Holbrook USD (which is the high school's attendance boundary) serves the majority of the city of Holbrook and several census-designated places in Navajo County, Arizona: Greasewood, Indian Wells, Sun Valley, Woodruff, and much of Dilkon and Whitecone.

== Notable alumni ==
- Mike Budenholzer, former professional basketball player overseas; former assistant coach of the NBA's San Antonio Spurs; former head coach of the NBA's Atlanta Hawks; former head coach of the NBA's Milwaukee Bucks and current head coach of the Phoenix Suns.
- Cherilyn Yazzie, politician, farmer, and entrepreneur
