= White Rock, San Juan County, New Mexico =

Navajo settlement in New Mexico, US

Coordinates: 36°05′24″N 108°16′33″W

White Rock (Navajo: Tséłgaii) is a Navajo settlement (hamlet) in San Juan County, New Mexico, United States. It is named after a cliff exposure to the northeast of the settlement. The settlement is also a chapter of the Shiprock Agency of the Navajo Nation.
