= Upper Fruitland, New Mexico =

Upper Fruitland, New Mexico Doo Alkʼahii (Navajo)
- Census-designated place
- Location of Upper Fruitland, New Mexico

- Location in the United States
- Coordinates: 36°43′18″N 108°21′20″W
- Country: United States
- State: New Mexico
- County: San Juan

Area
  - Total: 7.84 sq mi (20.30 km^{2})
  - Land: 7.65 sq mi (19.82 km^{2})
  - Water: 0.18 sq mi (0.47 km^{2})
- Elevation: 5,174 ft (1,577 m)

Population (2020)
  - Total: 1,623
  - Density: 212.1/sq mi (81.88/km^{2})
- Time zone: UTC-7 (Mountain (MST))
  - Summer (DST): UTC-6 (MDT)
- Area code: 505
- FIPS code: 35-81177
- GNIS feature ID: 2409381

Upper Fruitland (Navajo: Doo Alkʼahii; roughly translated as "a place where animals do not get fat" or "the condition where there is no fat on the animals") is a census-designated place (CDP) in San Juan County, New Mexico, United States. As of the 2020 census, Upper Fruitland had a population of 1,623. It is part of the Farmington Metropolitan Statistical Area.

== Geography ==
According to the United States Census Bureau, the CDP has a total area of 7.8 square miles (20.2 km^{2}), of which 7.5 square miles (19.4 km^{2}) is land and 0.3 square mile (0.8 km^{2}) (3.98%) is water.

Upper Fruitland should not be confused with Fruitland, which is located across the San Juan River. Upper Fruitland is inside the boundaries of the Navajo Reservation, whereas Fruitland is not.

== Demographics ==
Historical population
Census	Pop.	Note	%±
2000	1,664		—
2020	1,623		—
U.S. Decennial Census

As of the census of 2000, there were 1,664 people, 431 households, and 374 families residing in the CDP. The population density was 222.6 inhabitants per square mile (85.9/km^{2}). There were 468 housing units at an average density of 62.6 per square mile (24.2/km^{2}). The racial makeup of the CDP was 97.78% Native American, 0.96% White, 0.06% Pacific Islander, 0.18% from other races, and 1.02% from two or more races. Hispanic or Latino of any race were 1.44% of the population.

There were 431 households, out of which 53.8% had children under the age of 18 living with them, 55.2% were married couples living together, 23.4% had a female householder with no husband present, and 13.0% were non-families. 10.7% of all households were made up of individuals, and 3.0% had someone living alone who was 65 years of age or older. The average household size was 3.86 and the average family size was 4.16.

In the CDP, the population was spread out, with 37.8% under the age of 18, 11.4% from 18 to 24, 26.7% from 25 to 44, 18.4% from 45 to 64, and 5.7% who were 65 years of age or older. The median age was 26 years. For every 100 females, there were 98.1 males. For every 100 females age 18 and over, there were 91.7 males.

The median income for a household in the CDP was $25,096, and the median income for a family was $26,346. Males had a median income of $19,567 versus $15,822 for females. The per capita income for the CDP was $9,246. About 27.7% of families and 26.8% of the population were below the poverty line, including 28.6% of those under age 18 and 58.3% of those age 65 or over.

== Education ==
Central Consolidated Schools serves Upper Fruitland as well as other communities in western San Juan Couty.

== See also ==
- List of census-designated places in New Mexico
