= Hard Rock, Arizona =

- CDP
- Location within the state of Arizona Hard Rock (the United States)
- Coordinates: 36°01′51″N 110°30′17″W
- Country: United States
- State: Arizona
- County: Navajo

Area
  - Total: 5.92 sq mi (15.34 km^{2})
  - Land: 5.92 sq mi (15.34 km^{2})
  - Water: 0 sq mi (0.00 km^{2})
- Elevation: 6,021 ft (1,835 m)

Population (2020)
  - Total: 38
  - Density: 6.4/sq mi (2.48/km^{2})
- Time zone: UTC-7 (MST)
- Area code: 928
- FIPS code: 04-31182
- GNIS feature ID: 2582797

Hard Rock is a census-designated place (CDP) in Navajo County, Arizona, United States. The population was 94 at the 2010 census.

== Geography ==
The CDP has a total area of 5.92 square miles (15.3 km^{2}), all land.

== Demographics ==
Historical population
Census	Pop.	Note	%±
2010	94		—
2020	38		−59.6%
U.S. Decennial Census

As of the 2010 census, there were 94 people living in the CDP: 43 male and 51 female. 37 were 19 years old or younger, 20 were ages 20–34, 17 were between the ages of 35 and 49, 9 were between 50 and 64, and the remaining 11 were aged 65 and above. The median age was 30.0 years.

The racial makeup of the CDP was 94.7% American Indian, 3.2% Asian, 1.1% White, and 5.3% two or more races. 12.8% of the population were Hispanic or Latino of any race.

There were 28 households in the CDP, 20 family households (71.4%) and 8 non-family households (28.6%), with an average household size of 3.36. Of the family households, 10 were married couples living together, 8 were single mothers, and 2 w3ere single fathers; the non-family households included 8 adults living alone: 3 male and 5 female.

The CDP contained 41 housing units, of which 28 were occupied and 13 were vacant.
