= Smith Lake, New Mexico =

Unincorporated community in New Mexico, United States

Smith Lake, New Mexico Tsin Názbąs Siʼą́ (Navajo)
- Unincorporated community
- Location within New Mexico Location within the United States
- Coordinates: 35°31′20″N 108°08′23″W
- Country: United States
- State: New Mexico
- County: McKinley
- Elevation: 7,260 ft (2,210 m)
- Time zone: UTC-7 (Mountain (MST))
  - Summer (DST): UTC-6 (MDT)
- ZIP code: 87365
- Area code: 505
- GNIS feature ID: 902845

Smith Lake (Navajo: Tsin Názbąs Siʼą́) is an unincorporated community in McKinley County, New Mexico, United States. Smith Lake is located along New Mexico State Road 371, 9.5 miles (15.3 km) north-northeast of Thoreau.

It is in Gallup-McKinley County Public Schools. Zoned schools are Thoreau Elementary School, Thoreau Middle School, and Thoreau High School.
