= Nenahnezad, New Mexico =

Nenahnezad, New Mexico Niinahnízaad (Navajo)
- CDP
- Location of Nenahnezad, New Mexico.

- Location in the United States
- Coordinates: 36°44′34″N 108°25′14″W
- Country: United States
- State: New Mexico
- County: San Juan

Area
  - Total: 3.56 sq mi (9.23 km^{2})
  - Land: 3.51 sq mi (9.08 km^{2})
  - Water: 0.058 sq mi (0.15 km^{2})
- Elevation: 5,243 ft (1,598 m)

Population (2020)
  - Total: 576
  - Density: 164.3/sq mi (63.43/km^{2})
- Time zone: UTC-7 (Mountain (MST))
  - Summer (DST): UTC-6 (MDT)
- Area code: 505
- FIPS code: 35-51715
- GNIS feature ID: 2408912

Nenahnezad (Navajo: Niinahnízaad) is a census-designated place (CDP) in San Juan County, New Mexico, United States. As of the 2020 census, Nenahnezad had a population of 576. Nenahnezad is a chapter community just to the south of Fruitland, between the towns of Farmington and Shiprock. It is part of the Farmington Metropolitan Statistical Area.

== Geography ==
According to the United States Census Bureau, the CDP has a total area of 3.6 square miles (9.3 km^{2}), of which 3.5 square miles (9.1 km^{2}) is land and 0.1 square miles (0.26 km^{2}) (2.22%) is water.

== Demographics ==
Historical population
Census	Pop.	Note	%±
2020	576		—
U.S. Decennial Census

At the 2000 census there were 726 people, 193 households and 154 families residing in the CDP. The population density was 205.6 inhabitants per square mile (79.4/km^{2}). There were 231 housing units at an average density of 65.4 units per square mile (25.3 units/km^{2}). The racial makeup of the CDP was 97.52% Native American, 0.69% White, 0.14% Asian, 0.14% from other races, and 1.52% from two or more races. Hispanic or Latino of any race were 1.93% of the population.

There were 193 households, of which 45.6% had children under the age of 18 living with them, 48.2% were married couples living together, 25.9% had a female householder with no husband present, and 20.2% were non-families. 20.2% of all households were made up of individuals, and 3.1% had someone living alone who was 65 years of age or older. The average household size was 3.76 and the average family size was 4.38.

38.4% of the population were under the age of 18, 10.6% from 18 to 24, 27.3% from 25 to 44, 17.1% from 45 to 64, and 6.6% who were 65 years of age or older. The median age was 26 years. For every 100 females, there were 103.9 males. For every 100 females age 18 and over, there were 97.8 males.

The median household income was $22,054 and the median family income was $21,250. Males had a median income of $25,156 vcompared with $15,577 for females. The per capita income for the CDP was $6,041. About 51.4% of families and 59.4% of the population were below the poverty line, including 63.0% of those under age 18 and 49.0% of those age 65 or over.

== Education ==
The Bureau of Indian Education (BIE) operates the Nenahnezad Community School.

Central Consolidated Schools serves Nenahnezad as well as other communities in western San Juan County.
