= Newcomb, New Mexico =

Newcomb, New Mexico Bis Deezʼáhí (Navajo)
- CDP
- Location of Newcomb, New Mexico

- Location in the United States
- Coordinates: 36°17′08″N 108°43′45″W
- Country: United States
- State: New Mexico
- County: San Juan

Area
  - Total: 9.68 sq mi (25.07 km^{2})
  - Land: 9.68 sq mi (25.07 km^{2})
  - Water: 0 sq mi (0.00 km^{2})
- Elevation: 5,558 ft (1,694 m)

Population (2020)
  - Total: 494
  - Density: 51.0/sq mi (19.71/km^{2})
- Time zone: UTC-7 (Mountain (MST))
  - Summer (DST): UTC-6 (MDT)
- ZIP code: 87455
- Area code: 505
- FIPS code: 35-51770
- GNIS feature ID: 2408922

Newcomb (Navajo: Bis Deezʼáhí) is a census-designated place (CDP) in San Juan County, New Mexico, United States. As of the 2020 census, Newcomb had a population of 494. It is part of the Farmington Metropolitan Statistical Area.

It is on the Trails of the Ancients Byway, one of the designated New Mexico Scenic Byways. Newcomb was founded in 1887 when Joseph Wilkin and Henry Noel set up a trading post. It was known as Crozier from 1903 to 1919.

== Geography ==
According to the United States Census Bureau, the CDP has a total area of 5.9 square miles (15 km^{2}), all land.

== Demographics ==
Historical population
| Census | Pop. | Note | %± |
|---|---|---|---|
| 2020 | 494 | | — |
U.S. Decennial Census

As of the census of 2000, there were 387 people, 123 households, and 84 families residing in the CDP. The population density was 65.1 inhabitants per square mile (25.1/km^{2}). There were 138 housing units at an average density of 23.2 per square mile (9.0/km^{2}). The racial makeup of the CDP was 83.20% Native American, 13.70% White, 0.26% African American, 0.52% from other races, and 2.33% from two or more races. Hispanic or Latino of any race were 1.81% of the population.

There were 123 households, out of which 30.1% had children under the age of 18 living with them, 33.3% were married couples living together, 26.8% had a female householder with no husband present, and 31.7% were non-families. 27.6% of all households were made up of individuals, and 7.3% had someone living alone who was 65 years of age or older. The average household size was 3.15 and the average family size was 3.95.

In the CDP, the population was spread out, with 33.6% under the age of 18, 8.3% from 18 to 24, 26.4% from 25 to 44, 23.0% from 45 to 64, and 8.8% who were 65 years of age or older. The median age was 32 years. For every 100 females, there were 97.4 males. For every 100 females age 18 and over, there were 87.6 males.

The median income for a household in the CDP was $16,500, and the median income for a family was $19,000. Males had a median income of $30,833 versus $34,205 for females. The per capita income for the CDP was $8,584. About 52.0% of families and 48.6% of the population were below the poverty line, including 61.9% of those under age 18 and 51.0% of those age 65 or over.

== Education ==
Central Consolidated Schools serves Newcomb as well as other communities in western San Juan County.

== Notable person ==
- Navajo painter Arthur Begay was born in Newcomb.
- Navajo rug weaver Clara Sherman was born near Newcomb.
