= Lake Valley, San Juan County, New Mexico =

Lake Valley, New Mexico
- Unincorporated community
- Location within New Mexico
- Coordinates: 36°05′24″N 108°09′51″W
- Country: United States
- State: New Mexico
- County: San Juan

Area
  - Total: 8.347 sq mi (21.62 km^{2})
  - Land: 8.347 sq mi (21.62 km^{2})
  - Water: 0 sq mi (0 km^{2})
- Elevation: 5,889 ft (1,795 m)

Population (2010)
  - Total: 64
  - Density: 7.7/sq mi (3.0/km^{2})
- Time zone: UTC-7 (Mountain (MST))
  - Summer (DST): UTC-6 (MDT)
- Area code: 505
- GNIS feature ID: 2584128

Lake Valley (Navajo: Beʼekʼid Halgaii) is an unincorporated community and census-designated place in San Juan County, New Mexico, United States. Its population was 64 as of the 2010 census.

== Geography ==
According to the U.S. Census Bureau, the community has an area of 8.347 square miles (21.62 km^{2}), all land.

== Education ==
Its school district is Farmington Municipal Schools.
