= Naschitti, New Mexico =

Naschitti, New Mexico Nahashchʼidí (Navajo)
- CDP
- Location of Naschitti, New Mexico

- Location in the United States
- Coordinates: 36°03′45″N 108°40′48″W
- Country: United States
- State: New Mexico
- County: San Juan

Area
  - Total: 2.52 sq mi (6.52 km^{2})
  - Land: 2.51 sq mi (6.49 km^{2})
  - Water: 0.012 sq mi (0.03 km^{2})
- Elevation: 5,853 ft (1,784 m)

Population (2020)
  - Total: 272
  - Density: 108.5/sq mi (41.91/km^{2})
- Time zone: UTC-7 (Mountain (MST))
  - Summer (DST): UTC-6 (MDT)
- Area code: 505
- FIPS code: 35-51280
- GNIS feature ID: 2408902

Naschitti is a census-designated place (CDP) in San Juan County, New Mexico, United States. As of the 2020 census, Naschitti had a population of 272. It is part of the Farmington Metropolitan Statistical Area. The town was established in 1886, when Tom Bryan set up a trading post east of the Chuska Mountains. With a Navajo name, Naschitti means "badger springs."

== Geography ==
According to the United States Census Bureau, the CDP has a total area of 2.5 square miles (6.5 km^{2}), of which 2.5 square miles (6.5 km^{2}) is land and 0.40% is water.

== Demographics ==
Historical population
Census	Pop.	Note	%±
2020	272		—
U.S. Decennial Census

As of the census of 2000, there were 360 people, 92 households, and 77 families residing in the CDP. The population density was 142.9 inhabitants per square mile (55.2/km^{2}). There were 107 housing units at an average density of 42.5 per square mile (16.4/km^{2}). The racial makeup of the CDP was 96.94% Native American, 2.50% White, and 0.56% from two or more races.

There were 92 households, out of which 51.1% had children under the age of 18 living with them, 51.1% were married couples living together, 26.1% had a female householder with no husband present, and 16.3% were non-families. 13.0% of all households were made up of individuals, and 1.1% had someone living alone who was 65 years of age or older. The average household size was 3.91 and the average family size was 4.36.

In the CDP, the population was spread out, with 36.4% under the age of 18, 9.2% from 18 to 24, 28.6% from 25 to 44, 19.4% from 45 to 64, and 6.4% who were 65 years of age or older. The median age was 28 years. For every 100 females, there were 87.5 males. For every 100 females age 18 and over, there were 81.7 males.

The median income for a household in the CDP was $34,750, and the median income for a family was $42,361. Males had a median income of $26,667 versus $28,088 for females. The per capita income for the CDP was $13,226. None of the families and 5.9% of the population were living below the poverty line, including no under eighteens and none of those over 64.

== Education ==
Central Consolidated Schools serves Naschitti as well as other communities in western San Juan County.
