= Greasewood, Arizona =

CDP in Navajo County, Arizona

Greasewood, Arizona Díwózhii Biiʼ Tó (Navajo)
- CDP
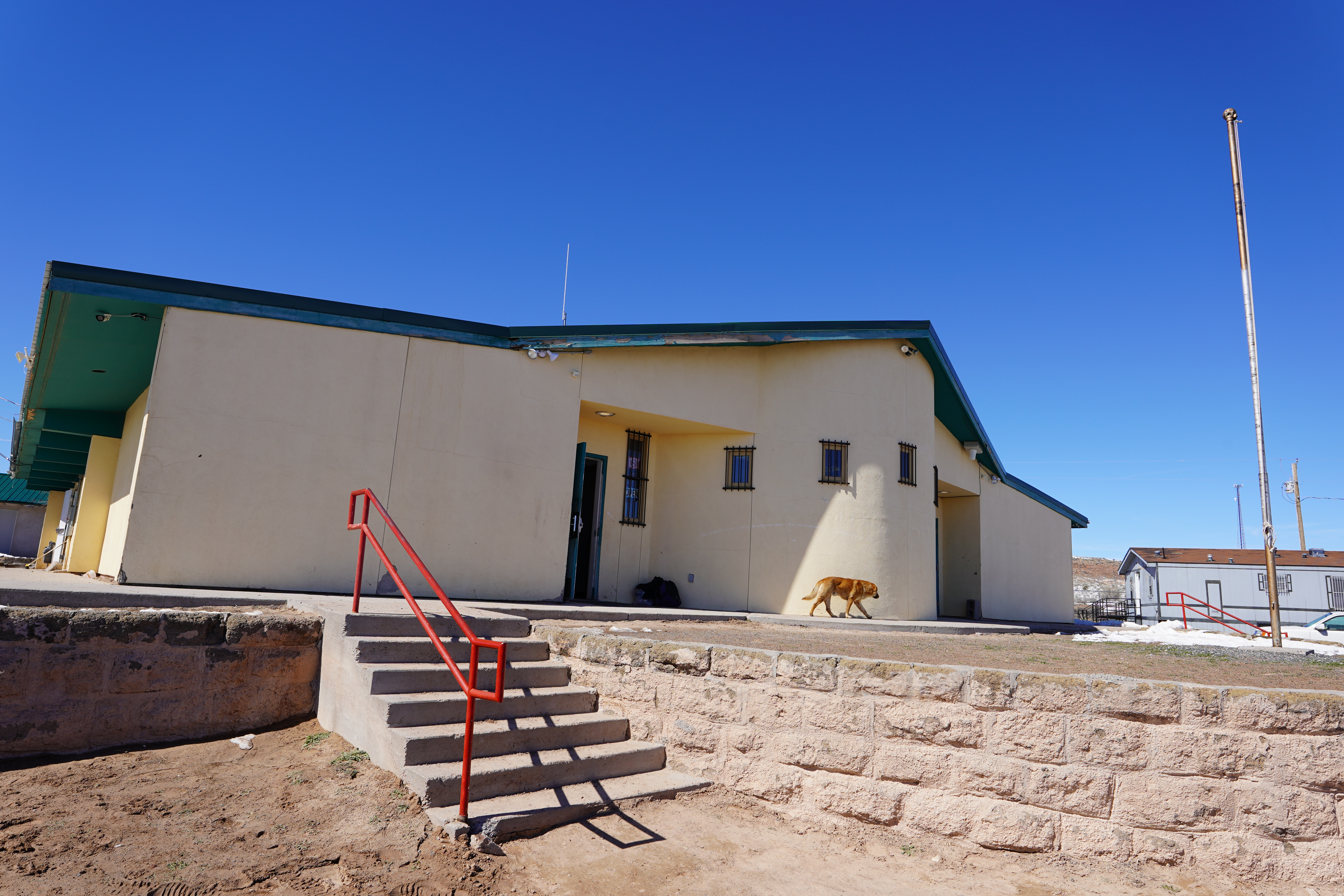
- Greasewood Chapter House

- Location in Navajo County and the state of Arizona

- Location in the United States
- Coordinates: 35°31′45″N 109°52′24″W
- Country: United States
- State: Arizona
- County: Navajo

Area
  - Total: 5.34 sq mi (13.84 km^{2})
  - Land: 5.34 sq mi (13.83 km^{2})
  - Water: 0.0039 sq mi (0.01 km^{2})
- Elevation: 6,040 ft (1,840 m)

Population (2020)
  - Total: 372
  - Density: 70/sq mi (26.9/km^{2})
- Time zone: UTC-7 (MST)
  - Summer (DST): UTC-6 (MDT)
- ZIP code: 86047
- Area code: 928
- FIPS code: 04-29430
- GNIS feature ID: 2408325

Greasewood (Navajo: Díwózhii Biiʼ Tó) is a census-designated place (CDP) in Navajo County, Arizona, United States. The population was 547 at the 2010 census.

== Geography ==
According to the United States Census Bureau, the CDP has a total area of 5.3 square miles (14 km^{2}), all land.

== Demographics ==
Historical population
Census	Pop.	Note	%±
2000	581		—
2010	547		−5.9%
2020	372		−32.0%
U.S. Decennial Census

Languages (2000)	Percent
Spoke Navajo at home	88%
Spoke English at home	12%

At the 2000 census there were 581 people, 126 households, and 106 families living in the CDP. The population density was 108.7 inhabitants per square mile (42.0/km^{2}). There were 182 housing units at an average density of 34.1 per square mile (13.2/km^{2}). The racial makeup of the CDP was 2% White, 97% Native American, and 1% from two or more races. 1% of the population were Hispanic or Latino of any race. Of the 126 households 49% had children under the age of 18 living with them, 54% were married couples living together, 22% had a female householder with no husband present, and 15% were non-families. 14% of households were one person and 2% were one person aged 65 or older. The average household size was 4.1 and the average family size was 4.6.

The age distribution was 47% under the age of 18, 10% from 18 to 24, 24% from 25 to 44, 16% from 45 to 64, and 3% 65 or older. The median age was 19 years. For every 100 females, there were 91.7 males. For every 100 females age 18 and over, there were 95.5 males.

The median household income was $16,583 and the median family income was $20,234. Males had a median income of $28,333 versus $18,750 for females. The per capita income for the CDP was $5,490. About 42% of families and 44% of the population were below the poverty line, including 48% of those under age 18 and 35% of those age 65 or over.

== Education ==
The area is served by the Holbrook Unified School District. Holbrook Junior High School and Holbrook High School, in Holbrook, serve Greasewood.

Some areas outside of the Greaswood CDP are zoned to Ganado Unified School District, which operates Ganado Primary school, Ganado Elementary School, Ganado Middle School and Ganado High School in Ganado Az.
