= Dennehotso, Arizona =

Census-designated place in Apache County, Arizona, United States

Dennehotso, Arizona Deinihootso (Navajo)
- Census-designated place
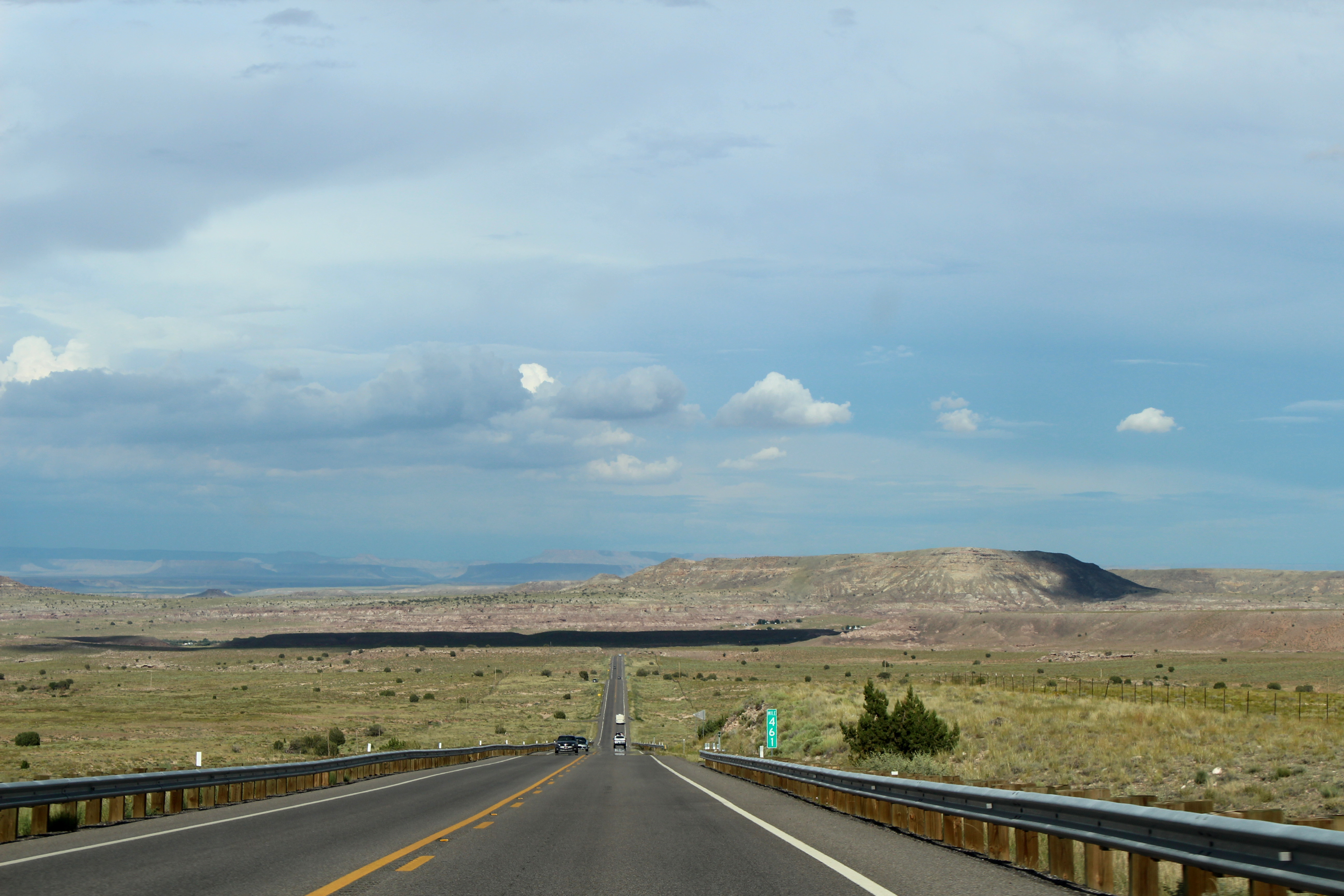
- U.S. Route 160 in Dennehotso, July 2015

- Location in Apache County and the state of Arizona

- Location in the United States
- Coordinates: 36°50′34″N 109°51′10″W
- Country: United States
- State: Arizona
- County: Apache

Area
  - Total: 9.96 sq mi (25.80 km^{2})
  - Land: 9.95 sq mi (25.78 km^{2})
  - Water: 0.012 sq mi (0.03 km^{2})
- Elevation: 5,069 ft (1,545 m)

Population (2020)
  - Total: 587
  - Density: 59.0/sq mi (22.77/km^{2})
- Time zone: UTC-7 (MST)
  - Summer (DST): UTC-6 (MDT)
- ZIP code: 86535
- Area code: 928
- FIPS code: 04-18580
- GNIS feature ID: 2408658

Dennehotso (Navajo: Deinihootso) is a census-designated place (CDP) in Apache County, Arizona, United States. The population was 746 at the 2010 census.

== Geography ==
According to the United States Census Bureau, the CDP has a total area of 10.0 square miles (25.8 km^{2}), all land.

== Demographics ==
Historical population
Census	Pop.	Note	%±
2020	587		—
U.S. Decennial Census

Languages (2000)	Percent
Spoke Navajo at home	96.4%
Spoke English at home	3.6%

As of the census of 2000, there were 734 people, 168 households, and 141 families residing in the CDP. The population density was 73.8 inhabitants per square mile (28.5/km^{2}). There were 233 housing units at an average density of 23.4 per square mile (9.0/km^{2}). The racial makeup of the CDP was 98.6% Native American, 0.8% White, and 0.5% from two or more races. 0.3% of the population were Hispanic or Latino of any race.

There were 168 households, out of which 56.5% had children under the age of 18 living with them, 55.4% were married couples living together, 24.4% had a female householder with no husband present, and 15.5% were non-families. 14.9% of all households were made up of individuals, and 5.4% had someone living alone who was 65 years of age or older. The average household size was 4.4 and the average family size was 4.9.

In the CDP, the age distribution of the population shows 44.6% under the age of 18, 9.4% from 18 to 24, 24.5% from 25 to 44, 15.4% from 45 to 64, and 6.1% who were 65 years of age or older. The median age was 21 years. For every 100 females, there were 100.5 males. For every 100 females age 18 and over, there were 106.6 males.

The median income for a household in the CDP was $19,844, and the median income for a family was $21,944. Males had a median income of $27,143 versus $16,250 for females. The per capita income for the CDP was $5,445. About 37.0% of families and 40.6% of the population were below the poverty line, including 47.9% of those under age 18 and 28.9% of those age 65 or over.

== Education ==
The area is a part of the Red Mesa Unified School District. The city is served by Red Mesa K–8 School and Red Mesa High School. Originally the territory was within the Chinle School District. In July 1983 the Red Mesa Unified School District formed, splitting from the Chinle School District.

The Bureau of Indian Education (BIE) operates the Dennehotso Boarding School, serving grades K–8. The two buildings are OFMC projects: a 46,545-square-foot (4,324.2 m^{2}) school facility for 186 students and a 10,072-square-foot (935.7 m^{2}) dormitory for 33 students. The scheduled groundbreaking was February 11, 2013. The previous buildings scheduled for demolition had a total of 78,626 square feet (7,304.6 m^{2}) of space. The school provides transportation for students between Baby Rocks and Mexican Water and asks families living outside of that area and/or distant from the highway to use the dormitory.

== Notable people ==
- Brian Yazzie, chef, was born in Dennehotso.

== See also ==
- List of census-designated places in Arizona
