= Iyanbito, New Mexico =

Iyanbito, New Mexico Ayání Bitoʼ (Navajo)
- Census-designated place
- Location within New Mexico Location within the United States
- Coordinates: 35°30′55″N 108°29′16″W
- Country: United States
- State: New Mexico
- County: McKinley

Area
  - Total: 9.54 sq mi (24.71 km^{2})
  - Land: 9.54 sq mi (24.71 km^{2})
  - Water: 0 sq mi (0.00 km^{2})
- Elevation: 6,884 ft (2,098 m)

Population (2020)
  - Total: 1,193
  - Density: 125.0/sq mi (48.28/km^{2})
- Time zone: UTC-7 (Mountain (MST))
  - Summer (DST): UTC-6 (MDT)
- ZIP Code: 87316 (Fort Wingate)
- Area code: 505
- FIPS code: 35-34830
- GNIS feature ID: 2806721

Iyanbito (Navajo: Ayání Bitoʼ) is an unincorporated community and census-designated place (CDP) in McKinley County, New Mexico, United States, on the Navajo Nation. As of the 2020 census, it had a population of 1,193.

== Geography ==
The community is in central McKinley County, 16 miles (26 km) east of Gallup, the county seat. It is bordered to the west by the Church Rock CDP and to the south by the Southern Transcon line of the BNSF Railway. Mesa Butte, elevation 8,020 feet (2,440 m), rises to the north of the CDP.

New Mexico State Road 118 (Historic Route 66) and Interstate 40 pass just south of Iyanbito, leading west to Gallup and southeast 47 miles (76 km) to Grants.

According to the U.S. Census Bureau, the Iyanbito CDP has an area of 9.54 square miles (24.71 km^{2}), all land. The area drains to the South Fork of the Puerco River, which passes just south of the CDP. The west-flowing Puerco River is part of the Little Colorado River watershed.

== Demographics ==
Historical population
Census	Pop.	Note	%±
2020	1,193		—
U.S. Decennial Census

Iyanbito was first listed as a CDP prior to the 2020 census.

== Education ==
It is in Gallup-McKinley County Public Schools.

It is zoned to Catherine A. Miller Elementary School in Church Rock, Kennedy Middle School, and Hiroshi Miyamura High School.
