= Beclabito, New Mexico =

Census-designated place in San Juan County, New Mexico, United States

Beclabito, New Mexico Bitłʼááh Bitoʼ (Navajo)
- Census-designated place
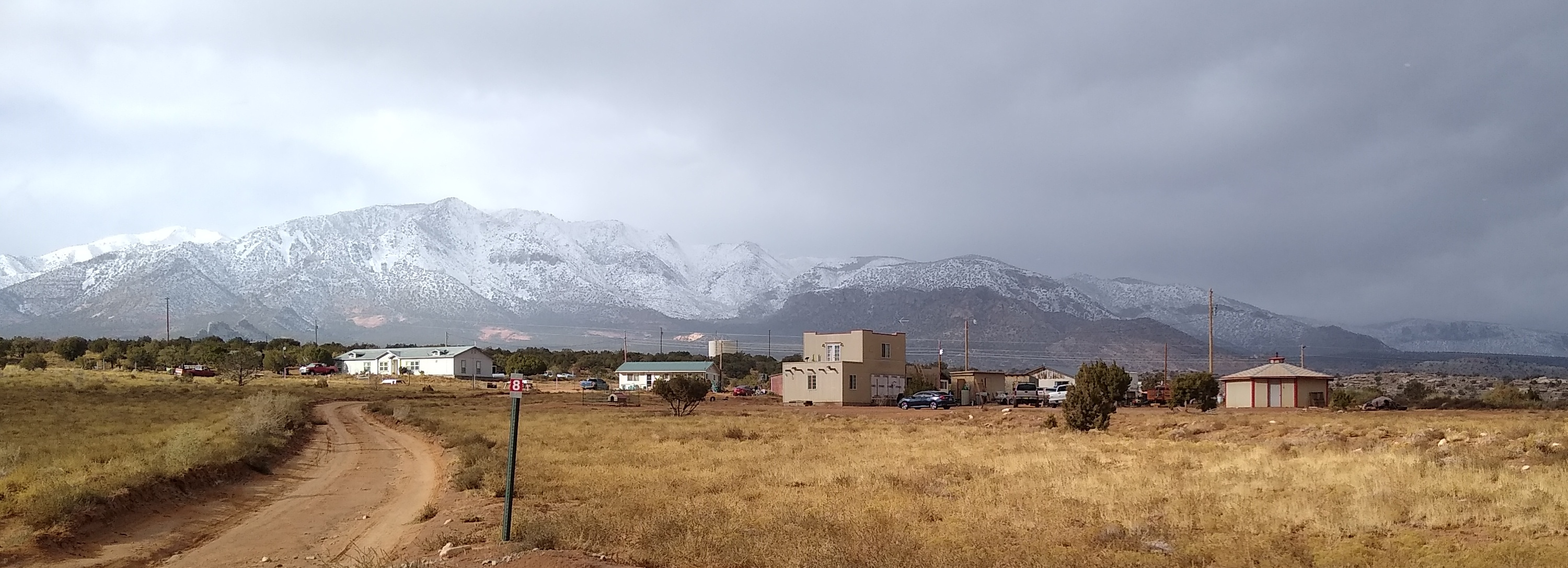
- Houses in Beclabito

- Location of Beclabito, New Mexico

- Location in the United States
- Coordinates: 36°50′00″N 109°00′14″W
- Country: United States
- State: New Mexico
- County: San Juan

Area
  - Total: 7.53 sq mi (19.50 km^{2})
  - Land: 7.53 sq mi (19.50 km^{2})
  - Water: 0 sq mi (0.00 km^{2})
- Elevation: 5,555 ft (1,693 m)

Population (2020)
  - Total: 265
  - Density: 35.2/sq mi (13.59/km^{2})
- Time zone: UTC-7 (Mountain (MST))
  - Summer (DST): UTC-6 (MDT)
- Area code: 505
- FIPS code: 35-06425
- GNIS feature ID: 2407820

Beclabito (Navajo: Bitłʼááh Bitoʼ) is a census-designated place (CDP) in San Juan County, New Mexico, United States. As of the 2020 census, Beclabito had a population of 265. It is part of the Farmington Metropolitan Statistical Area.

== Description ==
The CDP is on the Trails of the Ancients Byway, one of the designated New Mexico Scenic Byways. Its name in Navajo means "bottom spring", a reference to Beclabito Spring.

== Geography ==
According to the United States Census Bureau, the CDP has a total area of 7.5 square miles (19 km^{2}), all land.

== Demographics ==
Historical population
Census	Pop.	Note	%±
2020	265		—
U.S. Decennial Census

Languages (2000)	Percent
Spoke Navajo at home	80.00%
Spoke English at home	20.00%

As of the census of 2000, there were 339 people*, 95 households, and 74 families residing in the CDP. The population density was 45.4 inhabitants per square mile (17.5/km^{2}). There were 130 housing units at an average density of 17.4 per square mile (6.7/km^{2}). The racial makeup of the CDP was 97.94% Native American, 0.59% White, and 1.47% from two or more races. Hispanic or Latino of any race were 0.88% of the population.

There were 95 households, out of which 42.1% had children under the age of 18 living with them, 48.4% were married couples living together, 27.4% had a female householder with no husband present, and 21.1% were non-families. 20.0% of all households were made up of individuals, and 9.5% had someone living alone who was 65 years of age or older. The average household size was 3.57 and the average family size was 4.19.

In the CDP, the population was spread out, with 34.5% under the age of 18, 9.1% from 18 to 24, 29.5% from 25 to 44, 17.7% from 45 to 64, and 9.1% who were 65 years of age or older. The median age was 31 years. For every 100 females, there were 88.3 males. For every 100 females age 18 and over, there were 83.5 males.

The median income for a household in the CDP was $14,766, and the median income for a family was $18,839. Males had a median income of $16,063 versus $24,688 for females. The per capita income for the CDP was $5,401. About 40.3% of families and 49.5% of the population were below the poverty line, including 50.0% of those under age 18 and 100.0% of those age 65 or over.

- Although 2000 US Census only recorded 339 people in the Beclabito area, there are 900 voting members registered at the Beclabito Chapter House, which is a part of the Navajo Nation, and 1500 individuals living in Beclabito and the surrounding area.

== Education ==
Central Consolidated Schools serves Beclabito as well as other communities in western San Juan County.

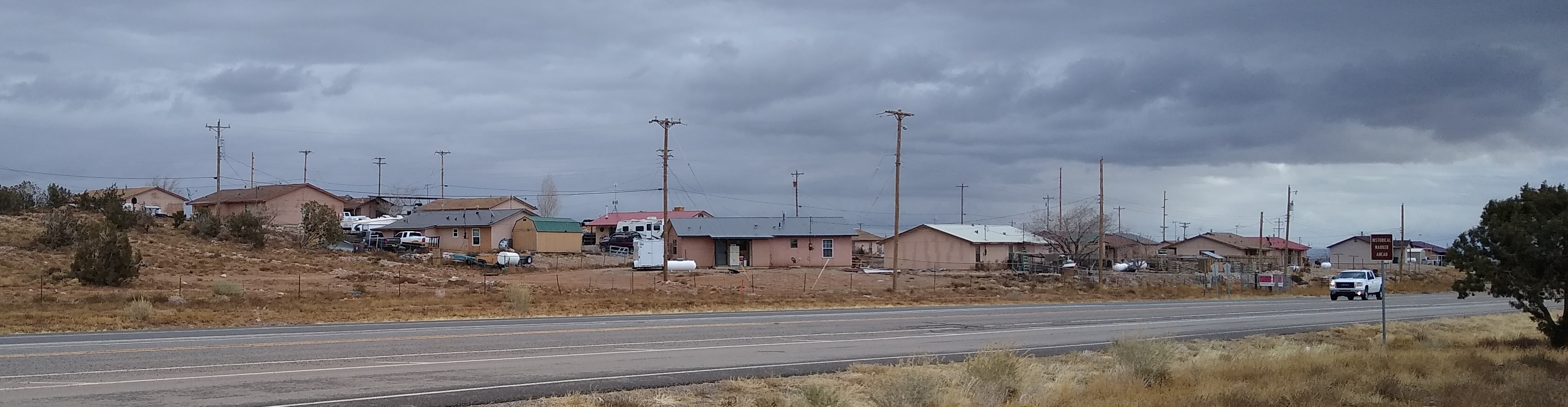
Houses in Beclabito

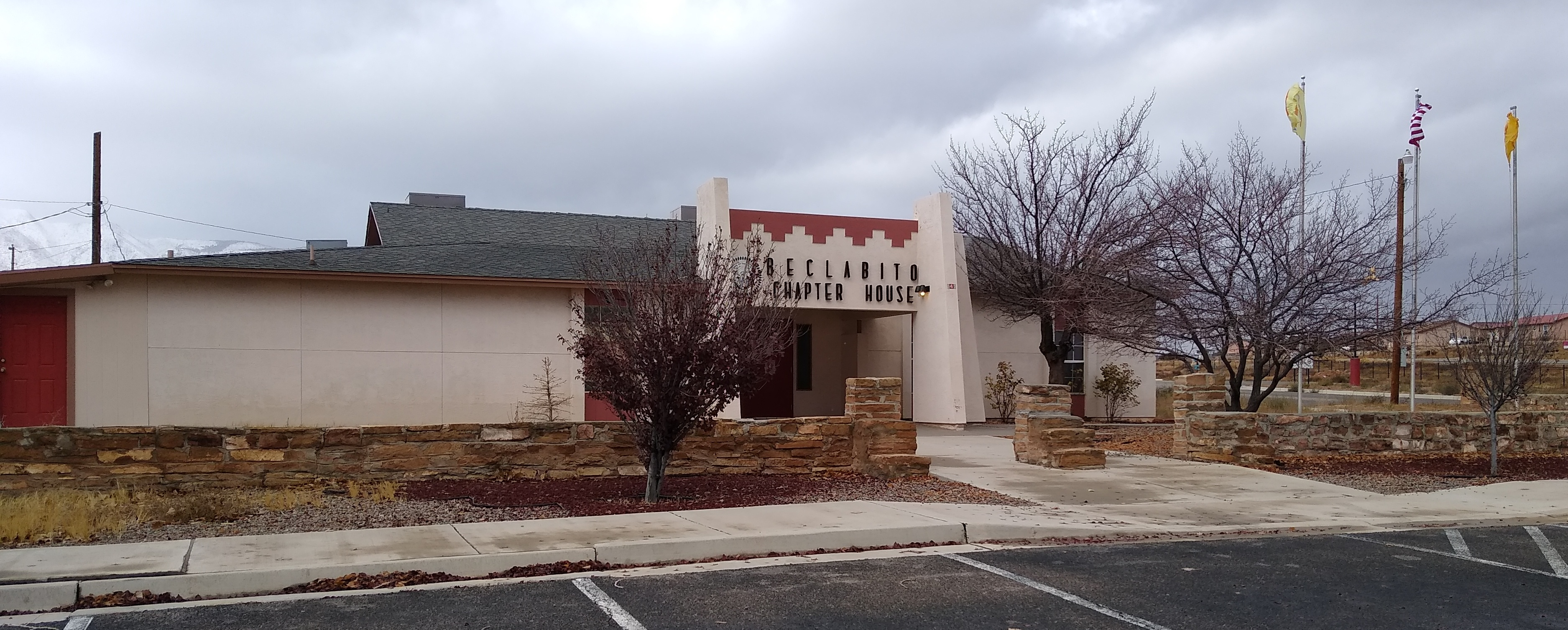
Beclabito Chapter House

== See also ==
- List of census-designated places in New Mexico
