= Mexican Water, Arizona =

Unincorporated community in the United States

- Unincorporated community
- Location within Arizona Location within the United States
- Coordinates: 36°58′01″N 109°38′16″W
- Country: United States
- State: Arizona
- County: Apache
- Elevation: 4,842 ft (1,476 m)
- Time zone: UTC-7 (Mountain (MST))
  - Summer (DST): UTC-6 (MDT)
- Area code: 928
- GNIS feature ID: 24516

Mexican Water is an unincorporated community in Apache County, Arizona, United States. Mexican Water is located on the Navajo Nation 14 miles (23 km) west of Red Mesa. It is also approximately four miles east of Tes Nez Iah along Navajo Route 5056.

== History ==
A trading post was established at this site in 1907 under the name Nokaita. It is believed that the current name came from wells that have since disappeared. On July 1, 1939, a bridge was completed 3 miles (4.8 km) west of the site because erosion had made the river crossing impassable.
