= Sheep Springs, New Mexico =

Sheep Springs, New Mexico Tó Hałtsooí (Navajo)
- CDP
- Location of Sheep Springs, New Mexico

- Location in the United States
- Coordinates: 36°09′33″N 108°41′26″W
- Country: United States
- State: New Mexico
- County: San Juan

Area
  - Total: 5.13 sq mi (13.28 km^{2})
  - Land: 5.13 sq mi (13.28 km^{2})
  - Water: 0 sq mi (0.00 km^{2})
- Elevation: 5,775 ft (1,760 m)

Population (2020)
  - Total: 262
  - Density: 51.1/sq mi (19.74/km^{2})
- Time zone: UTC-7 (Mountain (MST))
  - Summer (DST): UTC-6 (MDT)
- ZIP code: 87364
- Area code: 505
- FIPS code: 35-72600
- GNIS feature ID: 2408723

Sheep Springs (Navajo: Tó Hałtsooí) is a census-designated place (CDP) in San Juan County, New Mexico, United States. As of the 2020 census, Sheep Springs had a population of 262. It is part of the Farmington Metropolitan Statistical Area.

== Geography ==
According to the United States Census Bureau, the CDP has a total area of 5.9 square miles (15 km^{2}), all land.

== Demographics ==
Historical population
| Census | Pop. | Note | %± |
|---|---|---|---|
| 2020 | 262 | | — |
U.S. Decennial Census

As of the census of 2000, there were 237 people, 57 households, and 49 families residing in the CDP. The population density was 39.9 inhabitants per square mile (15.4/km^{2}). There were 71 housing units at an average density of 11.9 per square mile (4.6/km^{2}). The racial makeup of the CDP was 96.20% Native American, 1.27% White, 1.69% from other races, and 0.84% from two or more races. Hispanic or Latino of any race were 2.95% of the population.

There were 57 households, out of which 63.2% had children under the age of 18 living with them, 42.1% were married couples living together, 40.4% had a female householder with no husband present, and 12.3% were non-families. 7.0% of all households were made up of individuals, and 3.5% had someone living alone who was 65 years of age or older. The average household size was 4.16 and the average family size was 4.34.

In the CDP, the population was spread out, with 49.8% under the age of 18, 9.7% from 18 to 24, 26.2% from 25 to 44, 8.0% from 45 to 64, and 6.3% who were 65 years of age or older. The median age was 18 years. For every 100 females, there were 106.1 males. For every 100 females age 18 and over, there were 88.9 males.

The median income for a household in the CDP was $11,786, and the median income for a family was $11,429. Males had a median income of $15,750 versus $45,417 for females. The per capita income for the CDP was $4,260. About 67.9% of families and 72.6% of the population were below the poverty line, including 72.2% of those under the age of 18 and 100.0% of those 65 or over.

== Education ==
Central Consolidated Schools serves Sheep Springs as well as other communities in western San Juan County.
