= Pinedale, New Mexico =

Human settlement in McKinley County, New Mexico

Pinedale, New Mexico Tό Bééhwiisgání (Navajo)
- Census-designated place
- Location within New Mexico Location within the United States
- Coordinates: 35°36′14.2″N 108°26′50.8″W
- Country: United States
- State: New Mexico
- County: McKinley
- Established: December 5, 1955

Government
  - Type: Chapter government

Area
  - Total: 10.32 sq mi (26.72 km^{2})
  - Land: 10.31 sq mi (26.70 km^{2})
  - Water: 0.0077 sq mi (0.02 km^{2})
- Elevation: 7,166 ft (2,184 m)

Population (2020)
  - Total: 485
  - Density: 47.0/sq mi (18.16/km^{2})
- FIPS code: 35-57160
- GNIS feature ID: 2806727
- ZIP Code: 87311 (Church Rock)

Pinedale (also spelled Pine Dale; Navajo: Tό Bééhwiisgání) is an unincorporated community and census-designated place (CDP) in McKinley County, New Mexico, United States. As of the 2020 census, it had a population of 485.

== Geography ==
Pinedale is in west-central McKinley County, 14 miles (23 km) by road northeast of Church Rock and 22 miles (35 km) northeast of Gallup, the county seat. It is served by Navajo Route 11.

According to the U.S. Census Bureau, the Pinedale CDP has a total area of 10.32 square miles (26.73 km^{2}), of which 0.006 square miles (0.016 km^{2}), or 0.06%, are water. The community sits at the northern base of Fallen Timber Ridge and is drained by tributaries of the Puerco River, which flows westward through the northern part of the CDP, leading eventually to Gallup and thence to the Little Colorado River in Arizona.

== Demographics ==
Historical population
| Census | Pop. | Note | %± |
|---|---|---|---|
| 2020 | 485 | | — |
U.S. Decennial Census

Pinedale was first listed as a census-designated place prior to the 2020 census.

== Notable people ==
Paddy Martinez, the Navajo man who discovered high-grade uranium ore that initiated the Grants, New Mexico, uranium mining boom, was born in Pinedale.

== Education ==
Pinedale Chapter is served by three local school systems, they are Gallup-McKinley County Public Schools. BIE operated schools Wingate Elementary School, Mariano Lake Community School, and Wingate High School.
