= Chairman of the Navajo Nation =

Chairmen of the Navajo Nation
- Naabeehó Bináhásdzo (Navajo)
- Great Seal of the Navajo Nation

- Flag of the Navajo Nation
- Residence: Window Rock, AZ
- Term length: Four years, no term limits
- Constituting instrument: Navajo Nation Code & Treaty of 1868
- Inaugural holder: Chee Dodge
- Formation: 1923
- Final holder: Leonard Haskie
- Abolished: 1991

The Chairman of the Navajo Nation was the head of the government at the formation of the Tribal Council and the government entity to interact with the Bureau of Indian Affairs. The office was replaced by the President of the Navajo Nation in 1991 during restructuring of the Tribal Government into a three-branch national government.

== Officeholders ==
No.	Chairman		Took office	Left office	Tenure	Party	Election	Vice Chairman
1	Portrait of Chee Dodge	Chee Dodge (c. 1860–1947); 1st time	1923	1928	5 years	Unknown	TBA	Vacant
2	Portrait of Deshna Chischillige	Deshna Chischillige (TBA–TBA)	1928	1932	4 years	Unknown	TBA	Maxwell Yazzie
3	Portrait of Thomas Dodge	Thomas Dodge (1899–1987)	1932	March 30, 1936 (Note: Resigned from office.)	3–4 years	Unknown	TBA	Marcus Kanuho
4	Portrait of Henry Taliman Sr.	Henry Taliman Sr. (TBA–TBA)	1937	1938	1 year	Unknown	TBA	Roy Kinsel
5		Jacob C. Morgan (1879–1950)	1938	1942	4 years	Unknown	TBA	Howard Gorman
6	Portrait of Chee Dodge	Chee Dodge (c. 1860–1947); 2nd time	1942	1946	4 years	Unknown	TBA	Sam Ahkeah
7	Portrait of Sam Ahkeah	Sam Ahkeah (1896–1967)	1946	1954	8 years	Unknown	TBA	Chee Dodge (died before taking office)
7	Portrait of Sam Ahkeah	Sam Ahkeah (1896–1967)	1946	1954	8 years	Unknown	TBA	Zealy Tso (1946–1950)
7	Portrait of Sam Ahkeah	Sam Ahkeah (1896–1967)	1946	1954	8 years	Unknown	TBA	John Claw (1951–1952)
7	Portrait of Sam Ahkeah	Sam Ahkeah (1896–1967)	1946	1954	8 years	Unknown	TBA	Adolph Maloney (1952–1954)
8	Portrait of Paul Jones	Paul Jones (1895–1971)	1955	1963	8 years	Unknown	TBA	Scott Preston
9	Portrait of Raymond Nakai	Raymond Nakai (1918–2005)	1963	1970	7 years	Unknown	TBA	Nelson Damon
10	Portrait of Peter MacDonald	Peter MacDonald (born 1928); 1st time	1971	1982	11 years	Republican	TBA	Wilson Skeet (1971–1979)
10	Portrait of Peter MacDonald	Peter MacDonald (born 1928); 1st time	1971	1982	11 years	Republican	TBA	Frank E. Paul (1979–1982)
11	Portrait of Peterson Zah	Peterson Zah (1937–2023)	1983	1987	4 years	Democratic	TBA	Edward T. Begay
12	Portrait of Peter MacDonald	Peter MacDonald (born 1928); 2nd time	1987	1989	2 years	Republican	TBA	Johnny R. Thompson
–		Leonard Haskie (1944–2015); Interim	1989	1991	2 years	Unknown	–	Irvin Billy
Office abolished, replaced by President of the Navajo Nation.

== See also ==
- President of the Navajo Nation
- Vice President of the Navajo Nation
- Speaker of the Navajo Nation Council
