= Anselm Weber =

American Franciscan missionary (1862–1921)

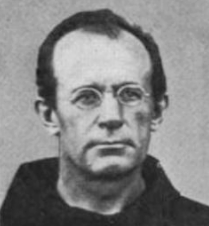
Father Anselm Weber

Father Anselm Weber (1862–1921), O.F.M., was an American Franciscan priest and missionary. He was one of the first friars to arrive at St. Michael's Mission in Navajo territory and acted as the longest-serving Father Superior of the mission from 1900 until his death in 1921.

== Early life ==
Anselm Weber was born Anton Weber on November 10, 1862, at New Salem, Michigan. He studied as a child with Father W.A. Tilik in his hometown and eventually attended St. Francis College in Cincinnati, Ohio. Weber entered the Franciscan order as a novice on August 24, 1882, upon which his name was changed to Anselm. He was ordained by the Archbishop Elder of Cincinnati on December 28, 1889, and began teaching as a professor at St. Francis College. His health began to fail and in 1898 he was sent to St. Michael's Mission in Navajo territory in the hope that the Arizona climate would help him regain his health.

== St. Michael's Mission: 1898–1921 ==
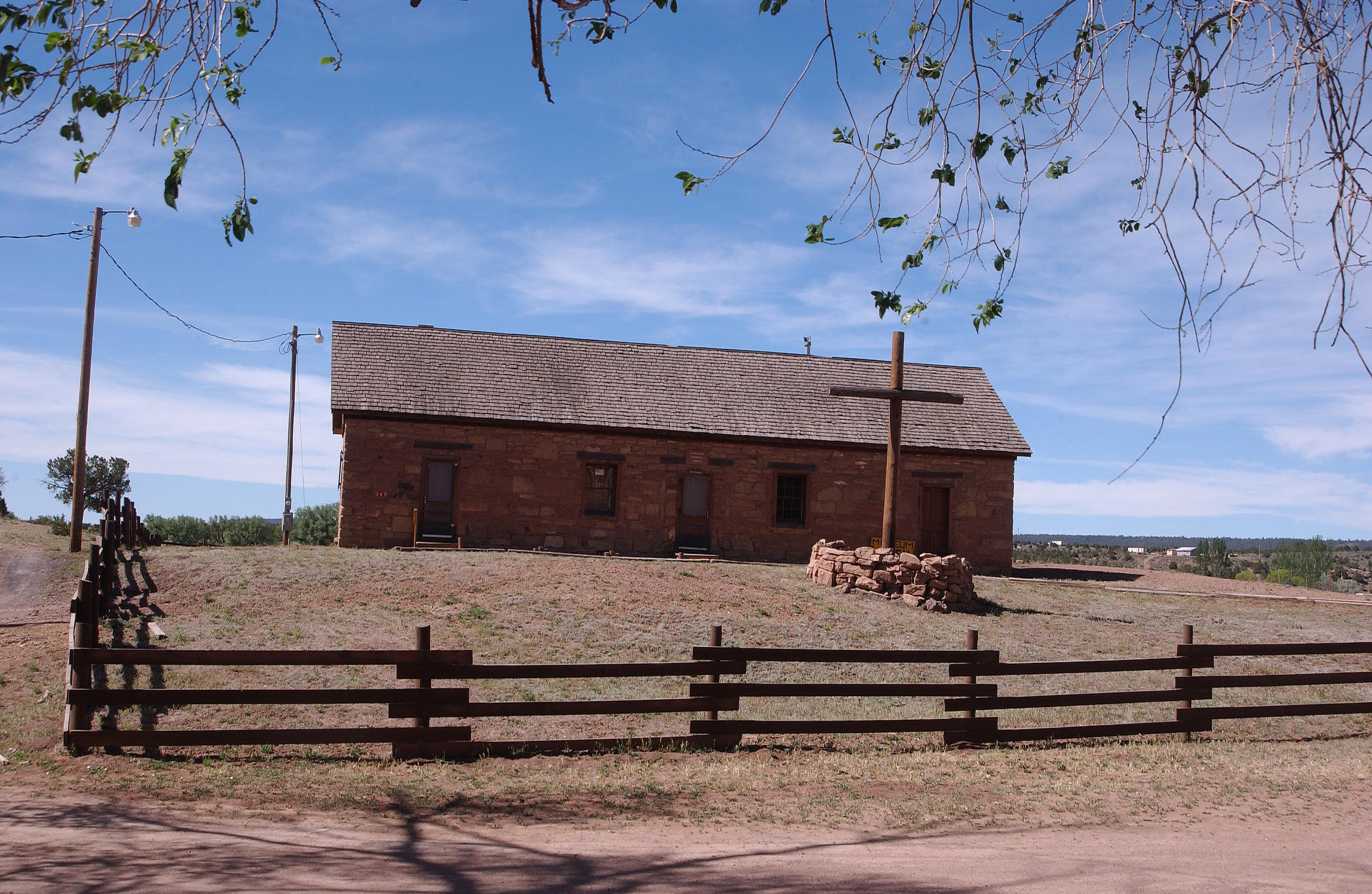
St. Michael's Mission, where Anselm Weber spent a large portion of his life as the Father Superior from 1900 to 1921

St. Michael's Mission was the first Catholic mission to the Navajo in almost 150 years. The first mission was founded in 1627 by Franciscan Father Alonso de Benavides in a Tewa village called Santa Clara near the Rio Grande River. This was soon abandoned, and although there were other attempts to found Catholic Missions on Navajo land over the next century, the last such mission was abandoned in 1750. In 1896, with funds obtained from Mother Katharine Drexel, the Bureau of Catholic Indian Missions purchased land near Fort Defiance in Arizona in order to build St. Michael's Mission. They invited the Franciscans to send friars to staff the mission, and the first three to arrive were Father Anselm Weber, Father Juvenal Schnorbus, and Brother Placidus Buerger in October 1898. When Father Juvenal left the mission in 1900, Father Anselm became the Father Superior at St. Michael's, and would remain so until his death.

During his time at St. Michael's, Anselm Weber witnessed and participated in the mission's growth and interaction with the Navajo Nation. In 1903, the friars created a branch of the mission in Chin Lee, and in 1910 they created another branch in Lukachukai. During this time period, Weber concentrated on building relationships with Navajo leaders, establishing a boarding school, and translating Catholic materials into Navajo. He traveled often and widely throughout the area, and was able to form friendly relations with Navajo leaders such as Charlie Tso and Henry "Chee" Dodge who helped him gain support among the Navajo for the school. This boarding school, which was staffed by Mother Katharine Drexel's order of nuns, was opened on December 3, 1902, with 57 pupils attending. While it was met with some resistance from Navajo parents at first, and the number of students fluctuated through the years, the school expanded to 250 pupils by 1948.

Weber never became as well-versed in the Navajo language as Father Berard Haile, but he, like his fellow priests at St. Michael's mission, emphasized the importance of Catholic missionaries learning Navajo in order to preach and communicate in the common language of the area. They believed that it was easier and more practical for the priests to learn Navajo and translate Catholicism into Navajo than to try to force English on the community. They also relied on the help of other Navajo religious leaders to translate Catholic religious ideas into more recognizable Navajo words.

Because he was on friendly terms with both Navajo and US government leaders, Weber occasionally acted as a mediator between them. One example of this was his involvement in the Beautiful Mountain disturbance in 1913. When US agents arrested some Navajo women for polygamy, the women's husbands and families retaliated in what eventually turned into a skirmish with federal agents. As the situation between the Navajo and federal agents became increasingly tense, they both used Father Weber as a messenger and mediator. Eventually, Weber helped both groups meet and reach a compromise that prevented the situation from descending into all-out violence.

Weber was also present during the Navajo influenza epidemic of 1918–1920. While he never caught the disease, he and Berard Haile went to different areas of the Navajo reservation to give last rites to Catholic members and assist priests who had become ill. Weber also imposed a quarantine on the school at St. Michael's which prevented any of the students there from catching the flu.

Weber was most active in helping secure land rights for the Navajo from the US government. His involvement in finding land for St. Michael's mission in the early 1900s helped him gain a greater understanding of land law which he then used to lobby for more acres for the Navajo. In 1914 he wrote a pamphlet called The Navajo Indians: A Statement of Facts as a counterargument to those who argued that Navajo landholdings were too large and could be sold. He also accompanied various delegations to Washington D.C. to argue for land rights, petitioned surveyors who visited the reservation, and contacted railroad companies to obtain land. He wrote letters to railway company representatives, national government representatives, and other entities throughout his entire time at St. Michael's to help the Navajo avoid exploitation by prospectors and regain their land. By Weber's estimate, he was involved in the acquisition of 1.5 million acres for the Navajo. He continued working to secure land nearly up to his death, writing letters petitioning for land only a few days before he actually died.

== Death ==
Anselm Weber was diagnosed with kidney cancer in 1917. He remained at the Navajo reservation, but did go to hospitals for treatment and eventually had one kidney removed. His condition worsened until he was forced to remain at the Mayo Clinic in Rochester, Minnesota. He died there on March 8, 1921.

== After death ==
Catholic priests, Native Americans, and other dignitaries sent their condolences for Anselm Weber's funeral. Indian Commissioner Cato Sells wrote: "I share with you and your associates at St. Michaels deep sorrow because of the passing of Father Weber. He wielded a large Christian influence and was a tried and true friend of the Navajo Indian." Father Mandalari, a Jesuit in Albuquerque wrote: "The Church lost an apostolic missionary, and we priests and religious a comfort, a leader, a real friend. ...I cannot forget a Franciscan Father, whose friendship has done me so much spiritual good." And Pablo Abeita from the Isleta Pueblo wrote:

We the Indians of the West, have lost a friend, a friend whom one and all liked and loved. It is a loss that will take years to fill, if it is ever filled. ...Others may take his place and do what Father Weber did and more, but it will take years and years to open the Indians' confidence in their hearts, same as they had for Father Weber."

Anselm Weber was buried in St. Mary's Cemetery in St. Bernard, Ohio. His colleagues Fathers Berard Haile, Marcellus Troester, and Leopold Ostermann remained at St. Michael's, with Troester succeeding Weber as Father Superior of the mission.
