= Peterson Zah =

President of the Navajo Nation from 1991 to 1995

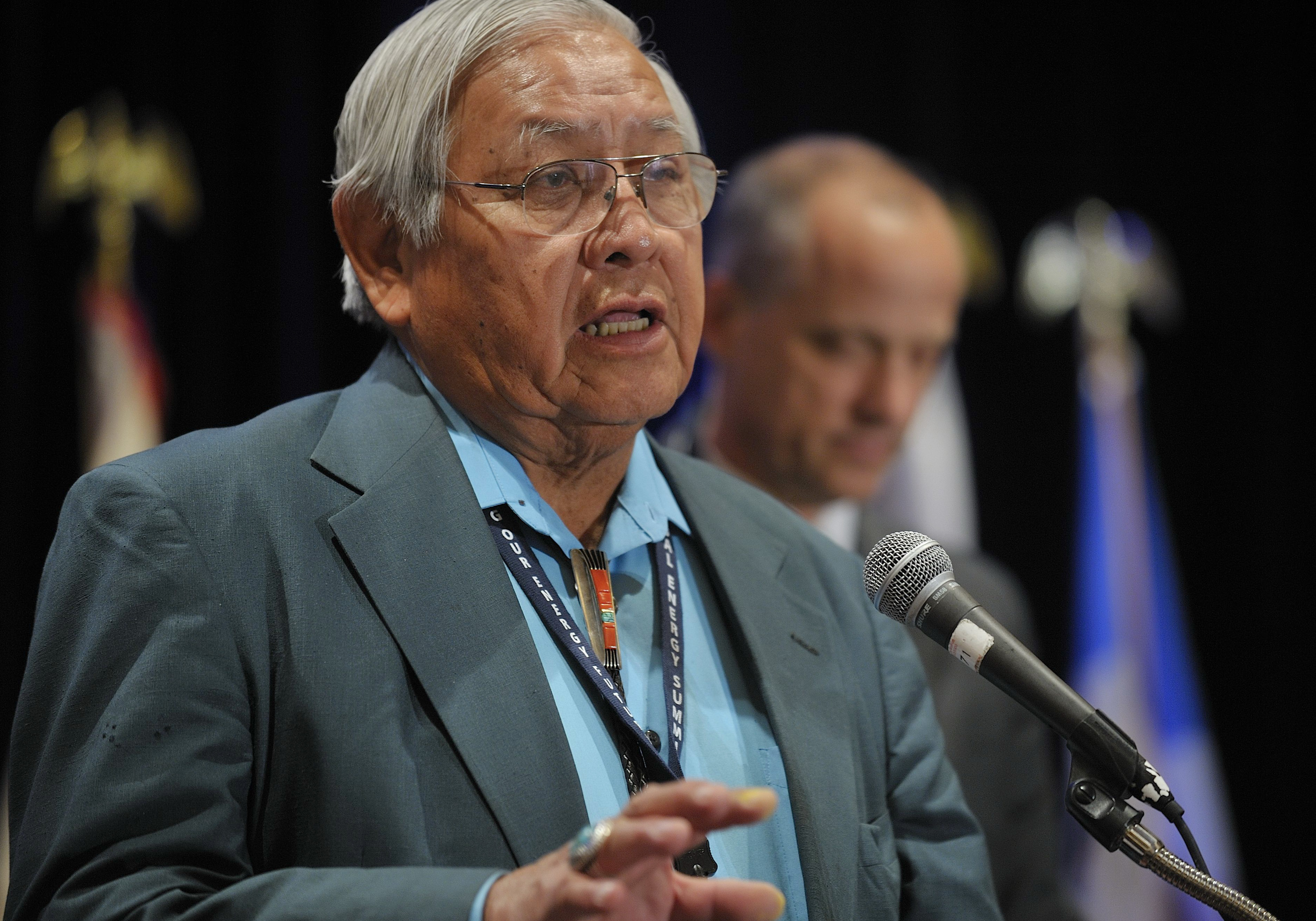
- Zah in 2011

1st President of the Navajo Nation
- In office January 15, 1991 – January 10, 1995
- Vice President: Marshall Plummer
- Preceded by: Position established
- Succeeded by: Albert Hale

11th Chairman of the Navajo Nation
- In office January 15, 1983 – January 10, 1987
- Preceded by: Peter MacDonald
- Succeeded by: Peter MacDonald

Personal details
- Born: December 2, 1937 Low Mountain, Arizona, U.S.
- Died: March 7, 2023 (aged 85) Fort Defiance, Arizona, U.S.
- Party: Democratic
- Spouse: Rosalind Zah (1963–)
- Education: Arizona State University, Tempe (BA)

Peterson Zah (December 2, 1937 – March 7, 2023) was an American politician who held several offices with the Navajo Nation. From 1983 to 1987, he was chairman of the Navajo Nation, its then head of government. At its 1991 restructuring, he became the first president of the Navajo Nation, until 1995. He then worked at Arizona State University as special adviser to the president on American Indian Affairs from 1995 to 2011 and consulted for companies willing to work with his nation.

== Biography ==
Peterson Zah was born December 2, 1937, in Low Mountain, Arizona, the son of Henry and Mae Multine Zah. He graduated from Phoenix Indian School in 1958, Phoenix College in 1960, and Arizona State University, where he received a bachelor's degree in education, in 1963. While at ASU he met his wife Rosalind, who was also a student there; they got married in 1963.

After college, Zah spent a year working in Phoenix for the Arizona Vocational Education Department, teaching carpentry to adult students seeking vocational skills. From 1965 to 1967, he was a participant in Volunteers in Service to America, working at Arizona State University as field coordinator of a training center.

In 1967, Zah became deputy director of the Diné beʼiiná Náhiilnaah bee Aghaʼdiitʼaahii (DNA) People's Legal Service, a nonprofit legal organization serving impoverished people of the Navajo, Hopi and Jicarilla Apache reservations that he co-founded. A few years later, he became executive director and remained so until 1981. Under his leadership, several of the organization's legal cases related to Indian sovereignty reached the U.S. Supreme Court.

In 1972, Zah won election to the school board in Window Rock, Arizona; the following year he became board president. In 1982, Zah campaigned against longtime incumbent Peter MacDonald to become Chairman of the Navajo Nation. Zah won, and 1983 he became chairman of the Navajo Tribal Council at Window Rock, the governing body for the Navajo Nation. In 1986, Zah lost reelection to his predecessor, but MacDonald was suspended and indicted before finishing his term.

Zah began fundraising for the Navajo Education and Scholarship Foundation in 1987. In 1989 and 1990 he directed a regional office for Save the Children, and in 1990 was elected the first president of the Navajo Nation. He was inaugurated as president on January 15, 1991.

During his time as Navajo president, Zah worked with Hopi tribal leader and childhood friend Ivan Sidney to resolve issues related to the land dispute between the two tribes. This did not help the Navajo Hopi Joint Use Area situation, and thousands of Navajo were relocated. During Zah's term, he established the Navajo Nation Permanent Trust Fund (NNPTF), utilizing tens of millions of dollars won in a lawsuit against Peabody Coal Company. As of December 2017, the NNPTF had grown to over US$3.2 billion. In 1994, Zah successfully advocated for an amendment to the American Indian Religious Freedom Act allowing the ceremonial use of peyote.

In 1995, Zah was recruited by ASU president Lattie Coor to become a special advisor to the president on American Indian Affairs for Arizona State University. He held the position until 2011, focusing on increasing retention of Native students and success. While he was an advisor, the Native population of the university doubled. Zah received honorary degrees from Colorado College and the College of Santa Fe.

In early 2022, Zah was recognized with the 2021 Grand Canyon Trust Lifetime Achievement Award.

Zah died of cancer on March 7, 2023, at Fort Defiance Hospital in Fort Defiance, Arizona, at age 85.

Political offices
New office	President of the Navajo Nation; 1991–1995	Succeeded by Albert Hale
