= American Indian Federation =

American political organization

The American Indian Federation (AIF) was a political organization that served as "the major voice of Native American criticism of federal Indian policies during the New Deal", specifically from 1934 through the mid-1940s. The AIF was an early Native American effort to influence national policies, and attracted harsh criticism for its affiliation with several extremist groups.

Historian Laurence Hauptman described the AIF as a complex group with three shared principles: "that Commissioner of Indian Affairs John Collier be removed from office; that the Indian Reorganization Act be overturned, and most importantly, that the Bureau of Indian Affairs (BIA) be abolished". On other questions, AIF members had diverse opinions, most notably on the issue of assimilation. AIF President Joseph Bruner, for example, argued for the complete integration of Indians into white society, while one of its strongest writers believed in Indian cultural separation and sovereignty.

== Founding ==
The group was officially founded in Gallup, New Mexico, on August 28, 1934, where organizers drafted a preamble, elected Joseph Bruner president, and passed a resolution calling for Collier's removal. The group also had conventions in Lewiston (Idaho), San Diego, Salt Lake City, and Tulsa. The AIF testified before United States Congressional committees about alleged violations of law by the BIA.

The AIF was composed of members from several other Indian organizations, including the Indian National Confederacy of Oklahoma, the Mission Indian Federation of California, the Intertribal Committee for the Fundamental Advancement of the American Indian, and the Black Hills Treaty Council. Members came from several tribes, including Navajo, Cherokee, Sioux, Iroquois, California, and Lumbee. Prominent members included Alice Lee Jemison, a Seneca journalist and activist; Rupert Costo, a Cahuilla leader and editor of the periodicals Wassaja and Indian Historian, Fred Bauer, Vice-Chief of the Eastern Band of Cherokee Indians, Elwood Towner, a Hupa attorney, and J. C. Morgan, a missionary for the Christian Reformed Church.

== Efforts ==
In its early years, several members of Congress critical of the BIA encouraged the AIF, including Representatives Alfred Beiter, Virginia Jenckes, Usher L. Burdick, John S. McGroarty, and Senator Burton K. Wheeler.

The AIF received national attention quickly because of its red-baiting accusations against the BIA and the Department of the Interior, accusing commissioner John Collier and his supporters of being atheist, communist, and supported by the ACLU. Some AIF members also made public anti-Black and antisemitic comments, and other groups such as the Daughters of the American Revolution and the Silver Shirts of America used the AIF to advance their own causes. In 1938, the Federal Bureau of Investigation put AIF leaders under surveillance, but concluded the AIF was not a subversive organization.

== Decline ==
The AIF ultimately failed to achieve any of the three objectives that unified its members. In April 1939, organization members who valued Indian sovereignty, including Alice Lee Jemison, were infuriated by AIF support for a proposed "Settlement Bill" that would have provided $3,000 to each Native American to settle all Indian claims against the U.S. Some 4,664 AIF members from 34 Indian nations had agreed to this financial arrangement.

After Jemison left the AIF in 1939, the group "was never able to generate the same media attention and quickly lost influence". The AIF continued to exist on paper through 1945, but had lost much of its national support: by 1945, only five of its nineteen leaders lived outside of Oklahoma.

== Sources ==
- Hauptman, Laurence M. (November 1983). "The American Indian Federation and the Indian New Deal: A Reinterpretation". Pacific Historical Review. 52 (4): 398. doi:10.2307/3639073. JSTOR 3639073.
- Rosier, Paul C. (2009). Serving Their Country: American Indian Politics and Patriotism in the Twentieth Century. Harvard University Press. pp. 73ff. ISBN 9780674054523.
