= Aníbal Buitrón Cháves =

Ecuadorian anthropologist

Aníbal Buitrón Cháves (January 22, 1914 – July 28, 2001) was Ecuador’s first professionally trained anthropologist, earning a Master's degree at the University of Chicago in 1950. He conducted ethnographic studies of rural communities in Ecuador, then worked in community development and adult literacy in both Latin America and Africa, first for the Pan-American Union and then UNESCO.

He was awarded a Latin American and Caribbean Guggenheim Fellowship in 1949. He collaborated with John Collier Jr. in Otavalo, Ecuador and they published The Awakening Valley.

== Early life ==
Born in Otavalo, Ecuador, Aníbal completed elementary school in Otavalo and then obtained a scholarship to attend high school in Quito. In 1936 he graduated from the Normal School Juan Montalvo in Quito, with the degree of professor normalista. Aníbal attended the Universidad Central in Quito, completing his degree with majors in both history and geography. In 1941 he was asked to assist American anthropologists Donald Collier and John Mura in an archeological survey of Ecuador. As a result of this expedition, the University of Chicago offered Aníbal a scholarship to study anthropology in 1942. In December, 1944, Aníbal married a fellow graduate student in anthropology, Barbara Salisbury. He received his Master’s degree in 1950. Aníbal and Barbara had three children, Diana, David and Deborah. Throughout his career, Barbara assisted with his research, as well as translating several of his works into English.

== Career and professional development ==
In 1945 Aníbal and Barbara began a year-long ethnographic study of Quiroga, a small town in the Ecuadorean highlands. Following this research Aníbal worked for the Instituto Nacional de Prevision Social doing field work for the preparation of reports on the living and working conditions of the campesinos in the provinces of Pichincha and Chimborazo. He helped organize and develop the Instituto Ecuatoriano de Antropologia y Geografia, and as head of the Anthropology division initiated as series of studies of representative rural communities in the highlands and on the coast of Ecuador. He was also a member of the Casa de la Cultura. In 1948 Aníbal took part in a UNESCO sponsored 3-month expedition down the Huallaga River, part of the Amazon Basin in Peru, to investigate the suitability of that region for resettlement of wartime refugees from Europe.

While working on a monograph on the life cycle of the Otavalo Indians, Aníbal also began a collaboration with American photographer John Collier Jr. to illustrate the lives of the Otavalo Indians. This resulted in The Awakening Valley, published by the University of Chicago Press in 1949. The Awakening Valley was published in Spanish as El Valle del Amanecer in 1977 and again in 2001. The town of Otavalo took the name "El Valle del Amanecer” as its slogan and Aníbal became known as Ecuador’s first professional anthropologist.

Aníbal left Ecuador in 1952 to work for the Pan-American Union in Washington, D.C. In 1956 Aníbal was recruited to work for UNESCO. In 1958 he spent 2 1/2 years in Patzcuaro, Mexico as the Deputy Director of the Regional Center for Fundamental Education, training community development workers from throughout Latin America. After leaving Mexico, Aníbal oversaw programs in adult literacy and community development in a variety of countries, both from the headquarters of UNESCO in Paris, France, and also while headquartered in Peru, Kenya, Venezuela and Liberia.

Aníbal retired in 1973 to live in the Monterey Bay area of California. He died on July 28, 2001.

== Bibliography ==
- El Campesino de la provincia de Pichincha with Barbara S. Buitron. 1947. El Instituto Nacional de Previsión, Caja de Seguro, Quito, Ecuador
- Ethnological Survey of the Valley of the Rio Huallaga, Peru. 1948. UNESCO.
- The Awakening Valley, with John Collier. 1949. Chicago: University of Chicago Press.
- Indios, blancos y mestizos en Otavalo, Ecuador, with Barbara S. Buitron. 1952.
- Causo y Efectos del Exodo Rural en Venezuela. 1955. Consejo Interamericano Económico y Social, Union Panamericana, Washington, D.C.
- Las inmigraciones en Venezuela: sus efectos económicos y sociales. 1956. Union Panamericana, Washington, D.C.
- El Bienestar Rural en el Ecuador. 1958. America Indigena, Vol. 18, #4.
- Problemas Economico-sociales de la Educación en America Latina. 1960. America Indigena, Vol. 20, #3.
- Taita Imababura: Vida Indígena en los Andes. 1960. Impreso Misión Andino, Quito, Ecuador.
- Panorama de las Aculturación en Otavalo, Ecuador. 1962. America Indígena 22, #4.
- Naturaleza y Función de las Artesanías en las Comunidades Rurales. 1963. America Indígena, Vol. 23, #4.
- El Mejoramiento de la Vivienda Rural. 1964. America Indígena, Vol. 24, #4.
- La Acción Integral y el Desarrollo de las Comunidad. 1965. America Indígena, Vol. 25, #1.
- Como llego el progreso a Huagrapampa: Guía practica para los trabajadores del desarrollo de la comunidad. 1966. Instituto Indigenista Interamericano. Serie Antropología Social 4. Mexico.
- How Progress came to Huagrapampa: An experiment in Community Development. 1966. Agricultural Development Council, New York. Translated from Spanish by Barbara S. Buitron, Illustrations by Diana Buitron.
- Community Development in Latin America: a practical guide for community development workers. 1966. East African Literature Bureau, Kenya Litho Limited, Nairobi. Translated from Spanish by Barbara S. Buitron
- Problemas y Perspectivas de las Educación de Adultos. 1971. America Indígena, Vol. 31, #3
- El Instituto Indigenista Interamericano en sus 30 Años de vida. 1971. America Indígena, Vol. 31, #4
- El Valle del Amanecer, with John Collier. 1971, 2001. Instituto Otavaleño de Antropología.
- Investigaciones sociales en Otavalo. 1974. Instituto Otavaleño de Antropología. Otavalo, Ecuador.
