= Navajo Livestock Reduction =

Forced reduction of animals owned by the Navajos

Navajo Livestock Reduction - showing number of 'sheep units'

The Navajo Livestock Reduction was imposed by the United States government upon the Navajo Nation in the 1930s, during the Great Depression. The reduction of herds was justified by the government by stating that grazing areas were becoming eroded and had deteriorated due to too many animals.

== Background ==
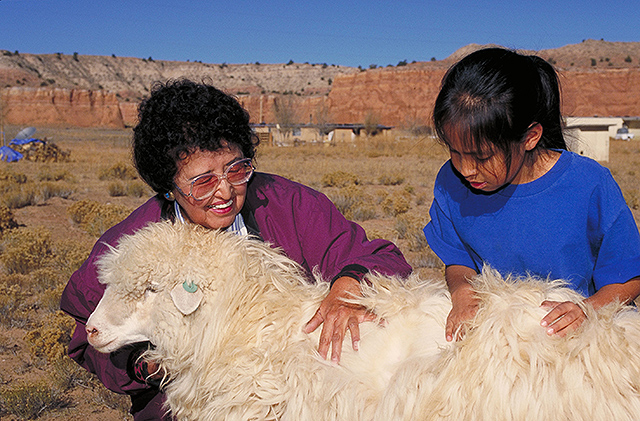
A modern Navajo woman shows the hair of her sheep to a child.

Spanish explorers and colonists had brought sheep and horses to North America and the Southwest for meat, wool, and transport. This was part of the Columbian Exchange, by which products, plants and animals were traded between the hemispheres. By the 18th century, the Navajo had adapted to these new animals, making use of them and developing their own flocks of Navajo-Churro sheep and herds of horses. In the 19th century, the government killed many of the herd animals after defeating the Navajo, whom they forced on the Long Walk and years as prisoners.

The United States government and Navajo signed a treaty in 1868 that returned the Navajo people to their traditional lands. Among the provisions of the treaty was giving each Navajo family two sheep, one male and one female, to start breeding their own herds again.

The Navajo were good shepherds and increased their number of livestock dramatically over the next 60 years. The government authorized increases in the size of their reservation, and stopped raiding and looting of the Navajo by outsiders. The Navajo marketed their wool both as a raw material and woven into Navajo rugs and blankets. The revenues they earned gave them incentives to increase the number of sheep; from 15,000 in the 1870s, the number rose to 500,000 in the 1920s.

In a 1930 report, William Zeh, a forester for the Navajo Reservation, observed there was serious erosion in different parts of the reservation. He suggested a minor reduction in livestock, with an emphasis upon the number of goats. He believed the Navajo way of life was threatened. There was also a drought in the Midwest. By 1933, inappropriate crop cultivation had left the Great Plains susceptible to erosion and dust storms turning it into a Dust Bowl. Thousands of people left the Midwest after their lands literally blew away.

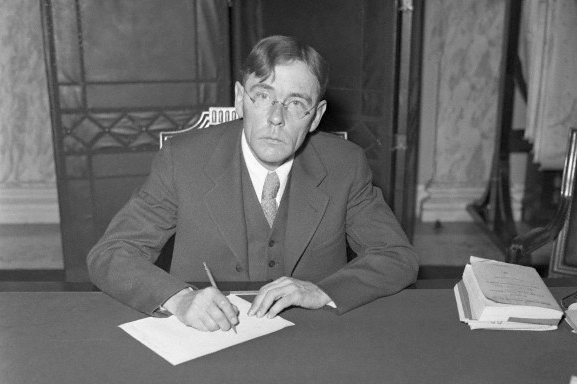
John Collier.

In 1933, President Franklin D. Roosevelt appointed John Collier as Commissioner of what is now called the Bureau of Indian Affairs (BIA). He had studied issues of Native Americans and hoped to improve their lives. Agreeing with Zeh's and other later analysts, he concluded that the Navajo owned far too many livestock for the carrying capacity of their reservation. The capacity for sheep was about 500,000, but the people owned 2 million in 1931; the sheep provided half the cash income for the individual Navajo. Historians such as Lawrence A. Kuznar have noted that the analysis by Washington was quite thin, and dissent with its conclusions was suppressed.

A reduction of livestock was against many Navajo traditions, and destroyed a main source of income. For example, the Navajo considered their livestock sacred and integral to their lives. They were given to them by the Holy People.

== Federal reduction plan ==
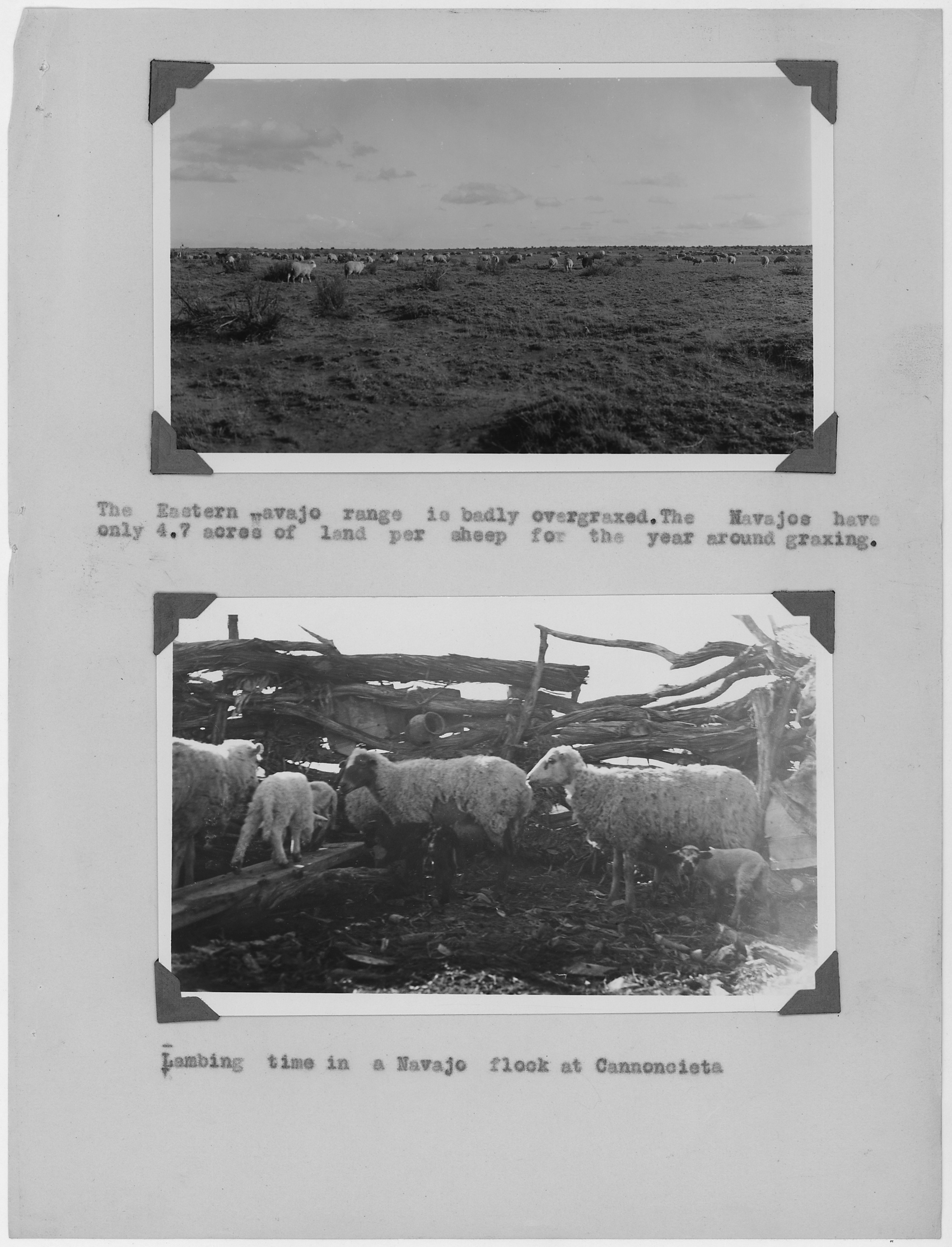
Pictures from a report on overgrazing.

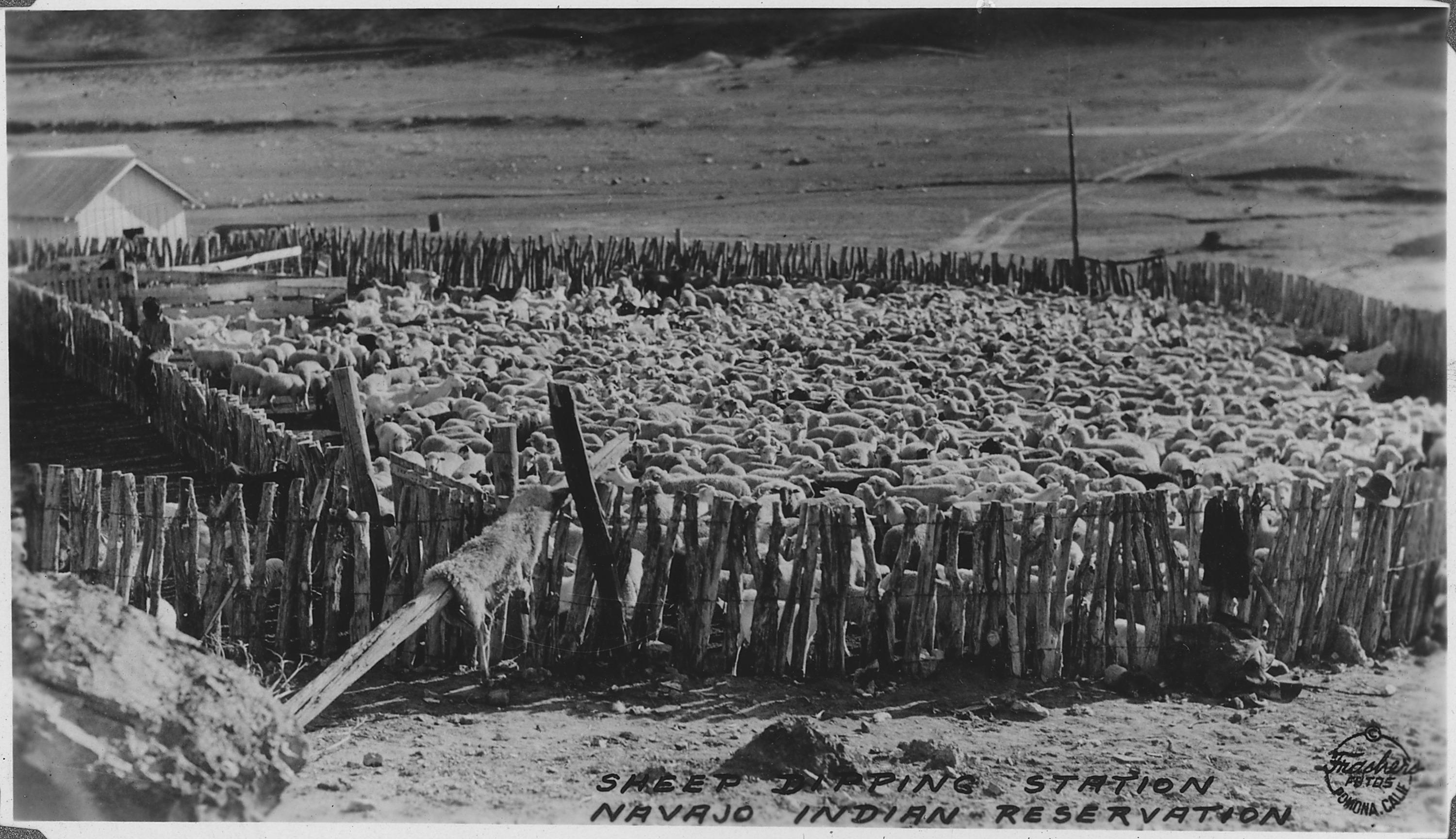
A Navajo corral in the 1930s.

The federal government at first recommended that the numbers of livestock on the reservation be dramatically reduced. The chairman of the Navajo Tribal Council, Thomas Dodge, tried to present the government's arguments to the people. Because of the strong cultural and economic importance of the livestock, he was unable to sway most of the people.

Collier approved a program that resulted in the purchase and removal of more than half of the livestock. Analysts did not understand the deep cultural ties the Navajo had to their herds. Many women suffered economically, often losing their only source of income. The Navajo became united in opposition to the program but, after Collier had opponents arrested, they were unable to stop it.

The Navajo did not agree with this plan. After purchasing animals, the government sent many animals to market or slaughtered them on the reservation. This was a "voluntary" program from 1933, but in 1935 it became mandatory.

The Navajo referred to these events as the Second Long Walk, because they were so destructive to their economy, society and way of life. Historian Brian Dippie notes that the Indian Rights Association denounced Collier as a 'dictator' and accused him of a "near reign of terror" on the Navajo reservation. Dippie adds, "He became an object of 'burning hatred' among the very people whose problems so preoccupied him." The long-term result of livestock reduction was strong Navajo opposition to other elements of Collier's Indian New Deal. He encouraged tribes to re-establish their governments, ended allotment of communal lands, and encouraged revival of Native American cultures.

== Outcomes ==
In the late 1930s, the government established a quota for different types of livestock on specific areas of the reservation. Navajo family grazing ranges were assigned quotas in each area. In the 1950s the Navajo Tribal Government took over administration of the quota system. In 1967 there were 600,000 sheep units. The livestock quota system is still being used today.
