= Chee Dodge =

Navajo leader (1860–1947)

Chee Dodge (Hastiin Adiitsʼaʼii)
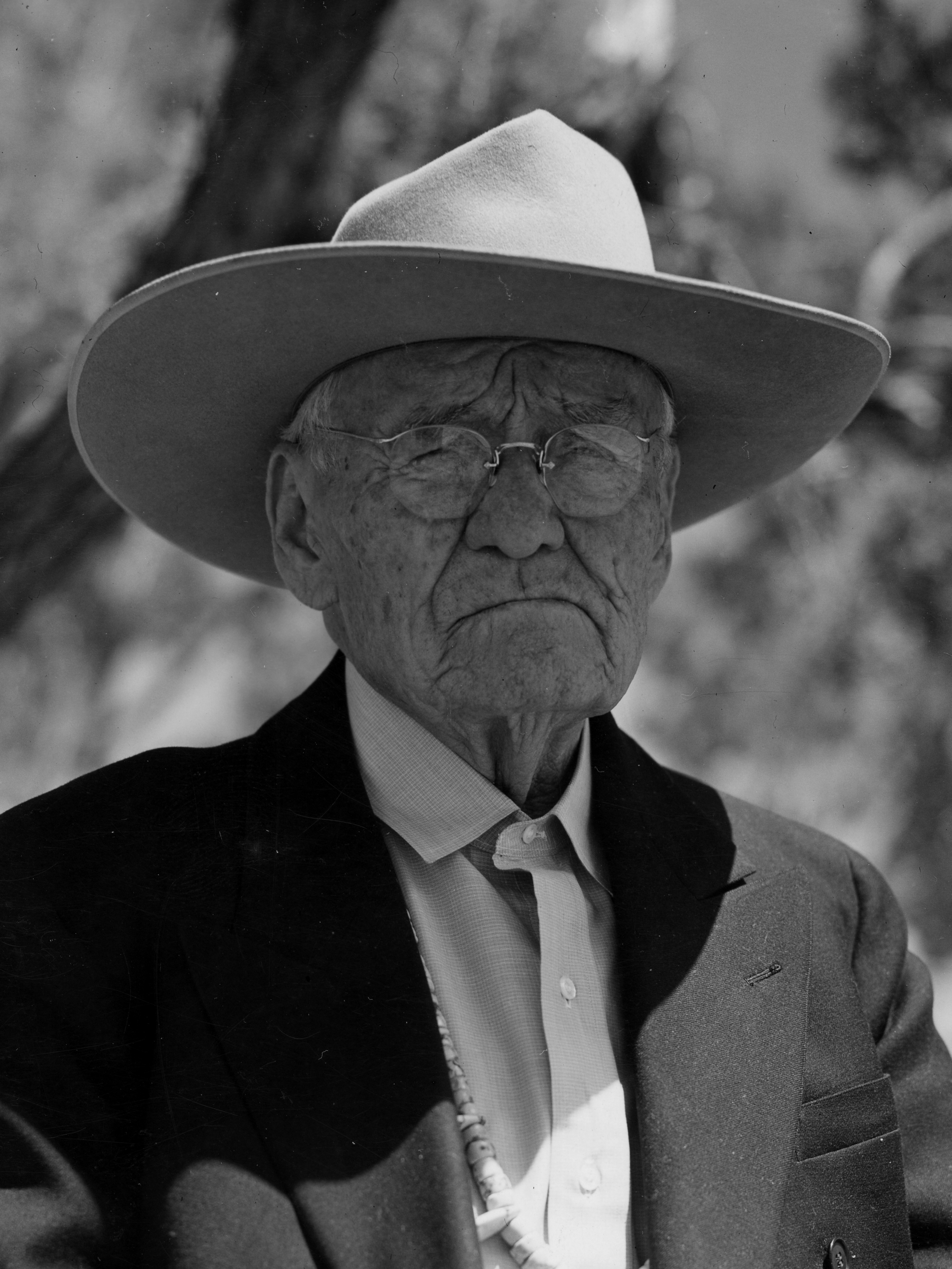
- Dodge in 1946

Last Head Chief of the Navajo Tribe
- In office 1884–1910
- Preceded by: Manuelito
- Succeeded by: position abolished

1st Chairman of the Navajo Business Council
- In office 1922 – 1928 (no vice-chairman appointed)
- Succeeded by: Deshna Chischillige

6th Chairman of the Navajo Tribal Council
- In office 1942 – 1946; Vice-Chairman: Sam Ahkeah
- Preceded by: Jacob C. Morgan
- Succeeded by: Sam Ahkeah

6th Vice Chairman-elect of the Navajo Tribal Council (died before taking office; Zhealy Tso appointed)

Personal details
- Born: ~1860 Fort Defiance, New Mexico Territory
- Died: January 7, 1947 Ganado, Arizona
- Cause of death: pneumonia
- Resting place: Fort Defiance Veterans Cemetery, Fort Defiance, Arizona
- Spouse(s): K'eehabah, Nanabah
- Children: 6, Tom, Ben, Antoinette, Annie, Veronica and Josephine
- Occupation: Interpreter for the U.S. military, Rancher
- Clans: Mąʼii Deeshgiizhnii; Naakaii Dineʼé

Henry Chee Dodge (c. 1860–1947), also known in Navajo by his nicknames Hastiin Adiitsʼaʼii ("Mister Interpreter") and Kiiłchííʼ ("Red Boy"), was the last official Head Chief of the Navajo Tribe from 1884 until 1910, the first Tribal Chairman of the Navajo Business Council from 1922 until 1928, and chairman of the then Navajo Tribal Council from 1942 until 1946. He was the father of Thomas Dodge, who served as Tribal Council chairman from 1932 until 1936, and activist Annie Dodge Wauneka.

== Biography ==
Dodge was born around 1860 near Tsíhootsooí (Fort Defiance) into the Mąʼii Deeshgiizhnii clan; his father was Naakaii Dineʼé (Juan Anaya) of Mexican ancestry, Juan Anaya had been captured by the Navajos on one of their many raids and had been raised by them. There was speculation that he was born three years earlier and was the son of the US Indian Agent Henry L. Dodge at the Navajo Agency. The senior Dodge was known in Navajo as Biʼééʼ Łichííʼ. This question was finally settled by historian David M. Brugge, in an essay titled "Henry Chee Dodge: From the Long Walk to Self Determination," who reported that, in 1875, Augustus C. Dodge, who was Henry L. Dodge's brother, revealed that he had an eighteen-year-old nephew, the son of a Navajo woman and his brother, who lived at Fort Defiance.

During the Long Walk of 1864, Dodge got separated from his mother, and was taken in as an orphan by a family who found him wandering around. He was raised by his aunt. As his step-uncle was Anglo-American, the young Chee quickly became fluent in English. Chee Dodge eventually replaced Jesus Arviso as the official Navajo interpreter to the U.S. military.

In 1883, Dodge was hired as head of the Navajo Tribal Police. A year later, he was appointed "Head Chief of the Navajo" by the Bureau of Indian Affairs – a position and title that had no basis in traditional Navajo concepts of governance. He was presented to the people as "Tʼáá Diné Binaatʼáanii".

Appointed as the first chairman of the Navajo Business Council in 1922, Dodge managed to secure over one million dollars in royalties for the Navajo Nation related to mineral rights on their lands. He gave in to demands to give oil-drilling rights to Anglo-companies. Most Navajo were unaware of the council's functions. Critics said that it was simply to rubber-stamp the decisions of the local Indian commissioner of the Bureau of Indian Affairs.

Under the Indian Citizenship Act of 1924, Dodge and many other members of federally recognized tribes were granted United States citizenship. Prior to that, members of tribes on sovereign reservations were not considered citizens.

In 1942, Dodge was elected as chairman of the Navajo Tribal Council and served until 1946. During his tenure, he lobbied for improved education opportunities for Navajo children, and traveled to Washington to convince the Federal Government to secure more funding.

In the subsequent election of 1946, Dodge was chosen as vice-chairman. He died in January 1947 at the age of 86 or 87 before the sixth Tribal Council convened and he could take office. Zhealy Tso was appointed Vice-Chairman in his stead.

Chee Dodge died in his sleep from complications due to pneumonia on January 7, 1947, in Ganado, Arizona. On January 9 A Requiem Mass was held at the St. Michael's Mission with Father Berard Haile conducting the funeral mass for Dodge.

== Legacy ==
- Chee Dodge Elementary School in Yatahey, New Mexico, and Chee Dodge Boulevard near Gallup are named in Dodge's honor.
