= Alice Lee Jemison =

Native American journalist and activist

- Born: October 9, 1901; Silver Creek, New York, U.S
- Died: March 6, 1964 (aged 62); Washington D.C.
- Other name: Alice Mae Lee Jemison
- Occupations: Native American journalist, activist and political leader
- Spouse: LeVerne Leonard Jemison (1919-1928)
- Children: Son LeVerne "Jimmy" Lee born 1920 and daughter Jeanne Marie Jemison born 1923
- Parent: Daniel A. Lee Elnora E. Seneca

Alice Mae Lee Jemison (October 9, 1901 – March 6, 1964) was a Seneca political activist and journalist. She was a major critic of the Bureau of Indian Affairs (BIA) and the New Deal policies of its commissioner John Collier. She lobbied in support of California, Cherokee, and Sioux peoples during her career, supported by the Seneca Tribal Council. The Franklin D. Roosevelt administration condemned her work, and critics described her harshly in press conferences and before Congressional committees. For a time, she was put under FBI surveillance.

== Personal life ==
Jemison was born on October 9, 1901, in Silver Creek, New York, near the Cattaraugus Reservation. Her mother, Elnora E. Seneca, was from a prominent Seneca family, and her father, Daniel A. Lee, was "a cabinetmaker of Cherokee descent." In 1919, she graduated from Silver Creek High School and married LeVerne Leonard Jamison, a steelworker from the reservation. Jemison had two children: LeVerne L. Jemison, born in 1920, and Jeanne M. Jemison, born in 1923. Her daughter Jeanne went on to become a judge in the Seneca Nation.

Jemison separated from her husband in 1928 because of his chronic alcoholism. In addition to her work in advocacy and journalism, Jemison's responsibility to support her mother and her two children led her to take jobs at various times as a beautician, salesperson, factory worker, clerk, peddler, dressmaker, and theater usher.

== Early career ==
Jemison's early goal was to become an attorney. She worked in the office of Robert Codd Jr., but pursued a different career because she could not afford law school. However, Jemison's social activism often surrounded legal issues, and her background and interest in the law helped her fight for the rights of Native people.

In the early 1930s, Jemison wrote articles for the Buffalo Evening News. She also worked part time for Seneca President Ray Jimerson, where she continued advocating for the rights of Native people. In March 1930, the murder of Colthilde Marchand, wife of sculptor Henri Marchand, was an important case. Local authorities charged two Iroquois women with the crime, including one of Marchand's models, Lila Jimerson, as well as her friend Nancy Bowen. Jemison defended these women when the District Attorney, Guy Moore, called the murder an "Indian" crime and conducted warrantless searches of Seneca and Cayuga homes. Jemison worked with Chief Clinton Rickard and Seneca President Ray Jimerson to appeal the case to political leaders, including U.S. Vice President Charles Curtis. Due to their efforts, the Bureau of Indian Affairs arranged for the U.S. Attorney to help represent the defendants.

During these years, Jemison conducted legal research, wrote newspaper articles, campaigned for the Six Nations' candidate, and lobbied against the Indian Reorganization Act. In 1931, Jemison was the spokesperson for the Seneca when they rejected an offer from New York State officials to settle a longstanding claim on the part of the Cayuga and the Seneca. The settlement would have given the Seneca $75,000 and the Cayuga $247,000, and provided for the right to continue to live on the Seneca reservation.

Jemison moved to Washington, D.C. during the 1930s and began writing for the Washington Star.

== Lobbying against New Deal policies and the Bureau of Indian Affairs ==
Jemison's attacks on BIA Commissioner John Collier centered on his ideas about how Native peoples should govern themselves. She fought for a diversity of Indigenous lifestyles, fighting against Collier's monolithic, romantic notion of primitive people living in pueblos. Jemison's ideas were influenced by the writings of Carlos Montezuma and Montezuma's one-time secretary, Joseph W. Latimer.

In May 1933, Jemison criticized the fact that Collier had appointed Indian Commissioner Rhoades and Assistant Commissioner Scattergood without holding a hearing and without allowing Native representatives to testify on their appointments. She explained that her arguments as follows:

...mainly against the principle of government by a bureau in which Indians have no voice. We believed the Indians were to be given a new deal and dared to raise our voice regarding the man whom we considered best qualified to be our guardian.... Other Indians spoke for other men and some just asked for an open hearing. An open council of all Indians might easily have been called and everyone given an opportunity to speak openly and publicly regarding their wishes. That would have been a new deal.

Jemison and her allies viewed the Indian Reorganization Act of 1934 as a violation of treaty rights and a denial of tribal sovereignty. Following this principle, she also fought the federal government's plans to subject the Seneca to the Selective Service Act of 1940 as U.S. citizens, insisting that such authority belonged to the Iroquois Confederacy.

Jemison also protested when Roosevelt vetoed the Beiter Bill (Note: The Beiter Bill was named for Representative Alfred F. Beiter, a New York Democrat from the Buffalo area. He worked in the Interior Department in 1939–40.) in June 1935, which would have "restored tribal jurisdiction over fishing and hunting on [Seneca] reservations which had been taken away by the government in the Conservation Act of 1927." Jemison considered the Conservation Act of 1927 a violation of the Treaty of Canandaigua (1794).

In November 1938, she testified before the Dies Committee, forerunner of the House Un-American Activities Committee, which was investigating Communist influence in labor unions, foreign relief services, and government agencies. On behalf of the American Indian Federation (AIF), she testified that nine officials of the Bureau of Indian Affairs and its parent, the Interior Department, including Interior Secretary Harold Ickes, were members of the American Civil Liberties Union (ACLU), known to the committee as a Communist front organization. She said the Bureau and the ACLU had engineered the passage of the 1934 Indian Reorganization Act that sought to "restore the Indians to a state of communal bliss with their tribal lands held in common instead of in allotments".

Secretary Ickes called the committee's work "a side show" and Dies an "outstanding zany." He responded to Jemison's allegations by giving the press copies of a letter from an anti-Semitic organization, James True Associates, soliciting funds for the AIF. At the same time, Collier said that the organization Jemison represented was a "trouble-making pro-Nazi racket" trying to engage nationwide Indigenous support for legislation that would enrich only its own members.

Historians note that Jemison's attacks on the Roosevelt administration, Collier, and the Bureau of Indian Affairs were often unfair or could be described as red-baiting. For example, Jemison claimed that Native people were being controlled by a group of federal officials "who have well-known regard for radical activities and association with, or admiration for, atheists, anarchists, communists, and other 'fifth columnists'".

In 1940, six years after the enactment of the Indian Reorganization Act, when Jemison appeared on behalf of the AIF at Congressional hearings, she said the Bureau of Indian Affairs represented "communism and distinctly Russian in variety." Additionally, she claimed that the BIA's plan to compensate Native peoples individually for renouncing land claims "the program of the Christ-mocking, Communist-aiding, subversive and seditious American Civil Liberties Union and its subsidiary, the Progressive Education Association".

When Jemison needed financial support in 1937, she received direct support or payment for reprinting her writings in the publications from several extremist critics of FDR, including the anti-Semites James True and William Dudley Pelley. This later prompted Collier to identify the AIF with Nazi sympathizers.

In January 1939, at a hearing of the Senate Judiciary Committee considering the nomination of Felix Frankfurter to serve on the U.S. Supreme Court, Jemison testified in opposition along with a number of anti-Semitic and nativist witnesses, opponents of the ACLU, and anti-Communist conspiracy theorists. According to The New York Times:

Mrs. Alice Lee Jemison, a Seneca Indian, sobbing and pounding the table, declared that Professor Frankfurter, as a member of the Civil Liberties Union, was at least partly responsible for alleged government attempts to "communize the American Indians."

Its report noted this referred to the 1934 Act, which established tribal deeds because the earlier distribution of allotments had "resulted in the Indians selling much of their land to whites".

== Other political work ==
Jemison defended the rights of the Eastern Band of Cherokee Indians along with Cherokee Vice-Chief Fred Bauer, successfully moving the path of the Blue Ridge Parkway to a less disruptive route. Her efforts to defend South Dakota and California Indians increased the voice for diverse Indian opinions before Congress by bringing Native Americans to testify. She also published a newsletter, The First American, which discussed congressional legislation, violation of Indian civil liberties, the image of the American Indian, the abolishment of the Bureau of Indian Affairs, and the removal of Commissioner Collier.

== Sources ==
- Hauptman, Laurence M. (1981). The Iroquois and the New Deal. Syracuse University Press. ISBN 0-815-62247-3.
- Hauptman, Laurence (2008). Seven Generations of Iroquois Leadership: The Six Nations Since 1800. Syracuse University Press. ISBN 978-0-8156-3165-1.
- Hauptman, Laurence (1979). "Alice Jemison ... Seneca Political Activist". The Indian Historian (Wassaja). 12 (July): 15–22, 60–62.
- Rosier, Paul (2010). Serving Their Country: American Indian Politics and Patriotism in the Twentieth Century. Harvard University Press. ISBN 9780674054523.
- 1940 United States Census, Washington, District of Columbia, digital image, s.v. "Alice Lee Jemison," Ancestry.com.
