= Thomas Dodge =

Native American lawyer and Navajo leader (1899–1987)

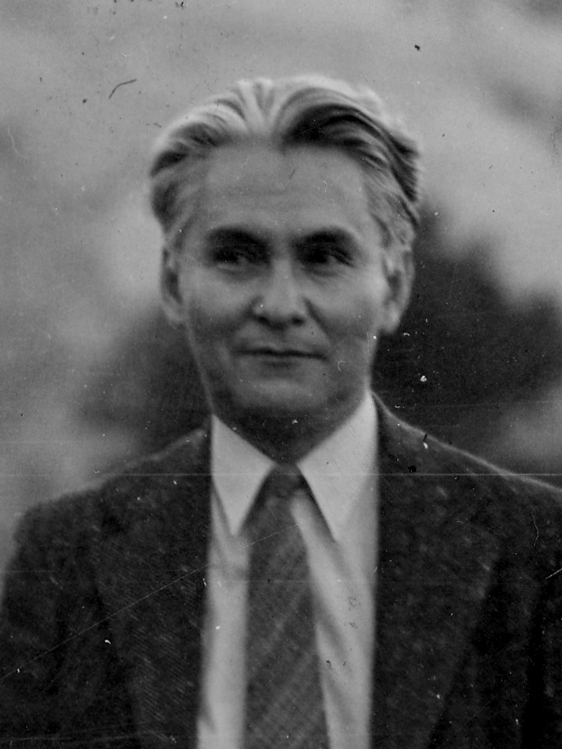
- Dodge in 1938

3rd Chairman of the Navajo Tribal Council
- In office 1932 – March 30, 1936; Vice-Chairman: Marcus Kanuho
- Preceded by: Deshna Chischillige
- Succeeded by: Henry Taliman, Sr.

Personal details
- Born: June 10, 1899 Sonsela Butte, Arizona
- Died: 1987 (aged 87–88) Phoenix, Arizona
- Parent: Henry Chee Dodge Estsan Nez
- Education: Sacred Heart Academy, St. Regis College, St. Louis University
- Occupation: Lawyer
- Awards: Distinguished Service Award of the Department of the Interior

Thomas Henry Dodge (1899–1987) was a Native American lawyer and Navajo leader.

== Biography ==
Dodge was the son of Henry Chee Dodge and half-brother of Annie Dodge Wauneka. He earned a law degree from St. Louis University Law School after which he took up a private practice in Santa Fe, New Mexico.

He was elected to the Navajo Tribal Council in 1933 and served as the chairman of the Council between 1933 and 1936. He presided over the council during introduction of the Navajo Livestock Reduction. Dodge respected the Commissioner of Indian Affairs, John Collier, who was recognized as a strong advocate for Native Americans. In 1933, in advance of initiating the program, the Tribal Council met to discuss the plan. Dodge introduced Collier to the Tribal Council as "the 'Plumed Knight' of the Indian cause". The program was widely opposed by the Navajo people who depended on their livestock for a livelihood. The Navajo also measured their wealth by the size of their herds. In 1935 Dodge was appointed assistant superintendent of the Navajo Agency, a division of the Bureau of Indian Affairs (BIA). This put him in a position between representing the people of the Navajo Nation who opposed the program and the BIA which initiated it.

In May, 1936, he resigned his position as chairman of the council to work exclusively for the BIA. He spent the rest of his life working in various positions for the BIA. In 1965, he was awarded a Distinguished Service Award of the Department of the Interior for his accomplishments during his career with the BIA.

== Legacy ==
Dodge became the first Diné attorney, graduating from the law school at St. Louis University, a private Jesuit college in Missouri. After passing the New Mexico bar examination, Dodge worked for eight years at a law firm in Santa Fe, New Mexico. He was a Catholic.
