= Peter MacDonald (Navajo leader) =

Native American politician (born 1928)

Peter MacDonald Sr.
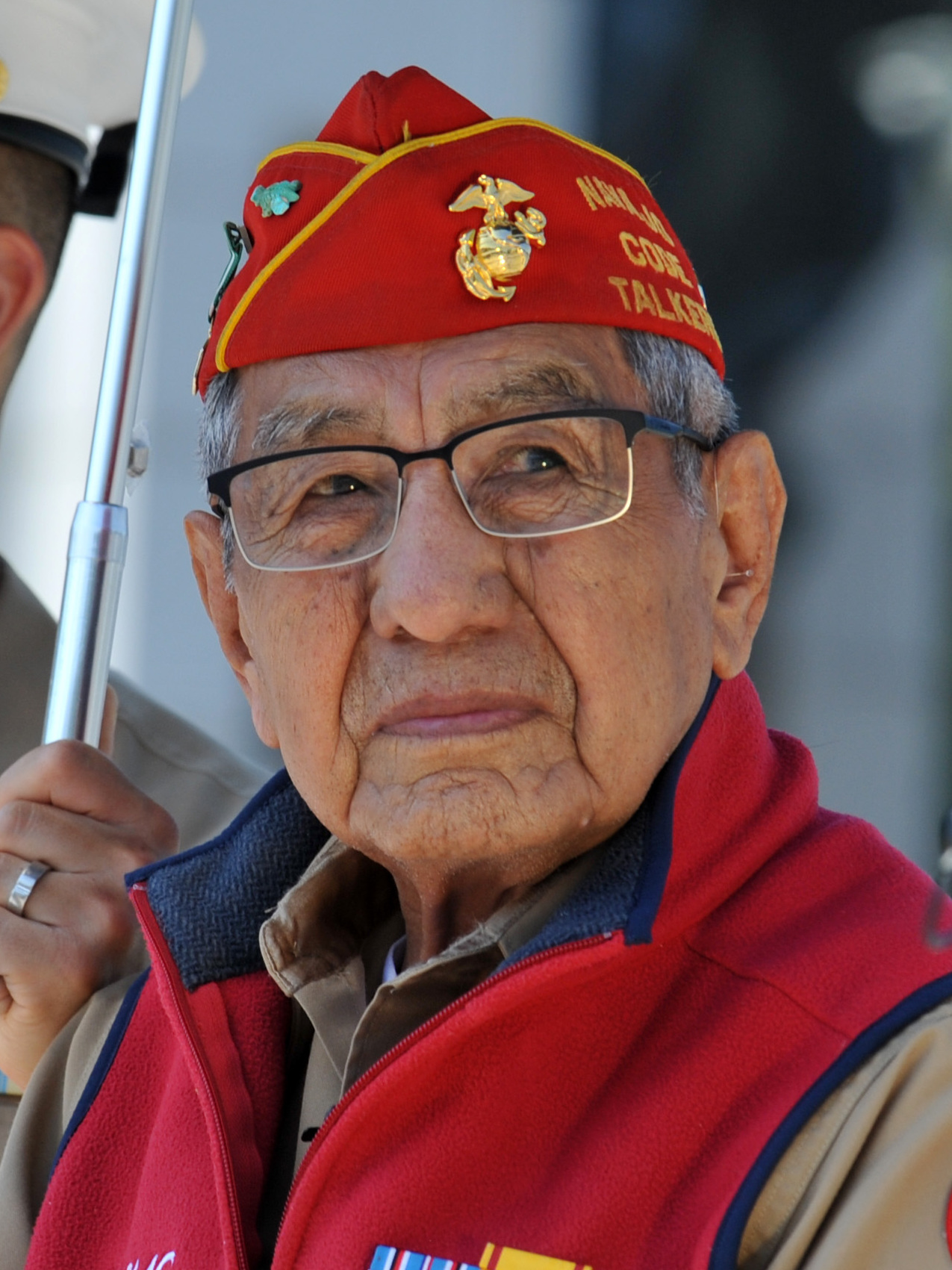
- MacDonald in 2022

Chairman of the Navajo Nation
- In office January 10, 1987 – February 1989
- Vice President: Johnny Thompson
- Preceded by: Peterson Zah
- Succeeded by: Leonard Haskie
- In office January 10, 1971 – January 15, 1983
- Vice President: Wilson Skeet (1971-1979); Frank E. Paul (1979-1982)
- Preceded by: Raymond Nakai
- Succeeded by: Peterson Zah

President of the Navajo Code Talker Association
- In office February 2012 – August 2022

Chairman of the Navajo Code Talkers Museum
- Incumbent
- Assumed office August 2022

Personal details
- Born: Hashkasilt Begay; December 16, 1928 (age 97) Teec Nos Pos, Arizona, United States
- Party: Republican
- Education: Bacone College, University of Oklahoma (BSEE), University of California, Los Angeles
- Occupation: Public speaker, Engineer (formerly)

Military service
- Branch/service: United States Marine Corps; Navajo Code Talkers
- Years of service: 1944–1946
- Rank: Corporal
- Unit: 6th Marine Division
- Battles/wars: World War II: Pacific Theater

Peter MacDonald (born December 16, 1928) is a Native American politician and the only four term Chairman of the Navajo Nation. MacDonald was born in Arizona, U.S. and served the U.S. Marine Corps in World War II as a Navajo Code Talker. He was first elected Navajo Tribal Chairman in 1970.

In 1989, MacDonald was removed from office by the Navajo Tribal Council, pending the results of federal criminal investigations headed by the Bureau of Indian Affairs. MacDonald was sent to federal prison in 1990 for violations of US law and subsequently convicted of more U.S. federal crimes, including fraud, extortion, riot, bribery, and corruption. He was later pardoned.

MacDonald is married to Wanda MacDonald, and has five children with her. He also has nine grandchildren.

== Early life and education ==
Born Hashkasilt Begay (He Who Clasps With Power), MacDonald was raised among traditional shepherds and groomed as a medicine man. He entered the Marine Corps as a Navajo language code talker during World War II. The war ended soon after his training was complete and he was deployed in post-war China to guard surrendered Japanese officers.

After the war, MacDonald earned an electrical engineering degree at the University of Oklahoma. Upon graduation in 1957, his acumen secured a job at the Hughes Aircraft Company, working on the Polaris nuclear missile project. He returned to the Navajo Nation in 1963 and began a career in tribal politics.

== Politics ==
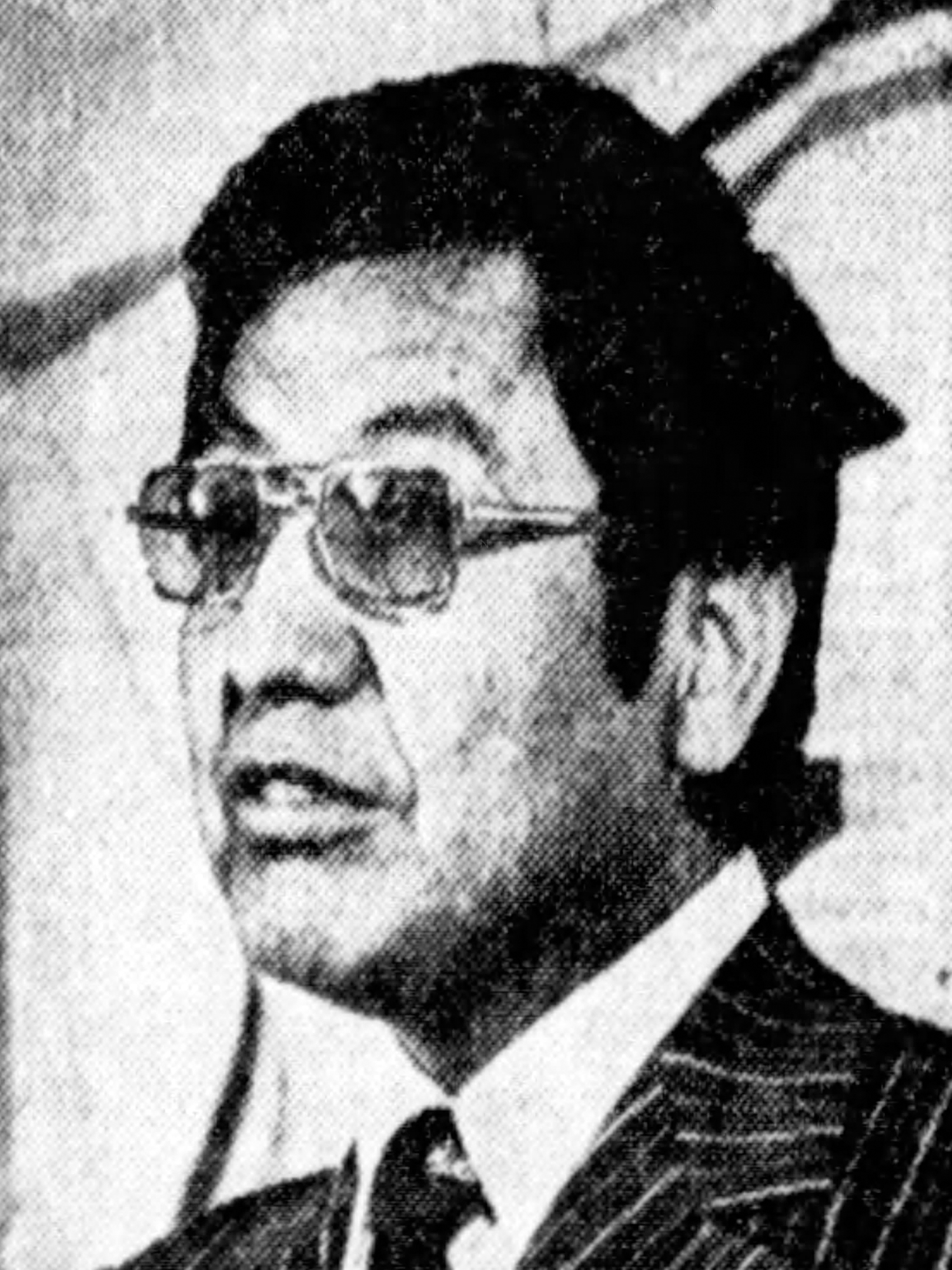
MacDonald while serving as Chairman of the Navajo Nation in 1974

MacDonald served as Navajo Nation Tribal Chairman for four terms between the years 1970 to 1986. During his tenure, MacDonald stressed self-sufficiency and tribal enterprise as key components of his political goals. He worked to extend tribal control over education and over mineral leases and co-founded the Council of Energy Resource Tribes (CERT) in 1975. CERT favored accelerated development of energy resources on tribal lands. MacDonald is credited with starting the Navajo Nation Shopping Centers Enterprise, Navajo Engineering and Construction Authority, and many other Navajo-owned enterprises. MacDonald was critical of the Bureau of Indian Affairs and fought against federal encroachments on Tribal sovereignty.

During the 1972 presidential campaign, MacDonald was referred to as "the most powerful Indian in the USA". He was a member of Richard Nixon's Committee to Re-Elect the President (CRP), and was scheduled, at the urging of Senator Barry Goldwater, to speak at the 1972 Republican National Convention.

Concluding that Nixon's support for the Navajo position in a land dispute with the Hopi was tepid, MacDonald met with Democratic presidential candidate George McGovern, chair of a Senate Subcommittee on Indian Affairs. When McGovern pledged to back the Navajo position, MacDonald considered supporting McGovern's presidential bid. As tribal chairman, he could rally a solid block of votes across the reservation.

Two years later, Goldwater's displeasure increased, when MacDonald delivered 9,006 out of a total 10,274 Navajo votes to help elect Democrat Raul Castro as governor of Arizona.

Goldwater supported the Hopi in the land dispute. In the end, 10,000-15,000 of Navajo families lost their homes, cementing the rift between Arizona's senior senator and the leader of Arizona's largest tribe.

In 1996, Congress passed a law allowing extended families to stay on their lands for seventy-five more years. The Navajos agreed to several restrictions on the economy. "The Bennett Freeze" affecting thousands of MacDonald's Navajo was not lifted until 2009 when US President Barack Obama repealed the "Freeze".

=== Public services ===
American Indian National Bank, Washington, DC: co-Founder and member of the Board. Established the first Native American banking system in the country to serve tribes across the United States and served as the bank director-organizer.

National Tribal Chairman Association, Washington, DC: co-Founder and member of the Executive Board. An organization of elected tribal leaders to speak with one voice (officially) on behalf of their constituents.

Council of Energy Resources Tribes (CERT), Denver, CO: co-Founder and Chairman of the Council. Organized to effect changes in management and protection of Native American energy resources and to receive fair market value for tribal resources.

Navajo Community College Board of Regents; (Diné College); member, Tsaile, AZ

Native American Preparatory School (NAPS) Board of Trustees and co-founder (1986–1988)

American Indian Policy Review Commission, chairman of Task Force on "Reservation and Resource Development and Protection", U.S. Congress (1975–1976)

== Allegations and charges ==
In 1976, US senator Barry Goldwater initiated an audit of tribal finances that led to charges against MacDonald of filing false travel vouchers. MacDonald was acquitted of what some saw as spurious charges, but was forever embittered against the U.S. justice system. Government prosecutor Ken Fields, in retrospect, commented to The New York Times, "I was extremely uncomfortable about that. I've always wondered if we [the prosecutors] were dupes."

On February 17, 1988, a divided Navajo Tribal Council placed Chairman MacDonald on administrative leave. MacDonald refused to step down from his position, leading to a five-month stand-off. By March of that year, the council appointed an interim chairman. MacDonald's remaining supporters, known as "Peter's Patrol", responded by occupying the leader's offices.

In 1990, a Navajo tribal judge ordered Peter MacDonald Sr., after being suspended by the Navajo Council, to face three criminal trials instead of a single trial on 111 criminal counts, raising questions of double jeopardy.

In the third case, MacDonald was charged with violating tribal election law by accepting illegal campaign contributions from non-Navajos. In this case, MacDonald stood trial with Johnny R. Thompson, the suspended Navajo vice-chairman.

Bud Brown, given immunity, testified against MacDonald, alleging that the chairman pressured him into the Big Boquillas deal. He was allowed to keep an estimated US$3 million profit from the land sale and face no jail time.

== Time in prison ==
The Navajo Nation Council suspended MacDonald in February 1989. The council had suspected that MacDonald accepted kickbacks from contractors and corporations. The ensuing political turmoil and unrest over the next five months culminated on 20 July 1989, when a riot broke out in Window Rock, Arizona. During a march in support of MacDonald at tribal headquarters, a group of hundreds of demonstrators stormed the tribe's administration and finance building, where they fought with tribal police officers. Two of the demonstrators, Arnold Begay and Jimmy Dixon, were shot and killed by tribal police, and 11 other people were injured.

MacDonald was eventually convicted of defrauding the Navajo Nation in tribal court, but served only a few months of that sentence before being convicted in federal court of conspiracy to commit burglary and kidnapping charges connected to the Window Rock riot.

MacDonald was convicted on US Federal conspiracy charges for inciting the riot and for taking bribes and kickbacks. MacDonald also served a federal sentence for fraud and racketeering convictions.

In 1990, Peter MacDonald was sent to the Federal Correctional Institution, Fort Worth Texas. Within several years he was convicted of more US federal crimes including fraud, extortion, riot, bribery, and corruption stemming from the Navajo purchase of the Big Boquillas Ranch in Northwestern Arizona. MacDonald was then moved from the general federal prison unit into a prison hospital after experiencing chest pains. MacDonald was imprisoned at the Federal Correctional Institution, Fort Worth, in 1992.

=== Commuted prison sentence ===
The Navajo Tribal Council pardoned MacDonald in 1995 as he was serving his sentence at the Federal Correctional Institution, Fort Worth – noting in their pardon that certain allegations could not possibly have been true and re-establishing the Navajo concept of hozhonji, the Beauty Way, and the need to forgive and ask forgiveness.

The day before President Bill Clinton left office in 2001, U.S. Rep. Patrick J. Kennedy lobbied the White House to commute the sentence of the former leader. President Clinton granted the request, along with dozens of other commutations and pardons.

== Return to Navajoland ==
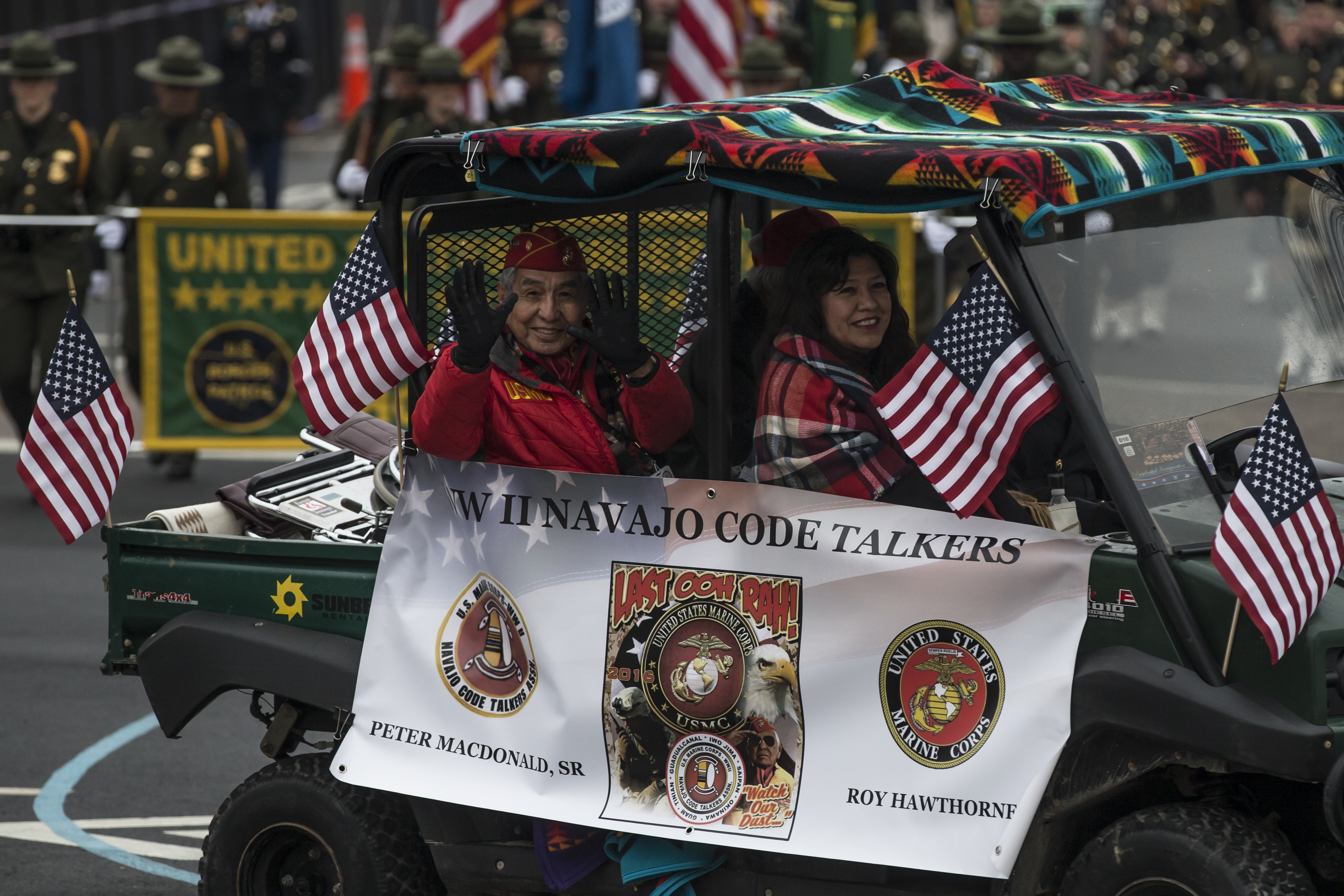
Peter MacDonald during the Presidential Inaugural Parade for Donald Trump, 2017

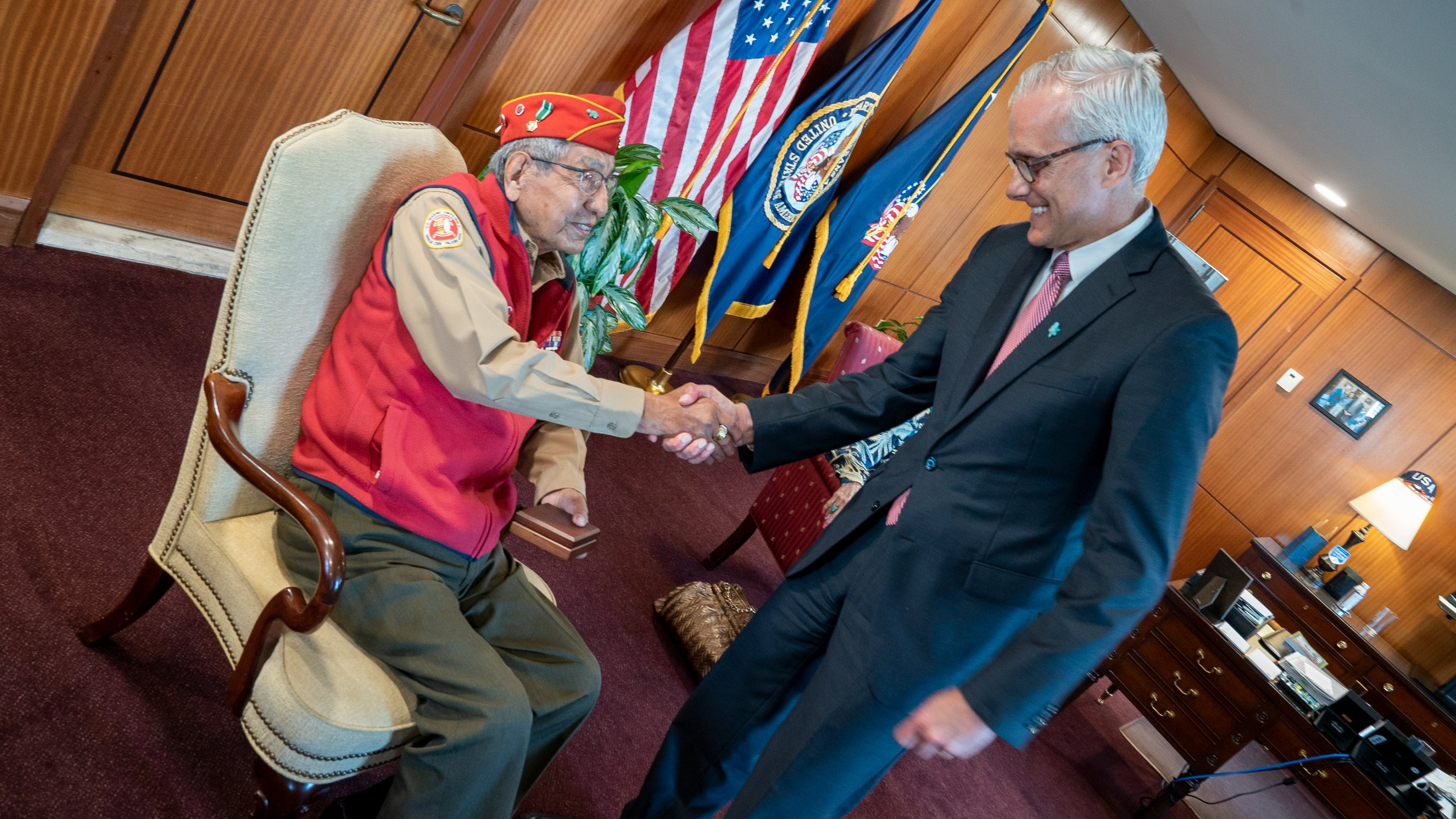
Peter MacDonald at 80th Anniversary of Navajo Code Talkers in Washington, D.C., 2022

Since his return from federal prison, MacDonald has remained a public figure advocating for increased Navajo sovereignty away from federal domains on certain aspects. He continues to speak at conferences, meetings and education venues. He championed a return to traditional Navajo family values, including parents taking back education of their children, in a 2007 address in Tsiizizii:

"I sincerely believe that we will all be better off if we return to the traditional Navajo system in which the family was important and everyone fulfilled their roles and responsibility for preparing our children for life. I have always believed in school and the importance of education. Education is good, it is needed to make a living and to make a difference, but not everyone looked at it this way. Wisdom, knowledge, and strength are the supports necessary to lead a productive life. These supports must work together like the three legs on a stool. The school and the home must work together."

On November 17, 2017, MacDonald, along with Fleming Begaye Sr. (PVT, USMC), Roy Hawthorne (CPL, USMC), Thomas H. Begay (CPL, USMC), Samuel Holiday (PFC, USMC) and Alfred Newman (PFC, USMC) were honored in a White House Ceremony by President Donald Trump. MacDonald introduced his fellow Code Talkers and spoke alongside the president. He highlighted the effectiveness of the Code Talkers' communication in battles and advocated for the preservation of their legacy through the establishment of a national museum. He concluded the speech by emphasizing the unity and resilience of America when faced with challenges, and praised the patriotism of American citizens.

In 2022, he spoke in Washington, D.C. at a celebration honoring Navajo Code Talkers at the National World War II Memorial.

== Publications ==
MacDonald published an autobiography in 1993 called The Last Warrior. It was described by Kirkus Reviews as "interesting" and "perversely fascinating", but MacDonald's account of the allegations against him was not convincing according to the review.

Macdonald's autobiography also describes his involvement with the Navajo Nation during his role as tribal chairman. The Last Warrior goes into depth on the details of his occupational life. Macdonald discusses his early careers in engineering and his journey to becoming eligible for election as tribal chairman.

== Awards ==
- University of Oklahoma Engineering Hall of Fame
- Distinguished Service Citation, University of Oklahoma
- Arizona Indian of the year (1970)
- President Kimble Leadership Award (LDS church)
- Distinguished American Award by National Institute for Economic Development

== See also ==
- 1989 Navajo Nation Council reforms
- List of Native American politicians
