= Malcolm Carr Collier =

American anthropologist

Malcolm Carr Collier (née, Malcolm Carr; 1908–1983) was an American anthropologist remembered for her work with the Navajo. She did field work at Grand Coulee Dam in the U.S. state of Washington in 1936, studied the Navaho in the Pueblo Alto site with Katherine Spencer and Doriane Wooley in 1937, and in 1938, conducted research in the Navajo Mountain area. Her work with Spencer and Wooley, Navaho clans and marriage at Pueblo Alto, was published in 1939. Collier studied at the University of Chicago, and she married the archaeologist, Donald Collier.

== Bibliography ==
- Browman, David L. (1 June 2013). Cultural Negotiations: The Role of Women in the Founding of Americanist Archaeology. U of Nebraska Press. ISBN 978-0-8032-4547-1.
- Weisiger, Marsha; Cronon, William (1 November 2011). Dreaming of sheep in Navajo country. University of Washington Press. ISBN 978-0-295-80319-7.
