= Donald Collier =

American anthropologist (1911 – 1995)

Donald Collier (May 1, 1911 – January 23, 1995) was an American archaeologist, ethnologist, and museologist. He was known primarily for his work in Ecuadorian and Andean archaeology and spent most of his career at the Field Museum of Natural History.

== Family life and education ==
Donald Collier was born in Sparkill, New York to Lucy Wood Collier and John Collier, Sr. His family moved to the San Francisco Bay Area in the early 1920s. He received his undergraduate degree from the University of California, Berkeley in 1933 and completed his Ph.D. in anthropology at the University of Chicago in 1954. Several of Collier’s family members had very noteworthy careers. His grandfather, Charles Collier (1848-1900), was a prominent banker and lawyer in Atlanta and was elected mayor of that city in 1897. His father John Collier, Sr. (1884-1968) was Commissioner for the Bureau of Indian Affairs during the presidency of Franklin D. Roosevelt. His brother John Collier, Jr. (1913-1992) is considered a pioneer in the field of visual anthropology and was also an accomplished photographer. Collier’s brother-in-law Rene d'Harnoncourt (1901-1968) was the director of the Museum of Modern Art from 1949 to 1967 and was the first chairman of the Indian Arts and Crafts Board. Collier married Malcolm Carr Collier (1908-1983) who was also an anthropologist and author. The primary focus of her work was with the Navajo and she served as the director of the Curriculum Study Project of the American Anthropological Association. She and Donald Collier had two sons, Bruce Collier and political scientist David Collier.

== Professional career ==
=== Fieldwork ===
After finishing his undergraduate degree in 1933, Donald Collier became a field assistant with the Museum of Northern Arizona. He performed archaeological survey work at Tsegie and Skeleton Mesa with the First Rainbow Bridge Monument Valley Exhibition. In 1935 he received ethnological field training among the Kiowa with the Laboratory of Anthropology in Santa Fe, New Mexico. His fieldwork in Andean archaeology got its start in 1937 when he worked with Peruvian archaeologist Julio C. Tello at the behest of prominent anthropologist Alfred L. Kroeber with whom Collier studied at UC Berkeley. Collier and Tello did survey and excavation work in Casma Valley in Peru and Collier later returned there for additional archaeological work in 1956.

Following a project on the upper Columbia River in Washington, Collier’s work took him to Ecuador from 1941 to 1942. He worked with John Victor Murra to identify Chavin culture sites. In 1946, he became a part of the Viru Valley Project “a cutting edge cooperative undertaking at the time, the results of which were to have a profound and long-enduring effect on the interpretation of Peruvian prehistory”. The research he did for the project, during which he undertook archaeological survey work with Gordon Willey, served as the basis for his Ph.D. dissertation.

=== Exhibits ===
Collier was the curator of South and Central American archaeology and ethnology at the Field Museum from 1941 to 1976. He was chief curator of the anthropology department from 1964 to 1970 and became curator emeritus in 1976. The first major exhibition Collier helped develop was Indians Before Columbus, a general exhibit on Indians of the Americas with particular emphasis on the eastern United States. Another exhibition Collier worked on was Indian Art of the Americas which was a part of the Festival of the Americas for the third Pan American Games in Chicago in 1959, and for which he authored the catalog.

In 1963, Collier proposed the idea of a temporary exhibits hall to the director of the Field Museum. Completed in 1964, he developed five major exhibits there from 1966 to 1975. The first, Mayan Art: Rubbings from Stone Carvings, involved the first use at the Field Museum of a projector with a synchronized tape lecture. The Festival of American Indian Art exhibit was organized in cooperation with the American Indian Center in Chicago and focused on traditional as well as contemporary Native American art. The exhibit also included artists and craftspeople working in the museum in addition to performances by musicians and dancers. Fiesta Mexicana also included craftspeople, musicians, and dancers. The exhibit focused on colonial and contemporary folk art and included a lecture and film series. The Cuna Art and Life exhibit about the Guna people of Panama included loaned materials from three museums, two art galleries, and six private collections.

Collier’s final exhibit at the Field Museum was Ancient Ecuador: Culture, Clay and Creativity, 3000-300 B.C. Most of the pieces in the exhibition were borrowed from a private collection in Guayaquil, Ecuador and focused on ceramics from Ecuadorian coastal prehistory. Collier co-authored the exhibit catalog with Donald Lathrap and he made sure that the catalog, along with the exhibit labels, would be in both Spanish and English. The exhibition traveled to several cities in the United States before becoming a permanent exhibit at the Museo Arqueologico of the Banco Central del Ecuador in Guayaquil.

=== Teaching, committees, and notable publications ===
From 1950 to 1970, Collier taught classes in anthropology at the University of Chicago. Additionally, from 1945 to 1965, he organized and helped to teach one of the earliest museology courses focusing on museum theory and practice.

Collier was the chairman of the Institute of Andean Research, a founding trustee of the Council on Museum Anthropology, and served as president for the Central States Anthropological Society.

Inspired by the Indians Before Columbus exhibit, a book of the same name was published in 1947 by Collier, Paul Martin, and George Quimby. It was used as a text in anthropology courses and was the only book on North American archaeology for nearly ten years. Collier also wrote forty-eight articles for the Museum Bulletin for the Field Museum. Some of his articles were reprinted in Archaeology, Museum Journal, and the Journal of Biblical Archaeology.

== Selected works ==
- Collier, D. (1942). Archaeology of the upper Columbia region. Seattle: University of Washington Press.
- Collier, D., & Murra, J. (1943). Survey and excavations in southern Ecuador. Chicago: Field Museum of Natural History.
- Martin, P., Quimby, G., & Collier, D. (1947). Indians before Columbus: Twenty thousand years of North American history revealed by archaeology. Chicago: University of Chicago Press.
- Collier, D. (1955). Cultural chronology and change as reflected in the ceramics of the Viru Valley, Peru. Chicago: Chicago Natural History Museum.
- Lathrap, D., Collier, D., & Chandra, H. (1975). Ancient Ecuador--culture, clay and creativity, 3000-300 B.C.: Catalogue of an exhibit organized by the Field Museum of Natural History, April 18-August 5, 1975. Chicago: Field Museum of Natural History.
