= Elwood Towner =

American lawyer and antisemitic speaker

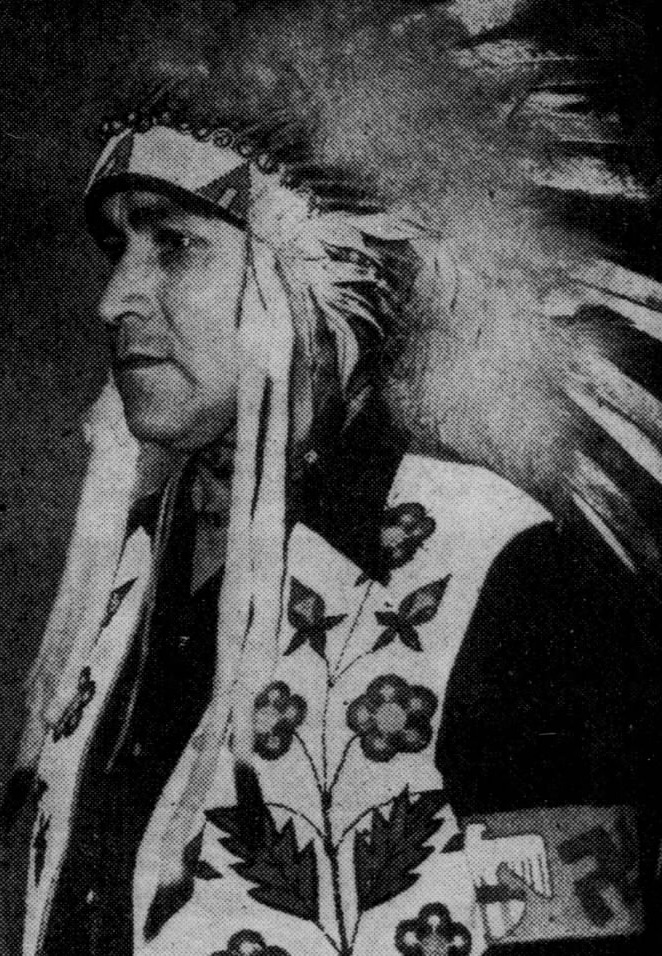
- Towner in 1939
- Born: c. 1897; Siletz Reservation, Lincoln County, Oregon, U.S.
- Died: October 6, 1954 (aged 57); Multnomah, Portland, Oregon, U.S.
- Resting place: Willamette National Cemetery; Portland, Oregon
- Occupations: Attorney, tribal advocate, pro-Nazi speaker
- Years active: 1930s–1940s
- Spouse: Evelyn M. Redpath

Elwood Alfred Towner (c. 1897 – October 6, 1954), who also adopted the title of Chief Red Cloud, was a Hupa attorney, tribal advocate, and antisemitic speaker.

== Early life and education ==
Elwood Alfred Towner was born in 1897, and grew up on the Siletz Reservation in Lincoln County, Oregon. His father was William T. Towner and he had brothers named Louis and Gilbert.

He attended Chemawa Indian School in Salem and graduated from Willamette University College of Law in 1926.

Towner served in the military during World War I.

== Career and political actions ==
[The Indians] are ashamed of every Senator and Congressman who is licking the bootstraps of that Sephardic Jew in the White House, Franklin D. Rosenfeld [...] On our reservations we have in training American Indian Hitlers, super-patriots preparing to drive every Jew out of North and South America.

— Elwood Towner (1939)

Towner worked as an attorney in Portland, Oregon, where he ran his own law firm.

Towner's views on the Indian Reorganization Act (IRA; or Wheeler–Howard Act) shifted throughout the 1930s. At the March 1934 Northwest congress to discuss the initial bill, he was one of the 250 or so tribal members that supported it. After the IRA was signed into law, Siletz tribal members held an election on whether to organize under it: Towner was apparently now opposed to the IRA and was influential in convincing others to vote against its implementation. The Siletz voted against the IRA on April 6, 1935.

At some point in the 1930s, Towner began identifying himself as "Chief Red Cloud" of the Rouge River people. In July 1939, he appeared at a meeting of the Indians of California, Inc., in Eureka on the invitation of its founder Rev. Frederick G. Collett, a White "interloper" who received financial backing from the Nazi-supporting German American Bund to promote himself in Native American communities. At the meeting, Towner emerged from between two American flags wearing an elaborate Native costume and a Nazi armband, accusing the federal government of attempting to promote communism amongst Native Americans through the IRA and the Bureau of Indian Affairs. He handed out pamphlets in support of the German American Bund and promoted antisemitism to the crowd. Towner's pro-Nazi sentiments were rejected by the majority of those he interacted with: fewer Native Americans attended Bund meetings in California as the groups messaging became more blunt and most received some benefit from the IRA's implementation.

== Personal life ==
Towner died on October 6, 1954.
