= John Collier (sociologist) =

American government official (1884–1968)

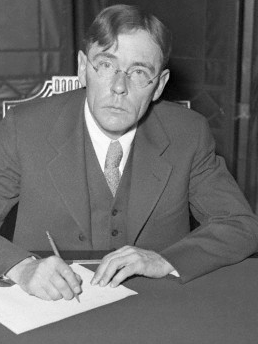

33rd Commissioner of Indian Affairs
- In office 1933–1945
- Preceded by: Charles J. Rhoads
- Succeeded by: William A. Brophy

Personal details
- Born: May 4, 1884 Atlanta, Georgia
- Died: May 8, 1968 (aged 84) Taos, New Mexico
- Resting place: El Descanso Cemetery; 36°21′15.3642″N 105°36′7.76″W
- Children: John Collier Jr., Donald Collier
- Education: Columbia University; Collège de France
- Occupation: Native American Advocate; Public Official; Social Reformer; Sociology Professor

John Collier (May 4, 1884 – May 8, 1968), a sociologist and writer, was an American social reformer and Native American advocate. He served as Commissioner for the Bureau of Indian Affairs in the President Franklin D. Roosevelt administration, from 1933 to 1945. He was chiefly responsible for the "Indian New Deal", especially the Indian Reorganization Act of 1934, through which he intended to reverse a long-standing policy of cultural assimilation of Native Americans.

During the second World War, in part due to his position in the BIA, Collier also became involved with the incarceration of Japanese Americans at the Poston War Relocation Center and desired greater involvement at the Gila River War Relocation Center.

Collier was instrumental in ending the loss of reservations lands held by Indians, and in enabling many tribal nations to re-institute self-government and preserve their traditional culture. Some Indian tribes rejected what they thought was unwarranted outside interference with their own political systems that the new approach had brought them, and Collier's policies led to a wide range of outcomes and reactions.

== Early life and education ==
John Collier was born in 1884 and grew up in Atlanta, Georgia, where his father Charles A. Collier was a prominent banker, businessman, civic leader, and mayor of Atlanta (1897–1899). He had a tragic family life: his mother died of pneumonia and his father died, possibly a suicide, before Collier was sixteen.

He was educated at Columbia University and at the Collège de France in Paris. At Columbia, Collier began to develop a social philosophy that would shape his later work on behalf of American Indians. He was concerned with the adverse effects of the industrial age on mankind. He thought society was becoming too individualistic and argued that American culture needed to reestablish a sense of community and responsibility. He graduated from Columbia in 1906. From 1907 to 1919, he worked as secretary of the People's Institute, where he developed programs for immigrant neighborhoods, emphasizing pride in their traditions, sponsoring lectures and pageants, and political awareness.

Collier centered his career on trying to realize the power of social institutions to make and modify personalities. In 1908, Collier made his first significant contribution to a national magazine; his article describing the socialist municipal government in Milwaukee, Wisconsin was published in Harper's Weekly. Collier moved to California in October 1919.

== Indian advocate (1920–1933) ==
In 1920, Collier was introduced to the Pueblo tribes by the artist Mabel Dodge, at the Taos Pueblo in Taos, New Mexico; for much of that year he studied their history and current life. By the time Collier left Taos in 1921 he believed that Native Americans and their culture were threatened by the encroachment of the dominant white culture and policies directed at their assimilation. Collier's encounter with the Taos Pueblo made a lasting impression on him.

Collier was brought into the forefront of the debate by the General Federation of Women's Clubs (GFWC), when it appointed him the research agent for its Indian Welfare Committee in 1922. The GFWC took a leadership role in opposing assimilation policies, supporting the return of Indian lands, and promoting more religious and economic independence.

Collier rejected the contemporary policies of forced assimilation and Americanization. He worked for the acceptance of cultural pluralism to enable Native American tribes to preserve their own cultures. Collier believed Indigenous survival was based on their retention of their land bases. He lobbied for repeal of the Dawes Act, also known as the Indian General Allotment Act of 1887. It had been directed at Indigenous assimilation by subdividing Indian reservation land into individual household parcels of private property. Some communal lands were retained, but the U.S. government declared other lands "surplus" to Indian needs and sold them privately, much reducing reservation holdings.

Collier was outraged at the Americanization programs imposed by the federal Office of Indian Affairs because they suppressed key elements in Indian culture, many of which had deep religious roots. The BIA was supported by numerous Protestant organizations, such as the YWCA Indian Department, as well as the Indian Rights Association. Descended from the pioneers who had suffered from Indian raids, they denounced the dances as immoral and pagan. He formed the American Indian Defense Association in 1923 to fight back through legal aid and to lobby for Indian rights. He failed to secure positive legislation to guarantee Indian religious freedom, but his efforts did force the Bureau to curb its program of cultural assimilation and to end its religious persecutions.

Collier believed that the general allotments of Indian reservation land was a complete failure that led to the increasing loss of Native American land. He emerged as a federal Indian policy reformer in 1922, and strongly criticized the BIA policies and implementation of the Dawes Act. Prior to Collier, criticism of the BIA had been directed at corrupt and incompetent officials rather than the policies. For the next decade, Collier fought against legislation and policies that he thought were detrimental to the well-being of Native Americans and was associated with the American Indian Defense Association, serving as executive secretary until 1933.

His work led Congress to commission a study in 1926–1927 of the overall condition of Native Americans in the United States. The results were called the Meriam Report. Published in 1928 as The Problem of Indian Administration, the Meriam Report revealed the failures of federal Indian policies and how they had contributed to severe problems with Native American education, health, and poverty. Collier's efforts, including the publication of the report, raised the visibility of Native American issues within the federal government. The Great Depression brought a harsher economic environment for most Native Americans. The administration of President Herbert Hoover reorganized the BIA and provided it with major funding increases.

In 1932 a Department of the Interior press release described Collier as a "fanatical Indian enthusiast with good intentions, but so charged with personal bias and the desire to get a victim every so often, that he does much more harm than good ... his statements cannot be depended upon to be either fair, factual or complete." Thus, Collier was criticized from both sides in the challenge he faced to reconcile the two Progressive ideals of "social justice and managerial efficiency".

== Commissioner of Indian Affairs (1933–1945) ==
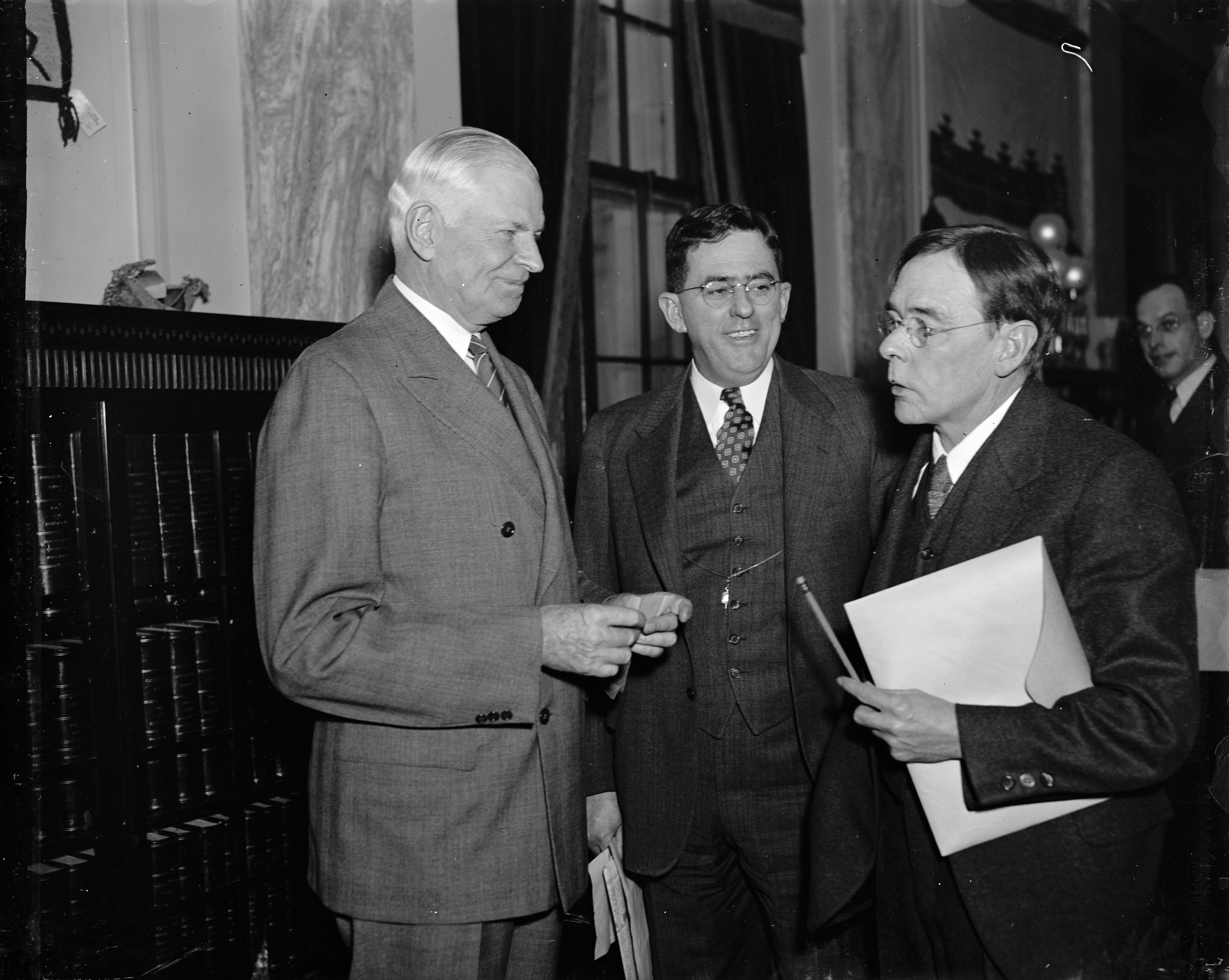
Left to right: Senator Elmer Thomas; Claude M. Hirst, Director of the Office of Indian affairs in Alaska; and John Collier, U.S. Commissioner of Indian Affairs

President Franklin D. Roosevelt took the advice of his new Interior Secretary Harold L. Ickes to appoint Collier as Commissioner of Indian Affairs in 1933. Ickes and Collier had previously been quite hostile to each other, but now came to terms and Ickes supported Collier's policies. Collier ran the agency until 1945.

Collier also set up the Indian Division of the Civilian Conservation Corps (CCC). The CCC provided jobs to Native American men of all ages in soil erosion control, reforestation, range development, and other public works projects, and built infrastructure such as roads and schools on reservations.

Education was a high priority for Collier, who focused on ending boarding schools and transitioning to community day schools and public schools. He wanted BIA schools to stress the importance of preserving Indian culture. He emphasized the need to develop vocational training that would lead to good jobs.

Collier thought he could not only preserve Indian culture but hold it up as a model for the larger society. Historian T. H. Watkins observed that this was "rather a lot to ask of a people struggling merely to live on the fringe of civilization that had overwhelmed them; it was even more to ask acceptance of such notions from a Congress that had demonstrated little faith in the belief that white civilization had anything much to learn from the Indians."

Collier introduced what became known as the Indian New Deal with Congress's passage of the Indian Reorganization Act of 1934. It was one of the most influential and lasting pieces of legislation relating to federal Indian policy. Also known as the Wheeler–Howard Act, this legislation reversed fifty years of assimilation policies by emphasizing Indian self-determination and a return of communal Indian land, which was in direct contrast with the objectives of the Indian General Allotment Act of 1887.

Collier was also responsible for getting the Johnson–O'Malley Act passed in 1934, which allowed the Secretary of the Interior to sign contracts with state governments to subsidize public schooling, medical care, and other services for Indians who did not live on reservations. The act was effective only in Minnesota.

Collier's decision to impose the Navajo Livestock Reduction program resulted in the Navajo losing half their livestock. The Indian Rights Association denounced Collier as a 'dictator' and accused him of a "near reign of terror" on the Navajo reservation. The American Indian Federation fought to remove Collier from office from 1934 to 1940.

In a 1938 speech to the Black Hills Indian Treaty Council Seneca journalist Alice Lee Jemison said: "The Wheeler-Howard Act provides only one form of government for the Indian and that is communal or cooperative form of living. John Collier said he was going to give the Indian self-government. If he was going to give us self-government he would let us set up a form of government we wanted to live under. He would give us the right to continue to live under our old tribal customs if we wanted to." According to historian Brian Dippie, "[Collier] became an object of 'burning hatred' among the very people whose problems so preoccupied him."

World War II speeded up the integration of Indians into the military and the urban labor force. The War Department in 1940 rejected Collier's suggestion for segregated all-Indian units. Indians were drafted into regular units, where they were treated on an equal basis with whites. In 1943, Collier married anthropologist Laura Maud Thompson, who was working as the Coordinator of the Indian Education, Personality and Administration Project.

== War Relocation Centers ==
Serving as Commissioner of Indian Affairs, Collier had experience in overseeing a minority population segregated by the federal government. Using this experience, he petitioned the Roosevelt administration to establish the Poston War Relocation Center on the Colorado River Reservation and Gila River War Relocation Center on the Gila River Reservation, where Japanese Americans were incarcerated during WWII.

He saw this as an opportunity to extend his sociological research of the Native American population onto another minority group, justifying that he could help maintain the social structures present within the Japanese American community. His oversight of the Poston camp was carried out alongside the War Relocation Authority under director Milton S. Eisenhower, although he enjoyed seemingly unimpeded jurisdiction for much of the incarceration period. At Gila River, however, the War Department denied him jurisdiction. They did this citing that the camp would be built at the department's expense, not the BIA's, even in the face of his repeated petitioning for administration rights.

Envisioning Poston as a place where the internees could "utterly give themselves to the community", Collier wanted to demonstrate the efficiency and the grandeur of cooperative living to the American public. He did this by facilitating communities that modeled alternative forms of social organization with the intention of offering a substantive critique of American society, with which he had grown disillusioned.

A second intention of his work was to provide the U.S. government with information about people of Japanese descent that could be implemented in their assumed occupation of East Asian "dependencies it might control at the end of the war."

An additional justification that he used contended that with his leadership, the Poston camp could help protect the Japanese-American community. Harking back to his broader position as the director of the BIA, Collier wanted to uphold Japanese culture as well as "[protect] them from civilian racism, and prepare [them] to reintegrate into U.S. society after the war."

Collier's independence was short lived, however, as Eisenhower, who had tolerated Collier's practices at the Poston camp, announced his departure from the WRA in June 1942. Seeing this as an opportunity to expand his influence over incarceration, Collier began a campaign to take over the vacant position, citing his prior experience with Native Americans and his oversight of Poston as qualifying factors. Ultimately, he was unsuccessful in this endeavor, losing out to the candidate Eisenhower had recommended.

As time went on, Collier began to notice a divide growing between his ideological vision for camp life at Poston and that of the new WRA director, Dillon S. Myer. Collier had attempted to foster traditional culture and community within the camps. This was in direct contrast with Myers's goal of promoting assimilation and individualism. Additionally, Myer had emphasized the possibility of Japanese-Americans' permanent dependence on government aid, influencing his thoughts on resettlement. Because of the ideological differences and pressure from Myers to implement a uniform policy at all relocation camps, Collier relinquished control over Poston to the WRA in 1943, effectively ending his involvement with Japanese-American incarceration.

== Post-government career ==
Collier remained active as the director of the National Indian Institute and as a sociology professor at the College of the City of New York. He wrote several books, including a memoir published in 1963. After his retirement Collier lived in Taos, New Mexico, with his second wife Grace, until his death in 1968 at age 84.

== Legacy ==
Having described the American society as "physically, religiously, socially, and aesthetically shattered, dismembered, directionless", Collier was later criticized for his romantic views about the moral superiority of traditional society as opposed to modernity. Philp says that after his experience at the Taos Pueblo, Collier "made a lifelong commitment to preserve tribal community life because it offered a cultural alternative to modernity . . . . His romantic stereotyping of Indians often did not fit the reality of contemporary tribal life."

The Indian New Deal, Collier's chief realization, was landmark legislation authorizing tribal self-rule under federal supervision, putting an end to land allotment and generally promoting measures to enhance tribes and encouraging education. Collier was highly regarded by most Indian tribes, although he was vilified by others. He antagonized the Navajo people, and some Iroquois, including the Seneca people. For the Oklahoma Indian population, largely exempted from the Indian New Deal, the influence of Collier's efforts was felt in their process of acquiring autonomy in the last decades of the 20th century.

Although it remained relatively obscure, his administration of a Japanese-American incarceration center is representative of Collier's affinity for marginalized populations. That is not to say that he was an inherent good for those incarcerated at Poston, nor Native Americans, but that he exhibited a level of attention to ostracized populations which was not all that common in American society up to that point. It is also important to recognize that the verdict amongst historians pertaining to Collier and Japanese-Americans is undecided and requires further academic scholarship.

Anthropologists criticized Collier for not recognizing the diversity of Native American lifestyles. Hauptman argues that his emphasis on Northern Pueblo arts and crafts and the uniformity of his approach to all tribes are partly explained by his belief that his tenure as Commissioner would be short, meaning that packaging large, lengthy legislative reforms seemed politically necessary.

Historians have mixed reactions to Collier's achievements. Many praise his energy and his initiative. Kenneth R. Philp, although favorable on some points, concludes that the Indian New Deal was unable to stimulate economic progress nor did it provide a usable structure for Indian politics. Philp argues these failures gave momentum to the return to the previous policy of termination that took place after Collier resigned in 1945. In surveying the scholarly literature, Schwartz concludes that there is:

A near consensus among historians of the Indian New Deal that Collier temporarily rescued Indian communities from federal abuses and helped Indian people survive the Depression but also damaged Indian communities by imposing his own social and political ideas on them.

Some of Collier's interests lived on in his sons (by his first wife Lucy): Charles (1909–1975) got engaged in the preservation of Los Luceros in Rio Arriba County, New Mexico, Donald became a prominent anthropologist, and John Jr. (1913–1992), a documentary photographer, significantly contributed to such fields as applied and visual anthropology.

Collier's efforts to lift the U.S. government's repressive tactics towards Native Americans represented a "seismic shift" in policy and paved the way, years later, for recognition of "the religious freedom rights of the Native Americans" as reflected in the American Indian Religious Freedom Act of 1978.

== Writings ==
- "The Board of Censorship," The Moving Picture World, vol. 4, no. 10 (March 6, 1909), pp. 265–266.
- "The Indian in a wartime nation". The Annals of the American Academy of Political and Social Science (1942): 29–35. JSTOR 1023781.
- "United States Indian Administration as a laboratory of ethnic relations". Social Research (1945): 265–303. JSTOR 40982119.
- The Indians of the Americas (New York: W. W. Norton, 1947) OCLC 875609410
- On the Gleaming Way: Navajos, Eastern Pueblos, Zunis, Hopis, Apaches, and Their Land; and Their Meanings to the World (Sage Books, 1949)
- From Every Zenith: a memoir; and some essays on life and thought (Sage Books, 1963)

== Archive ==
The Beinecke Rare Book & Manuscript Library at Yale University holds the John Collier papers (1922-1968), containing correspondence, personal and professional papers, and writings. The materials are open for research.

== Sources ==
- Blackman, Jon S. (2013). Oklahoma's Indian New Deal. University of Oklahoma Press. ISBN 978-0-8061-8922-2.
- Hauptman, Laurence (1979). "Alice Jemison ... Seneca Political Activist". The Indian Historian (Wassaja). 12 (July): 15–22, 60–62.
- Hauptman, Laurence (1988) [1981]. The Iroquois and the New Deal. Syracuse University Press. ISBN 0815624395.
- Iverson, Peter (2002). Diné: A History of the Navajos. University of New Mexico Press. pp. 137 ff. ISBN 9780826327161.
- Kelly, L. C. (1983) The Assault on Assimilation: John Collier and the Origins of Indian Policy Reform (University of New Mexico Press).
- Kelly, Lawrence C. (1975) "The Indian Reorganization Act: The Dream and the Reality," Pacific Historical Review (1975) 44#3 pp. 291–312 in JSTOR
- Laukaitis, John J. (2007). "Indians at Work and John Collier's Campaign for Progressive Education Reform," American Educational History Journal 33, no. 1 (Spring): 97–105.
- Parman, Donald L. (1994). Indians and the American West in the Twentieth Century. Indiana University Press.
- Philp, Kenneth R. "Collier, John"; American National Biography Online Feb. 2000
- Philp, K. R. (1977). John Collier's crusade for Indian reform, 1920–1954. Tucson: University of Arizona Press.
- Prucha, Francis Paul. (1986). The Great Father. ISBN 978-0-8032-8712-9 University of Nebraska Press.
- Rusco, E. R. (1991)."John Collier, Architect of Sovereignty or Assimilation?" American Indian Quarterly, 15(1):49–55.
- Schwartz, E. A. (1994). "Red Atlantis Revisited: Community and Culture in the Writings of John Collier." American Indian Quarterly. 18#4 pp: 507–531. in JSTOR
- Treglia, Gabriella. "Cultural Pluralism or Cultural Imposition? Examining the Bureau of Indian Affairs' Education Reforms during the Indian New Deal (1933–1945)." Journal of the Southwest 61.4 (2019): 821-862. summary
- Wallis, Michael & Parsons, Jack (2001). Heaven's Window: A Journey Through Northern New Mexico. Graphic Arts Center Publishing Co. pp. 73 ff. ISBN 9781558685475.
- Encyclopedia of World Biography
