= Sam Ahkeah =

Navajo Nation chairman (1896–1967)

Sam Ahkeah (March 8, 1896 – December 5, 1967) was a former Navajo Nation Chairman. He was elected as the 7th chairman of the Navajo Nation Tribal Council. He served in office from 1946 through 1954 and was elected to serve for two terms. Ahkeah served as an overseer for the Mesa Verde National Park. During his time in office, Chairman Ahkeah met with the United States Congress to discuss the Colorado River Storage Project. Ahkeah advocated for the Colorado River Storage Project because it would benefit the Navajo Nation.

== Early life ==
Sam Ahkeah was born March 8, 1896, to his parents Atcitty Biyeh and Asdza Bi-ee Llizhinii. He was born in Rock Point, Arizona, on the Navajo reservation and he is from the Bitter Water Clan (Todích'íí'nii). At the age of 8, Ahkeah left Rock Point to attend school in Fort Lewis, Colorado.

While attending school Ahkeah was diagnosed with tuberculosis, but recovered shortly after.

== Career ==
In August 1935, Ahkeah was employed as a manager for the Mesa Verde National Park where he had been recorded sharing the origin of "The Mud Story". Before becoming tribal chairman he was the vice president to Chairman Chee Dodge from (1942-1946). Chee Dodge was to be elected vice president for chairman Ahkeah's term, but had died before assuming office. Zealy Tso was elected to serve as the vice president for Ahkeah's term after Dodge's death. Ahkeah served as the Navajo Nation chairman for two terms from 1946 until 1954.

In 1947, Chairman Ahkeah hired attorney Norman Littell to represent the Navajo Nation. The Idea to hire Littell started when United States Congress decided to create the U.S. Indian Claims Commission.

During Ahkeah's term, he heavily advocated for a schools to be established on the Navajo Reservation so the children would be able to attend school.In May 1952, he submitted testimony to the Interior Department Senate Appropriations Committee (Bureau of Indian Affairs) requesting that the education rehabilitation funds, cut by the house to $2 million, be restored to the original budget of $20 million. On March 10, 1954, Ahkeah addressed the Rotary Club of Albuquerque advocating for a better education system for Navajo children so that they could be given the same opportunities as non-native children.

Ahkeah met with Congress to discuss water rights on the Navajo reservation in 1954. He advocated for the Colorado River Storage Project to be passed into law because it would benefit the Navajo Nation tribe, which resides near the Colorado River. Ahkeah argued that the Colorado River Storage Project would allow Navajo people to become independent by expanding employment on the reservation, by building schools, and by helping Navajo become taxpayers. He had also stated during his meeting with Congress that the Colorado River Storage Project would restore farming land that was once demolished by Kit Carson during the Navajo Long Walk in 1863. During his term, Ahkeah's goal was to improve the living conditions for the people of his tribe. He advocated for water rights, better education for indigenous students, and also equal opportunity for the Navajo people.

In 1954, Laura Gilpin an American photographer who was known for photographing the Southwest Tribes met with chairman Ahkeah. She met with him to capture photographs for the Navajos to aid against the U.S. Indian Claims Commission.

While also in office Ahkeah advocated for "Naat’áanii Day" which would be a paid holiday for the Navajo people that would honor past Navajo Leaders. This holiday would not come to pass until April 13, 2016, but Ahkeah was recognized for his involvement.

Ahkeah's term as chairman ended in 1954 and he tried to gain re-election, but Paul Jones won the election.

== Personal life ==
Ahkeah married Frances Descheene Ahkeah and together they shared 10 children. Their children are named Margaret Ahkeah, Lucy Ahkeah, Nora Ahkeah, Fannie Ahkeah, Elenor Ahkeah, Curtis Ahkeah, Robert Ahkeah, Bryson Ahkeah, and Rodger W. Ahkeah Sr. Ahkeah's daughter Elenor was heavily involved with the Navajo community, devoting her time to educating the youth. Elenor Ahkeah married Herbert T. Clah, whose father was also a Navajo Nation chairman.

Ahkeah later married Doris Begay. Their daughter Edith Ahkeah (d. 2023) served the Navajo community through the Indian Health Service, working for over three decades as a nurse, case manager, and hospital supervisor at Northern Navajo Medical Center in Shiprock, New Mexico.

On December 5, 1967, at the age of 71, Ahkeah died after being ill for many months prior. Ahkeah had been admitted to Shiprock Indian Health Services the week before and where he had stayed until his death.
