= John Collier Jr. =

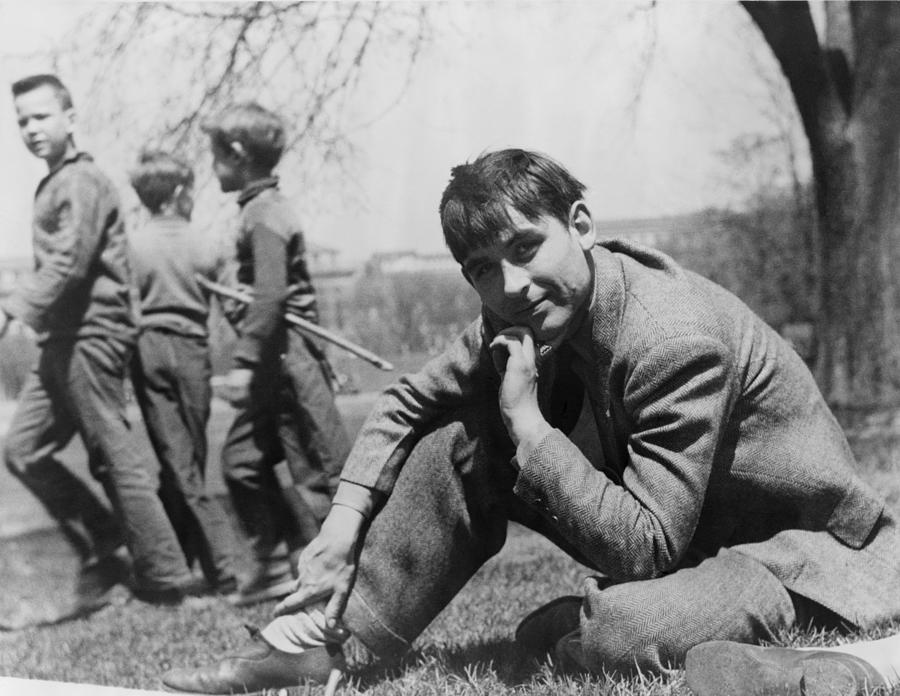
- Born: May 22, 1913; Sparkill, New York
- Died: February 25, 1992 (aged 78); San José, Costa Rica
- Scientific career
- Fields: Photography, Visual anthropology
- Workplaces: Standard Oil Company; Cornell University; San Francisco State University

Notes
- Collier's photographs are archived at the Maxwell Museum of Anthropology.

John Collier Jr. (May 22, 1913 – February 25, 1992) was an American anthropologist and an early leader in the fields of visual anthropology and applied anthropology. His emphasis on analyzing and using still photographs in ethnography led to significant contributions in other subfields of anthropology, especially the applied anthropology of education. His book, Visual Anthropology: Photography as a Research Method (1967), is one of the field's earliest textbooks. His photographs are archived at the Maxwell Museum of Anthropology at the University of New Mexico in Albuquerque.

== Early life and family ==
John Collier Jr., born May 22, 1913, in Sparkill, New York, was the son of Lucy Wood Collier and sociologist John Collier. His father headed the Bureau of Indian Affairs during the New Deal. John Jr. grew up largely in Taos, New Mexico, and in the San Francisco Bay Area, California. While living in Mill Valley, California, he suffered injuries in a car accident at age 8 that resulted in major brain injuries, associated learning disabilities, and hearing loss that prevented him from successfully completing school beyond a third-grade level, although he attended school sporadically into his teens. When it became evident that he could not perform in school, his family permitted him to spend considerable time living with family friends in the Taos Indian Pueblo. During his time in California, he came under the influence of Leighton Robinson, a retired English master in sail, who provided him with seamanship training.

He was also informally apprenticed to the Western painter, Maynard Dixon, who was then married to the photographer Dorothea Lange. He spent considerable time in the Dixon/Lange household in San Francisco during his early and mid teens and trained in a wide range of painting techniques and skills. When in Taos, he also received informal training from the artist Nicolai Fechin. This training largely ended in 1930 when he signed on as a seaman in the four-masted bark Abraham Rydberg for a voyage from San Francisco around Cape Horn to Dublin, Ireland, an experience arranged by Robinson. On his return, he continued to divide his time between Taos and the Bay Area, and in 1934 he established a home in Talpa, New Mexico, which would remain an anchor place throughout his life.

In 1943, he married Mary Elizabeth Trumbull, who became a long-term partner in his photographic and anthropological work. Their son Malcolm Collier also became an anthropologist who eventually collaborated with his father on a new edition of Visual Anthropology (1986). He had three other sons.

== Career and professional development ==
In the early 1930s, he served as an informal guide to photographer Paul Strand while Strand was in the Taos region, and he continued to pursue a career in painting and writing through the mid-1930s. Only after a brief, unproductive enrollment at the California School of Fine Arts (now the San Francisco Art Institute), where he took more painting classes, did he turn to photography. He was largely self-trained, except for some instruction in studio techniques from Sara Higgins Mack. In 1939, after working for a period in San Francisco, he opened a photographic studio in Taos, using what had been Paul Strand's darkroom and studio.

The studio was not financially successful, but his photographic skill increased significantly, and in 1940 he returned to San Francisco, where he worked both independently and for several commercial photographic studios. In 1941, probably through the influence of Dorothea Lange, some of his work from New Mexico came to the attention of Roy Emerson Stryker, who hired him to work for the Farm Security Administration (FSA) as a photographer. Collier's 1941 employment by the FSA under Stryker established his career in photography, and he continued with the photographic unit when it was transferred to the Office of War Information (OWI). Between 1941 and 1946, Collier Jr. produced a series of photographic works of impressive narrative quality, depicting life in New England, in particular the lives of Portuguese immigrants living in the Massachusetts. The aesthetic and scientific value of this series of photographs from his fieldwork is later recognized as an early academic work on Visual Anthropology, following Margaret Mead’s and Gregory Bateson’s pioneering accomplishments.

In mid 1943, he left the OWI and served in the Merchant Marine until late 1944, when Stryker hired him to work as a photographer for the Standard Oil Company in the Canadian Arctic and later in Latin America. While in Latin America in 1946, he took leave from Stryker's employment to collaborate with his wife, Mary E. T. Collier, and with the Ecuadorian anthropologist Anibal Buitron on an ethnographic study of Otavalo, Ecuador.

After leaving Standard Oil at the end of 1946, Collier worked as a freelance photographer in New Mexico and New York. In 1950, he was hired by Alexander H. Leighton of Cornell University as part of a multidisciplinary team investigating community mental health in the Maritimes of Canada. Leighton challenged Collier to formalize methodologies for using photography in social science research. Collier's efforts in this arena were in fact a collaborative production with Mary E. T. Collier, without whose translation of Collier's insights and discoveries into standard academic language would have been impossible. The work with Leighton laid the intellectual foundation for the later development of the methodologies for visual anthropology.

Collier later worked for Cornell in the Southwest and independently recorded the Cornell Vicos project in Peru during 1954 and 1955. He then freelanced out of New Mexico before moving to California in 1959, where he began a long career as a teacher at San Francisco State University and the San Francisco Art Institute.

Collier's work in visual anthropology was influenced by Roy Stryker and Alexander H. Leighton. George Spindler, the founder of educational anthropology, chose Collier's book Visual Anthropology (discussed below) for early inclusion in his series of basic anthropology books. Collier spent much of his professional life giving workshops on the use of photography in visual anthropology, in speeches and professional presentations, and in more traditional forms of anthropological writing. Although widely recognized as a fine photographer, his major accomplishment was developing and documenting methodologies for visual anthropology.

== Major projects, contributions to visual and applied anthropology ==
Starting with the work for Leighton in the Maritimes of Canada, Collier worked on a series of important projects. One example was an intensive documentation of the rural landscape, work, and people of Digby County in Nova Scotia in support of one of Leighton's studies funded by the Rockefeller Foundation. One of his more important efforts, still largely unpublished, was documentation of the still controversial "Cornell/Vicos Project." Directed by Alan Homberg of Cornell and Mario Vasquez of the Universidad de San Marcos, this project aimed to prepare the Indian community of Hacienda Vicos in the central highlands of Peru to survive successfully as a free and independent community. Collier carried out a complete visual ethnography of the community while also recording the operation of the applied project, making use of the full range of visual research methods he and Mary Collier had been developing since their first ethnographic effort with Anibal Buiton in 1946. These methods were further refined in the years following and finally published in 1967 as Visual Anthropology: Photography as a Research Method. Generally recognized as the first published use of the term 'visual anthropology', this book and its second edition (co-authored with Malcolm Collier) have remained important references in the field. In the introduction to the later edition, Edward T. Hall writes that the two Colliers (John Jr. and Malcolm) almost single-handedly established visual anthropology as an observational science in its own right.

Collier's own non-traditional education led him to an analysis and criticism of schooling in the United States, especially regarding the education of disabled children, Native American children, and others outside the mainstream. Recognition of his insights in this arena led to his joint appointment as a professor of both anthropology and education at San Francisco State College (now San Francisco State University). In 1969, he turned to motion picture film to explore cultural conflicts in schools for Native students in Alaska as part of a major national study of American Indian Education. In this and later film-based research carried out in Arizona and California, he articulated fresh perspectives toward these groups which emphasized the positive importance of cultural diversity and approaches to schooling that would build on children's own cultural origins and energy.

In visual anthropology and visual sociology, Collier is recognized as a major methodological pioneer, particularly for developing "photo-elicitation" techniques in which photographs are used systematically in interviews to elicit information and insight. In the revised version (1986) of Visual Anthropology he argues that many, including other cultural anthropologists, have been "blind" to what can be "seen" within the nonverbal sensibility. His chief contribution to anthropology is the view that seeing and representing the visual is as important as speaking or writing words. He challenged modern anthropological viewpoints that regard theory or conceptualization as the endpoint of ethnography or anthropological analysis. Instead, he believed that the very energy of a culture could be seen. Some have theorized that, because of his deafness, he developed his visual skills to a very high degree, as reflected in his photography and his writings. He was also unafraid to use anthropology to make recommendations, especially when study participants asked him to. His work has been referenced and his methods used, not only in visual anthropology and sociology but also in psychiatric and educational anthropology.

== Death ==
Collier died on February 25, 1992, aged 78, while on vacation in San José, Costa Rica, of internal bleeding following surgery. At the time of his death, he had homes in Muir Beach, California, and Talpa, New Mexico.
