= St. Michael's Mission (Window Rock, Arizona) =

- U.S. National Register of Historic Places
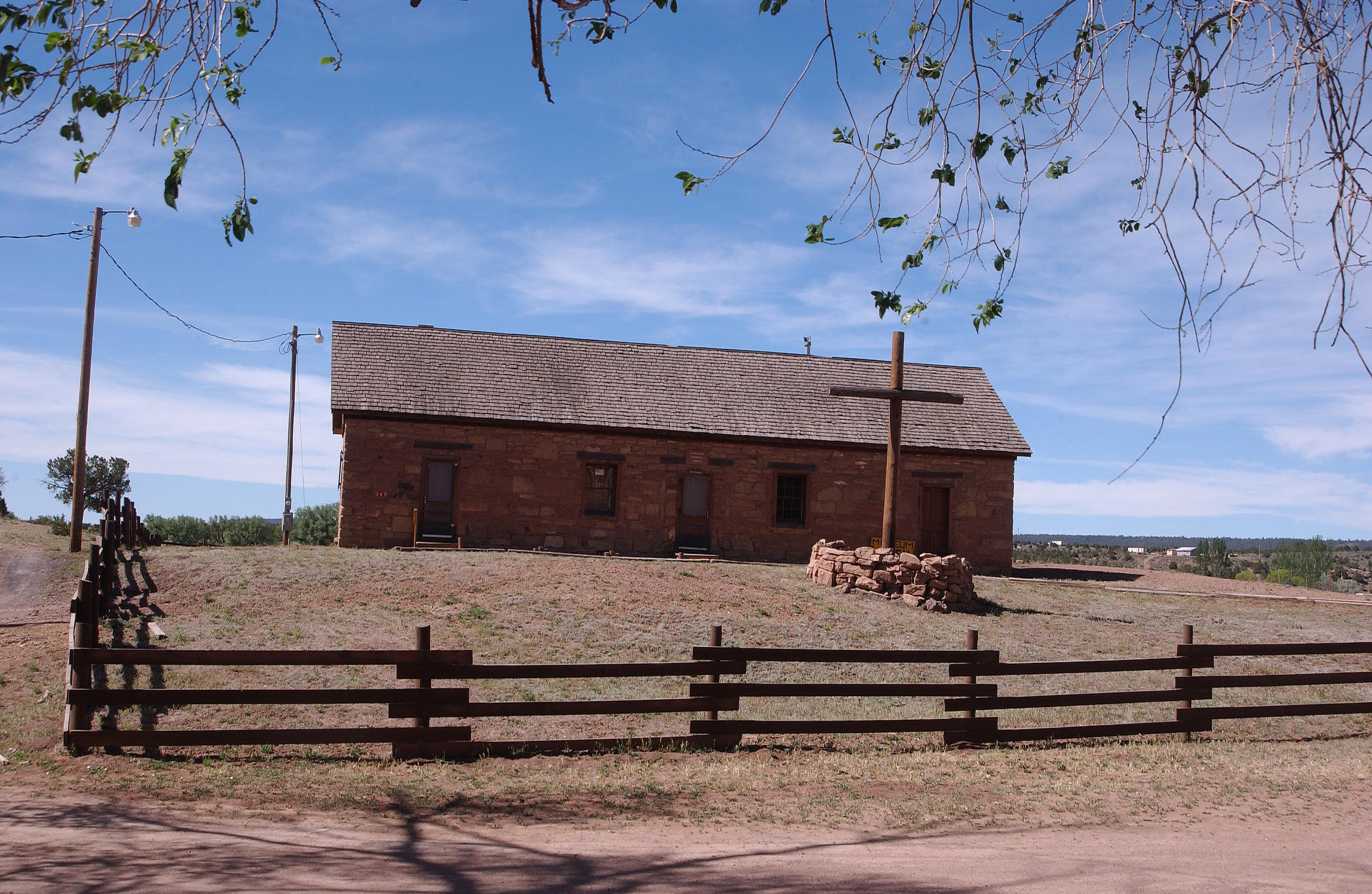
- St. Michael's Mission

- Location within Arizona Location within the United States
- Location: Window Rock, Arizona
- Coordinates: 35°38′44″N 109°05′53″W
- Area: 640 acres (260 ha)
- NRHP reference No.: 75000335
- Added to NRHP: May 29, 1975

St. Michael's Mission, the first permanent Catholic mission to the Navajo, was established in 1898. A school was opened in 1902.

== History ==
In 1895, a ranch known as "Cienega" was purchased by the Catholic Church from a local rancher by Katharine Drexel, at the prompting of Father Stephan of the Catholic Indian Bureau. It included a building which had been built by Billy Meadows as an intended trading post, but which had never been utilized as such. Three years later the building was remodeled in order to be used by Catholic missionaries as a mission. The land was located six miles outside of Fort Defiance, and about one mile outside the boundaries of the Navajo Reservation. There was initial difficulty in finding personnel willing to staff the mission, but Sister Katharine visited the Cincinnati province of Franciscans in 1897, and they agreed to provide the manpower. The mission became operational in 1898, the first permanent Catholic mission to the Navajo people. Part of the new mission contained a chapel, where the first Mass was said in October 1898. In the spring of 1899 a nearby log cabin was turned into a boarding school. A second school was opened in 1902, it originally had 56 students. Concurrently with the school, twelve sisters from the Sisters of the Blessed Sacrament arrived in late October 1902, housed in a separate building. The mission, led by Fathers Anselm Weber and Berard Haile published numerous papers on the Navajo language, including dictionaries and grammars. The site is owned by the Sisters of the Blessed Sacrament, and now consists of 640 acres (260 ha). In addition to the still active mission church, there is a museum on site, displaying Navajo artifacts, as well as items from the early Franciscan presence on the site. In 2023, the Franciscans announced that they would transfer the mission to the Roman Catholic Diocese of Gallup.

== Description ==
The mission is approximately 27 x 60 feet, with the length running east to west, and has a gabled shingle roof. There are three doors and three windows on the north side, while the south side there are no doors and four windows; both the east and west sides have a single window. The interior walls were plastered, and the original single room was split into six rooms. It contained four bedrooms, three of which you had to pass through to reach the chapel, which was the largest room, and situated on the west side of the building. In the chapel there were wooden stations of the cross, measuring four inches by two inches, as well as four plain wood kneelers. The chapel was heated by a small wood stove, and there was a small organ in the room next to the chapel, which provided music. There was another larger room on the east end which served as a combination kitchen-dining-living room, as well as a reception area.

== Legacy ==
Some of the books written by Weber and Haile include Vocabulary of the Navajo Language (1912); Manual of Navaho Grammar (1929); Learning Navajo, a four-volume work penned between 1942 and 1949; and A Stem Vocabulary of the Navaho Language (1951).

== See also ==
- National Register of Historic Places listings in Apache County, Arizona
