= Low Mountain, Arizona =

CDP in Navajo County, Arizona

- CDP
- Location within the state of Arizona Low Mountain (the United States)
- Coordinates: 35°56′53″N 110°05′53″W
- Country: United States
- State: Arizona
- County: Navajo

Area
  - Total: 36.90 sq mi (95.58 km^{2})
  - Land: 36.90 sq mi (95.56 km^{2})
  - Water: 0.0077 sq mi (0.02 km^{2})
- Elevation: 1,880 ft (570 m)

Population (2020)
  - Total: 631
  - Density: 17/sq mi (6.6/km^{2})
- Time zone: UTC-7 (MST)
- Area code: 928
- FIPS code: 04-42590
- GNIS feature ID: 2582817

Low Mountain is a census-designated place (CDP) in Navajo County, Arizona, United States. The population was 757 at the 2010 census.

== Geography ==
Low Mountain is located at 35°56′53″N 110°05′53″W (35.948089, −110.09813). According to the United States Geological Survey, the CDP has a total area of 36.91 square miles (95.6 km^{2}), consisting of 36.9 square miles (96 km^{2}) land and 0.01 square miles (0.026 km^{2}) water.

== Demographics ==
Historical population
Census	Pop.	Note	%±
2020	631		—
U.S. Decennial Census

As of the 2010 census, there were 757 people living in the CDP: 386 male and 371 female. 301 were 19 years old or younger, 180 were ages 20–34, 129 were between the ages of 35 and 49, 86 were between 50 and 64, and the remaining 61 were aged 65 and above. The median age was 24.0 years.

The racial makeup of the CDP was 99.1% American Indian, 0.1% White, and 0.8% two or more races. 0.7% of the population were Hispanic or Latino of any race.

There were 189 households in the CDP, 148 family households (78.3%) and 41 non-family households (21.7%), with an average household size of 4.01. Of the family households, 74 were married couples living together, while there were 25 single fathers and 49 single mothers; the non-family households included 34 adults living alone: 20 male and 14 female.

The CDP contained 260 housing units, of which 189 were occupied and 71 were vacant.
