= Berard Haile =

Missionary, anthropologist, and linguist (1874–1961)

Father Berard Haile O.F.M.
- Born: June 1, 1874; Canton, Ohio
- Died: September 30, 1961 (aged 87); Santa Fe, New Mexico
- Education: Catholic University of America, MA, 1929
- Occupation: missionary • linguist • anthropologist
- Years active: 1901–1954
- Religion: Roman Catholic
- Ordained: June 29, 1898

Father Berard Haile (1874–1961), O.F.M. (born Jacob Christopher Heile) was a Franciscan priest and one of the foremost authorities on Navajo anthropology. He entered the Franciscan Order in 1891 and was ordained a priest on June 29, 1898. He served at St. Michael's Mission, a Franciscan mission to the Navajo at St. Michaels, Arizona, and at other missions in the Southwest, from 1901 to 1954, where he developed an interest in Navajo language and culture. He helped devise a written alphabet of the Navajo language and published a four volume work on learning Navajo. In 1929 Haile attended the Catholic University of America and obtained a master's degree. He considered pursuing a doctorate degree in linguistics at the University of Vienna, but instead accepted the position of Research Associate in Anthropology at the University of Chicago. He made a field trip with Edward Sapir through Navajo land that was sponsored by the Laboratory of Anthropology at Santa Fe, New Mexico. Haile devised a new Navajo alphabet containing over sixty characters. His alphabet met with resistance from the Bureau of Indian Affairs, who preferred John Peabody Harrington's orthography. Haile's other major work dealt with the creation story of the Navajo, Diné Bahaneʼ.

Haile was awarded a Doctor of Letters degree from St. Bonaventure University in 1951, and a Doctor of Laws degree in 1952 from the University of New Mexico. In 1953 the Navajo Tribal Council passed a resolution which read in part: "Father Berard Haile has spent his life among the Navajo people learning to know and understand us and our religion, and has, more than any other living non-Indian, through close contact with Navajos and the medicine men of our tribe and by his indefatigable labor, reduced our language to written form and succeeded in preserving for future generations the knowledge of the Navajo history and religion."

== Bibliography ==
St. Michaels, Arizona Franciscans (1910). An Ethnologic Dictionary of the Navaho Language. St. Michaels, Arizona: Franciscan Fathers.

Haile, Berard (1938). Origin Legend of the Navaho Enemy Way. New Haven: Yale University Press.

Haile, Berard (1941). Learning Navaho, Vol. 1. St. Michaels, Arizona: St. Michaels Press.

Haile, Berard (1942). Learning Navaho, Vol. 2. St. Michaels, Arizona: St. Michaels Press.

Haile, Berard (1943). Origin Legend of the Navaho Flintway. Chicago: University of Chicago Press.

Haile, Berard (1946). The Navaho Fire Dance, or Corral Dance. St. Michaels, Arizona: St. Michaels Press.

Haile, Berard (1947). Learning Navaho, Vol. 3. St. Michaels, Arizona: St. Michaels Press.

Haile, Berard (1948). Learning Navaho, Vol. 4. St. Michaels, Arizona: St. Michaels Press.

Haile, Berard (1948). Prayer Stick Cutting in Five Night Navaho Ceremonial of the Male Branch of Shootingway. Chicago: University of Chicago Press.

Haile, Berard (1968). Property Concepts of the Navajo Indians. St. Michaels, Arizona: St. Michaels Press.
