= List of places in Arizona (N) =

This is a list of cities, towns, unincorporated communities, counties, and other places in the U.S. state of Arizona, which start with the letter N. This list is derived from the Geographic Names Information System, which has numerous errors, so it also includes many ghost towns and historical places that are not necessarily communities or actual populated places. This list also includes information on the number and names of counties in which the place lies, its lower and upper ZIP code bounds, if applicable, its U.S. Geological Survey (USGS) reference number(s) (called the GNIS), class as designated by the USGS, and incorporated community located in (if applicable).

== N ==
Name of place	Number of counties	Principal county	GNIS #(s)	Class	Located in	ZIP code	
Name of place	Number of counties	Principal county	GNIS #(s)	Class	Located in	Lower	Upper
Na Ah Tee	1	Navajo	24523	Populated Place			
Naco	1	Cochise	2408897	CDP		85620	
Nahata Dziil	1	Apache	2419027	Civil (Navajo Chapter)			
Narcho Santos	1	Pima	24525	Populated Place			
Navajo	1	Apache	8525	Populated Place		86509	
Navajo Indian Reservation	11 (Note: 7 counties in New Mexico, 3 counties in Arizona, and 1 county in Utah)	Apache	41148	Civil (Indian Reservation)		86515	
Navajo Mountain	3 (Note: Mainly in San Juan County, Utah, with portions in Coconino and Navajo Counties in Arizona)	Coconino	2419031	Civil (Navajo Chapter)			
Nawt Vaya	1	Pima	24530	Populated Place			
Nazlini	1	Apache	2408907	CDP		86540	
Nelson	1	Pima	2582830	CDP			
Nelson	2	Yavapai	8571	Populated Place		86434	
Newfield	1	Pima	24534	Populated Place			
New Kingman-Butler	1	Mohave	2408919	CDP			
New River	1	Maricopa	2408920	CDP		85027	
Nicksville	1	Cochise	32321	Populated Place		85615	
Noah	1	Yuma	24535	Populated Place			
Nogales	1	Santa Cruz	2411260	Civil (City)		85621	
Noipa Kam	1	Pima	32340	Populated Place			
Nolic	1	Pima	2582831	CDP		85634	
North Fork	1	Navajo	2582832	CDP			
North Komelik	2	Pinal	24290	Populated Place			
North Rim	1	Coconino	8757	Populated Place		86052	
Northwoods	1	Apache	39097	Populated Place			
Norton	1	Yuma		Populated Place			
Nutrioso	1	Apache	2582833	CDP		85932	
