= List of Navajo Nation Chapters =

Coordinates: 36°11′13″N 109°34′25″W

This is a list of Chapters of the Navajo Nation. The Navajo Nation is divided up geographically into Chapters which are similar in function to municipalities. Chapters are subdivisions of Agencies, which are similar in function to counties. Chapter officials operating out of a Chapter House register voters who may then vote to elect Delegates for the Navajo Nation Council or the President of the Navajo Nation.

The following table contains chapter names, chapter names in Navajo, a rough literal English translation, population, and land area estimates.

Navajo Nation Chapters
District	Chapter name	Chapter name (Navajo)	Chapter name (English literal translation)	Agency	Population (2010 Census)	Land area (acres)
1	Coppermine	Béésh Haagééd	"Digging out Metal"	Tuba City / Western	590	240,000
1	LeChee	Łichíiʼii	(name of extinct burgundy-colored medicinal plant)	Tuba City / Western	1,443	293,000
1	Tonalea	Tó Nehelį́į́h	"Water Collecting in a basin"	Tuba City / Western	2,595	153,000
1	Kaibeto	Kʼaiʼbiiʼtó	"Willows within the Water"	Tuba City / Western	1,963	234,795
2	Shonto	Shą́ą́ʼtóhí	"Water on the Sunny Side"	Tuba City / Western	2,124	425,000
2	Naatsis’áán (Navajo Mountain)	Naatsis’áán	"Earth Head"	Tuba City / Western	354	389,000
2	Ts’ah bii’ Kin (Inscription House)	Tsʼah Biiʼ Kin	"House in the field of Sagebrush"	Tuba City / Western	1,252	(Disputed with Lechee, Naatsis’áán)
3	Bodaway/Gap	Tsinaabąąs Habitiin	"Wagon Trail"	Tuba City / Western	1,704	590,000
3	Cameron	Naʼníʼá Hayázhí/Naʼníʼá Hasáanii	"Old Bridge"	Tuba City / Western	1,122	239,000
3	Tó Naneesdizí (Tuba City)	Tó Naneesdizí	"Tangled Water", "Scattered Water", "Braided Water"	Tuba City / Western	9,265	238,000
3	Coalmine Canyon	Łeejin Haagééd	"Digging out coal"	Tuba City / Western	691	402,357
4	Hard Rock	Tsé Dildǫ́ʼí		Chinle	1,161	78,100
4	Blue Gap/Tachee	Bis Dootłʼizh Ńdeeshgiizh/Táchii’	"Blue Clay Gap"/"Red Water"	Chinle	1,178	116,000
4	Forest Lake	Tsinyiʼ Beʼekʼid	"Pond between the trees"	Chinle	471	125,000
4	Black Mesa	Kitsʼiilí	"Shattered House"	Chinle	428	157,000
4	Pinon	Beʼekʼid Baa Ahoodzání	"Body of Water in a Sunken Area"	Chinle	2,751	107,250
4	Whippoorwill Springs	Hoshdódii Tó	"Whippoorwill Spring"	Chinle	1,489	32,605
5	Tolani Lake	Tó Nehelį́į́h	"Water Collecting in a Basin"	Tuba City / Western	647	157,000
5	Tsídii Tó (Bird Springs)	Tsídii Toʼí	"Bird Springs"	Tuba City / Western	532	194,587
5	Leupp	Tółchí’íkooh/Tsiizizii/Tooh		Tuba City / Western	951	303,746
7	Low Mountain	Jeeh Deezʼá/Tʼáá Sahdii Dah Azkání	"Piñon Gum Point"	Fort Defiance	757	41,382
7	Jeddito	Jádító	"Antelope Springs"	Fort Defiance	1,200	100,342
7	Teesto	Tʼiis Tó/Ha’naa N’deetiin/Naaʼnideetiin		Fort Defiance	930	98,145
7	Dilkon	Tó Áłch’į́į́dí	"Smooth Butte"	Fort Defiance	1,411	244,283
7	Indian Wells	Tó Hahadleeh	"Dripping Water"	Fort Defiance	1,287	227,500
7	White Cone	Beʼekʼid Baaʼoogeedí	"excavated for a pond"	Fort Defiance	1,284	20,000
8	Oljato	Ooljéé’ Tó	"To Moonwater"	Tuba City / Western	2,455	429,000
8	Dennehotso	Deinihootso	"Meadows Merging"	Tuba City / Western	746	292,000
8	Kayenta	Tó Dínéeshzheeʼ	"Fingers of Water"	Tuba City / Western	5,189	504,811
8	Chilchinbeto	Chiiłchin Bii’ Tó	"Sumac Spring"	Tuba City / Western	1,165	243,000
9	Teec Nos Pos	Tʼiis Názbąs	"Cottonwood Trees in a Circle"	Shiprock	1,301	233,000
9	Rock Point	Tsé Nitsaa Deezʼáhí	"Big Rock Point"	Shiprock	642	138,758
9	Red Mesa	Tsé Łichííʼ Dah Azkání	"Red Rock Mesa"	Shiprock	1,222	267,000
9	Mexican Water	Naakaii Tó		Shiprock	976	160,000
9	Tó Łikan (Sweetwater)	Tółikan	"Sweet Water"	Shiprock	1,535	152,000
10	Many Farms	Dáʼákʼeh Halání	"Many Fields"	Chinle	2,738	168,000
10	Rough Rock	Tséchʼízhí	"Rough Rock"	Chinle	947	53,000
10	Chinle	Ch’ínílį́	"It flows out horizontally"	Chinle	8,005	155,000
10	Tselani/Cottonwood	Tsé Łání	"Many Rocks"	Chinle	1,425	252,518
10	Nazlini	Názlíní	"bend in the river"	Chinle	489	217,000
11	Lukachukai	Lókʼaʼchʼégai/Lókʼaʼjígai	"White Reeds Extending Out"	Chinle	2,154	97,000
11	Round Rock	Tsé Nikání	"Round Rock"	Chinle	1,566	201,000
11	Tsaile/Wheatfields/Blackrock	Tsééhílį́/Tódzísʼá/Tsézhiní	"Flowing through rock"/"Wheatfields"/"Blackrock"	Chinle	2,250	162,000
12	Aneth	Tʼáá Bííchʼį́įdii	"Just like the Devil"	Shiprock	1,989	184,000
12	Beclabito	Bitłʼááh Bitoʼ	"Water Underneath"	Shiprock	749	87,000
12	Gadii'ahi/To'Koi (Cudeii)	Gad Ííʼáhí/Tókǫʼí	"Juniper Tree Sticking in the Ground"/"Fire Water"	Shiprock	550	44,000
12	Shiprock	Naatʼáanii Nééz/Tsé Bit’a’í	"Rock with Wings"	Shiprock	9,126	125,000
12	Hogback	Tsétaakʼáán	"Rock Uplift"	Shiprock	1,215	60,363
12	Red Valley	Tsé Łichíí’ Dah Azkání	"Red Rock Mesa"	Shiprock	1,417	221,000
12	Cove	Kʼaabizhiistłʼah	"Nestled in a cove"	Shiprock	430	44,000
12	Tsé Ałnáozt’i’í (Sanostee)	Tséʼałnáoztʼiʼí		Shiprock	1,795	314,000
12	Toadlena/Two Grey Hills	Tó Háálį́/Bis Dah Łitso	"Where the Water Flows Out"/"Two grey hills"	Shiprock	1,157	85,000
12	Newcomb	Bis Deezʼáhí/Tʼiis Ndeeshgiizh	"Cottonwoods Spreading out from the wash"	Shiprock	339	57,000
12	Sheep Springs	Tó Haltsooí	"Yellow Springs"	Shiprock	245	108,563
13	Upper Fruitland	Doo Alkʼahii	"Nonfattening"	Shiprock	2,751	83,400
13	T’iis Tsoh Sikaad (Burnham)	Tʼiistsoh Sikaad	"Big Tree Spreading Out"	Shiprock	280	185,807
13	Nenahnezad	Niinahnízaad	"a long incline"	Shiprock	688	17,000
13	San Juan	Tsétsį́į́ Nániitłʼiní	N/A	Shiprock	1,500 (est.)	shared with Nenahnezad
14	Naschitti	Nahashchʼidí	"Badger"	Fort Defiance	301	188,000
14	Tohatchi	Tó Haachʼiʼ	"One Who Digs for Water"	Fort Defiance	1,450	131,000
14	Coyote Canyon	Maʼii Tééh Yitłizhí	"Coyote fell in the watering hole"	Fort Defiance	1,451	125,996
14	Báhástł’ah (Twin Lakes)	Tsénáhádzoh/Bááhaztłʼah	"Canyon Cove"	Fort Defiance	2,212	69,000
14	Mexican Springs (Nakaibito)	Naakaii Bitoʼ		Fort Defiance	1,418	115,000
15	Becenti	Jádí Haditʼįįh/Tłʼóoʼditsin	"Antelope Lookout"/"Trees outside"	Crownpoint / Eastern	403	194,000
15	Crownpoint	Tʼiistsʼóóz Ńdeeshgizh	"Skinny Tree Canyon"	Crownpoint / Eastern	2,729	67,000
15	Nahodishgish (Note: Nahodishgish Chapter was originally known as "Dalton's Pass" but was reverted to its Navajo name.)	Náhodeeshgiizh	"The Gap"	Crownpoint / Eastern	408	64,000
15	Torreon/Star Lake	Yaʼniilzhiin/Naʼneelzhiin	"Dark-colored barrier"	Crownpoint / Eastern	1,612	119,000
15	Pueblo Pintado	Náhodeeshgiizh Chʼínílíní	"Flowing out from the Gap"	Crownpoint / Eastern	419	190,000
15	White Horse Lake	Tó Hweełhíní/Łį́į́łgaii Beʼekʼid		Crownpoint / Eastern	406	312,000
15	Lake Valley	Beʼekʼid Halgaii		Crownpoint / Eastern	306	84,000
15	White Rock	Tséłgaii	"White Rock"	Crownpoint / Eastern	76	110,000
15	Tsé Íí’áhí (Standing Rock)	Tsé Ííʼáhí	"Standing Rock"	Crownpoint / Eastern	641	74,104
15	Littlewater	Tó Áłtsʼíísí		Crownpoint / Eastern	427	64,962
15	Casamero Lake	Tsétaʼ Tóakʼoolí	"Water waves among the rock"	Crownpoint / Eastern	518	64,000
16	Thoreau	Dlǫ́ʼí Yázhí	"Little Prairie Dog"	Crownpoint / Eastern	1,433	31,000
16	Chichiltah	Chéchʼiltah/Chéchʼilłání	"Among the Oaks"	Crownpoint / Eastern	1,443	133,000
16	Baca/Prewitt	Kin Łigaaí	"White House"	Crownpoint / Eastern	789	127,000
16	Mariano Lake	Beʼekʼid Hóteelí		Crownpoint / Eastern	823	67,000
16	Smith Lake	Tsin Názbąs Siʼą́	"Round Tree"	Crownpoint / Eastern	951	38,000
16	Church Rock	Kinłitsosinil	"Group of Yellow Houses"	Crownpoint / Eastern	1,983	58,000
16	Bááh Háálį́ (Breadsprings)	Bááh Háálį́	"Bread Springs", "Bread Flowing Out"	Crownpoint / Eastern	908	49,273
16	Tsé Łichíí’ (Red Rock)	Tsé Łichííʼ	"Red Rock"	Crownpoint / Eastern	1,866	42,365
16	Rock Springs	Tséch’ízhí	"Rough Rock"	Crownpoint / Eastern	1,086	27,000
16	Manuelito	Kin Hózhóní	"Beautiful House"	Crownpoint / Eastern	264	57,000
16	Tsayatoh	Tséyaa Tó	"Water Under the Rock"	Crownpoint / Eastern	658	80,000
16	Pinedale	Tó Bééhwiisgání	"Hardened Mud around the Water"	Crownpoint / Eastern	1,109	41,000
16	Iyanbito	Ayání Bitoʼ	"Buffalo Springs"	Crownpoint / Eastern	890	29,000
17	Klagetoh	Łeeyiʼtó	"Water under the Ground"	Fort Defiance	909	152,000
17	Wide Ruins	Kinteel	"Wide House"	Fort Defiance	1,095	149,000
17	Kinlichee	Kin Dah Łichííʼ	"Red House"	Fort Defiance	1,610	234,342
17	Ganado	Lókʼaahnteel	"Wide Reeds"	Fort Defiance	1,210	91,535
17	Cornfields	Kʼiiłtsoiitah	"Rabbit brush"	Fort Defiance	911	44,000
17	Greasewood Springs	Díwózhii Biiʼ Tó	"Greasewood Springs"	Fort Defiance	1,320	314,006
17	Steamboat	Tóyééʼ/Hóyéé’		Fort Defiance	1,226	201,000
18	Crystal	Tó Niłtsʼílí	"Crystal-Clear Water"	Fort Defiance	311	91,000
18	Red Lake	Beʼekʼid Halchííʼ		Fort Defiance	2,028	44,000
18	Sawmill	Niʼiijííh Hasání		Fort Defiance	1,054	77,000
18	St. Michaels	Tsʼíhootso/Ch’íhootso	"Green Meadow"	Fort Defiance	5,643	76,000
18	Fort Defiance	Tséhootsooí		Fort Defiance	3,624	102,159
18	Houck	Maʼiitoʼí	"Coyote Spring"	Fort Defiance	1,024	94,080
18	Nahata Dziil (New Lands)	Nahatʼá Dziil	"Strength through Planning"	Fort Defiance	1,652	352,000
18	Oak Springs/Pine Springs	Teeł Chʼínítʼiʼ	"Cattails in a Row"	Fort Defiance	533	77,000
18	Tsé Si’ání (Lupton)	Tsé Siʼání	"Sitting Rock", "Unmoveable Rock"	Fort Defiance	902	80,139
19	Huerfano	Hanáádlį́	"Water Coming Up"	Crownpoint / Eastern	3,000	548,328
19	Naageezi	Naayízí	"Cucurbita"	Crownpoint / Eastern	286	223,000
19	Ojo Encino	Chéchʼiizh Biiʼ Tó/Tséchʼízhí Bitoʼ		Crownpoint / Eastern	688	79,000
19	Counselor	Bilagáana Nééz		Crownpoint / Eastern	870	71,000
21	Tohajiileeh/Canyoncito	Tó Hajiileehé	"Where they pull the water up and it keeps refilling itself"	Crownpoint / Eastern	1,591	76,000
22	Alamo	Tʼiistsoh/Tʼiistsoh Sikaad	"Big Cottonwood Tree"	Crownpoint / Eastern	2,006	65,000
23	Ramah	Tłʼohchiní	"Onions"	Crownpoint / Eastern	1,400 (2013 census)	168,000
