= Rainbow City =

Rainbow City can refer to:

- Rainbow City, Alabama
- Rainbow City, Arizona
- Rainbow City, Panama
- Rainbow City (TV series), shown on the BBC in 1967, it was the first British television series to star a black actor
- Rainbow City, an installation by FriendsWithYou, seen in Toronto, Miami, and New York City
