= Monument Valley (disambiguation) =

Monument Valley is a region of the Colorado Plateau.

Monument Valley may also refer to:

== Places ==
- Monument Valley Park, a historic park in Colorado Springs, Colorado

== Arts, entertainment, and media ==
- Monument Valley, a Buckethead album
- Monument Valley (video game), a 2014 puzzle game developed by Ustwo
  - Monument Valley 2, its 2017 sequel
  - Monument Valley 3, the 2024 sequel to Monument Valley 2

== Other uses ==
- Monument Valley High School (Arizona), in Kayenta, Arizona
- Monument Valley High School (Utah), in Oljato-Monument Valley, Utah
- Monument Valley Film Festival, a film festival held in Kayenta, Arizona

== See also ==
- Oljato-Monument Valley (disambiguation)
