= Oljato-Monument Valley =

Oljato-Monument Valley is a double community on the border of the U.S. states of Arizona and Utah. It includes the following census-designated places:

- Oljato-Monument Valley, Arizona
- Oljato-Monument Valley, Utah

== See also ==
- Monument Valley (disambiguation)
- Oljato (disambiguation)
