= Nelson, Arizona =

Nelson may refer to the following places in the U.S. state of Arizona:

- Nelson, Pima County, Arizona, an unincorporated community and census-designated place
- Nelson, Yavapai County, Arizona, an unincorporated community
