= Nikki Cooley =

Grand Canyon river rafting guide

- Citizenship: Navajo Nation and U.S.
- Education: B.A. and M.A. - Northern Arizona University
- Scientific career
- Workplaces: Institute for Tribal Environmental Professionals

Nikki Cooley is the co-manager for the Institute for Tribal Environmental Professional's Tribes' Climate Change Program and is the first Navajo person to gain a river rafting guide license for the Grand Canyon.

== Early life and education ==
Nikki Cooley grew up on the Navajo Nation reservation in Shonto, Arizona, a small community with just over 500 residents, about two hours away from Flagstaff. The home she lived in with her grandparents did not have electricity, and the nearest source of drinking water was 15 mi (24 km) away. This, as well as her time spent outside herding sheep, riding horses, and growing corn and squash on the reservation, sparked her love of the environment and value for natural resources . When she was in elementary school, she started writing letters to people in power, including senators and representatives.

As a child, Cooley was not initially expected to attend college. However, she enrolled at Northern Arizona University (NAU) as the first member of her immediate family to get higher education at a college or university. At NAU she received her bachelors and masters of Forestry, working extensively with tribes across the county, including the Cherokee Tribe of North Carolina, in order to learn about traditional indigenous knowledge. Cooley continued to University of Michigan for post-graduate studies in Fisheries and Wildlife though she is not currently pursuing a PhD.

== Career ==
Cooley works for the Institute for Tribal Environmental Professionals (ITEP), an organization that assists all federally-recognized tribes in sustainable resource management. She is a co-manager for ITEP's Tribes and Climate Change Program, which involves providing science, tools, assistance, and training for tribes across the country who are looking for support. This incorporates traditional indigenous knowledge and could be in the form of webinars, in-person training, or conferences, depending on the individual needs of the tribes. She also offers climate adaptation plan templates that make the process of adaptation planning more straightforward and manageable.

=== Public engagement ===
On top of her career as a co-manager for ITEPs Tribal Climate Change Program, Cooley also works as a river rafting guide in the Grand Canyon. She was the first Navajo woman to be certified as a river guide for the Grand Canyon. The Grand Canyon National park encompasses the original territory of 11 Native American tribes, and is of great importance for these communities. Yet, there was a lack of education and cultural interpretation of the rivers for visitors regarding both its history and current significance to the 11 tribes. She felt that these tribes deserved to have their stories shared, so she decided to address this issue. This led to Cooley starting a training program at Northern Arizona University in 2008 with the mission of incorporating more Native American individuals into the industry as river guides. At this point, the university had already been gifted a river permit by the president of Arizona Raft Adventures on the San Juan, and over fifty guides have been certified there since.

She was also an advocate for Save the Confluence, a Navajo organization whose goal was to protect the Grand Canyon from the Escalade. The Escalade was a gondola complex that would bring an influx of tourists to the confluence, an estimated 5,000-10,000 people a day, disrupting the serene area and causing environmental degradation. The confluence is an area that many Native Americans hold sacred and is central to many origin stories. Thanks to the work of Cooley and many others, the Escalade is no longer a threat to the Grand Canyon.
