= Alchesay High School =

School in Navajo County, Arizona

Location
- 200 Falcon Way; Whiteriver, Navajo County, Arizona; United States
- Coordinates: 33°49′53″N 109°58′23″W

Information
- Established: 1956 (70 years ago)
- School district: Whiteriver Unified School District
- CEEB code: 030538
- Principal: Leeann Lacapa
- Teaching staff: 33.00 (FTE)
- Enrollment: 806 (2023–2024)
- Student to teacher ratio: 24.42
- Colors: Corn gold and Columbia blue
- Mascot: Falcon
- Website: www.wusd.us/page/ahs.homepage

Alchesay High School is a public high school on the Fort Apache Indian Reservation in Whiteriver, Arizona, Navajo County. It was founded in 1956 and named after Chief Alchesay, who was a key person in the formation of the White Mountain Apache tribe. (More than half of the students at Alchesay are White Mountain Apache.) The first graduating class graduated in 1960.

It is not on its original campus site: the old "white house" school was abandoned for the old Northland Pioneer College building (now in renovations to be used as the elementary school). It moved to its current site in 1980 and expanded in 1999.

National Basketball Association hall of famer Kareem Abdul-Jabbar was an assistant basketball coach at the school in the late 1990s. He first visited the area doing research on the Buffalo Soldiers.

In 2008, the high school was set in two different campuses where the students could walk between each building due to water problems in the "old" high school. It only lasted for one academic school year. In 2010, they moved the high school completely to the old middle school building, which had been renovated.

== Awards ==
In 2002, 1000 students were awarded the Presidential Award for Academic Excellence. Eight years later in 2010 one student received the Gates Millennium Scholarship as well as four more recipients in 2011.
