= Whiteriver Unified School District =

School district in Arizona

Whiteriver Unified School District is a school district in Navajo County, Arizona, United States.

The district serves parts of Navajo County, including the communities of Cibecue, East Fork, and Whiteriver.

== Service area ==
Young Elementary School District included sections of the Fort Apache Indian Reservation. In 1984 the Young district contracted with Whiteriver USD to educate the Fort Apache students, numbering about 200, due to roads being inaccessible between Fort Apache and Young. As of 2020 these parts of the reservation are now directly in Whiteriver USD.

== Schools ==
High schools

- Alchesay High School and the Career and Technical Education Bldg.

Middle schools

- Canyon Day Junior High School
- Theodore Roosevelt School*

Elementary schools

- Cradleboard Elementary School is a kindergarten through Sixth Grade Elementary School located in the Cradleboard neighborhood of Whiteriver. Cradleboard is on the White Mountain Apache Reservation in the White Mountains of Arizona.
- Mary V. Riley Seven Mile Elementary School is the PreK-5 Elementary School. This school feeds in the southern areas of Whiteriver including Canyon Day, 7 Mile, East Fork, and Fort Apache.
- Whiteriver Elementary School is a kindergarten through Fifth grade.
