= Lake of the Woods, Arizona =

CDP in Navajo County, Arizona

- CDP
- Location within the state of Arizona Lake of the Woods (the United States)
- Coordinates: 34°09′22″N 109°59′59″W
- Country: United States
- State: Arizona
- County: Navajo

Area
  - Total: 4.14 sq mi (10.73 km^{2})
  - Land: 3.97 sq mi (10.27 km^{2})
  - Water: 0.18 sq mi (0.46 km^{2})
- Elevation: 6,785 ft (2,068 m)

Population (2020)
  - Total: 3,648
  - Density: 920/sq mi (355.2/km^{2})
- Time zone: UTC-7 (MST)
- Area code: 928
- FIPS code: 04-39790
- GNIS feature ID: 2582812

Lake of the Woods is a census-designated place (CDP) in Navajo County, Arizona, United States, adjacent to the town of Pinetop-Lakeside. The population was 4,094 at the 2010 census.

== Geography ==
The CDP has a total area of 4.14 square miles (10.7 km^{2}), consisting of 3.96 square miles (10.3 km^{2}) of land and 0.18 square miles (0.47 km^{2}) of water.

== Demographics ==
Historical population
Census	Pop.	Note	%±
2010	4,094		—
2020	3,648		−10.9%
U.S. Decennial Census

=== 2020 census ===
As of the 2020 census, Lake of the Woods had a population of 3,648. The median age was 49.1 years. 20.6% of residents were under the age of 18 and 25.7% of residents were 65 years of age or older. For every 100 females there were 99.7 males, and for every 100 females age 18 and over there were 98.0 males age 18 and over.

97.3% of residents lived in urban areas, while 2.7% lived in rural areas.

There were 1,542 households in Lake of the Woods, of which 24.4% had children under the age of 18 living in them. Of all households, 49.4% were married-couple households, 19.9% were households with a male householder and no spouse or partner present, and 23.7% were households with a female householder and no spouse or partner present. About 30.4% of all households were made up of individuals and 15.0% had someone living alone who was 65 years of age or older.

There were 2,832 housing units, of which 45.6% were vacant. The homeowner vacancy rate was 3.0% and the rental vacancy rate was 15.2%.

Racial composition as of the 2020 census
Race	Number	Percent
White	2,935	80.5%
Black or African American	16	0.4%
American Indian and Alaska Native	133	3.6%
Asian	33	0.9%
Native Hawaiian and Other Pacific Islander	1	0.0%
Some other race	213	5.8%
Two or more races	317	8.7%
Hispanic or Latino (of any race)	727	19.9%

=== 2010 census ===
As of the 2010 census, there were 4,094 people living in the CDP: 2,078 male and 2,016 female. 1,185 were 19 years old or younger, 610 were ages 20–34, 744 were between the ages of 35 and 49, 907 were between 50 and 64, and the remaining 648 were aged 65 and above. The median age was 41.4 years.

The racial makeup of the CDP was 86.1% White, 2.4% American Indian, 0.7% Asian, 0.6% Black or African American, 7.6% Other, and 2.5% two or more races. 19.6% of the population were Hispanic or Latino of any race.

There were 1,607 households in the CDP, 1,093 family households (68.0%) and 514 non-family households (32.0%), with an average household size of 2.54. Of the family households, 815 were married couples living together, while 91 were single fathers and 187 were single mothers; the non-family households included 418 adults living alone: 221 male and 197 female.

The CDP contained 2,859 housing units, of which 1,607 were occupied and 1,252 were vacant.
