= Holbrook Unified School District =

School district in Navajo County, Arizona

Address
- 1000 North 8th Avenue Holbrook, Arizona, 86025; United States

District information
- Type: Public
- Grades: PreK–12
- NCES District ID: 0403820

Students and staff
- Students: 1,819
- Teachers: 121.11
- Staff: 149.32
- Student–teacher ratio: 15.02

Other information
- Website: www.holbrook.k12.az.us

Holbrook Unified School District is a school district based in Holbrook, Arizona, United States. Currently it is one of the highest paying school districts in Navajo County.

Holbrook USD serves the majority of the city of Holbrook and several census-designated places in Navajo County, Arizona: Greasewood, Indian Wells, Sun Valley, Woodruff, and much of Dilkon and Whitecone.

== History ==
In 2013 the district leadership asked voters to approve an "override" of its budget. The measure succeeded, with 419 approving and 371 rejecting, a 53–47% basis.

== Schools ==
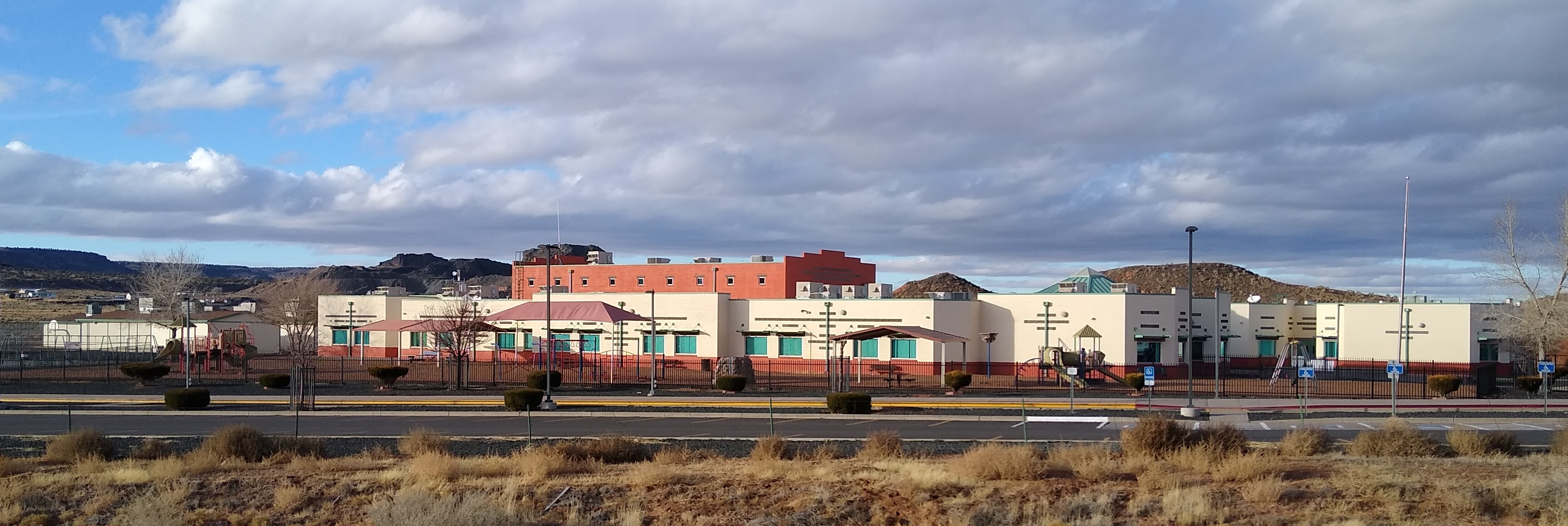
Indian Wells Elementary School

Secondary

- Holbrook High School (Holbrook) - The new George Gardner Performing Arts Center at Holbrook High School is completed.
- Holbrook Junior High School (Holbrook)

Primary

- Indian Wells Elementary School (K–6) (Unincorporated Navajo County (Indian Wells) - Indian Wells, which opened in 2002, was built to end long daily school bus trips to the city of Holbrook.
- Hulet Elementary School (3–5) (Holbrook)
- Park Elementary School (K–2) (Holbrook)
