= Cibecue, Arizona =

Fort Apache Indian Reservation community

- Census-designated place
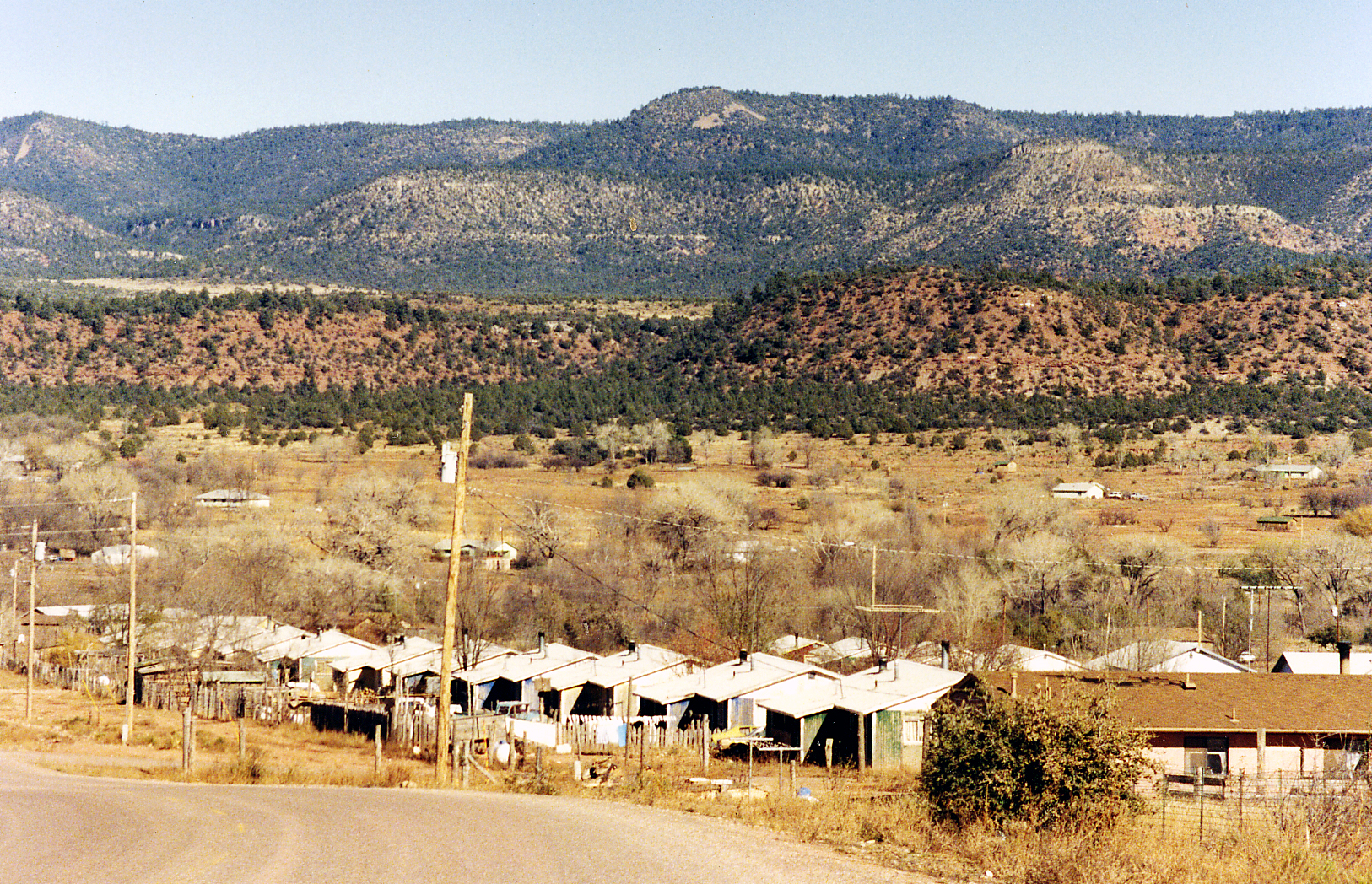
- View of Cibecue

- Location in the Fort Apache Indian Reservation, Navajo County, and the state of Arizona

- Location in Arizona Location in United States
- Coordinates: 34°01′52″N 110°29′48″W
- Country: United States
- State: Arizona
- County: Navajo

Area
  - Total: 5.97 sq mi (15.47 km^{2})
  - Land: 5.97 sq mi (15.46 km^{2})
  - Water: 0 sq mi (0.00 km^{2})
- Elevation: 4,964 ft (1,513 m)

Population (2020)
  - Total: 1,816
  - Density: 304.1/sq mi (117.43/km^{2})
- Time zone: UTC-7 (MST)
- ZIP code: 85911
- Area code: 928
- FIPS code: 04-13400
- GNIS feature ID: 2407619

Cibecue (Western Apache: Dishchiiʼ Bikoh "Horizontally Red Valley/Canyon") is a census-designated place (CDP) in Navajo County, Arizona, United States, on the Fort Apache Indian Reservation. The population was 1,816 in the 2020 United States Census.

The current council leaders are Travis Tessay Sr. and Tony Alsenay.

The Cibecue community has a high unemployment rate, which was exacerbated by the Rodeo–Chediski Fire, Arizona's second-largest wildfire in recorded history. Education is the sector that employs the most people in the community.

== Geography ==
According to the United States Census Bureau, the CDP has a total area of 6.0 square miles (16 km^{2}), all land.

=== Climate ===
Climate data for Cibecue, Arizona, 1914–2000
Month	Jan	Feb	Mar	Apr	May	Jun	Jul	Aug	Sep	Oct	Nov	Dec	Year
Mean daily maximum °F (°C)	52.3 (11.3)	56.5 (13.6)	61.8 (16.6)	70.1 (21.2)	78.8 (26.0)	88.5 (31.4)	91.3 (32.9)	88.3 (31.3)	84.5 (29.2)	75.0 (23.9)	62.6 (17.0)	54.0 (12.2)	72.0 (22.2)
Mean daily minimum °F (°C)	21.9 (−5.6)	24.5 (−4.2)	27.8 (−2.3)	32.5 (0.3)	38.2 (3.4)	46.0 (7.8)	56.3 (13.5)	55.0 (12.8)	48.3 (9.1)	37.6 (3.1)	26.9 (−2.8)	23.4 (−4.8)	36.5 (2.5)
Average precipitation inches (mm)	1.83 (46)	1.56 (40)	1.65 (42)	0.88 (22)	0.46 (12)	0.55 (14)	2.39 (61)	2.98 (76)	1.80 (46)	1.67 (42)	1.20 (30)	1.55 (39)	18.52 (470)
Average snowfall inches (cm)	6.3 (16)	3.0 (7.6)	3.4 (8.6)	0.7 (1.8)	0.1 (0.25)	0.0 (0.0)	0.0 (0.0)	0.0 (0.0)	0.0 (0.0)	0.1 (0.25)	1.6 (4.1)	3.2 (8.1)	18.5 (47)
Average precipitation days (≥ 0.01 in)	6	5	5	4	2	2	8	9	5	4	3	5	59
Source: WRCC

== Demographics ==
Historical population
Census	Pop.	Note	%±
2000	1,331		—
2010	1,713		28.7%
2020	1,816		6.0%
U.S. Decennial Census

=== 2020 census ===
As of the 2020 census, Cibecue had a population of 1,816. The median age was 26.1 years. 38.3% of residents were under the age of 18 and 7.4% of residents were 65 years of age or older. For every 100 females there were 90.6 males, and for every 100 females age 18 and over there were 94.1 males age 18 and over.

0.0% of residents lived in urban areas, while 100.0% lived in rural areas.

There were 427 households in Cibecue, of which 54.1% had children under the age of 18 living in them. Of all households, 29.7% were married-couple households, 21.1% were households with a male householder and no spouse or partner present, and 38.6% were households with a female householder and no spouse or partner present. About 18.2% of all households were made up of individuals and 4.7% had someone living alone who was 65 years of age or older.

There were 470 housing units, of which 9.1% were vacant. The homeowner vacancy rate was 0.0% and the rental vacancy rate was 5.1%.

Racial composition as of the 2020 census
Race	Number	Percent
White	15	0.8%
Black or African American	4	0.2%
American Indian and Alaska Native	1,762	97.0%
Asian	20	1.1%
Native Hawaiian and Other Pacific Islander	0	0.0%
Some other race	2	0.1%
Two or more races	13	0.7%
Hispanic or Latino (of any race)	22	1.2%

=== 2000 census ===
Languages (2000)	Percent
Spoke Apache at home	87.2%
Spoke English at home	12.8%

As of the census of 2000, there were 1,331 people, 323 households, and 268 families residing in the CDP. The population density was 223.1 inhabitants per square mile (86.1/km^{2}). There were 344 housing units at an average density of 57.7 per square mile (22.3/km^{2}). The racial makeup of the CDP was 96.0% Native American, 2.6% White, 0.1% Black or African American, 0.2% Asian, 0.2% from other races, and 0.9% from two or more races. 2.0% of the population were Hispanic or Latino of any race.

There were 323 households, out of which 54.8% had children under the age of 18 living with them, 41.8% were married couples living together, 34.1% had a female householder with no husband present, and 17.0% were non-families. 13.6% of all households were made up of individuals, and 2.8% had someone living alone who was 65 years of age or older. The average household size was 4.11 and the average family size was 4.45.

In the CDP, the population was spread out, with 45.2% under the age of 18, 10.6% from 18 to 24, 25.9% from 25 to 44, 13.7% from 45 to 64, and 4.7% who were 65 years of age or older. The median age was 21 years. For every 100 females, there were 96.6 males. For every 100 females age 18 and over, there were 93.1 males.

=== Income and poverty ===
The median income for a household in the CDP was $12,286, and the median income for a family was $13,750. Males had a median income of $52,639 versus $21,591 for females. The per capita income for the CDP was $5,941. About 55.7% of families and 68.7% of the population were below the poverty line, including 72.5% of those under age 18 and 70.9% of those age 65 or over.

In 2010, Cibecue had the 18th-lowest median household income of all places in the United States with a population over 1,000.

== Transportation ==
Cibecue Airport is a public use general aviation airport located four nautical miles (7 km) southeast of the central business district of Cibecue.

The White Mountain Apache Tribe operates the Fort Apache Connection Transit, which provides local bus service.

== Education ==
The area is served by the Whiteriver Unified School District, and the Dishchii' Bikoh Community School.

Dishchii'bikoh Community School, (Note: after the Western Apache name for Cibecue) also called the Cibecue Community School, is a small K-12, grant-funded day school in Cibecue, Arizona. It is run by the Fort Apache Agency and is funded by the Bureau of Indian Education. (Note: The Arizona Interscholastic Association lists it as the Fort Apache Agency School District in its directory of member high schools.) The school's superintendent is Juan Aragon. The school is subdivided into an elementary, middle, and high school, each with a separate principal.

== Media ==
Cibecue is the focus of the seminal ethnography by Keith H. Basso entitled "Portraits of the 'Whiteman': Linguistic play and cultural symbols among the Western Apache" (1979).
