= Cibecue Airport =

Airport in Navajo County, Arizona

Cibecue Airport Deeschííʼ Bikoohdi chidí naatʼaʼí ńdinibįįhígi (Navajo)
- IATA: none; ICAO: none; FAA LID: Z95

Summary
- Airport type: Public
- Owner: White Mountain Apache Tribe
- Serves: Cibecue, Arizona
- Elevation AMSL: 5,037 ft (1,535 m)
- Coordinates: 34°00′12″N 110°26′39″W

Map
- Location of airport in Arizona

Runways
Direction	Length		Surface
Direction	ft	m	Surface
7/25	4,200	1,280	Gravel/dirt
- Source: Federal Aviation Administration

Cibecue Airport (FAA LID: Z95) is a public use airport located 4.6 miles (4.0 nmi; 7.4 km) southeast of the central business district of Cibecue, in Navajo County, Arizona, United States. It is owned by the White Mountain Apache Tribe. This airport is included in the National Plan of Integrated Airport Systems, which categorized it as a general aviation facility.

== Facilities and aircraft ==
Cibecue Airport covers an area of 163 acres (66 ha) at an elevation of 5,037 feet (1,535 m) above mean sea level. It has one runway designated 7/25 with a gravel and dirt surface measuring 4,200 by 100 feet (1,280 x 30 m).

== See also ==
- List of airports in Arizona
