= Rock the Canyon =

Annual art/music festival held in Shonto, Arizona

- Genre: Alternative rock Alternative metal Blues; Country; Gospel; Nu metal Techno; Native American music
- Venue: Eddie Shootinglady Pavilion
- Locations: Shonto, Arizona; Navajo Nation
- Years active: 2009–present
- Founders: Shonto Tourism Commission (under Shonto Community Governance)

Rock the Canyon: Art & Music Festival (also Shonto's Rock the Canyon) is an annual art/music/cultural festival held in Shonto, Arizona, on the Navajo Nation. Established in 2009 by the Shonto Tourism Commission, a subdivision of Shonto Community Governance, to promote Native American/Indigenous artists and musicians. As well as community wellness and intercultural celebration. The Rock the Canyon festival is currently coordinated by Shonto Group Incorporated.

== Event history ==
No.	Dates	Location	Venue	Featured Artist(s)	Music Performer(s)
1st	September 5, 2009	Shonto Canyon; Shonto, Arizona		Shonto Begay	Open Mic
2nd	2010	Shonto Canyon; Shonto, Arizona		Baje Whitethorne, Sr.	
3rd	June 4, 2011	Shonto Canyon; Shonto, Arizona		Al Bahe	
4th	2012	Shonto Canyon; Shonto, Arizona		John Bahe Smith	
5th	2013	Shonto Canyon; Shonto, Arizona		Tony Begay	
6th	June 4, 2014	Shonto Canyon; Shonto, Arizona	Eddie Shootinglady Pavilion	Alice Cling	
7th	June 6, 2015	Shonto Canyon; Shonto, Arizona	Eddie Shootinglady Pavilion	Delvin Slick	
8th	June 4, 2016	Shonto Canyon; Shonto, Arizona	Eddie Shootinglady Pavilion	Pauline Todicheenie	
9th	June 3, 2017	Shonto Canyon; Shonto, Arizona	Eddie Shootinglady Pavilion	Pauline Bigman	
10th	June 2, 2018	Shonto Canyon; Shonto, Arizona	Eddie Shootinglady Pavilion	Bahe Whitethorne, Jr. (posthumous)	
11th	June 1, 2019	Shonto Canyon; Shonto, Arizona	Eddie Shootinglady Pavilion	Daniel Josley	Indigenous; Joe Tohonnie Jr. & White Mountain Apache Crown Dancers
	2020–2021	Festival cancelled due to the COVID-19 pandemic			
	2022–2025	Festival on Hiatus			
12th	August 29, 2026	Shonto Canyon; Shonto, Arizona	Eddie Shootinglady Pavilion	none	Coalition; Deion Hayes; I Don’t Konform; Irv Wauneka; Sunburnt Stone; Radmilla Cody
13th	June 5, 2027	Shonto Canyon; Shonto, Arizona	Eddie Shootinglady Pavilion	TBA	TBA

== See also ==
- Monument Valley Film Festival
