= Shonto Preparatory School =

Coordinates: 36°36′09″N 110°39′30″W

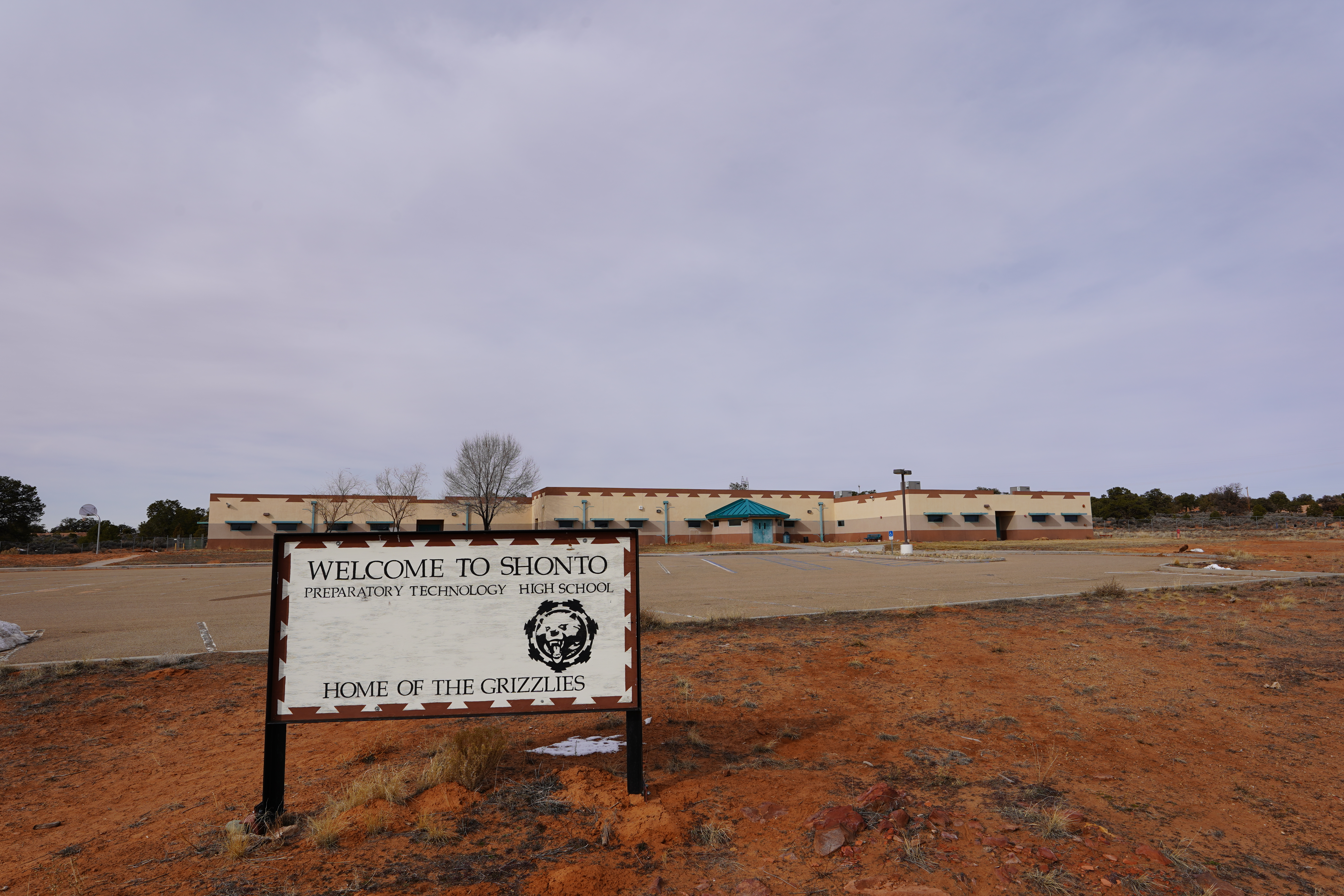
- Shonto, Arizona 86054; United States

Information
- School type: Public high school
- Motto: T’áá shí ánísht’téego t’eiyá íhwiidesh ‘ááł (It’s all up to me to learn)
- Established: 1997 (29 years ago)
- CEEB code: 030448
- Principal: Cheryl Grass (acting)
- Grades: 9–12
- Enrollment: 73 (January 2020)
- Colors: Purple, white, and gold
- Mascot: Grizzlies
- Website: www.shontoprep.org

Shonto Preparatory School is a K–12 school system in Shonto, Arizona. The Shonto Preparatory School district includes a K–8 Bureau of Indian Affairs grant school and Shonto Preparatory Technology High School, a charter high school.

== History ==
The Indian Affairs education facilities were founded in 1933 out of a local desire to have students attend a school closer to home. It moved to its current location in 1966. The Shonto Boarding School, as it was called, became a BIA/charter school in 1996, and the charter high school was added in 1997. The school serves students from rural areas such as Black Mesa, Inscription House, Kaibeto, Kayenta and Tonalea, with students being bused in from as far as 40 miles (64 km) away.

== SPTHS Today ==
The current high school building was built in 2005–2006. It includes 16 classrooms, 2 vocational classrooms, and multi-purpose room known as the Cafetorium.

It has a boarding facility.

=== Departments ===
Departments of Shonto Preparatory Technology High School include:

- English
- Mathematics
- Science
- Social Studies
- Physical Education
- Art/Computer Graphics
- Diné Studies
- Career and Technical Education
- Exceptional Student Services (special education)

=== Staff ===
The Current Building staff consists of nine certified teachers, one per each department. The office has a student service technician, a registrar/administrative assistant, and a principal.

The school has 73 students. All of the students are Native American, and over 90% are eligible for free or reduced lunch programs.

== Athletics ==
Shonto Preparatory Technology High School has a growing, competitive athletic program. The school competes as part of the Arizona Interscholastic Association in the 1A North Conference for basketball and volleyball and in Division IV for cross country, wrestling, and track and field.

=== Fall sports ===
- Cross Country
- Volleyball

=== Winter sports ===
- Basketball
- Wrestling

=== Spring sports ===
- Track and Field
- chest
