= Woodruff, Arizona =

Unincorporated community in the state of Arizona, United States

- Unincorporated community
- Location of Woodruff in Navajo County, Arizona.

- Location within Arizona Location within the United States
- Coordinates: 34°46′53″N 110°02′26″W
- Country: United States
- State: Arizona
- County: Navajo

Area
  - Total: 5.78 sq mi (14.98 km^{2})
  - Land: 5.77 sq mi (14.94 km^{2})
  - Water: 0.015 sq mi (0.04 km^{2})
- Elevation: 5,151 ft (1,570 m)

Population (2010)
  - Total: 191
- Time zone: UTC-7 (Mountain (MST))
- ZIP code: 85942
- Area code: 928
- GNIS feature ID: 2582910

Woodruff is an unincorporated community in Navajo County, Arizona, United States. Woodruff is 10.5 miles (16.9 km) southeast of Holbrook. Woodruff has a post office with ZIP code 85942.

Woodruff was settled in 1876 by a group of members of the Church of Jesus Christ of Latter-day Saints led by Nathan Tenney and including Tenney's son Ammon M. Tenney. It was initially called Tenney's Settlement. In 1878 Lorenzo H. Hatch became the head of the LDS branch there. At that point it was named Woodruff after Wilford Woodruff.

== Demographics ==
Historical population
Census	Pop.	Note	%±
2010	191		—
2020	154		−19.4%
U.S. Decennial Census

As of the census of 2010, there were 191 people, 65 households, and 49 families residing in Woodruff.

== Education ==
It is in the Holbrook Unified School District. The zoned high school is Holbrook High School.
