= Pinetop Country Club, Arizona =

- CDP
- Location within the state of Arizona Pinetop Country Club (the United States)
- Coordinates: 34°06′59″N 109°53′28″W
- Country: United States
- State: Arizona
- County: Navajo

Area
  - Total: 6.73 sq mi (17.42 km^{2})
  - Land: 6.73 sq mi (17.42 km^{2})
  - Water: 0 sq mi (0.00 km^{2})
- Elevation: 7,212 ft (2,198 m)

Population (2020)
  - Total: 1,409
  - Density: 209.5/sq mi (80.89/km^{2})
- Time zone: UTC-7 (MST)
- Area code: 928
- FIPS code: 04-55880
- GNIS feature ID: 2582845

Pinetop Country Club is a census-designated place (CDP) located in Navajo County, Arizona, United States. The population was 1,794 at the 2010 census.

== Geography ==
According to the United States Geological Survey, the CDP has a total area of 6.75 square miles (17.5 km^{2}), all land.

== Demographics ==
Historical population
Census	Pop.	Note	%±
2020	1,409		—
U.S. Decennial Census

=== 2020 census ===
As of the 2020 census, Pinetop Country Club had a population of 1,409. The median age was 62.4 years. 12.2% of residents were under the age of 18 and 43.6% of residents were 65 years of age or older. For every 100 females there were 94.3 males, and for every 100 females age 18 and over there were 97.9 males age 18 and over.

96.1% of residents lived in urban areas, while 3.9% lived in rural areas.

There were 680 households in Pinetop Country Club, of which 14.6% had children under the age of 18 living in them. Of all households, 58.7% were married-couple households, 17.5% were households with a male householder and no spouse or partner present, and 19.9% were households with a female householder and no spouse or partner present. About 30.3% of all households were made up of individuals and 17.5% had someone living alone who was 65 years of age or older.

There were 3,075 housing units, of which 77.9% were vacant. The homeowner vacancy rate was 7.2% and the rental vacancy rate was 38.4%.

Racial composition as of the 2020 census
Race	Number	Percent
White	1,234	87.6%
Black or African American	7	0.5%
American Indian and Alaska Native	37	2.6%
Asian	18	1.3%
Native Hawaiian and Other Pacific Islander	3	0.2%
Some other race	26	1.8%
Two or more races	84	6.0%
Hispanic or Latino (of any race)	107	7.6%

=== 2010 census ===
As of the 2010 census, there were 1794 people living in the CDP: 887 male and 907 female. 349 were 19 years old or younger, 145 were ages 20-34, 234 were between the ages of 35 and 49, 576 were between 50 and 64, and the remaining 490 were aged 65 and above. The median age was 55.4 years.

The racial makeup of the CDP was 91.1% White, 2.7% American Indian, 1.1% Asian, 0.3% Native Hawaiians or Other Pacific Islander, 0.2% Black or African American, 3.0% Other, and 1.5% two or more races. 10.2% of the population were Hispanic or Latino of any race.

There were 805 households in the CDP, 558 family households (69.3%) and 237 non-family households (30.7%), with an average household size of 2.23. Of the family households, 495 were married couples living together, while there were 23 single fathers and 40 single mothers; the non-family households included 205 adults living alone: 88 male and 117 female.

The CDP contained 3,789 housing units, of which 805 were occupied and 2,984 were vacant.

=== Income and poverty ===
As of July 2016, the average home value in Pinetop Country Club was $328,278. The average household income was $74,592, with a per capita income of $41,489.
