= East Fork, Arizona =

CDP in Navajo County, Arizona

- CDP
- Location in Navajo County and the state of Arizona

- Location in the United States
- Coordinates: 33°48′29″N 109°55′22″W
- Country: United States
- State: Arizona
- County: Navajo

Area
  - Total: 2.06 sq mi (5.34 km^{2})
  - Land: 2.06 sq mi (5.34 km^{2})
  - Water: 0 sq mi (0.00 km^{2})
- Elevation: 5,351 ft (1,631 m)

Population (2020)
  - Total: 672
  - Density: 326.0/sq mi (125.86/km^{2})
- Time zone: UTC-7 (MST)
- ZIP code: 85941
- Area code: 928
- FIPS code: 04-21310
- GNIS feature ID: 2408706

East Fork (Western Apache: Hawúʼishįįhé) is a census-designated place (CDP) in Navajo County, Arizona, United States, on the Fort Apache Indian Reservation. The population was 699 at the 2010 census.

== Geography ==
According to the United States Census Bureau, the CDP has a total area of 2.9 square miles (7.5 km^{2}), all land.

== Demographics ==
Historical population
Census	Pop.	Note	%±
2000	880		—
2010	699		−20.6%
2020	672		−3.9%
U.S. Decennial Census

As of the census of 2000, there were 880 people, 209 households, and 169 families living in the CDP. The population density was 305.9 inhabitants per square mile (118.1/km^{2}). There were 228 housing units at an average density of 79.3 per square mile (30.6/km^{2}). The racial makeup of the CDP was 99.6% Native American, 0.5% White, and no Black/African American, Asian, Pacific Islander, other races, or two or more races. 0.7% of the population were Hispanic or Latino of any race.

There were 209 households, out of which 41.1% had children under the age of 18 living with them, 41.6% were married couples living together, 29.7% had a female householder with no husband present, and 19.1% were non-families. 16.3% of all households were made up of individuals, and 1.4% had someone living alone who was 65 years of age or older. The average household size was 4.21 and the average family size was 4.64.

In the CDP, the population was spread out, with 40.7% under the age of 18, 10.7% from 18 to 24, 26.4% from 25 to 44, 17.6% from 45 to 64, and 4.7% who were 65 years of age or older. The median age was 24 years. For every 100 females, there were 96.9 males. For every 100 females age 18 and over, there were 100.8 males.

The median income for a household in the CDP was $15,208, and the median income for a family was $20,000. Males had a median income of $14,125 versus $16,034 for females. The per capita income for the CDP was $4,772. About 44.0% of families and 53.9% of the population were below the poverty line, including 57.1% of those under age 18 and 72.5% of those age 65 or over.

== Education ==
East Fork is served by the Whiteriver Unified School District.

== Transportation ==
The White Mountain Apache Tribe operates the Fort Apache Connection Transit, which provides local bus service.
