= Wagon Wheel, Arizona =

CDP in Navajo County, Arizona

- CDP
- Location of Wagon Wheel in Navajo County, Arizona.

- Location in the United States
- Coordinates: 34°11′51″N 110°01′38″W
- Country: United States
- State: Arizona
- County: Navajo

Government
  - Mayor: Straw Tim

Area
  - Total: 2.53 sq mi (6.56 km^{2})
  - Land: 2.53 sq mi (6.56 km^{2})
  - Water: 0 sq mi (0.00 km^{2})
- Elevation: 6,641 ft (2,024 m)

Population (2020)
  - Total: 1,856
  - Density: 732.6/sq mi (282.85/km^{2})
- Time zone: UTC-7 (MST (no DST))
- FIPS code: 04-80380
- GNIS feature ID: 2582893

Wagon Wheel is a census-designated place in Navajo County, in the U.S. state of Arizona. The population was 1,652 at the 2010 census. It is located between Show Low and Pinetop-Lakeside.

== Demographics ==
Historical population
| Census | Pop. | Note | %± |
|---|---|---|---|
| 2010 | 1,652 | | — |
| 2020 | 1,856 | | 12.3% |
U.S. Decennial Census

=== 2020 census ===
As of the 2020 census, Wagon Wheel had a population of 1,856. The median age was 54.5 years. 17.2% of residents were under the age of 18 and 33.5% of residents were 65 years of age or older. For every 100 females there were 94.8 males, and for every 100 females age 18 and over there were 89.5 males age 18 and over.

98.9% of residents lived in urban areas, while 1.1% lived in rural areas.

There were 762 households in Wagon Wheel, of which 22.4% had children under the age of 18 living in them. Of all households, 50.5% were married-couple households, 19.4% were households with a male householder and no spouse or partner present, and 24.0% were households with a female householder and no spouse or partner present. About 28.3% of all households were made up of individuals and 16.5% had someone living alone who was 65 years of age or older.

There were 1,306 housing units, of which 41.7% were vacant. The homeowner vacancy rate was 2.9% and the rental vacancy rate was 27.3%.

Racial composition as of the 2020 census
| Race | Number | Percent |
|---|---|---|
| White | 1,541 | 83.0% |
| Black or African American | 4 | 0.2% |
| American Indian and Alaska Native | 77 | 4.1% |
| Asian | 15 | 0.8% |
| Native Hawaiian and Other Pacific Islander | 1 | 0.1% |
| Some other race | 58 | 3.1% |
| Two or more races | 160 | 8.6% |
| Hispanic or Latino (of any race) | 262 | 14.1% |

=== 2010 census ===
As of the census of 2010, there were 1,652 people, 680 households, and 434 families living in the CDP.
