= Sun Valley, Arizona =

- Unincorporated community and Census-designated place
- Location of Sun Valley in Navajo County, Arizona.

- Location within Arizona
- Coordinates: 34°59′01″N 110°02′00″W
- Country: United States
- State: Arizona
- County: Navajo

Area
  - Total: 31.61 sq mi (81.87 km^{2})
  - Land: 31.56 sq mi (81.74 km^{2})
  - Water: 0.050 sq mi (0.13 km^{2})
- Elevation: 5,305 ft (1,617 m)

Population (2010)
  - Total: 316
- Time zone: UTC-7 (Mountain (MST))
- ZIP code: 86029
- Area code: 928
- GNIS feature ID: 2582872

Sun Valley is a populated place in Navajo County, Arizona, United States, east of Holbrook along Interstate 40. It is located in the Painted Desert and covers an area of 31.6 square miles.

== History ==
"Sun Valley has always been a sleepy community along the old western highway of Old Route 66 and the newer Interstate 40. Not much is known about the settlement and how its roots began as a community, but it has and still remains largely rural and sparsely populated. Cattle Ranching has been one of the largest agricultural activity in the area. There are still some large tracts or ranch land around Sun Valley and cattle roam the open range of the landscape."

== Demographics ==
Historical population
| Census | Pop. | Note | %± |
|---|---|---|---|
| 2010 | 316 | | — |
| 2020 | 153 | | −51.6% |
U.S. Decennial Census

As of the census of 2010, there were 316 people, 88 households, and 56 families residing in Sun Valley.

== Education ==
It is in the Holbrook Unified School District. The zoned high school is Holbrook High School.
