= Pinon High School =

Location
- 1 Mile North Navajo Route 4 Pinon, Arizona 86510; United States; 36°06′57″N 110°12′57″W

Information
- School type: Public high school
- Motto: "Every Learner, Future Ready"
- Established: 1996 (30 years ago)
- School district: Pinon Unified School District
- CEEB code: 030333
- Principal: Timothy Nelson
- Teaching staff: 21.00 (FTE)
- Grades: 9-12
- Enrollment: 340 (2023-2024)
- Student to teacher ratio: 16.19
- Colors: Black, teal and silver
- Mascot: Eagles
- Website: www.pusdatsa.org/page/about-us-2

Pinon High School is a high school in Pinon, Arizona. It is the only high school under the jurisdiction of the Piñon Unified School District, which also includes an elementary and middle school.
