= Oljato =

Oljato may refer to:

- 2201 Oljato, a minor planet
- Oljato Trading Post, a trading post located in Utah

== See also ==
- Oljato-Monument Valley (disambiguation)
