= Na Ah Tee, Arizona =

- Populated place
- Location within the state of Arizona Na Ah Tee (the United States)
- Coordinates: 35°29′25″N 110°08′40″W
- Country: United States
- State: Arizona
- County: Navajo
- Elevation: 6,263 ft (1,909 m)
- Time zone: UTC-7 (Mountain (MST))
  - Summer (DST): UTC-7 (MST)
- Area code: 928
- FIPS code: 04-48300
- GNIS feature ID: 24523

Na Ah Tee, historically also known as Na-Ah-Tee Canyon, Na-a-tih Trading Post, and Na-at-tee Canyon, is a populated place situated in Navajo County, Arizona, United States.
