= Birdsprings, Arizona =

Populated place in Navajo County, Arizona

Coordinates: 35°18′22″N 110°46′03″W

Birdsprings (Navajo: Tsídi to'ii) is a settlement in unincorporated Navajo County, Arizona, north of Winslow. The Little Colorado River runs through Birdsprings. It is in the southwestern portion of the Navajo Nation reservation and is part of District 5. The name Birdsprings is in reference to spring that at one time drew birds. The community is small and has a chapter, which was established on December 5, 1955.

== Education ==
The Flagstaff Unified School District is the local school district. Residents attend Leupp Elementary School.

There is a tribal elementary school called Little Singer Community School, affiliated with the Bureau of Indian Education (BIE). Hataalii Yazhi, a medicine man, in the 1970s proposed establishing the school so area children did not have to travel far for their education. The school was named after him. The original buildings used two geodesic domes as features. In 2014 the school had 81 students. By 2014 the original campus was described by the Associated Press as being in poor repair. In 2004 the school first asked the BIE to get funding for a new building. The current campus had a cost of $28 million and an area of 32,000 square feet (3,000 m^{2}). It uses intersecting circles as an architectural feature. The current building was dedicated in November 2020. It is physically in an unincorporated area 6 miles (9.7 km) southeast of Birdsprings, and has a postal address of Winslow. It is not in proximity to any road with pavement nor to any gas station.
