= Norton, Arizona =

- Populated place
- Location within the state of Arizona Norton (the United States)
- Coordinates: 32°48′38″N 113°47′56″W
- Country: United States
- State: Arizona
- County: Yuma
- Elevation: 315 ft (96 m)
- Time zone: UTC-7 (Mountain (MST))
  - Summer (DST): UTC-7 (MST)
- Area code: 928
- FIPS code: 04-50250
- GNIS feature ID: 24539

Norton is a location in Yuma County, Arizona, United States. It is located in the northeast San Cristobal Valley, directly south of the Roll Industrial Lead. It has an estimated elevation of 315 feet (96 m) above sea level. In the early 20th century, it was on the main road between Yuma and Phoenix. In 1920, there were 38 inhabitants of the "Norton Precinct". A 1923 publication reported that there were some ranch buildings and one closed store that once held a post office. The Norton post office was discontinued in 1925.
