= Oljato-Monument Valley, Arizona =

CDP in Navajo County, Arizona

Oljato-Monument Valley, Arizona Ooljééʼtó (Navajo)
- Location in Navajo County and the state of Arizona

- Location in the United States
- Coordinates: 36°59′31″N 110°11′5″W
- Country: United States
- State: Arizona
- Counties: Navajo

Area
  - Total: 12.32 sq mi (31.91 km^{2})
  - Land: 12.32 sq mi (31.91 km^{2})
  - Water: 0 sq mi (0.00 km^{2})
- Elevation: 5,309 ft (1,618 m)

Population (2020)
  - Total: 115
  - Density: 9.3/sq mi (3.6/km^{2})
- Time zone: UTC-7 (MST)
  - Summer (DST): UTC-6 (MDT)
- ZIP code: 86033
- Area code: 928
- FIPS Code: 04-51142
- GNIS feature ID: 2408987

Oljato-Monument Valley (Navajo: Ooljééʼtó) is a census-designated place (CDP) in Navajo County, Arizona, United States. The population was 154 at the 2010 census.

== Geography ==
According to the United States Census Bureau, the CDP has a total area of 12.5 square miles (32.4 km^{2}), all land.

== Demographics ==
Historical population
Census	Pop.	Note	%±
2000	155		—
2010	154		−0.6%
2020	115		−25.3%
U.S. Decennial Census

As of the census of 2000, there were 155 people, 37 households, and 33 families living in the CDP. The population density was 12.4 inhabitants per square mile (4.8/km^{2}). There were 58 housing units at an average density of 4.6 per square mile (1.8/km^{2}). The racial makeup of the CDP was 0.6% White, 94.2% Native American, and 5.2% from two or more races.

There were 37 households, out of which 59.5% had children under the age of 18 living with them, 48.6% were married couples living together, 32.4% had a female householder with no husband present, and 10.8% were non-families. 10.8% of all households were made up of individuals, and 2.7% had someone living alone who was 65 years of age or older. The average household size was 4.19 and the average family size was 4.52.

In the CDP, the population was spread out, with 45.8% under the age of 18, 10.3% from 18 to 24, 29.0% from 25 to 44, 8.4% from 45 to 64, and 6.5% who were 65 years of age or older. The median age was 21 years. For every 100 females, there were 101.3 males. For every 100 females age 18 and over, there were 90.9 males.

The median income for a household in the CDP was $6,406, and the median income for a family was $12,813. Males had a median income of $0 versus $0 for females. The per capita income for the CDP was $4,702. About 42.9% of families and 53.8% of the population were below the poverty line, including 27.3% of those under the age of 18 and 52.9% of those 65 or older.

== Education ==
Oljato is served by the Kayenta Unified School District.

Kayenta Primary School, Kayenta Intermediate School, Kayenta Middle School, and Monument Valley High School serve the community.

== In popular culture ==
The cover art for Irish rock band The Cranberries’ 1999 album Bury the Hatchet was taken in Monument Valley.

== See also ==
- List of census-designated places in Arizona
- Oljato–Monument Valley, Utah
