= Rainbow City, Arizona =

Census-designated place in Navajo County, Arizona, United States

- Census-designated place
- Location of Rainbow City in Navajo County, Arizona.

- Location in the United States
- Coordinates: 33°52′33″N 109°58′36″W
- Country: United States
- State: Arizona
- County: Navajo

Area
  - Total: 2.18 sq mi (5.64 km^{2})
  - Land: 2.18 sq mi (5.64 km^{2})
  - Water: 0 sq mi (0.00 km^{2})
- Elevation: 5,781 ft (1,762 m)

Population (2020)
  - Total: 1,001
  - Density: 459.7/sq mi (177.51/km^{2})
- Time zone: UTC-7 (MST (no DST))
- ZIP code: 85941
- Area code: 928
- FIPS code: 04-58620
- GNIS feature ID: 2582847

Rainbow City is a census-designated place (CDP) on the Fort Apache Indian Reservation in Navajo County, Arizona, United States. The population was 968 at the 2010 census.

== Demographics ==
Historical population
Census	Pop.	Note	%±
2010	968		—
2020	1,001		3.4%
U.S. Decennial Census

=== 2020 census ===
As of the 2020 census, Rainbow City had a population of 1,001. The median age was 28.9 years. 35.9% of residents were under the age of 18 and 7.8% of residents were 65 years of age or older. For every 100 females there were 87.8 males, and for every 100 females age 18 and over there were 92.8 males age 18 and over.

0.0% of residents lived in urban areas, while 100.0% lived in rural areas.

There were 217 households in Rainbow City, of which 58.5% had children under the age of 18 living in them. Of all households, 30.4% were married-couple households, 17.5% were households with a male householder and no spouse or partner present, and 41.5% were households with a female householder and no spouse or partner present. About 11.6% of all households were made up of individuals and 5.5% had someone living alone who was 65 years of age or older.

There were 234 housing units, of which 7.3% were vacant. The homeowner vacancy rate was 0.0% and the rental vacancy rate was 0.0%.

Racial composition as of the 2020 census
Race	Number	Percent
White	1	0.1%
Black or African American	0	0.0%
American Indian and Alaska Native	989	98.8%
Asian	0	0.0%
Native Hawaiian and Other Pacific Islander	0	0.0%
Some other race	6	0.6%
Two or more races	5	0.5%
Hispanic or Latino (of any race)	14	1.4%

=== 2010 census ===
As of the census of 2010, there were 968 people, 223 households, and 192 families living in the CDP.

== See also ==
- List of census-designated places in Arizona
