= Nawt Vaya, Arizona =

- Populated place
- Location within the state of Arizona Nawt Vaya (the United States)
- Coordinates: 32°01′59″N 111°29′20″W
- Country: United States
- State: Arizona
- County: Pima
- Elevation: 2,920 ft (890 m)
- Time zone: UTC-7 (Mountain (MST))
  - Summer (DST): UTC-7 (MST)
- Area code: 520
- FIPS code: 04-48975
- GNIS feature ID: 24530

Nawt Vaya is a populated place situated on the Tohono O'odham Nation in Pima County, Arizona, United States. Historically, it has also been known as Agua Lavaria, Agua la Vara, Agua la Varia, Alamo, and Not Vaya, before Nawt Vaya became the official name following a decision by the Board on Geographic Names in 1941. The name means pampas grass well in the O'odham language. It has an estimated elevation of 2,920 feet (890 m) above sea level. In the early days of European settlement, a small spring lay nearby at Agua la Vara, from which travelers through the pass obtained water. (Note: Detail to be found on the decision card found on the GNIS link.)
