= Chilchinbito, Arizona =

CDP in Navajo County, Arizona

Chilchinbeto, Arizona Tsiiłchin Biiʼ Tó (Navajo)
- CDP
- Location in Navajo County and the state of Arizona

- Location in the United States
- Coordinates: 36°29′50″N 110°02′50″W
- Country: United States
- State: Arizona
- County: Navajo

Area
  - Total: 23.77 sq mi (61.57 km^{2})
  - Land: 23.76 sq mi (61.54 km^{2})
  - Water: 0.012 sq mi (0.03 km^{2})
- Elevation: 6,021 ft (1,835 m)

Population (2020)
  - Total: 769
  - Density: 32/sq mi (12.5/km^{2})
- Time zone: UTC-7 (MST)
  - Summer (DST): UTC-6 (MDT)
- ZIP code: 86033
- Area code: 928
- FIPS code: 04-12630
- GNIS feature ID: 2408023

Chilchinbeto (Navajo: Tsiiłchin Biiʼ Tó) is a town located on the Navajo Nation, whose lands spans four state boundary lines in the Four Corners region of the United States. The town of Chilchinbeto is a census-designated place (CDP) specifically in Navajo County, Arizona, United States. The population was 506 at the 2010 census. Chilchinbeto is also considered to be the source of coronavirus infections on the Navajo Nation, possibly traced to the annual meeting of the Church of the Nazarene's numerous branches, on March 7, 2020. COVID-19 federal relief funds for medical care on the Navajo Nation were being redirected to a non-Native for-profit corporation, and a legal suit is pending.

== History ==
On March 17, 2020, the first case of the global pandemic of coronavirus disease 2019 (COVID-19) on the Navajo Nation was identified to be a 46-year-old resident of Chilchinbeto by the Arizona Department of Health. The man tested positive for the disease in a hospital in Phoenix after being transferred from the Kayenta Health Center in Kayenta, Arizona. Two days later the Navajo Health Command Operations Center ordered Chilchinbeto to be quarantined and isolated.

== Geography ==
Chilchinbeto has a total area of 23.8 square miles (62 km^{2}), all land.

== Demographics ==
Languages (2000)	Percent
Spoke Navajo at home	89.8%
Spoke English at home	10.2%

Historical population
Census	Pop.	Note	%±
2000	462		—
2010	506		9.5%
2020	769		52.0%
U.S. Decennial Census

As of the census of 2000, there were 462 people, 111 households, and 89 families living in the CDP. The population density was 19.4 inhabitants per square mile (7.5/km^{2}). There were 167 housing units at an average density of 7.0 per square mile (2.7/km^{2}). The racial makeup of the CDP was 98.7% Native American and 1.3% White. None of the population is Hispanic or Latino of any race.

There were 111 households, out of which 46.8% had children under the age of 18 living with them, 53.2% were married couples living together, 18.0% had a female householder with no husband present, and 19.8% were non-families. 18.9% of all households were made up of individuals, and 4.5% had someone living alone who was 65 years of age or older. The average household size had 4.16 members and the average family size was 4.90 members.

In the CDP, the population was spread out, with 42.6% under the age of 18, 13.0% from 18 to 24, 24.0% from 25 to 44, 13.6% from 45 to 64, and 6.7% who were 65 years of age or older. The median age was 21 years. For every 100 females, there were 91.7 males. For every 100 females age 18 and over, there were 100.8 males.

The median income for a household in the CDP was $30,529, and the median income for a family was $31,010. Males had a median income of $19,688 versus $18,516 for females. The per capita income for the CDP was $5,495. About 36.8% of families and 49.5% of the population were below the poverty line, including 42.0% of those under age 18 and 100.0% of those age 65 or over.

== Education ==
Kayenta is served by the Kayenta Unified School District.

Kayenta Primary School, Kayenta Intermediate School, Kayenta Middle School, and Monument Valley High School serve the community.

== See also ==
- List of census-designated places in Arizona
