= Kayenta Unified School District =

School district in the Navajo Nation, Arizona, United States

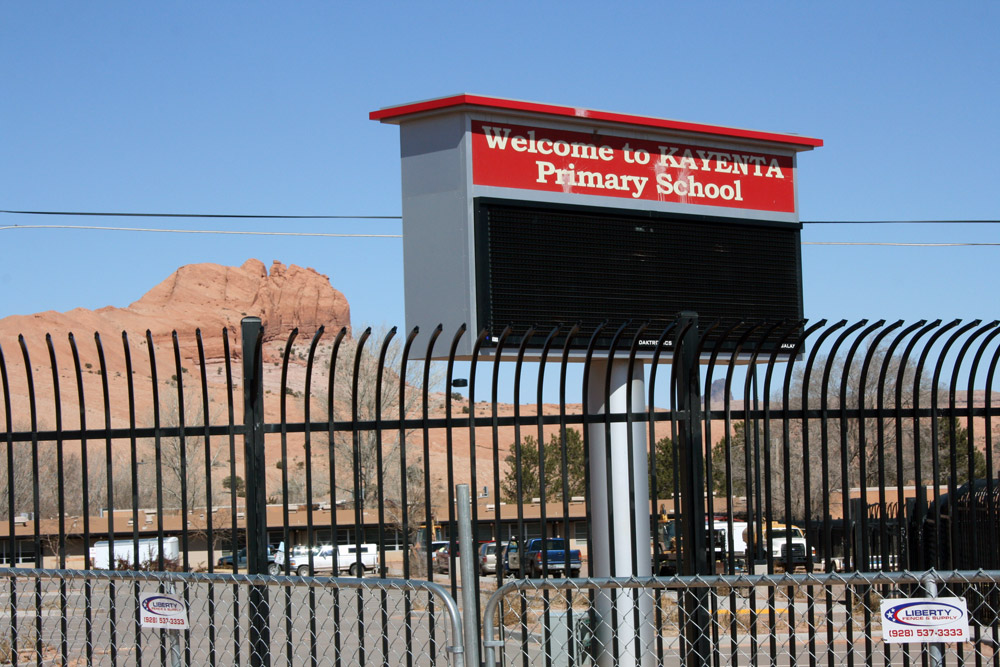
Kayenta Primary School

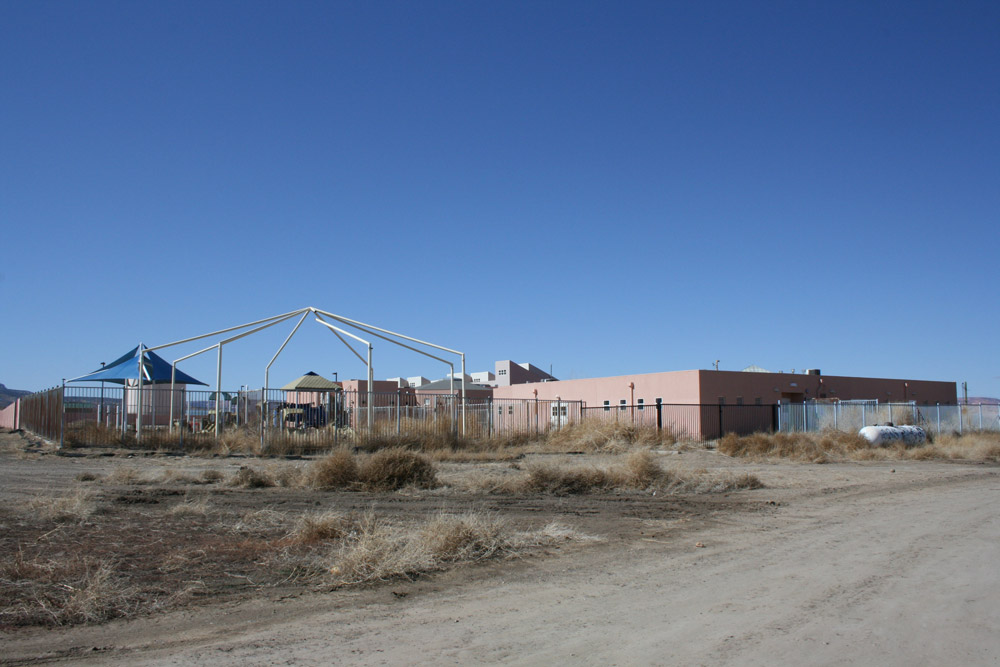
School in Kayenta

Kayenta Unified School District No. 27 is a school district headquartered in Kayenta, Arizona, located on the Navajo Nation.

It operates four schools, including Kayenta Early Childhood Education, Kayenta Elementary School (K–4), Kayenta Middle School (5–8), and Monument Valley High School (9–12). The elementary school is known under two names (the second being Debbie Braff Elementary School), as is the middle school (which has the second name "Baker Middle School").

In addition to Kayenta, the district includes Chilchinbito, Oljato-Monument Valley, and Shonto.

== History ==
In 2013 the district leadership asked voters to approve an "override" of its budget. The measure succeeded, with 464 approving and 95 rejecting, a 83–17% basis.

Previously Kayenta USD had a Kayenta Primary School and a Kayenta Intermediate School.
