= Piñon Unified School District =

School district in Arizona, United States

Piñon Unified School District #4 is a school district located on the Navajo Nation Reservation in Piñon, Arizona, United States. The district consists of one elementary, one middle, and one high school: Pinon Elementary School, Pinon Accelerated Middle School, Pinon High School. The school mascot is the Eagle (Atsá).

Students The majority of students are Navajo (Diné) and live on the Navajo Reservation.
