= Navajo County, Arizona =

County in Arizona, United States

- County
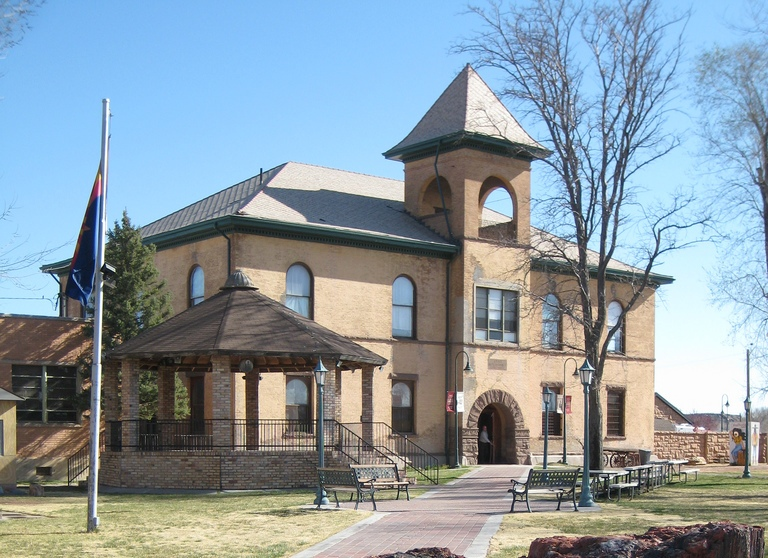
- Historic Navajo County Courthouse and Museum in Holbrook

- Seal

- Location within the U.S. state of Arizona
- Coordinates: 35°29′52″N 110°17′23″W
- Country: United States
- State: Arizona
- Founded: March 21, 1895
- Named for: Navajo Nation
- Seat: Holbrook
- Largest city: Show Low

Area
  - Total: 9,960 sq mi (25,800 km^{2})
  - Land: 9,950 sq mi (25,800 km^{2})
  - Water: 9.3 sq mi (24 km^{2}) 0.09%

Population (2020)
  - Total: 106,717
  - Estimate (2025): 109,946 ▲
  - Density: 10.7/sq mi (4.14/km^{2})
- Time zone: UTC−7 (Mountain)
- Congressional district: 2nd
- Website: www.navajocountyaz.gov

Navajo County (Navajo: Tʼiisyaakin Áłtsʼíísí Bił Hahoodzo) is a county in the northern part of the U.S. state of Arizona. As of the 2020 census, its population was 106,717. The county seat is Holbrook.

Navajo County comprises the Show Low, Arizona Micropolitan Statistical Area.

Navajo County contains parts of the Hopi Indian reservation, the Navajo Nation, and Fort Apache Indian Reservation.

== History ==
Navajo County was split from Apache County on March 21, 1895. The first county sheriff was Commodore Perry Owens, a legendary gunman who had previously served as the sheriff of Apache County. It was the location for many of the events of the Pleasant Valley War.

== Geography ==
According to the United States Census Bureau, the county has a total area of 9,960 square miles (25,800 km^{2}), of which 9,950 square miles (25,800 km^{2}) is land and 9.3 square miles (24 km^{2}) (0.09%) is water.

Navajo County offers not only the Monument Valley, but Keams Canyon, part of the Petrified Forest National Park, and one of the largest contiguous ponderosa pine forests in North America.

Nathan Korhman of The Atlantic described the county, in 2022, as "one of Arizona’s most rural regions", stating that a political canvasser would have to drive to get to a sequential house on a list to target, while in more urban areas such a canvasser would walk from place to place.

=== Adjacent counties ===
- Apache County – east
- Graham County – south
- Gila County – southwest
- Coconino County – west
- San Juan County, Utah – north

=== Indian reservations ===
Navajo County has 6,632.73 square miles (17,178.7 km^{2}) of federally designated Indian reservation within its borders, the third most of any county in the United States (neighboring Apache County and Coconino County are first and second). In descending order of territory within the county, the reservations are the Navajo Nation, Hopi Indian Reservation, and Fort Apache Indian Reservation, all of which are partly located within Navajo County.

=== National protected areas ===
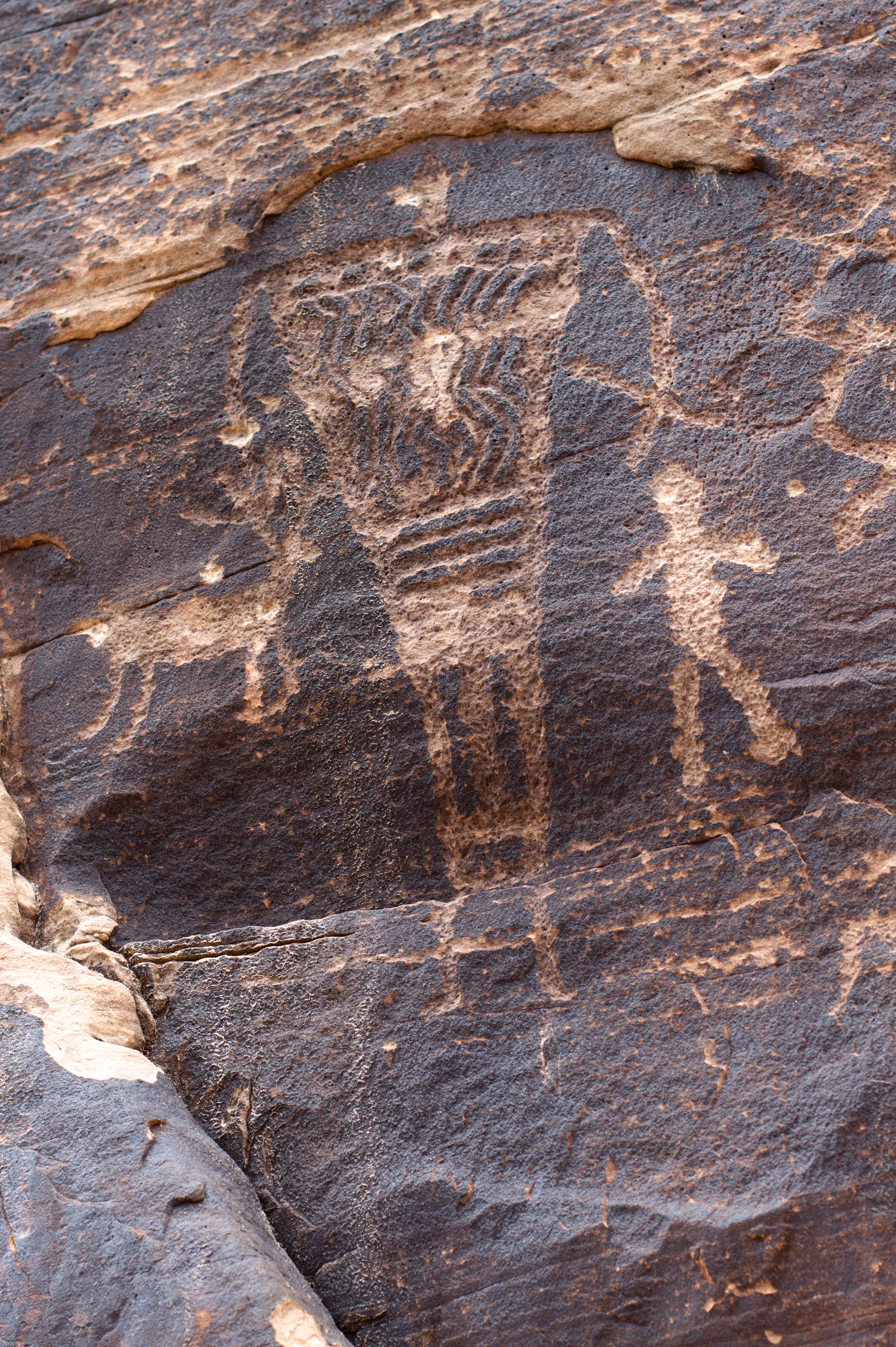
Petroglyphs at Rock Art Canyon Ranch near Winslow

- Apache-Sitgreaves National Forest (part)
- Navajo National Monument
- Petrified Forest National Park (part)

== Demographics ==
Historical population
Census	Pop.	Note	%±
1900	8,829		—
1910	11,471		29.9%
1920	16,077		40.2%
1930	21,202		31.9%
1940	25,309		19.4%
1950	29,446		16.3%
1960	37,994		29.0%
1970	47,715		25.6%
1980	67,629		41.7%
1990	77,658		14.8%
2000	97,470		25.5%
2010	107,449		10.2%
2020	106,717		−0.7%
2025 (est.)	109,946	▲	3.0%
U.S. Decennial Census; 1790–1960 1900–1990; 1990–2000 2010–2020

=== Racial and ethnic composition ===
Navajo County, Arizona – Racial and ethnic composition Note: the US Census treats Hispanic/Latino as an ethnic category. This table excludes Latinos from the racial categories and assigns them to a separate category. Hispanics/Latinos may be of any race.
Race / Ethnicity (NH = Non-Hispanic)	2020	2010	2000	1990	1980
White alone (NH)	42% (44,786)	43.9% (47,181)	42.3% (41,196)	40.2% (31,256)	44.6% (30,162)
Black alone (NH)	0.6% (674)	0.8% (842)	0.8% (794)	0.9% (667)	0.9% (608)
American Indian alone (NH)	43.6% (46,572)	42.4% (45,551)	47% (45,846)	51.2% (39,789)	47.2% (31,938)
Asian alone (NH)	0.5% (548)	0.5% (542)	0.3% (315)	0.3% (245)	0.2% (119)
Pacific Islander alone (NH)	0.1% (68)	0.1% (68)	0% (39)		
Other race alone (NH)	0.2% (232)	0% (44)	0% (29)	0.1% (49)	0.1% (70)
Multiracial (NH)	2.8% (2,950)	1.5% (1,650)	1.3% (1,240)	—	—
Hispanic/Latino (any race)	10.2% (10,887)	10.8% (11,571)	8.2% (8,011)	7.3% (5,652)	7% (4,732)

=== American Community Survey 2025 data ===
The United States Census Bureau estimated that in 2025, Navajo County’s population was 109.946. It was also estimated that the county's population was 42,50% Non-Hispanic White, 11,93% Hispanic or Latino, 0,75% Non-Hispanic Black, 0,73% Asian, 41,35% Native American, 0,10% Pacific Islander, and 2,64% Multiracial.

Total	Population	Percentage
Non-Hispanic White	46.730	42,50%
Hispanic or Latino	13.112	11,93%
Non-Hispanic Black	820	0,75%
Asian	807	0,73%
Native American	45.461	41,35%
Pacific Islander	112	0,10%
Non-Hispanic Multiracial	2.904	2,64%

=== 2020 census ===
As of the 2020 census, the county had a population of 106,717. Of the residents, 25.8% were under the age of 18 and 19.9% were 65 years of age or older; the median age was 39.4 years. For every 100 females there were 99.4 males, and for every 100 females age 18 and over there were 98.1 males. 35.7% of residents lived in urban areas and 64.3% lived in rural areas.

The racial makeup of the county was 45.4% White, 0.7% Black or African American, 44.5% American Indian and Alaska Native, 0.5% Asian, 0.1% Native Hawaiian and Pacific Islander, 3.0% from some other race, and 5.9% from two or more races. Hispanic or Latino residents of any race comprised 10.2% of the population.

There were 36,836 households in the county, of which 33.2% had children under the age of 18 living with them and 28.0% had a female householder with no spouse or partner present. About 25.2% of all households were made up of individuals and 12.0% had someone living alone who was 65 years of age or older.

There were 56,180 housing units, of which 34.4% were vacant. Among occupied housing units, 70.9% were owner-occupied and 29.1% were renter-occupied. The homeowner vacancy rate was 2.4% and the rental vacancy rate was 9.6%.

==== Census of religion ====
Navajo County is among the most religiously diverse places in the United States. A 2020 census by the Public Religion Research Institute (unconnected to the official US census) calculates a religious diversity score of 0.876 for Navajo County, where 1 represents complete diversity (each religious group of equal size) and 0 a total lack of diversity. Only three other counties in the US have higher scores, all much more urban than Navajo County.

=== 2010 census ===
As of the census of 2010, there were 107,449 people, 35,658 households, and 25,923 families living in the county. The population density was 10.8 inhabitants per square mile (4.2/km^{2}). There were 56,938 housing units at an average density of 5.7 units per square mile (2.2 units/km^{2}). The racial makeup of the county was 49.3% white, 43.4% American Indian, 0.9% black or African American, 0.5% Asian, 0.1% Pacific islander, 3.4% from other races, and 2.5% from two or more races. Those of Hispanic or Latino origin made up 10.8% of the population. In terms of ancestry, 13.7% were German, 12.5% were English, 9.3% were Irish, and 2.3% were American.

Of the 35,658 households, 39.2% had children under the age of 18 living with them, 49.1% were married couples living together, 17.1% had a female householder with no husband present, 27.3% were non-families, and 23.0% of all households were made up of individuals. The average household size was 2.95 and the average family size was 3.50. The median age was 34.7 years.

The median income for a household in the county was $39,774 and the median income for a family was $45,906. Males had a median income of $41,516 versus $28,969 for females. The per capita income for the county was $16,745. About 19.1% of families and 24.4% of the population were below the poverty line, including 32.6% of those under age 18 and 12.4% of those age 65 or over.

=== 2000 census ===
As of the census of 2000, there were 97,470 people, 30,043 households, and 23,073 families living in the county. The population density was 10 inhabitants per square mile (3.9/km^{2}). There were 47,413 housing units at an average density of 5/sq mi (1.9/km^{2}). The racial makeup of the county was 47.7% Native American, 45.9% White, 0.9% Black or African American, 0.3% Asian, 0.1% Pacific Islander, 3.2% from other races, and 5.9% from two or more races. 8.2% of the population were Hispanic or Latino of any race. 24.8% reported speaking Navajo at home, 5.9% other Southern Athabaskan languages, 4.7% Spanish, and 3.2% Hopi.

There were 30,043 households, out of which 40.5% had children under the age of 18 living with them, 55.5% were married couples living together, 16.3% had a female householder with no husband present, and 23.2% were non-families. 19.9% of all households were made up of individuals, and 7.2% had someone living alone who was 65 years of age or older. The average household size was 3.17 and the average family size was 3.68.

In the county, the population was spread out, with 35.4% under the age of 18, 8.8% from 18 to 24, 25.3% from 25 to 44, 20.4% from 45 to 64, and 10.0% who were 65 years of age or older. The median age was 30 years. For every 100 females there were 98.7 males. For every 100 females age 18 and over, there were 97.2 males.

The median income for a household in the county was $28,569, and the median income for a family was $32,409. Males had a median income of $30,509 versus $21,621 for females. The per capita income for the county was $11,609. About 23.4% of families and 29.5% of the population were below the poverty line, including 36.6% of those under age 18 and 20.3% of those age 65 or over.

== Politics ==
Navajo County leans towards the Republican Party. The county has not voted Democratic on a presidential level since 1996. Although its Native American population makes up nearly half of the county, a demographic that politically favors those of the Democratic Party, the county has a strong Latter-Day Saint presence (particularly in population centers such as Snowflake) that normally allows Republican candidates to carry the county. The city of Show Low and surrounding areas, as well as Holbrook, also contribute to Republican votes in the county. Notably, the county has become more Republican in recent cycles such as in 2022 and in 2024. In 2024, the city of Winslow, which has long been a Democratic stronghold, saw a heavy Republican shift, as did the area of Pinetop-Lakeside. The Navajo Nation also saw some major Republican trends, mirroring those in neighboring Apache County. On the other hand, the city of Holbrook saw a Democratic trend since 2020.

United States presidential election results for Navajo County, Arizona
Year	Republican		Democratic		Third party(ies)	
Year	No.	%	No.	%	No.	%
1912	168	22.86%	287	39.05%	280	38.10%
1916	574	30.52%	1,240	65.92%	67	3.56%
1920	1,078	51.11%	1,031	48.89%	0	0.00%
1924	1,060	42.90%	684	27.68%	727	29.42%
1928	1,608	54.99%	1,316	45.01%	0	0.00%
1932	1,248	30.10%	2,602	62.76%	296	7.14%
1936	1,052	25.40%	3,037	73.32%	53	1.28%
1940	1,533	33.35%	3,052	66.39%	12	0.26%
1944	1,579	37.14%	2,660	62.56%	13	0.31%
1948	1,841	40.32%	2,669	58.45%	56	1.23%
1952	3,478	57.29%	2,593	42.71%	0	0.00%
1956	3,928	65.80%	2,033	34.05%	9	0.15%
1960	4,090	57.19%	3,052	42.68%	9	0.13%
1964	4,870	50.47%	4,770	49.44%	9	0.09%
1968	4,596	51.00%	2,930	32.51%	1,486	16.49%
1972	6,999	60.48%	4,003	34.59%	570	4.93%
1976	6,796	46.68%	7,323	50.30%	441	3.03%
1980	10,790	63.91%	5,110	30.27%	982	5.82%
1984	11,379	58.12%	8,017	40.95%	182	0.93%
1988	10,393	52.82%	9,023	45.86%	261	1.33%
1992	7,994	32.45%	10,882	44.17%	5,762	23.39%
1996	9,262	37.14%	12,912	51.78%	2,764	11.08%
2000	12,386	49.25%	11,794	46.90%	967	3.85%
2004	17,277	53.32%	14,815	45.72%	312	0.96%
2008	19,761	55.00%	15,579	43.36%	592	1.65%
2012	19,884	53.07%	16,945	45.23%	636	1.70%
2016	20,577	51.07%	16,459	40.85%	3,258	8.09%
2020	27,657	53.41%	23,383	45.16%	743	1.43%
2024	29,480	58.13%	20,754	40.92%	481	0.95%

== Education ==
School districts that serve the county include:

- Blue Ridge Unified School District
- Cedar Unified School District
- Heber-Overgaard Unified School District
- Holbrook Unified School District
- Joseph City Unified School District
- Kayenta Unified School District
- Piñon Unified School District
- Show Low Unified School District
- Snowflake Unified School District
- Whiteriver Unified School District
- Winslow Unified School District

There is a tribal elementary school called Little Singer Community School, affiliated with the Bureau of Indian Education (BIE). Hataalii Yazhi, a medicine man, in the 1970s proposed establishing the school so area children did not have to travel far for their education. The school was named after him. The original buildings used two geodesic domes as features. In 2014 the school had 81 students. By 2014 the original campus was described by the Associated Press as being in poor repair. In 2004 the school first asked the BIE to get funding for a new building. The current campus had a cost of $28 million and an area of 32,000 square feet (3,000 m^{2}). It uses intersecting circles as an architectural feature. The current building was dedicated in November 2020. It is physically in an unincorporated area 6 miles (9.7 km) southeast of Birdsprings, and has a postal address of Winslow.

== Transportation ==
=== Major highways ===
- I-40
  - BL 40 (Joseph City)
  - BL 40 (Holbrook)
  - BS 40 (Winslow)
- US 60
- US 160
- US 163
- US 180
- SR 73
- SR 77
- SR 87
- SR 98
- SR 99
- SR 260
- SR 264
- SR 277
- SR 377
- SR 564

=== Airports ===
The following public-use airports are located within the county:

- Cibecue Airport (Z95) – Cibecue
- Holbrook Municipal Airport (P14) – Holbrook
- Kayenta Airport (0V7) – Kayenta
- Polacca Airport (P10) – Polacca
- Show Low Regional Airport (SOW) – Show Low
- Taylor Airport (TYL) – Taylor
- Whiteriver Airport (E24) – Whiteriver
- Winslow–Lindbergh Regional Airport (INW) – Winslow

== Communities ==
=== Cities ===
- Holbrook (county seat)
- Show Low
- Winslow

=== Towns ===
- Kayenta
- Pinetop-Lakeside
- Snowflake
- Taylor

=== Census-designated places ===
- Chilchinbito
- Cibecue
- Clay Springs
- Dilkon
- East Fork
- First Mesa
- Fort Apache
- Greasewood
- Hard Rock
- Heber-Overgaard
- Hondah
- Hotevilla-Bacavi
- Indian Wells
- Jeddito
- Joseph City
- Keams Canyon
- Kykotsmovi Village
- Lake of the Woods
- Linden
- Low Mountain
- McNary (mostly in Apache County)
- North Fork
- Oljato-Monument Valley
- Pinedale
- Pinetop Country Club
- Pinon
- Rainbow City
- Seba Dalkai
- Second Mesa
- Seven Mile
- Shongopovi
- Shonto
- Shumway
- Sun Valley
- Tees Toh
- Turkey Creek
- Wagon Wheel
- White Mountain Lake
- Whitecone
- Whiteriver
- Winslow West (partially in Coconino County)
- Woodruff

=== Other communities ===
- Birdsprings
- Oraibi

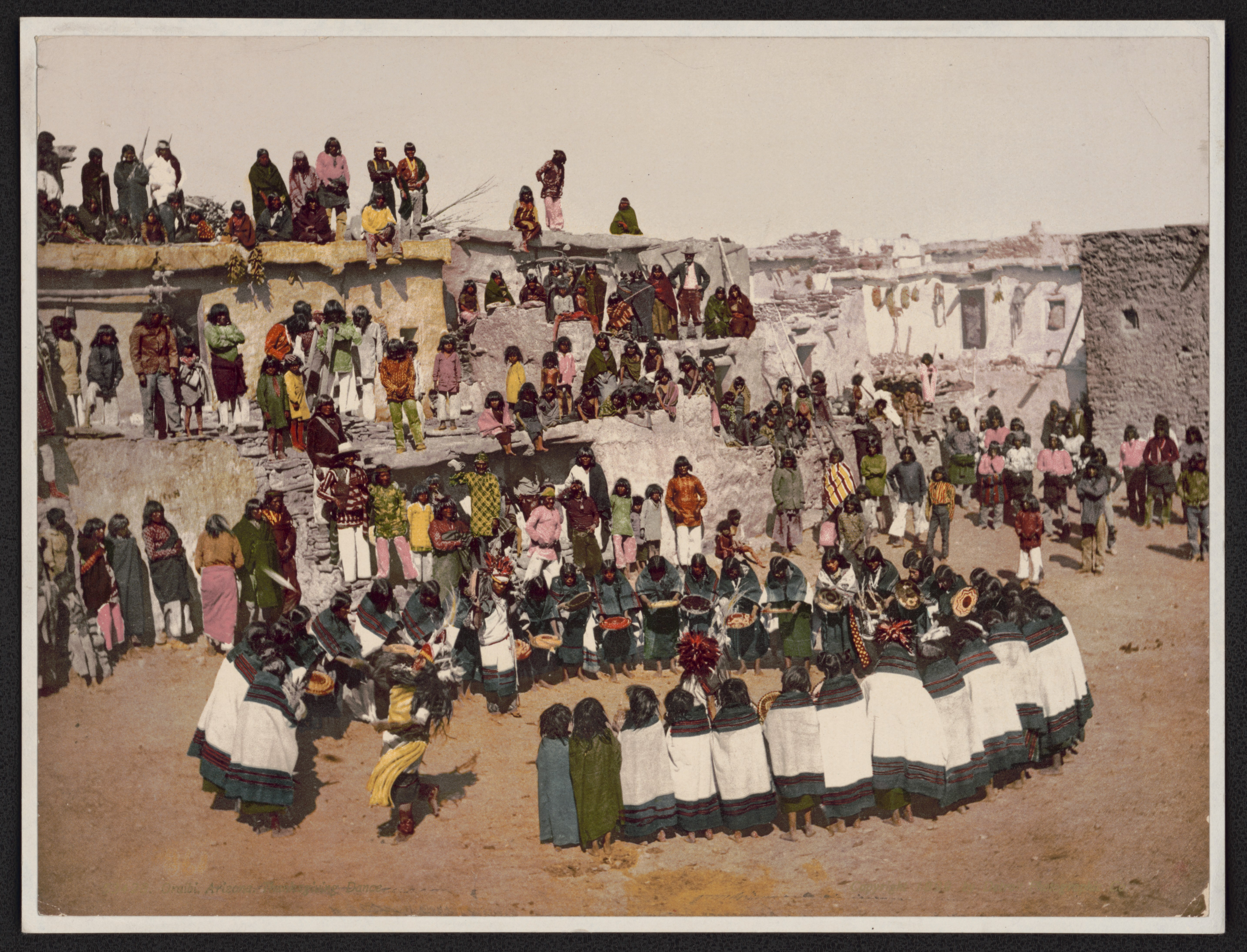
Thanksgiving dance, Oraibi, 1899. Photochrom print by William Henry Jackson

=== Native American communities ===
- Fort Apache Indian Reservation
- Hopi Reservation
- Navajo Nation

=== Other places ===
- Alchesay Flat, a named flat approximately 7 miles (11 km) north of Whiteriver along Arizona State Route 73.

=== Ghost towns ===
- Brigham
- Obed
- Sunset
- Wilford
- Zeniff

=== County population ranking ===
The population ranking of the following table is based on the 2010 census of Navajo County.

† county seat

Rank	City/Town/etc.	Population (2010 Census)	Municipal type	Incorporated
1	Show Low	10,660	City	1953
2	Winslow	9,655	City	1900
3	Snowflake	5,590	Town	1953 (founded 1878)
4	Kayenta	5,189	CDP	
5	† Holbrook	5,053	City	1917
6	Pinetop-Lakeside	4,282	Town	1984
7	Taylor	4,112	Town	1966
8	Whiteriver	4,104	CDP	
9	Lake of the Woods	4,094	CDP	
10	Heber-Overgaard	2,822	CDP	
11	Linden	2,597	CDP	
12	White Mountain Lake	2,205	CDP	
13	Pinetop Country Club	1,794	CDP	
14	Cibecue	1,730	CDP	
15	Wagon Wheel	1,652	CDP	
16	First Mesa	1,555	CDP	
17	North Fork	1,417	CDP	
18	Joseph City	1,386	CDP	
19	Dilkon	1,184	CDP	
20	Rainbow City	968	CDP	
21	Second Mesa	962	CDP	
22	Hotevilla-Bacavi	957	CDP	
23	Pinon	904	CDP	
24	Shongopovi	831	CDP	
25	Whitecone	817	CDP	
26	Hondah	812	CDP	
27	Low Mountain	757	CDP	
28	Kykotsmovi Village	746	CDP	
29	Seven Mile	707	CDP	
30	East Fork	699	CDP	
31	Shonto	591	CDP	
32	Greasewood	547	CDP	
33	McNary (mostly in Apache County)	528	CDP	
34	Chilchinbito	506	CDP	
35	Pinedale	487	CDP	
36	Tees Toh	448	CDP	
37	Winslow West (partially in Coconino County)	438	CDP	
38	Clay Springs	401	CDP	
39	Sun Valley	316	CDP	
40	Keams Canyon	304	CDP	
41	Turkey Creek	294	CDP	
42	Jeddito	293	CDP	
43	Indian Wells	255	CDP	
44	Woodruff	191	CDP	
45	Oljato-Monument Valley	154	CDP	
46	Fort Apache	143	CDP	
47	Seba Dalkai	136	CDP	
48	Hard Rock	94	CDP	

== See also ==
- National Register of Historic Places listings in Navajo County, Arizona
