= Pinon, Arizona =

Pinon, Arizona Beʼekʼid Baa Ahoodzání (Navajo)
- Location of Pinon in Navajo County, Arizona.

- Location in the United States Piñon (the United States)
- Coordinates: 36°06′45″N 110°13′08″W
- Country: United States
- State: Arizona
- Counties: Navajo

Area
  - Total: 6.49 sq mi (16.82 km^{2})
  - Land: 6.48 sq mi (16.79 km^{2})
  - Water: 0.012 sq mi (0.03 km^{2})
- Elevation: 6,336 ft (1,931 m)

Population (2020)
  - Total: 1,084
  - Density: 167.2/sq mi (64.56/km^{2})
- Time zone: UTC-7 (MST)
  - Summer (DST): UTC-6 (MDT)
- ZIP code: 86510
- Area code: 928
- FIPS code: 04-56120
- GNIS feature ID: 2409075

Pinon (Navajo: Beʼekʼid Baa Ahoodzání) is a census-designated place (CDP) in Navajo County, Arizona, United States, and located on the Navajo Nation. The population was 904 at the 2010 census.

== Geography ==
According to the United States Census Bureau, the CDP has a total area of 6.4 square miles (17 km^{2}), all land.

== Demographics ==
Historical population
Census	Pop.	Note	%±
2000	1,190		—
2010	904		−24.0%
2020	1,084		19.9%
U.S. Decennial Census

=== 2020 census ===
As of the 2020 census, Pinon had a population of 1,084. The median age was 30.9 years. 35.1% of residents were under the age of 18 and 12.2% of residents were 65 years of age or older. For every 100 females there were 104.9 males, and for every 100 females age 18 and over there were 90.5 males age 18 and over.

0.0% of residents lived in urban areas, while 100.0% lived in rural areas.

There were 302 households in Pinon, of which 41.7% had children under the age of 18 living in them. Of all households, 36.8% were married-couple households, 20.2% were households with a male householder and no spouse or partner present, and 36.8% were households with a female householder and no spouse or partner present. About 26.5% of all households were made up of individuals and 9.6% had someone living alone who was 65 years of age or older.

There were 362 housing units, of which 16.6% were vacant. The homeowner vacancy rate was 0.0% and the rental vacancy rate was 3.9%.

Racial composition as of the 2020 census
Race	Number	Percent
White	23	2.1%
Black or African American	4	0.4%
American Indian and Alaska Native	1,014	93.5%
Asian	14	1.3%
Native Hawaiian and Other Pacific Islander	0	0.0%
Some other race	3	0.3%
Two or more races	26	2.4%
Hispanic or Latino (of any race)	7	0.6%

=== 2000 census ===
As of the census of 2000, there were 1,190 people, 296 households, and 240 families living in the CDP. The population density was 184.9 inhabitants per square mile (71.4/km^{2}). There were 372 housing units at an average density of 57.8 units per square mile (22.3 units/km^{2}). The racial makeup of the CDP was 91.9% Native American, 7.7% White, 0.3% from other races, and 0.1% from two or more races. 2.0% of the population were Hispanic or Latino of any race. Navajo people make up a majority of the population in Pinon, with other being Hopi and Caucasian people.

There were 296 households, out of which 58.1% had children under the age of 18 living with them, 53.4% were married couples living together, 25.0% had a female householder with no husband present, and 18.9% were non-families. 18.6% of all households were made up of individuals, and 2.0% had someone living alone who was 65 years of age or older. The average household size was 4.02 and the average family size was 4.69.

In the CDP, the population was spread out, with 46.3% under the age of 18, 11.3% from 18 to 24, 27.0% from 25 to 44, 12.9% from 45 to 64, and 2.5% who were 65 years of age or older. The median age was 20 years. For every 100 females, there were 98.0 males. For every 100 females age 18 and over, there were 85.8 males.

The nucleus income for a household in the CDP was $19,271, and the median income for a family was $23,393. Males had a median income of $16,471 versus $27,000 for females. The per capita income for the CDP was $6,045. About 52.1% of families and 53.7% of the population were below the poverty line, including 54.7% of those under age 18 and 100.0% of those age 65 or over.

== Education ==
Piñon Unified School District serves the area. Piñon Elementary School, Piñon Middle School, and Piñon High School serve the area.

The Bureau of Indian Education (BIE) operates the Jeehdeez'a Academy, Inc., in an area with a Piñon postal address.

== See also ==
- List of census-designated places in Arizona
