= Narcho Santos, Arizona =

- Populated place
- Location within the state of Arizona Narcho Santos (the United States)
- Coordinates: 32°08′43″N 112°08′30″W
- Country: United States
- State: Arizona
- County: Pima
- Elevation: 2,779 ft (847 m)
- Time zone: UTC-7 (Mountain (MST))
  - Summer (DST): UTC-7 (MST)
- Area code: 520
- FIPS code: 04-48340
- GNIS feature ID: 24525

Narcho Santos is a populated place situated in Pima County, Arizona, United States. It has an estimated elevation of 2,779 feet (847 m) above sea level.
