= Tees Toh, Arizona =

CDP in Navajo County, Arizona

- CDP
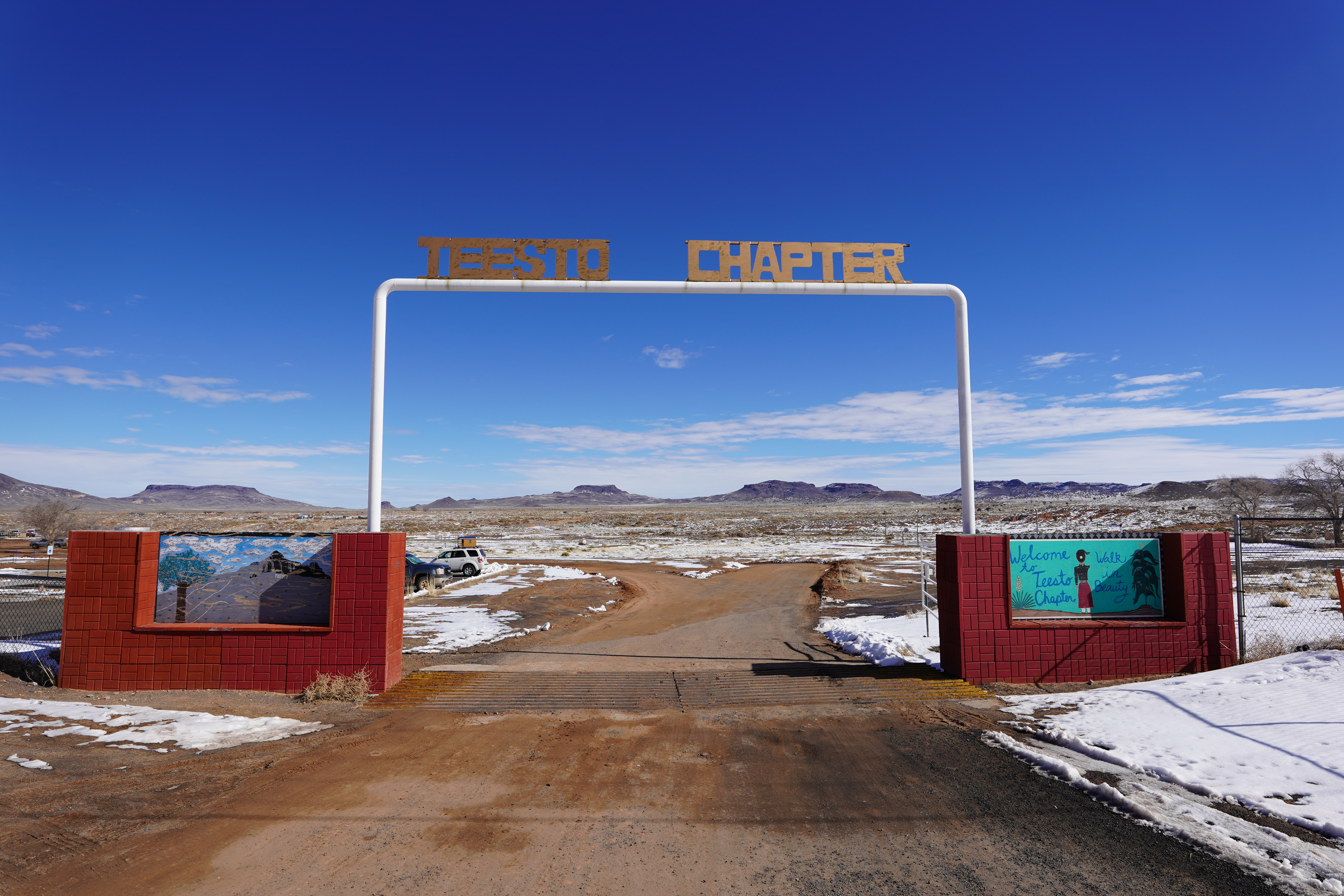
- Teesto Chapter House grounds entrance

- Location of Tees Toh in Navajo County, Arizona.

- Location in the United States
- Coordinates: 35°29′10″N 110°23′52″W
- Country: United States
- State: Arizona
- County: Navajo

Area
  - Total: 17.00 sq mi (44.04 km^{2})
  - Land: 17.00 sq mi (44.04 km^{2})
  - Water: 0 sq mi (0.00 km^{2})
- Elevation: 5,916 ft (1,803 m)

Population (2020)
  - Total: 420
  - Density: 24.7/sq mi (9.54/km^{2})
- Time zone: UTC-7 (MST)
  - Summer (DST): UTC-6 (MDT)
- FIPS code: 04-72630
- GNIS feature ID: 2582875

Tees Toh is a census-designated place in Navajo County, in the U.S. state of Arizona. The population was 448 at the 2010 census.

== Demographics ==
Historical population
Census	Pop.	Note	%±
2010	448		—
2020	420		−6.2%
U.S. Decennial Census

As of the census of 2010, there were 448 people, 118 households, and 90 families living in the CDP.

== Education ==
The community is not in any school district.
