= Nahata Dziil, Arizona =

- Chapter
- Location within the state of Arizona Nahata Dziil (the United States)
- Coordinates: 35°04′36″N 109°19′40″W
- Country: United States
- State: Arizona
- County: Apache

Area
  - Total: 550 sq mi (1,400 km^{2})
- Elevation: 6,030 ft (1,840 m)

Population (2010)
  - Total: 1,731
  - Density: 3.1/sq mi (1.2/km^{2})
- Time zone: UTC-7 (Mountain (MST))
  - Summer (DST): UTC-7 (MST)
- Area code: 928
- FIPS code: 04-TS502
- GNIS feature ID: 2419027

Nahata Dziil, sometimes written Nahatadzill, is a Chapter situated in Apache County, Arizona, United States. It is headquartered outside of Sanders, Arizona and oversees an area of 352,000 acres (550 sq. mi). It is one of the Chapters which make up the Fort Defiance Agency, one of five agencies which comprise the Navajo Nation. As of the 2010 census, the Chapter had a total population of 1,731, of whom 1,572 were Navajo. In 1991, it became the 110th and final Chapter of the Navajo Nation.
