= Monument Valley High School (Arizona) =

School in Kayenta, Arizona

Coordinates: 36.726445°N 110.245664°W

Location
- North Highway 163/Mustang Blvd; Kayenta, Arizona 86033; United States

Information
- School type: Public high school
- Motto: Excellence. Every Student, Every Day
- Established: 1958 (68 years ago)
- School district: Kayenta Unified School District
- CEEB code: 030178
- Principal: Ryan Dodson
- Grades: 9–12
- Enrollment: 668 (2023–2024)
- Colors: Scarlet, white and silver
- Mascot: Mustangs
- Website: www.kayenta.k12.az.us/o/mvhs

Monument Valley High School is a high school in Kayenta, Arizona. It is the only high school under the jurisdiction of the Kayenta Unified School District.

Built in the mid-1950s, Monument Valley High School graduated its first class in 1962. The original school building was circular, intended to resemble a traditional hogan. The center was a wood-floored basketball court, with classrooms and other facilities ringing the court. The building had considerable architectural flair.

It burned down near the end of the 1978 school year. The current school building was constructed in its place later the same year.

The school’s basketball and volleyball teams originally played in the 984-seat Beets Gymnasium until the construction in 1991 of the $11 million, 3800-seat Nash Center, named after Lucinda and Robert Nash, who were both coaches at the school. Considered legends on the Navajo Reservation and in the town of Kayenta, Lucinda Nash coached the Lady Mustangs Volleyball team, winning 37 state championships, while Robert Nash coached Monument Valley’s girls basketball team and won four state championships. The arena, which opened in 1991, was known as the Student Activity Center (1991–2015) and was the largest arena on the Navajo Nation until 2006.

Monument Valley is known for its state titles in the AIA 3A Division.

== Service area ==
In addition to Kayenta, the school district includes Chilchinbito, Oljato-Monument Valley, and Shonto.
