= Noipa Kam, Arizona =

- Populated place
- Location within the state of Arizona Noipa Kam (the United States)
- Coordinates: 32°17′06″N 112°08′55″W
- Country: United States
- State: Arizona
- County: Pima
- Elevation: 2,110 ft (643 m)
- Time zone: UTC-7 (Mountain (MST))
  - Summer (DST): UTC-7 (MST)
- Area code: 520
- FIPS code: 04-49675
- GNIS feature ID: 32340

Noipa Kam is a populated place situated on the Tohono O'odham Indian Reservation in Pima County, Arizona, United States. It has an estimated elevation of 2,110 feet (640 m) above sea level. Its name is derived from the O'odham place name, nowipakam.
