= Newfield, Arizona =

- Ghost town
- Location within the state of Arizona Newfield (the United States)
- Coordinates: 31°32′51″N 111°44′00″W
- Country: United States
- State: Arizona
- County: Pima
- Elevation: 2,677 ft (816 m)

Population (2020)
  - Total: 0
- Time zone: UTC-7 (Mountain (MST))
  - Summer (DST): UTC-7 (MST)
- Area code: 520
- FIPS code: 04-49185
- GNIS feature ID: 24534

Newfield is a ghost town and former populated place situated in Pima County, Arizona, along the border between the United States and Mexico. It has an estimated elevation of 2,677 feet (816 m) above sea level.
