= Shonto, Arizona =

CDP in Navajo County, Arizona

Shonto, Arizona Shą́ą́ʼtóhí (Navajo)
- CDP
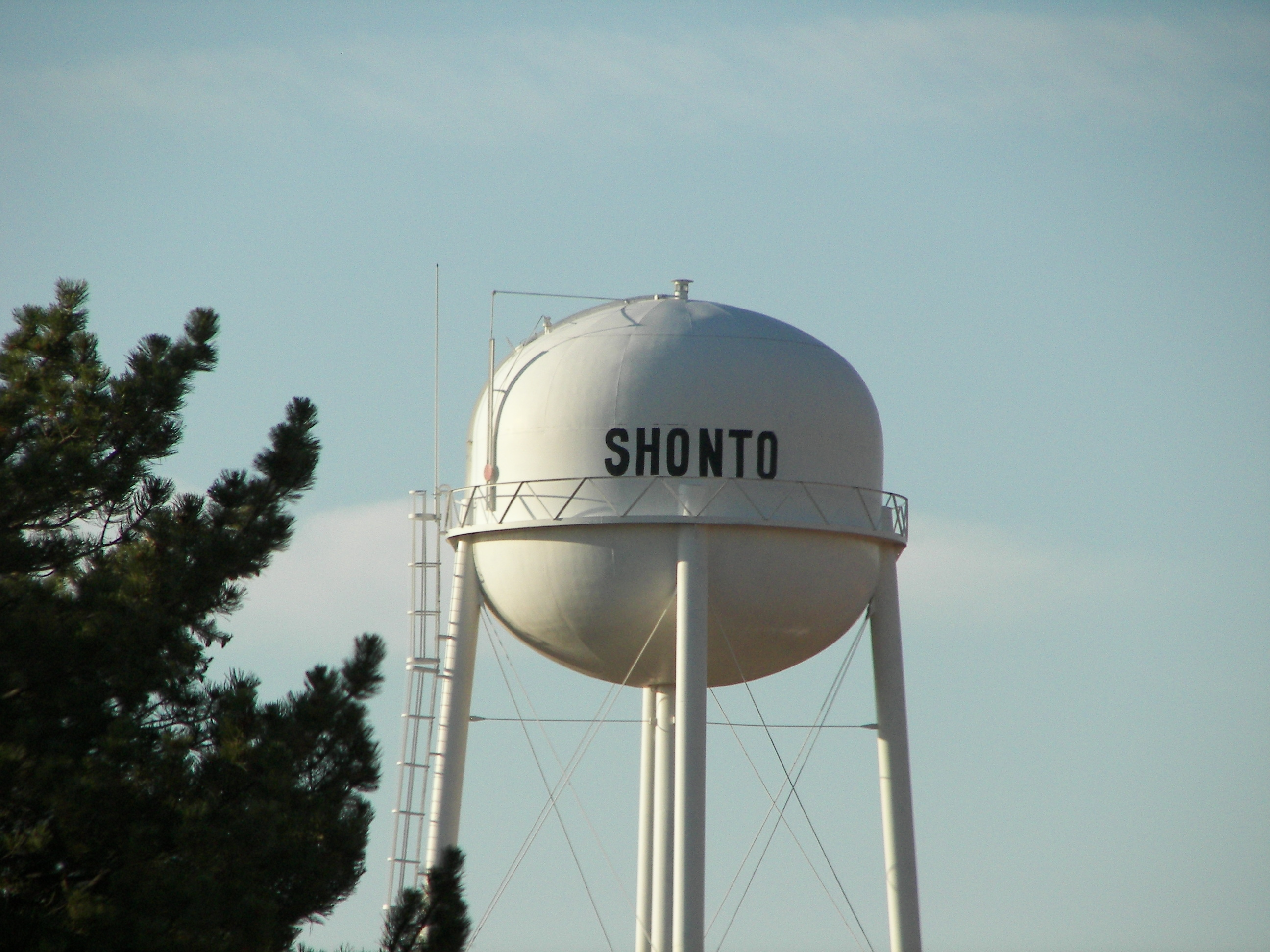
- Shonto water tower, June 2006

- Location in Navajo County and the state of Arizona

- Location in the United States
- Coordinates: 36°35′21″N 110°39′39″W
- Country: United States
- State: Arizona
- County: Navajo

Area
  - Total: 4.57 sq mi (11.83 km^{2})
  - Land: 4.56 sq mi (11.81 km^{2})
  - Water: 0.012 sq mi (0.03 km^{2})
- Elevation: 6,460 ft (1,970 m)

Population (2020)
  - Total: 494
  - Density: 108.4/sq mi (41.85/km^{2})
- Time zone: UTC-7 (MST)
- ZIP code: 86054
- Area code: 928
- FIPS code: 04-66260
- GNIS feature ID: 2408731
- Website: www.shonto.org

Shonto (Navajo: Shą́ą́ʼtóhí) is a census-designated place (CDP) in Navajo County, Arizona, United States, on the Navajo Nation. The population was 591 at the 2010 census.

== Geography ==
According to the United States Census Bureau, the CDP has a total area of 4.6 square miles (12 km^{2}), all land. In Shonto, the local Shonto Canyon is where the natural spring is located. It is connected to the canyons that stretch all the way to Navajo Mountain, which can be seen from Shonto.

== Demographics ==
Historical population
Census	Pop.	Note	%±
2000	568		—
2010	591		4.0%
2020	494		−16.4%
U.S. Decennial Census

At the 2000 census there were 568 people, 149 households, and 118 families living in the CDP. The population density was 124.3 inhabitants per square mile (48.0/km^{2}). There were 220 housing units at an average density of 48.2 per square mile (18.6/km^{2}). The racial makeup of the CDP was 1.9% White, 0.2% Black or African American, 96.3% Native American, and 1.6% from two or more races. 1.1% of the population were Hispanic or Latino of any race. Of the 149 households 52.3% had children under the age of 18 living with them, 53.7% were married couples living together, 19.5% had a female householder with no husband present, and 20.8% were non-families. 18.1% of households were one person and 4.0% were one person aged 65 or older. The average household size was 3.81 and the average family size was 4.40.

The age distribution was 43.3% under the age of 18, 9.2% from 18 to 24, 24.6% from 25 to 44, 19.0% from 45 to 64, and 3.9% 65 or older. The median age was 22 years. For every 100 females, there were 91.2 males. For every 100 females age 18 and over, there were 86.1 males.

The median household income was $42,500 and the median family income was $46,094. Males had a median income of $34,063 versus $26,875 for females. The per capita income for the CDP was $12,411. About 16.5% of families and 14.0% of the population were below the poverty line, including 22.3% of those under age 18 and 100.0% of those age 65 or over.

== Education ==
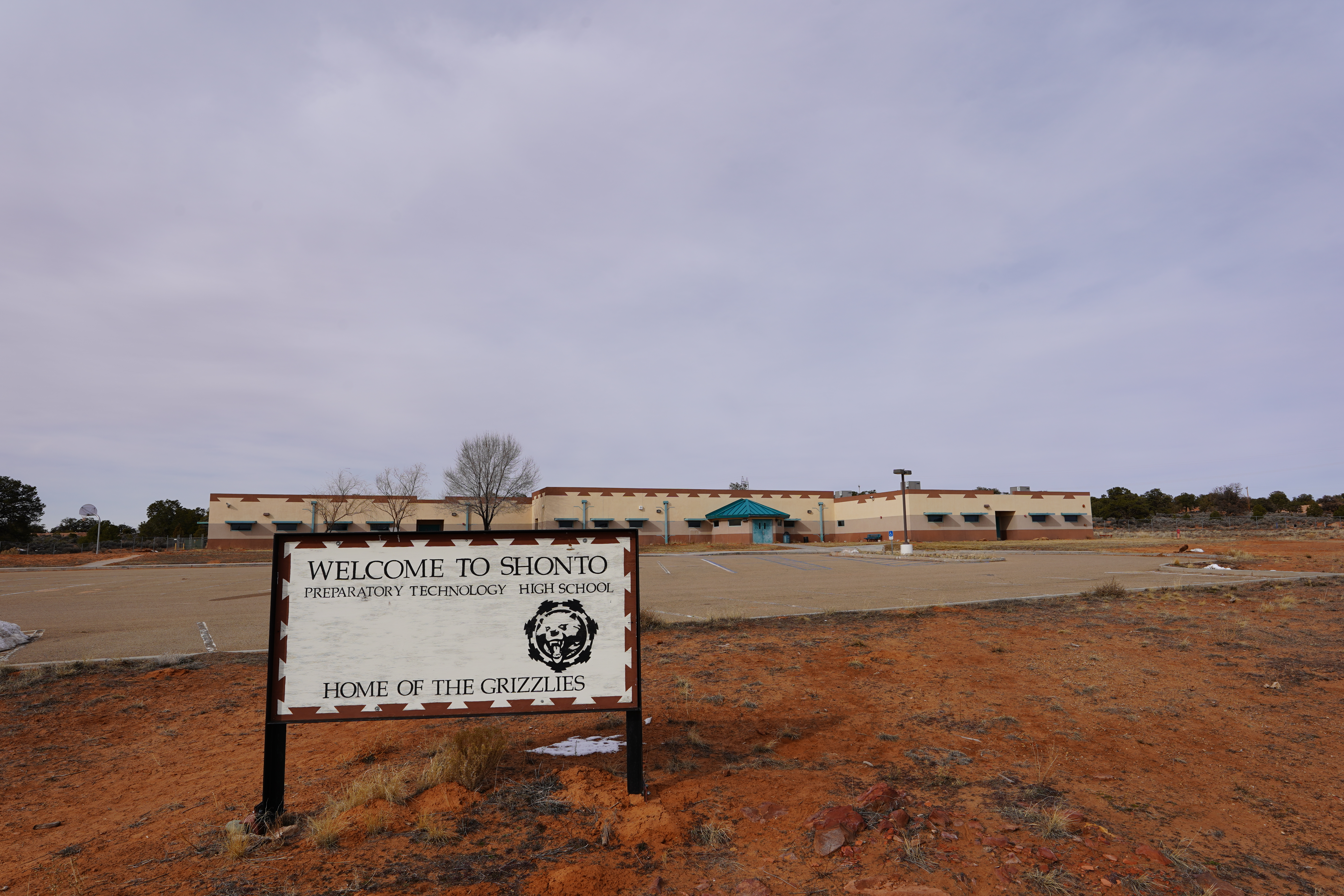
Shonto Preparatory Technology High School

The following tribal schools, affiliated with the Bureau of Indian Education (BIE), are available: Shonto Preparatory School is a K–8 school that serves the community. Shonto Preparatory Technology High School educates grades 9–12.

From the Kayenta Unified School District, in which Shonto is within, there are school district-operated public schools located in Kayenta: Kayenta Primary School, Kayenta Intermediate School, Kayenta Middle School, and Monument Valley High School also serve the community.

== Events ==
Rock the Canyon: Art & Music Festival is an annual event in the community of Shonto since its initial launch in 2009.

== Transportation ==
Express operates bus service between Shonto and Page.

== See also ==
- List of census-designated places in Arizona
