= Nelson, Yavapai County, Arizona =

Nelson, Arizona
- Populated place
- Location within the state of Arizona Nelson (the United States)
- Coordinates: 35°30′51″N 113°19′13″W
- Country: United States
- State: Arizona
- County: Yavapai
- Elevation: 5,118 ft (1,560 m)
- Time zone: UTC-7 (Mountain (MST))
  - Summer (DST): UTC-7 (MST)
- Area code: 928
- FIPS code: 04-49150
- GNIS feature ID: 8571

Nelson is a populated place situated in Yavapai County, Arizona, United States. It is one of two locations in the state with this name, the other being the census-designated place, Nelson in Pima County.
