= Chapter (Navajo Nation) =

Political unit of the Navajo Nation

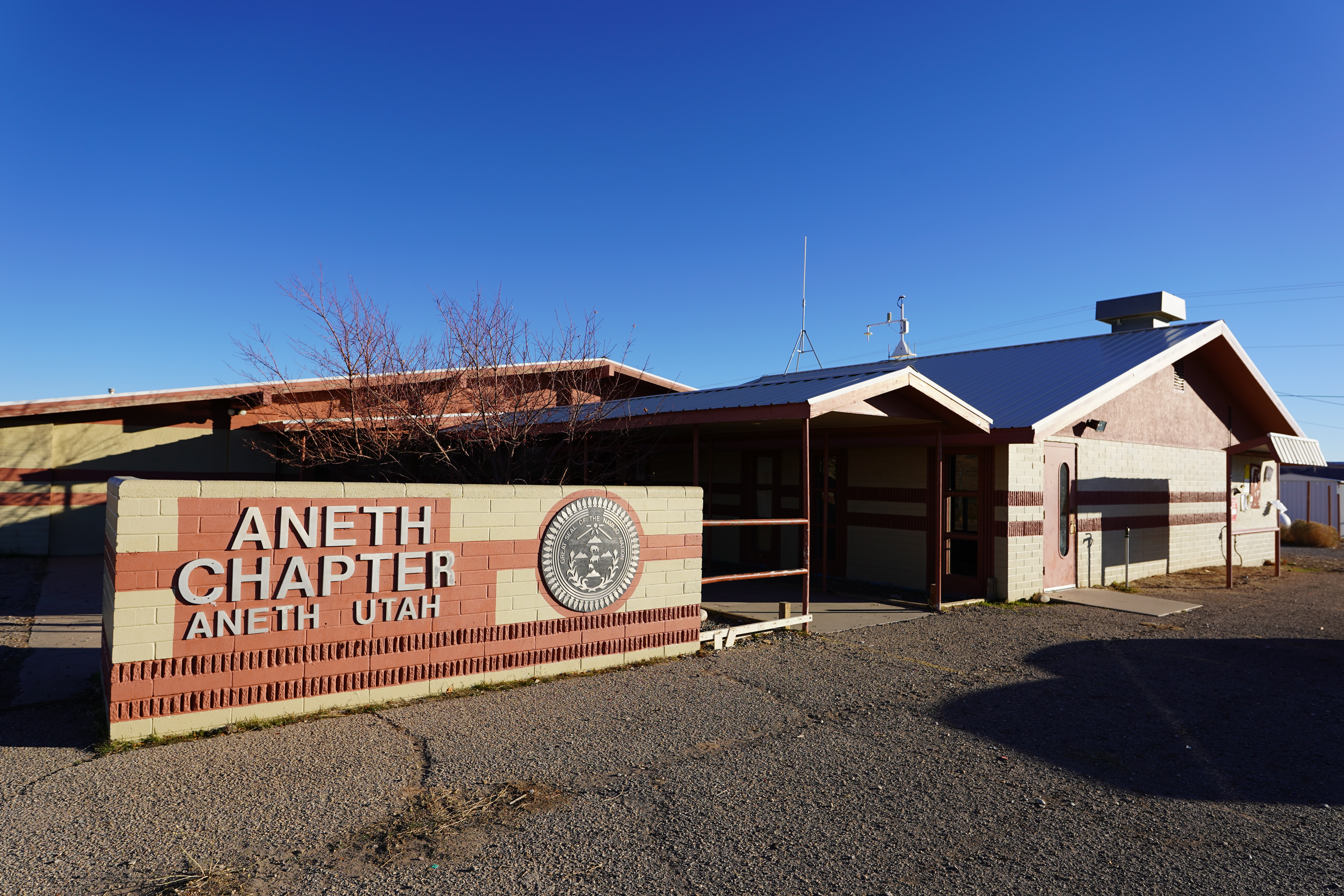
Aneth Chapter House

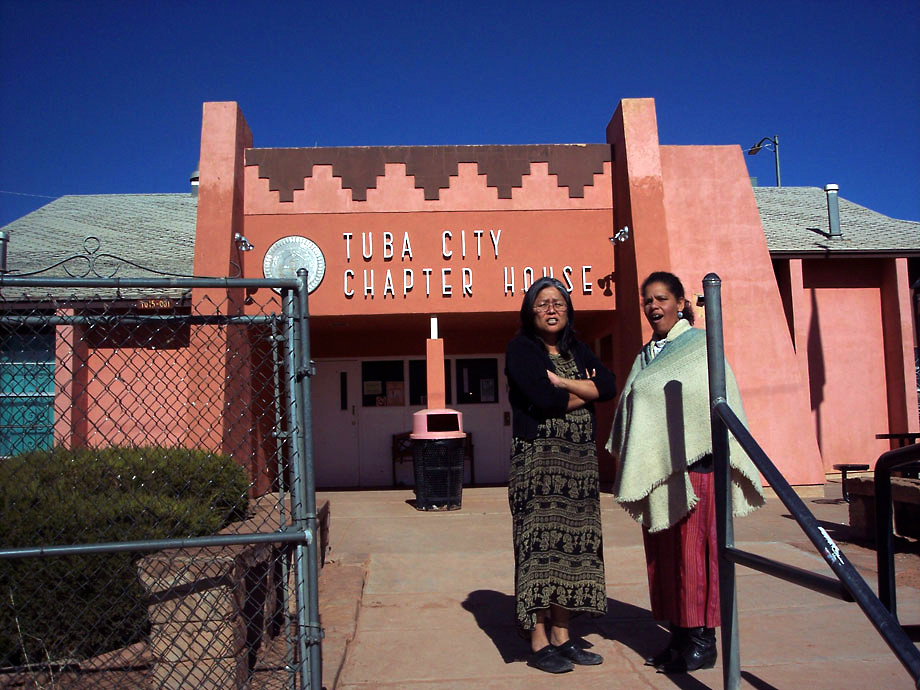
Tuba City Chapter House

A chapter is the most local form of government on the Navajo Nation. The Nation is broken into five agencies. Each agency contains chapters; currently there are 110 local chapters, each with their own chapter house. Chapters are semi-autonomous, being able to decide most matters which concern their own chapter. Typically, they meet in a Chapter house (Navajo: Áłah nidaʼadleeh dah bighan), where they can also express their opinions to their Navajo Nation Council Delegate, although those opinions are non-binding. As of January 2004, there were a total of 110 such meeting places in existence. Currently there are 24 delegates who represent the 110 chapters. The number of delegates was reduced from 88 in the 2010 election.

== History ==
John G. Hunter, superintendent of the Leupp Agency, is generally given credit for the establishment of the Chapter system starting in 1922 in an effort to bolster Navajo self-determination and local governance.

By 1933, more than 100 chapters operated across the territory. The chapters served as liaisons between the Navajo and the federal government, and also acted as precincts for the elections of tribal council delegates. But the chapters had no official authority within the structure of the Navajo Nation government.

In 1998 the Navajo Tribal Council passed the "Local Governance Act," expanding the role of the existing 110 chapters. The Act authorized Chapters to make decisions over local matters, as long as they were consistent with existing Navajo law, including customs and traditions.

== Structure ==
Each agency of the Navajo Nation is further broken down into chapters. The Central Agency contains 14 chapters; the Western Agency contains 18 chapters; the Fort Defiance Agency contains 27 chapters; the Northern Agency contains 20 chapters; and 31 chapters in the Eastern Agency.

== See also ==
- List of Navajo Nation Chapters
