= Rock Springs, New Mexico =

Rock Springs, New Mexico Tséchʼízhí (Navajo) Rock Springs Chapter
- Census-designated place
- Location in McKinley County and the state of New Mexico

- Location in the United States
- Coordinates: 35°37′30″N 108°50′02″W
- Country: United States
- State: New Mexico
- County: McKinley

Government
  - Type: Chapter (Navajo Nation)

Area
  - Total: 12.59 sq mi (32.60 km^{2})
  - Land: 12.59 sq mi (32.60 km^{2})
  - Water: 0 sq mi (0.00 km^{2})
- Elevation: 6,736 ft (2,053 m)

Population (2020)
  - Total: 807
  - Density: 64.11/sq mi (24.75/km^{2})
- Time zone: UTC-7 (Mountain (MST))
  - Summer (DST): UTC-6 (MDT)
- ZIP Code: 87375 (Yatahey)
- Area code: 505
- FIPS code: 35-64230
- GNIS feature ID: 2409194
- Website: rocksprings.navajochapters.org

Rock Springs (Navajo: Tséchʼízhí) is an unincorporated community and census-designated place (CDP) in McKinley County, New Mexico, United States. The population was 807 at the 2020 census. The community is the center of the Rock Springs Chapter of the Navajo Nation.

== History ==
The Rock Springs Chapter started to take form in the late 1930s. It is part of the "Checker Board Area" in the Eastern Agency of the Navajo Nation. The chapter area covers the communities of Sagebrush, China Springs, and Rock Springs. The community of Yatahey Junction (including Navajo Estates) is within the chapter boundaries, although is not governed by the chapter. The chapter is within commuting distance of Gallup and is influenced by this city in terms of modernization.

== Geography ==
Rock Springs is in western McKinley County, 9 miles (14 km) by road northwest of Gallup, the county seat. It is bordered to the east by the Yah-ta-hey CDP. New Mexico State Road 264 crosses the northern part of Rock Springs, leading east to U.S. Route 491 at Yah-ta-hey and west 14 miles (23 km) to Window Rock, Arizona, capital of the Navajo Nation.

According to the U.S. Census Bureau, the Rock Springs CDP has a total area of 12.6 square miles (33 km^{2}), all land. The area is drained by Burned Death Wash, which runs south to Defiance Draw, a tributary of the Puerco River and part of the Little Colorado River watershed.

== Demographics ==
Historical population
Census	Pop.	Note	%±
2000	558		—
2010	567		1.6%
2020	807		42.3%
U.S. Decennial Census

As of the census of 2000, there were 558 people, 132 households, and 114 families residing in the CDP. The population density was 92.4 inhabitants per square mile (35.7/km^{2}). There were 189 housing units at an average density of 31.3 per square mile (12.1/km^{2}). The racial makeup of the CDP was 99.64% Native American, 0.18% White, 0.18% from other races. Hispanic or Latino of any race were 1.61% of the population.

There were 132 households, out of which 68.9% had children under the age of 18 living with them, 50.0% were married couples living together, 28.0% had a female householder with no husband present, and 13.6% were non-families. 11.4% of all households were made up of individuals, and 4.5% had someone living alone who was 65 years of age or older. The average household size was 4.23 and the average family size was 4.51.

In the CDP, the population was spread out, with 47.0% under the age of 18, 10.0% from 18 to 24, 29.2% from 25 to 44, 11.1% from 45 to 64, and 2.7% who were 65 years of age or older. The median age was 20 years. For every 100 females, there were 95.1 males. For every 100 females age 18 and over, there were 85.0 males.

The median income for a household in the CDP was $26,429, and the median income for a family was $24,271. Males had a median income of $24,250 versus $22,500 for females. The per capita income for the CDP was $6,499. About 39.0% of families and 44.3% of the population were below the poverty line, including 51.0% of those under age 18 and none of those age 65 or over.

== Education ==
It is in Gallup-McKinley County Public Schools.
