= Louise Goodman (artist) =

Artist

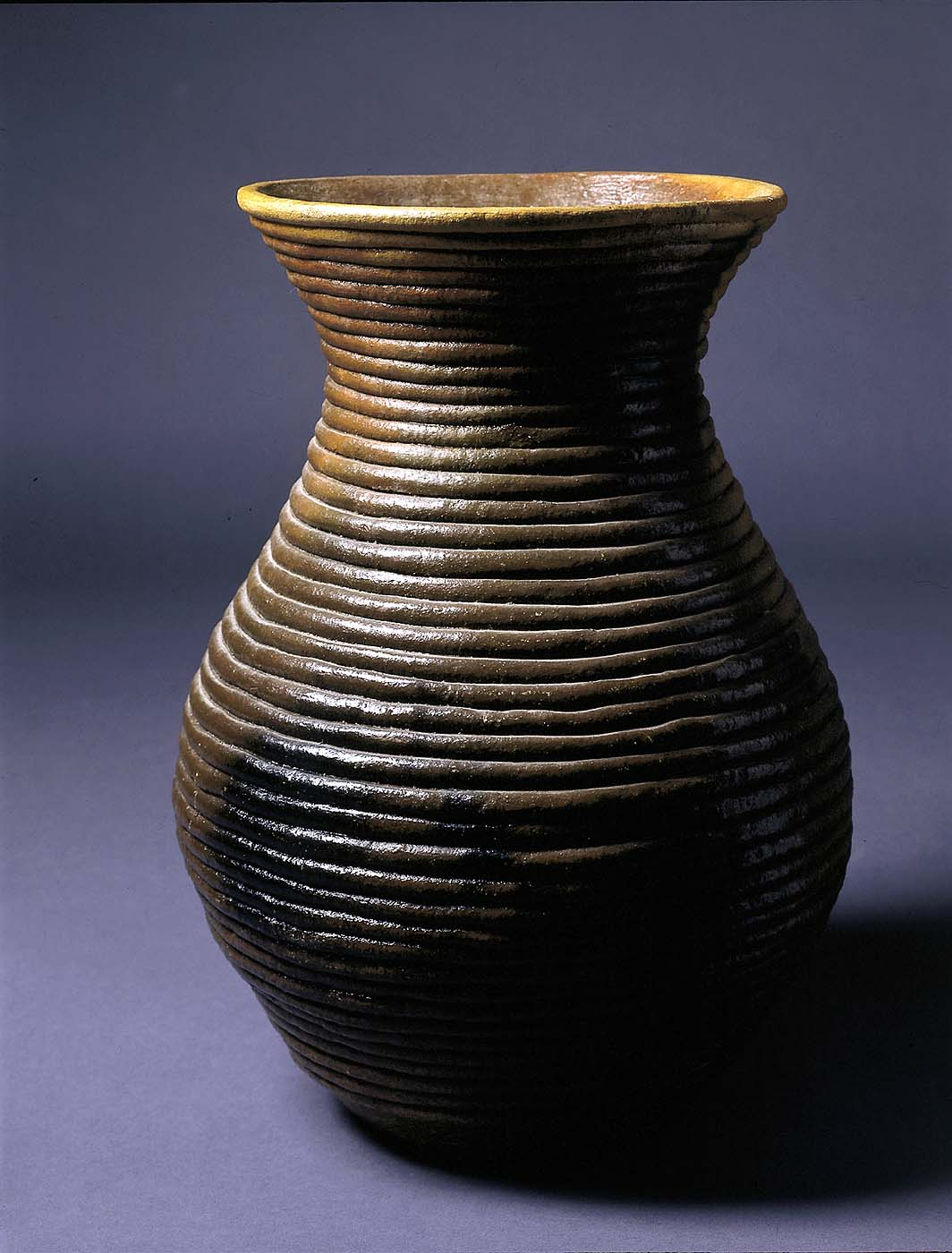
- Coiled pot in fired clay with piñon pitch, ca. 1986, by Louise Goodman Smithsonian American Art Museum
- Born: December 25, 1937 (age 88); Cow Springs, Navajo Nation, Arizona
- Known for: Ceramics
- Spouse: Eddie Goodman sr.

Louise Rose Goodman (born December 25, 1937) is a Navajo folk artist and ceramicist.

== Biography ==
A member of the Biih Bitoodnii (Deer Spring) clan, Goodman learned pottery making from her sister-in-law, Lorena Bartlett. Her range of work includes standard jars and bowls produced in a wide variety of shapes including a significant amount of animal forms such as chickens, rams, dogs, squirrels, bears, lions, elephants, and other domestic and wild creatures. Goodman turned to creating animal figures, already common among contemporary Navajo potters, when she noticed a decline in demand for her more functional clay pots. One of the most innovative styles of pottery Goodman developed is a modified coil pot, in which the coils are obliterated only on the interior surface.

Goodman's work has been exhibited at the Museum of Northern Arizona in Flagstaff, Arizona, the Heard Museum in Phoenix, the Wheelwright Museum of the American Indian in Santa Fe, New Mexico, the Navajo Nation Museum in Window Rock, Arizona, and the Smithsonian American Art Museum in Washington, D.C.

== Selected works ==
- Bear, 1990, fired clay with piñon pitch, 22 1/4 x 10 5/8 x 10 7/8 in, Smithsonian American Art Museum.
- Coiled Pot, about 1986, fired clay with piñon pitch, 14 7/8 x 11 1/8 in. (37.8 x 28.3 cm) diam., Smithsonian American Art Museum.

== Selected group exhibitions ==
- 1988 – anii ánáádaalyaa'ii; Continuity and Innovation in Recent Navajo Art, Wheelwright Museum of the American Indian, Santa Fe, New Mexico
- 1989 – Navajo Junction: Where Navajo Potteries Meet, Arizona State Museum, University of Arizona, Tucson
- 1993 – Leets 'aa bi Diné Dáályé: It Is Called Navajo Pottery, Phoebe A. Hearst Museum of Anthropology, University of California, Berkeley, California
- 1994 – Contemporary Art of the Navajo Nation, traveling exhibit organized by Cedar Rapids Museum of Art; Venues: Albuquerque Museum, Albuquerque, New Mexico; the University Art Museum, State University of New York, Albany; Museum of the Southwest, Midland, Texas
