= Arizona State Route 264 =

State highway in Arizona, United States

State Route 264
- SR 264 highlighted in red

Route information
- Maintained by ADOT
- Length: 154.35 mi (248.40 km)
- Existed: July 26, 1960–present

Major junctions
- West end: US 160 in Moenkopi
- SR 87 in Second Mesa; US 191 from Burnside to Ganado
- East end: NM 264 near Window Rock

Location
- Country: United States
- State: Arizona
- Counties: Coconino, Navajo, Apache

Highway system
- Arizona State Highway System; Interstate; US; State; Scenic Proposed; Former
← SR 261	→ SR 266

State Route 264 (SR 264) is a state highway in northeastern Arizona, that runs from a junction with US 160 near Tuba City to the New Mexico state line at Window Rock, where the highway continues as New Mexico State Road 264 (NM 264).

== Route description ==
The western terminus of State Route 264 is located at its junction with US 160 in Moenkopi, adjacent to Tuba City. The highway heads towards the southeast and then south from this junction until it reaches BIA Route 6710. At this junction, SR 264 begins to heads towards the southeast. It continues on this heading until it curves towards the south southeast of Coal Mine Mesa. The highway curves back towards the east and then north as it follows the terrain of the area. The highway curves back towards the east just prior to an intersection with BIA Route 6660. It continues towards the east to a junction with BIA Route 62 where SR 264 curves towards the southeast. The highway curves towards the south just prior to passing through Hotevilla. It curves back towards the east when it reaches Old Oraibi. The highway curves back towards the south until it reaches the northern terminus of SR 87 in Second Mesa. From here, it heads east, passing through Polacca and Keams Canyon. SR 264 continues to the southeast until it curves back toward the east at an intersection with BIA Route 6. SR 264 continues east to a junction with US 191 in Burnside and the two run concurrently until they reach Ganado. US 191 heads south from this junction as SR 264 heads east. SR 264 continues east to Window Rock, where the highway reaches its eastern terminus at the New Mexico state line. The road continues east as NM 264 toward US 491 at Yah-ta-hey.

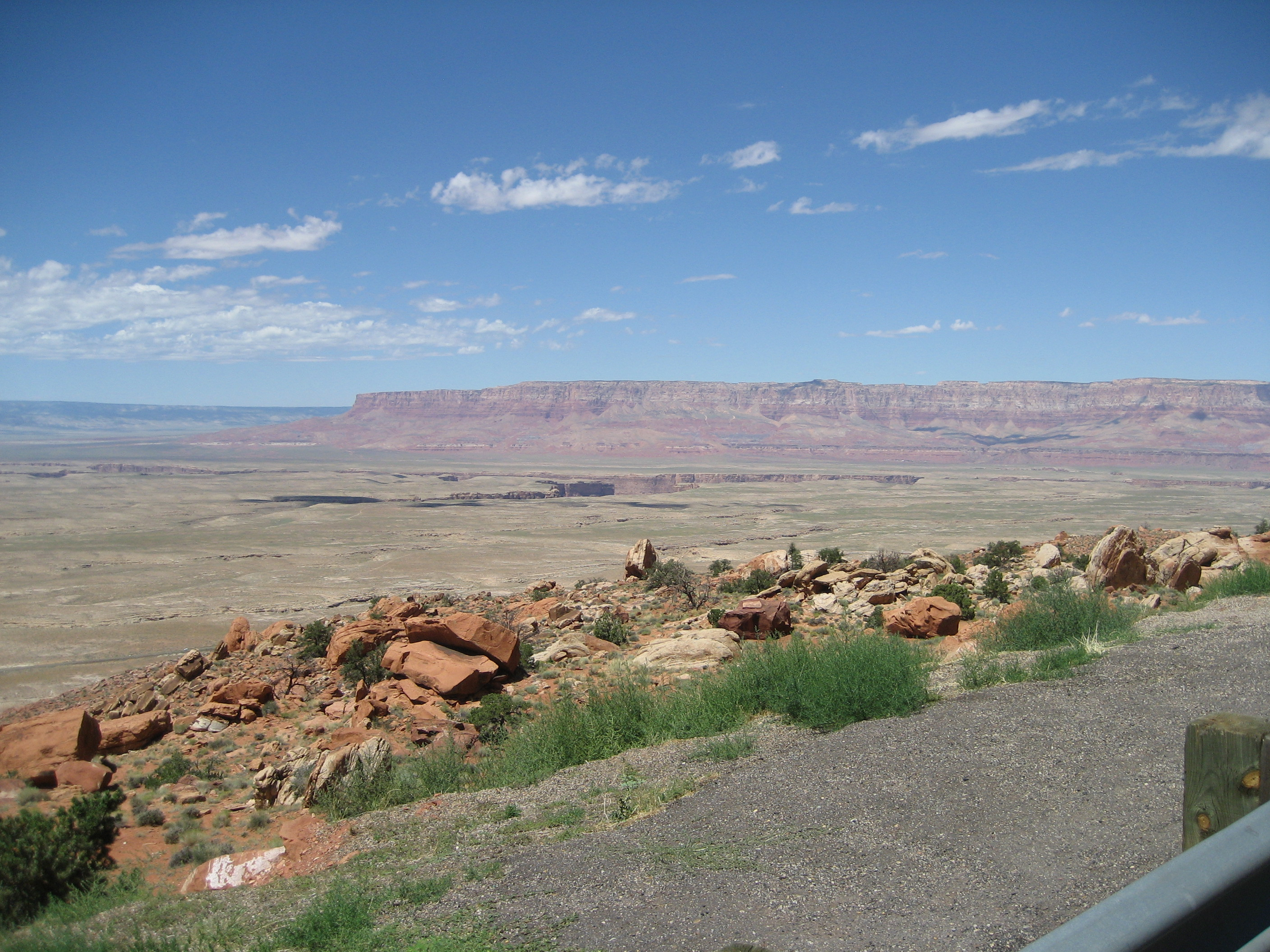
View from SR 264 a few miles from Oraibi

SR 264 is one of two major east–west routes crossing the expansive Navajo Nation, the other being US 160. Most significantly the road links together the numerous villages of the Hopi people and bisects the Hopi Reservation. In fact, navigating the Hopi Reservation would be impossible without the existence of this roadway. It connects all 12 Hopi villages and provides access to all Hopi governmental buildings. Much of this territory is sparsely inhabited and is home to wide open, scenic vistas. While it does not pass through any large cities or towns, it does pass through Window Rock, seat of government for the Navajo Nation, as well as near Old Oraibi, which is generally considered the oldest continuously inhabited settlement in North America.

Driving SR 264 between Tuba City and Steamboat involves six time zone changes in less than 100 miles (160 km) during daylight saving time.

== History ==
The route from Tuba City to Window Rock existed as a dirt road as early as 1927. By 1935, portions of the route had been improved. The section between Oraibi and Keams Canyon and the section from northwest of Ganado and the New Mexico border had been improved for travel. By 1938, the route had been improved further to a gravel road. By 1956, a large gap in the road was completed through Hah-Hoh-No-Geh Canyon, just southeast of Tuba City. In previous years, this gap had made the driving the road between Hotevilla and Tuba City impossible. About 46 miles (74 kilometres) of the Tuba City to Window Rock road was added to the state highway system as Arizona State Route 264 (SR 264) on July 26. 1960. This section began southeast of Tuba City and ended at a junction with SR 64 in Tuba City proper. By 1961, SR 264 from the SR 64 junction to a point 46 miles (74 kilometres) southeast of Tuba City had been paved. Later that year, SR 264 was extended east to the New Mexico border, ending at the beginning of New Mexico State Road 68 (NM 68). Today, NM 68 is known as NM 264, continuing the Route 264 designation east to U.S. Route 491 (US 491) in Yah-ta-hey, New Mexico.

== Junction list ==
County	Location	mi	km	Destinations	Notes
Coconino	Moenkopi	0.00	0.00	US 160 – Kayenta	Western terminus; road continues into Tuba City as Main Street
Navajo	Second Mesa	62.46	100.52	SR 87 south – Winslow	Northern terminus of SR 87
Apache	Burnside	119.26	191.93	US 191 north / BIA Route 15 west – Chinle, Dilkon	Roundabout; west end of US 191 concurrency; former SR 63 north; eastern terminus of BIA Route 15
Apache	Ganado	125.14	201.39	US 191 south – Chambers	East end of US 191 concurrency; former SR 63 south
Apache	Window Rock	154.36	248.42	NM 264 east – Gallup	Continuation into New Mexico
1.000 mi = 1.609 km; 1.000 km = 0.621 mi: Concurrency terminus
