= Black Hat, New Mexico =

- Census-designated place
- Location within New Mexico Location within the United States
- Coordinates: 35°37′51″N 108°57′51″W
- Country: United States
- State: New Mexico
- County: McKinley

Area
  - Total: 1.04 sq mi (2.70 km^{2})
  - Land: 1.04 sq mi (2.70 km^{2})
  - Water: 0 sq mi (0.00 km^{2})
- Elevation: 7,011 ft (2,137 m)

Population (2020)
  - Total: 12
  - Density: 11.5/sq mi (4.45/km^{2})
- Time zone: UTC-7 (Mountain (MST))
  - Summer (DST): UTC-6 (MDT)
- ZIP Code: 86515 (Window Rock, AZ)
- Area code: 505
- FIPS code: 35-07492
- GNIS feature ID: 2806707

Black Hat is a census-designated place (CDP) in McKinley County, New Mexico, United States. As of the 2020 census, the population was 12.

== Geography ==
The community is in the western part of McKinley County, along New Mexico State Road 264. It is 18 miles (29 km) northwest of Gallup, 5 miles (8 km) southeast of Tse Bonito, and 6 miles (10 km) southeast of Window Rock, Arizona, the seat of government of the Navajo Nation.

According to the U.S. Census Bureau, the Black Hat CDP has an area of 1.04 square miles (2.7 km^{2}), all land.

== Demographics ==
Historical population
Census	Pop.	Note	%±
2020	12		—
U.S. Decennial Census

Black Hat was first listed as a CDP prior to the 2020 census.

== Education ==
It is in Gallup-McKinley County Public Schools.
