= Stephanie Yellowhair =

Navajo transgender activist (1976–2018)

- Born: December 13, 1976; Fort Defiance, Arizona
- Died: March 30, 2018 (aged 41); Tse Bonito, New Mexico
- Notable work: "Excuse My Beauty"

Stephanie Yellowhair (December 13, 1976 – March 30, 2018) was a Navajo transgender activist who inspired the use of the slogan "Excuse My Beauty" while appearing on an episode of Cops in the early 2000s.

== Biography ==
Stephanie Yellowhair was born in 1976 to Shirley and Skeet Yellowhair Sr, in Fort Defiance, Arizona. She was a member of the Táchiiʼnii (Red Running Into the Water People Clan) and Nát’oh dine’e (Tobacco People Clan). She graduated from Window Rock High School and attended Cosmetology Academy for a degree. She was arrested on an episode of Cops for being a "public nuisance," and was arrested again in August 2011 for DUI. On March 30, 2018, Yellowhair died of chronic illness at the age of 41.

== In popular culture ==
The phrase "Excuse My Beauty," has appeared several times in RuPaul's Drag Race, Latrice Royale released a song at a Drag Convention in Los Angeles 2018, called “eXcuse the beauty.” Royale said the song was inspired and written in homage to Yellowhair, who had "just passed away." Her confrontation with the police also inspired a scene from Comedy Central's Reno 911!.
