= Tse Bonito, New Mexico =

Tse Bonito, New Mexico Tsé Binííʼtóhí (Navajo)
- Census-designated place
- Location in McKinley County and the state of New Mexico

- Location in the United States
- Coordinates: 35°38′20″N 109°00′12″W
- Country: United States
- State: New Mexico
- County: McKinley

Area
  - Total: 6.81 sq mi (17.6 km^{2})
  - Land: 6.81 sq mi (17.6 km^{2})
  - Water: 0.00 sq mi (0 km^{2})
- Elevation: 7,054 ft (2,150 m)

Population (2020)
  - Total: 380
  - Density: 56/sq mi (21.5/km^{2})
- Time zone: UTC-7 (Mountain (MST))
  - Summer (DST): UTC-6 (MDT)
- Area code: 505
- FIPS code: 35-79885
- GNIS feature ID: 2409353

Tse Bonito is a census-designated place (CDP) in McKinley County, New Mexico, United States. It is part of the greater Window Rock, Arizona, population center, and seat of the Navajo Nation government. The population was 380 at the 2020 census.

== Geography ==
Tse Bonito is in western McKinley County, with its western border along the Arizona state line. It is bordered at its southeast corner by the community of Black Hat. The northern portions of Tse Bonito lie within the Navajo Nation. Gallup, the McKinley county seat, is 23 miles (37 km) by road to the southeast.

New Mexico State Road 264 passes through the community, leading east 16 miles (26 km) to U.S. Route 491 at Yah-ta-hey. To the west, the highway leads 1 mile (1.6 km) into Window Rock, Arizona.

According to the U.S. Census Bureau, the Tse Bonito CDP has a total area of 6.8 square miles (18 km^{2}), all land. The community is drained by Tse Bonito Wash, which flows west past Window Rock to Black Creek, a south-flowing tributary of the Puerco River and part of the Little Colorado River watershed.

== Demographics ==
Historical population
Census	Pop.	Note	%±
2000	261		—
2010	299		14.6%
2020	380		27.1%
U.S. Decennial Census

As of the census of 2000, there were 261 people, 78 households, and 62 families residing in the CDP. The population density was 185.7 inhabitants per square mile (71.7/km^{2}). There were 102 housing units at an average density of 72.6 per square mile (28.0/km^{2}). The racial makeup of the CDP was 71.26% Native American, 22.61% White, 0.38% Asian, 2.68% from other races, and 3.07% from two or more races. Hispanic or Latino of any race were 4.21% of the population.

There were 78 households, out of which 42.3% had children under the age of 18 living with them, 53.8% were married couples living together, 14.1% had a female householder with no husband present, and 20.5% were non-families. 19.2% of all households were made up of individuals, and 2.6% had someone living alone who was 65 years of age or older. The average household size was 3.35 and the average family size was 3.77.

In the CDP, the population was spread out, with 37.5% under the age of 18, 9.6% from 18 to 24, 23.0% from 25 to 44, 24.5% from 45 to 64, and 5.4% who were 65 years of age or older. The median age was 28 years. For every 100 females, there were 107.1 males. For every 100 females age 18 and over, there were 98.8 males.

The median income for a household in the CDP was $38,077, and the median income for a family was $38,365. Males had a median income of $24,915 versus $24,625 for females. The per capita income for the CDP was $20,187. About 12.7% of families and 16.2% of the population were below the poverty line, including 40.0% of those under the age of eighteen and none of those 65 or over.

== Education ==
It is in Gallup-McKinley County Public Schools.

Zoned schools are: Chee Dodge Elementary School in Yah-ta-hey, Chief Manualito Middle School in Gallup, and Gallup High School in Gallup.

== Notable people ==
Christian Musician and songwriter Rich Mullins moved to Tse Bonito, NM in May of 1995 after graduating from Friends University in Wichita, KS. with a BA in Music education. Mullins intended to teach music to the children of Hilltop Christian School.
