= Oak Springs, Arizona =

CDP in Apache County, Arizona

Oak Springs, Arizona Teeł Chʼínítʼiʼ (Navajo)
- Census-designated place
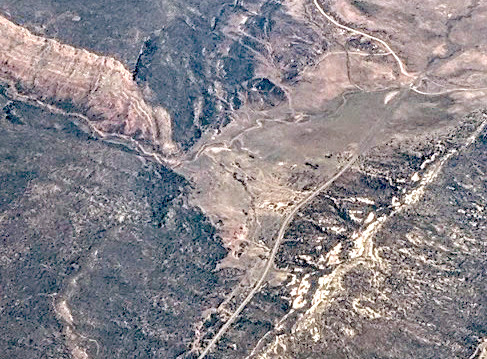
- Aerial view of Oak Springs

- Location within Arizona
- Coordinates: 35°28′34″N 109°07′55″W
- Country: United States
- State: Arizona
- County: Apache

Area
  - Total: 0.19 sq mi (0.48 km^{2})
  - Land: 0.19 sq mi (0.48 km^{2})
  - Water: 0 sq mi (0.00 km^{2})
- Elevation: 6,582 ft (2,006 m)

Population (2020)
  - Total: 54
  - Density: 293.9/sq mi (113.49/km^{2})
- Time zone: UTC-7 (MST)
  - Summer (DST): UTC-6 (MDT)
- ZIP code: 86505
- Area code: 928
- FIPS code: 04-50480
- GNIS feature ID: 2582834

Oak Springs (Navajo: Teeł Chʼínítʼiʼ) is a census-designated place (CDP) in Apache County, Arizona, United States. The population was 63 at the 2010 census.

== Geography ==
Oak Springs is located along Indian Route 12, about 10 miles (16 km) north of Interstate 40 and 13 miles (21 km) south of St. Michaels.

According to the United States Census Bureau, the CDP has a total area of 0.19 square miles (0.48 km^{2}), all land.

== Demographics ==
Historical population
Census	Pop.	Note	%±
2010	63		—
2020	54		−14.3%
U.S. Decennial Census

== Education ==
Oak Springs is within the Window Rock Unified School District. Window Rock High School is the local high school.

Two nearby Bureau of Indian Education (BIE)-operated schools take students from Oak Springs: Cove Day School and Red Rock Day School.
