= Window Rock High School =

Coordinates: 35°44′39″N 109°03′17″W

Location
- Navajo Route 12; Fort Defiance, Arizona 86504; United States

Information
- School type: Public high school
- Established: Mid-1950s
- School district: Window Rock Unified School District
- CEEB code: 030117
- Principal: William Horsley
- Teaching staff: 31.00 (FTE)
- Grades: 9–12
- Enrollment: 566 (2023–2024)
- Student to teacher ratio: 18.26
- Colors: Columbia blue, white and gray
- Mascot: Fighting Scouts
- Website: wrhs.wrschool.net

Window Rock High School is a public high school in Fort Defiance, a census-designated place in unincorporated Apache County, Arizona. WRHS is the only high school in the Window Rock Unified School District.

WRUSD, and therefore the high school, serves several unincorporated areas, including Fort Defiance, Oak Springs, St. Michaels, Window Rock, and most of Sawmill.

== History ==
The school district opened by the mid-1950s, with high school students two years later. The first students graduated in 1958 and 1959, and the school was completed in 1960.

A devastating fire burned the school to the ground early in April 1981, causing $5 million in damage. A new school was built later in the decade.

== Demographics ==
Window Rock High School had an enrollment of 728 students on October 1, 2010. 99% of the students are of Navajo ancestry. The school serves students throughout the surrounding area including Fort Defiance, St. Michaels, Sawmill, Hunters Point, Oak Springs, and several others.

== Athletics ==
The school's athletic programs are known as the "Fighting Scouts". It is a member of the Arizona Interscholastic Association's 3A Conference. The basketball program was previously led by Raul Mendoza.

== Notable alumni ==
- Ryneldi Becenti, the first Native American to play in the WNBA
- Eugene Tapahe, Navajo photographer
- Stephanie Yellowhair, Navajo transgender activist
