= Eugene Tapahe =

Navajo photographer from Arizona, U.S.

- Born: 1967 (age 58–59); Window Rock, Arizona, U.S.
- Citizenship: Navajo Nation and U.S.
- Education: Brigham Young University (BFA, MFA)
- Occupation: photographer
- Style: portrait photography, landscape photography
- Website: tapahe.com

Eugene Tapahe (/təˈpɑːhi/ tə-PAH-hee; born 1967) is a Navajo (Diné) photographer, designer, and artist based in Utah.

== Early life and education ==
Eugene Tapahe was born in 1967 in Window Rock, Arizona, on the Navajo Nation. He spent his early years living with his grandmother Susie in Fort Defiance, Arizona, in a traditional log hogan without electricity or running water. Tapahe has credited his grandmother with teaching him traditional Navajo ways, including respect for nature and the importance of the connection between people and land.

He attended Window Rock High School, where a teacher encouraged his talent in art. He attended Brigham Young University on a scholarship and graduated with a BFA in design in 1992.

== Career ==
After earning his bachelor's degree, Tapahe returned to Arizona to work at the Navajo Times as an advertising manager. Later, he transitioned to working as a photojournalist for the newspaper. Tapahe had no formal training in photography, but he drew upon his background in graphic design to learn image composition through a lens. He stayed at the newspaper for 10 years, eventually becoming the managing editor.

In 2012, Tapahe was living in Utah and working as a web developer. After returning to Arizona to visit his now elderly grandmother, he realized that working at an office job had caused him to lose touch with nature. When he returned to Utah, he told his wife that he wanted to quit his job to become a landscape photographer.

=== Art Heals: The Jingle Dress Project ===
In March 2020, in the early days of the COVID-19 pandemic, Tapahe dreamed that he was in Yellowstone National Park, surrounded by bison, when a group of women in jingle dresses joined the bison and began dancing. The jingle dress dance is a dance of healing, performed by women. It originated in the early 20th century with the Ojibwe tribe. In the dream, Tapahe felt a sense of peace and hope, and the feeling persisted after he woke up.

The dream was so vivid that he shared it with his wife and daughters and asked them to help him turn the dream into reality. Tapahe wanted four dancers to represent the Four Worlds in Navajo culture. He asked his two daughters, Erin and Dion, to participate, and they suggested two friends, sisters Sunni and JoAnni Begay, who could also join the project.

In June 2020, Tapahe and the four women traveled to the Bonneville Salt Flats where they posed for a photograph in their jingle dresses and danced. This was the beginning of Art Heals: The Jingle Dress Project.

In August 2020, they visited the Mille Lacs Band of Ojibwe, where the jingle dress dance originated. In fall 2020, they traveled to Yellowstone, the site of Tapahe's original dream. At each location, the dancers posed for photographs by Tapahe and then danced to bless the land. The group later visited Valley of the Gods, Olympic National Park, Yosemite, and Central Park. By the end of 2021, Tapahe and the dancers had also visited Alaska, Hawaii, and Canada.

Tapahe has described the goal of the project as bringing hope and healing through dance and honoring the places where the ancestors walked so that the ancestors would bring healing during COVID.

== Awards ==
- Best in Show, Cherokee Art Market, 2018
- First Place in Photography (Black & White or Continuous Tone), 2022 Santa Fe Indian Market
