= Navajo Nation Zoological and Botanical Park =

Zoo and arboretum in Window Rock, Arizona, US

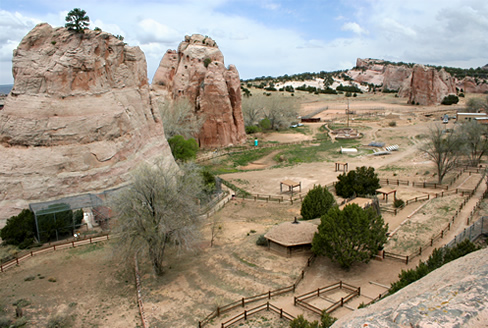
- Zoo grounds
- Interactive map of Navajo Nation Zoological and Botanical Park
- 35°39′58″N 109°02′57″W
- Date opened: June 10, 1977
- Location: Window Rock, Navajo Nation (Arizona), United States
- Land area: 14.7 acres (5.9 ha)
- No. of animals: ~100
- No. of species: 50
- Annual visitors: ~ 45,000
- Website: www.navajozoo.org

The Navajo Nation Zoological and Botanical Park (Navajo: Diné Bikéyah binaaldeehii dóó chʼil danílʼínídi) is located in Window Rock, Arizona, the capital of the Navajo Nation. It is the only tribally owned zoological park in the United States and is notable among zoological facilities in that it labels its exhibits in the Navajo language.

Having been operated by the Navajo Nation Parks and Recreation Department since its inception in the early 1960s, the park became part of the Navajo Nation Department of Fish and Wildlife in September 2006.

While its facilities have the unique mission of preserving and caring for the fauna and flora significant to Navajo culture, its existence has also sparked controversy among the more traditionalist elements in Navajo society.

== History ==
Location of the zoo on the Navajo Nation

The zoo's first specimen was a bear that had been left behind after the 1963 Navajo Nation Fair by a state organization, and the animal was named "Yogi the Bear," after the then-popular cartoon character. Since then, the exhibit has grown to about 50 different species on display, almost all of them native to the area. In 1976, the zoo, then named "Navajo Tribal Zoo," relocated to its current home and became part of the Navajo Tribal Parks and Recreation system. In September 2006, it was reorganized to be administered by the Navajo Nation Department of Fish and Wildlife.

== Staff and budget ==
The facility's current director and curator is David Mikesic, a biologist that served the Navajo Nation as an endangered species field zoologist from 1994 to 2010 under the Navajo Natural Heritage Program. His predecessor, Matthew Holdgate, was the first director (2007 to 2010) under the Department of Fish and Wildlife's leadership of the facility. He was responsible for setting the Navajo Zoo on a course of transformation and modernization.

The zoo currently employs five dedicated full-time animal care staff; this includes four zookeepers and one supervisory zookeeper. These staff also provide the construction/renovation and behavioral enrichment activities. It is primarily funded by the Navajo Nation Government with an annual budget of under US$500,000, but also solicits for donations from project sponsorship, animal adoption, and donations. Admission to the facility is free.

== Exhibits and mission ==
The zoo operates on an area spanning 14.7 acres (5.9 ha) and is located in the vicinity of the Navajo Nation Museum in Window Rock (Tségháhoodzání). It is home to about 100 animals, representing over 50 species and sees an estimated 45,000 visitors each year.

The zoo dubs itself "a Sanctuary for Nature and the Spirit", and according to its mission statement, it aims to conserve "native plants and animals, including rare, sensitive and endangered species" with an emphasis on fauna and flora that is important and significant to Navajo culture and traditions. In this spirit, it houses primarily injured and orphaned animals native to Navajoland and implements cultural and educational programs in cooperation with schools and similar facilities in the area. Furthermore, it provides care for injured and orphaned animals found in the wild. The zoo also fosters the use of plants and animals for ceremonial purposes in accordance with Navajo tradition, and regularly accepts appointments for offerings being made and ceremonies held within its facilities.

Its wild creatures include black bear, bobcat, Mexican wolves, mule deer, elk, Gila monsters, coyotes, cougars, and red foxes, as well as wild turkey, cranes, golden eagle, red-tailed hawk, and great horned owls. This zoo has exhibited the federally endangered Mexican wolf since the early 1980s. More recently, the zoo rehomed their three exhibit snakes in 2015 for cultural concerns, and became one of 20+ facilities across the U.S. to house the federally endangered black-footed ferret. In keeping with Navajo tradition, none of the zoo's birds were captured for the purpose of being exhibited, but were rather rescued after sustaining injuries from vehicles or electrical lines and are thus unable to fly; the majority of the other specimens are also non-releasable and unable to survive in the wild due to being orphaned or having been confiscated as illegal pets from their former owners.

Starting in 2008, the zoo's then 30-year-old Discovery Center was renovated and redesigned to bring it in line with modern zoo standards; apart from displaying the majority of the park's invertebrates, it also incorporates a display with traditional Navajo stories relating to the animals.

The major transformation of the Zoo continues in recent years; some of the notable improvements for exhibit animals include: incorporating behavioral enrichment practices into everyday activities, constructing permanent animal shades, enlargement of coyote and elk enclosures, incorporating wire mesh into exhibit renovations, construction of a quarantine and veterinary station, and constructing a large eagle aviary (details below). Major improvements for visitors include: more exhibit signage, a paved parking lot, concrete sidewalks, more seating around the zoo grounds, a covered stage for events, and installation of a 40-octagon pavilion for parties.

=== Animal adoption program ===
Any animal in the zoo can be "adopted" for a price; the adopting party will receive a certificate and has his or her name engraved on the plaque next to the exhibit in question. If the animal has never been adopted before, the sponsor will have the opportunity of giving the animal a name; in this process, various animals have been given names such as "Hunter" for the park's mountain lion, "Boomer" for the elk, and "Thor" for one of the golden eagles.

=== Golden Eagle Sanctuary ===
Since 2008, the zoo had lobbied for funding and a permit to build an eagle sanctuary in order to be able to distribute the animals' feathers to tribal members for ceremonial purposes in accordance with federal law. According to requirements under the federal Bald and Golden Eagle Protection Act, any remains of dead eagles are collected by the federal government and transported to a central repository in Colorado; citizens of Native American Indian nations then have to apply individually to receive parts, such as feathers, in a lengthy process with wait-times that can exceed several years. Since a tribal-operated eagle sanctuary constitutes an exception to the process, it is instrumental in strengthening Navajo cultural sovereignty. With support from the U.S. Fish and Wildlife Service, the Navajo Nation was permitted in 2012 to release naturally-molted eagle feathers to enrolled member of the Navajo Nation. These feathers came from the four Golden Eagles already on exhibit at the zoo.

Then in 2015, the Navajo Nation Zoo was successful in obtaining the necessary funding for a large Eagle Sanctuary; the bulk of the direct funding came from the Navajo Nation Council, Navajo Nation Department of Tourism, and the U.S. Fish and Wildlife Service (Tribal Wildlife Grant Program). Another nine Navajo-Tribal and NGOs, contributed in-kind services or direct funding to make this project a reality. The Navajo Nation Golden Eagle Sanctuary officially opened on July 1, 2016 with 5 non-releasable Golden Eagles. In 2018, the sanctuary houses 10 golden eagles. The facility has a footprint of 80 feet (length) by 50 feet (width) with many perching areas, and is permitted to house up to 25 Golden Eagles. This facility continues to serve as: a permanent home for non-releasable eagles, an exhibit of Golden Eagles, a location for eagle conservation education, and a legal source of molted feathers for Navajos and other Native Americans.

== Controversies ==
In January 1999, outgoing Navajo Nation president Milton Bluehouse ordered the zoo closed after two women from Rock Ridge claimed to have been visited by the Diyin Dineʼé (traditional Navajo deities), who had given them a warning, saying that the Navajo people were not living according to tradition by keeping caged animals, specifically bears, snakes, and eagles, which are considered sacred.

Subsequently, during his first days in office, Bluehouse's successor, Kelsey A. Begaye, received more complaints and letters protesting the zoo's closure than concerning any other political issue. After temporarily reversing Bluehouse's decision, Begaye then summoned a meeting with the Navajo Nation's Hataałii Advisory Council (Note: The word "Hataałii" is usually given as "medicine man" in English.) to discuss the situation; the group, however, refused to consider the matter while the animals were in hibernation and postponed any advice or decision until April of the following year. Options under consideration were releasing the animals into the wild, not accepting new animals and closing the zoo after the last one had died, or renaming the zoo to a term that would be considered more respectful to the animals.

Opponents to the shut-down maintained that most of the animals were unable to survive in the wild and would perish, and that the zoo's facilities had become one of the last possibilities for future generations of Navajos to see the sacred creatures and thereby relate to traditional stories, due to the fact that most younger Navajos are more accustomed to dealing with domesticated livestock rather than untamed animals.

On March 12, Begaye announced his decision to keep the zoo open without expanding it and letting the remaining animals live out their lives on the zoo-grounds. According to Harry Walters, an anthropologist and former chairman of the Center for Diné Studies at Diné College in Tséhílį́, the incident demonstrates a crucial difference between Navajo and Western culture in the way visions and supernatural experiences are handled: "Rather than focus on the sightings to determine if who saw it was nuts or not – that's what a Westerner would do – we look at it as a message: 'Are we going the way we should?'" Walters said.

== See also ==
- List of botanical gardens and arboretums in Arizona
- List of botanical gardens in the United States
