= Window Rock Unified School District =

School district in Arizona, United States

Window Rock Unified School District (WRUSD) is a school district within Apache County, Arizona, United States. The district comprises seven schools within a 65-mile radius.

WRUSD serves several unincorporated areas, including Fort Defiance, Oak Springs, St. Michaels, Window Rock, and most of Sawmill.

== Schools ==
- Window Rock Elementary School
- Sawmill Primary Learning Center
- Tse Ho Tso Primary Learning Center
- Tse Ho Tso Intermediate Learning Center
- Tse Ho Tso Middle School
- Tséhootsooí Diné Biʼóltaʼ
  - The Navajo Nation operates Tséhootsooí Diné Bi'Ólta', a Navajo language immersion school for grades K–8 in Fort Defiance, Arizona. Located on the Arizona-New Mexico border in the southeastern quarter of the Navajo Reservation, the school strives to revitalize Navajo among children of the Window Rock Unified School District. Tséhootsooí Diné Bi'ólta' has thirteen Navajo language teachers who instruct only in the Navajo language, and no English, while five English language teachers instruct in the English language. Kindergarten and first grade are taught completely in the Navajo language, while English is incorporated into the program during third grade, when it is used for about 10% of instruction.
- Window Rock High School
