= Hunters Point Boarding School =

Tribal school in Apache County, Arizona

Coordinates: 35°35′36″N 109°06′14″W

- Apache County, Arizona; United States

Information
- Type: Boarding School
- Website: www.hpbs-az.org

Hunters Point Boarding School, Inc. (HPBS, Navajo: Tse’Na’shchiiO’lta’) is a boarding elementary school, operated by the Navajo tribe, in unincorporated Apache County, Arizona, with a St Michaels address. It is operated in partnership with the Bureau of Indian Education (BIE). A school board manages the school, which is funded with money from the federal government.

It serves kindergarten through grade five. It includes a dormitory which houses students on weekdays; students visit their houses on weekends. In 2021 the administration of the school stated that its financial situation is tight which means the school has to be careful about how it spends its money. According to Alden Woods of the Arizona Republic, "Hunters Point Boarding School represents the challenges and opportunities facing BIE schools across the country."

== History ==
Since March 2020, in the COVID-19 pandemic in Arizona, the school operated fully virtually.

== Academic performance ==
In 2021 the BIE ranked HPBS on a list of schools that are not adequately performing.

== Campus ==
Its current buildings opened in the 1960s. Felicia Fonseca of the Associated Press described the facility as "small" and "aging".

The campus has housing for its teachers. Genevieve Jackson, the president of the HPBS school board, described the buildings as being in poor condition.

== Student body ==
Jackson stated that the students often are from low income and/or single parent households.
