= New Mexico State Road 264 =

State highway in New Mexico, United States

State Road 264
- NM 264 highlighted in red

Route information
- Maintained by NMDOT
- Length: 15.945 mi (25.661 km)

Major junctions
- West end: SR 264 at the Arizona state line at Tse Bonito
- East end: US 491 at Yah-ta-hey

Location
- Country: United States
- State: New Mexico
- Counties: McKinley

Highway system
- New Mexico State Highway System; Interstate; US; State; Scenic
← NM 263	→ NM 266

State Road 264 (NM 264) is a state highway in the U.S. state of New Mexico. The highway extends 15.945 miles (25.661 km) from the Arizona state line at Tse Bonito, where the road continues west as Arizona State Route 264 (AZ 264), east to U.S. Route 491 (US 491) at Yah-ta-hey. NM 264 connects the Navajo Nation capital of Window Rock immediately west of the state line with US 491 north of Gallup in western McKinley County.

== Route description ==
NM 264 begins at the Arizona–New Mexico state line just northwest of the unincorporated village of Tse Bonito. The highway continues west as AZ 264 into Window Rock, the capital of the Navajo Nation. NM 264 begins within the main body of the Navajo Nation but heads southeast out of the Native American reservation and passes through Tse Bonito. The highway is four lanes, either divided or with a center turn lane, for its entire length, and it passes through an area of checkerboard land ownership in which alternating sections of land have Navajo and non-Navajo ownership. NM 264 passes to the north of Rock Springs, and the route passes through the village of Yah-ta-hey immediately before it reaches its eastern terminus at a trumpet interchange with US 491. The interchange primarily serves the movement between NM 264 and US 491 south toward Gallup, although the U.S. Highway is entirely four lanes from Gallup north to Shiprock.

== Junction list ==
The entire route is in McKinley County.

Location	mi	km	Destinations	Notes
Tse Bonito	0.000	0.000	SR 264 west – Window Rock, Ganado	Western terminus; Arizona state line
Yah-ta-hey	15.945	25.661	US 491 – Gallup, Shiprock	Eastern terminus; trumpet interchange
1.000 mi = 1.609 km; 1.000 km = 0.621 mi
