= Navajo Nation Museum =

Museum in Window Rock, Arizona

- Location within Arizona
- Established: 1961
- Location: Highway 264 and Loop Road; Window Rock, Arizona 86515
- Coordinates: 35.6642°N 109.0511°W
- Type: Ethnographic, archaeological, art
- Website: navajopeople.org/nnm/

The Navajo Nation Museum is located in Window Rock, Arizona and serves as a cultural memory institute alongside the Navajo Nation Library and the Special Collections. Its collections, exhibits, and other activities focus on the cultural history of the Navajo people. Its activities include traditional museum exhibits and programs that help to focus, maintain, and preserve the Navajo language and Navajo culture.

== Facilities ==
The museum is located in a modern building in Window Rock, Arizona, the capital of the Navajo Nation, next to the Navajo Zoo. It is in the approximate center of a 27,000-square-mile (70,000 km^{2}) Navajo reservation, about 500 yards (0.46 km) west of Arizona's border with New Mexico.

The museum building – officially named the Navajo Nation Museum, Library & Visitor's Center – also houses the Navajo Nation Library, home to five special collections that support historical, legal, cultural and governmental research. The building is surrounded by the area's typical sandstone cliffs. A trailhead begins outside, leading to an overlook of the reservation.

The current building is the product of a long development process. A Navajo Tribal Museum was established in 1961 in a small building on the Window Rock Tribal Fairgrounds. In 1982, it moved to the backroom of an arts and crafts store. In 1997, the current building was constructed at a cost of $7 million.

== Collections and exhibits ==
The museum collects items that help to document the culture and history of the Navajo people, including selected materials from tribal and non-Indian neighbors. Its extensive holdings include artistic, ethnographic, archaeological, and archival materials. These include over 40,000 photographs and a wide variety of documents, recordings, motion picture film, and videos. The archives are heavily used by authors, researchers, and publishers as a source for historical photographs. Most of the collections are available for on-site study and exhibit loan.

The museum maintains an active and professional exhibits program, most of which is produced in-house. Exhibits tend to highlight the work of Navajo artists in various media, including weavings. These art-oriented exhibitions are interspersed with historical and cultural exhibits. A comprehensive, large-scale, long-term exhibition on Navajo culture and history is currently being researched and scripted.

Current exhibits include an interpretive video and photographs, artwork, jewelry, and textiles relating to the history and culture of the Navajo people. One describes the arduous 1864 ordeal known as the Long Walk of the Navajo, in which the Navajo were removed from tribal lands and marched some 300 miles to a prison camp in Fort Sumner, New Mexico.

Another one would be titled Jo' Jini'–If These Objects Could Talk. Medicine men who share traditional Navajo teachings often end each pronouncement by saying "jó jiní" ("that's what I heard" or "it was said"). The exhibit features 60 items, including jewelry, folk art, pottery, historical items and contemporary pieces, contributed by 25 different donors. One such donated piece includes a flag that was flown at Fort Sumner.

In 2018 the National Archives loaned the museum the only copy of the 1868 treaty that created the Navajo reservation and ended the incarceration of the Navajo at Fort Sumner. A second copy later surfaced at the home of Samuel F. Tappan, a member of the Indian Peace Commission who had helped to draft the treaty. That copy went to the Bosque Redondo memorial for the anniversary of the treaty's signing. A third copy is thought to have been buried with Barboncito.

The exhibits are supplemented by items in the museum's gift shop, which offers books about Navajo culture, jewelry, and other items in the museum's collections.

== Other activities ==
The museum and its former director Manuelito Wheeler (Navajo) have a great interest in reviving and preserving the Navajo language, and in making it accessible to a greater number of Navajos. They worked with LucasFilm to create a Navajo-dubbed version of Star Wars: Episode IV – A New Hope; the project was completed in 2013. In 2015 they spent a full year collaborating with Pixar on a Navajo-language version of Finding Nemo. Great care was taken in selecting Navajo voice actors and in producing linguistically accurate dubbing. The film, Nemo Hádéést'íí, premiered in Albuquerque in 2016 and played in select cities throughout the southwest. It was very well received by Navajo audiences.

Wheeler has presented academic lectures on Navajo subjects, including "Navajo Identity through Global Projects." Under his direction, the museum worked with world-renowned artist Ai Weiwei, partnering him with Navajo artist Bert Benally to create a site-specific installation piece in a remote canyon on the Navajo Nation.
