= Yah-ta-hey, New Mexico =

Yah-ta-hey, New Mexico Tʼáá Bííchʼį́įdii
- Census-designated place
- Location in McKinley County and the state of New Mexico

- Location in the United States
- Coordinates: 35°37′24″N 108°47′20″W
- Country: United States
- State: New Mexico
- County: McKinley

Area
  - Total: 3.44 sq mi (8.90 km^{2})
  - Land: 3.44 sq mi (8.90 km^{2})
  - Water: 0 sq mi (0.00 km^{2})
- Elevation: 6,667 ft (2,032 m)

Population (2020)
  - Total: 757
  - Density: 220.4/sq mi (85.09/km^{2})
- Time zone: UTC-7 (Mountain (MST))
  - Summer (DST): UTC-6 (MDT)
- ZIP code: 87375
- Area code: 505
- FIPS code: 35-85860
- GNIS feature ID: 2409634

Yah-ta-hey (Navajo: Tʼáá Bííchʼį́įdii) is a census-designated place (CDP) in McKinley County, New Mexico, United States. As of the 2020 census, the CDP population was 757, up from 590 in 2010. The English name for this place is an approximation of the Navajo greeting yáʼátʼééh, though the actual Navajo name means "just like a devil", the nickname for Anglo storekeeper J. B. Tanner. Tanner operated the trading post located here, and was criticized by the local community for his greedy business practices. The same name is used for Aneth, Utah, where Tanner also worked.

== Geography ==
Yah-ta-hey is in western McKinley County, 8 miles (13 km) north of Gallup, the county seat. The center of the community is along New Mexico State Road 264, just west of its eastern terminus at U.S. Route 491. NM 264 leads west 18 miles (29 km) to Window Rock, Arizona, while US 491 leads south to Gallup and north 86 miles (138 km) to Shiprock.

According to the U.S. Census Bureau, the CDP has a total area of 3.4 square miles (8.8 km^{2}), all land. The community is drained by Burned Death Wash and its tributaries Black Ridge Wash and White Smoke Wash. Burned Death Wash runs south to Defiance Draw, which joins the Puerco River west of Defiance.

== Demographics ==
Historical population
Census	Pop.	Note	%±
2000	580		—
2010	590		1.7%
2020	757		28.3%
U.S. Decennial Census

As of the census of 2000, there were 580 people, 156 households, and 138 families residing in the CDP. The population density was 146.3 inhabitants per square mile (56.5/km^{2}). There were 180 housing units at an average density of 45.4 per square mile (17.5/km^{2}). The racial makeup of the CDP was 69.31% Native American, 16.21% White, 0.34% Asian, 8.10% from other races, and 6.03% from two or more races. Hispanic or Latino of any race were 16.90% of the population.

There were 156 households, out of which 51.3% had children under the age of 18 living with them, 59.0% were married couples living together, 24.4% had a female householder with no husband present, and 10.9% were non-families. 9.0% of all households were made up of individuals, and 1.9% had someone living alone who was 65 years of age or older. The average household size was 3.72 and the average family size was 3.91.

In the CDP, the population was spread out, with 37.6% under the age of 18, 10.9% from 18 to 24, 23.6% from 25 to 44, 23.1% from 45 to 64, and 4.8% who were 65 years of age or older. The median age was 27 years. For every 100 females, there were 95.3 males. For every 100 females age 18 and over, there were 93.6 males.

The median income for a household in the CDP was $51,023, and the median income for a family was $53,203. Males had a median income of $25,682 versus $26,184 for females. The per capita income for the CDP was $26,307. About 21.2% of families and 15.1% of the population were below the poverty line, including 10.9% of those under age 18 and 100.0% of those age 65 or over.

== Education ==
It is in Gallup-McKinley County Public Schools.

Zoned schools are: Chee Dodge Elementary School in Yah-ta-hey, Chief Manualito Middle School in Gallup, and Gallup High School.
