= St. Michaels, Arizona =

CDP in Apache County, Arizona

St. Michaels, Arizona Tsʼíhootso (Navajo)
- Census-designated place
- Location in Apache County and the state of Arizona

- Location in the United States St. Michaels (the United States)
- Coordinates: 35°39′38″N 109°05′46″W
- Country: United States
- State: Arizona
- County: Apache

Area
  - Total: 3.82 sq mi (9.89 km^{2})
  - Land: 3.82 sq mi (9.89 km^{2})
  - Water: 0 sq mi (0.00 km^{2})
- Elevation: 6,815 ft (2,077 m)

Population (2020)
  - Total: 1,384
  - Density: 362.4/sq mi (139.92/km^{2})
- Time zone: UTC-7 (MST)
  - Summer (DST): UTC-6 (MDT)
- ZIP code: 86511
- FIPS code: 04-62420
- GNIS feature ID: 2409230

St. Michaels (Navajo: Tsʼíhootso) is a chapter of the Navajo Nation and a census-designated place (CDP) in Apache County, Arizona, United States. The Navajo Nation Government Campus is located within the chapter at Window Rock.

The population was 1,443 at the 2010 census.

== Geography ==
St. Michaels is located on the eastern boundary of the Defiance Plateau. The community is located on the western side of the Black Creek Valley and Black Creek, a north tributary to the southwest-flowing Rio Puerco.

According to the United States Census Bureau, the CDP has a total area of 3.8 square miles (9.9 km^{2}), all land.

== History ==
The St. Michaels area is referred to as Ts'ithootso in the Navajo language and translates to "area that extends out in yellow and green." The microclimate was originally referred to by its Spanish translation Ciénega Amarilla (Spanish: "yellow meadow") describing the late summer yellow flowers and grass. The area was first noted by the U.S. military in 1850 when Lt. James Harvey Simpson named it Sieneguilla de Maria, its Spanish name misheard by a non-native speaker.

In the 1850s a planned ambush against local Navajos was thwarted by a man who went on to become a signatory to the Navajo Treaty of 1868. Delgadito (Chách'oshnééz ((“Tall Syphilis”)) successfully alerted Navajos preparing for a prisoner exchange with Mexican slave-holders.

=== Saint Michael Convent ===
Construction on the Franciscan Mission began in 1896 using financing from Rev. Mother Katharine Drexel, founder of the Sisters of the Blessed Sacrament. Rev. Anselm Weber took over construction on October 11, 1897, adopting the name Saint Michaels for the area (from Navajo Tsʼíhootso: "Green Meadow"). St. Michael Parish would be officially founded in 1898.

In 1910, Fr. Berard Haile prepared a Navajo ethnologic dictionary at the Franciscan Mission.

== Demographics ==
Historical population
Census	Pop.	Note	%±
1990	1,119		—
2000	1,295		15.7%
2010	1,443		11.4%
2020	1,384		−4.1%

=== 2020 census ===
As of the 2020 census, St. Michaels had a population of 1,384. The median age was 42.1 years. 24.3% of residents were under the age of 18 and 19.1% of residents were 65 years of age or older. For every 100 females there were 102.0 males, and for every 100 females age 18 and over there were 98.9 males age 18 and over.

0.0% of residents lived in urban areas, while 100.0% lived in rural areas.

There were 421 households in St. Michaels, of which 41.6% had children under the age of 18 living in them. Of all households, 39.9% were married-couple households, 17.6% were households with a male householder and no spouse or partner present, and 35.9% were households with a female householder and no spouse or partner present. About 20.9% of all households were made up of individuals and 9.0% had someone living alone who was 65 years of age or older.

There were 437 housing units, of which 3.7% were vacant. The homeowner vacancy rate was 0.0% and the rental vacancy rate was 0.0%.

Racial composition as of the 2020 census
Race	Number	Percent
White	61	4.4%
Black or African American	0	0.0%
American Indian and Alaska Native	1,278	92.3%
Asian	1	0.1%
Native Hawaiian and Other Pacific Islander	1	0.1%
Some other race	4	0.3%
Two or more races	39	2.8%
Hispanic or Latino (of any race)	21	1.5%

=== 2000 census ===
As of the census of 2000, there were 1,295 people, 306 households, and 247 families residing in the CDP. The population density was 338.5 inhabitants per square mile (130.7/km^{2}). There were 360 housing units at an average density of 94.1 per square mile (36.3/km^{2}). The racial makeup of the CDP was 91.1% Native American, 7.0% White, 0.1% Black or African American, 0.8% from other races, and 1.0% from two or more races. 2.2% of the population were Hispanic or Latino of any race.

There were 306 households, out of which 50.3% had children under the age of 18 living with them, 49.0% were married couples living together, 25.8% had a female householder with no husband present, and 19.0% were non-families. 13.1% of all households were made up of individuals, and 3.9% had someone living alone who was 65 years of age or older. The average household size was 4.0 and the average family size was 4.5.

In the CDP, the age distribution of the population shows 40.8% under the age of 18, 10.7% from 18 to 24, 24.9% from 25 to 44, 17.1% from 45 to 64, and 6.5% who were 65 years of age or older. The median age was 24 years. For every 100 females, there were 93.9 males. For every 100 females age 18 and over, there were 87.1 males.

The median income for a household in the CDP was $34,107, and the median income for a family was $28,839. Males had a median income of $41,964 versus $24,531 for females. The per capita income for the CDP was $11,572. About 20.3% of families and 22.4% of the population were below the poverty line, including 24.3% of those under age 18 and 27.3% of those age 65 or over.

== Education ==
St. Michaels is a part of Window Rock Unified School District, and is served by Window Rock Elementary School, Tse Ho Tso Middle School, and Window Rock High School.

The community is also served by the Saint Michael Indian School, a K–12 private, Catholic school established by Saint Katharine Drexel in 1902. Saint Michael Indian School is a member of the National Catholic Education Association and the Roman Catholic Diocese of Gallup Catholic School System.

A tribal elementary school that contracts with the Bureau of Indian Education (BIE), Hunters Point Boarding School, is nearby and has a St. Michaels postal address.

== Health care ==
St. Michaels is served by the Fort Defiance Indian Hospital at Fort Defiance.

== Notable people ==
- Brenda Jesus, member of Navajo Nation Council
