= U.S. Route 491 =

U.S. Highway in New Mexico, Colorado, and Utah in the United States

U.S. Route 491
- Map of the Four Corners area with US 491 highlighted in red

Route information
- Auxiliary route of US 91
- Maintained by NMDOT, CDOT, UDOT
- Length: 193.930 mi (312.100 km)
- History: 1926–2003 as US 666; 2003–present as US 491
- Tourist routes: Trails of the Ancients Byway

Major junctions
- South end: I-40 / NM 602 in Gallup, New Mexico
- US 64 in Shiprock, New Mexico; US 160 in Cortez, Colorado
- North end: US 191 in Monticello, Utah

Location
- Country: United States
- States: New Mexico, Colorado, Utah
- Counties: New Mexico: McKinley, San Juan; Colorado: Montezuma, Dolores; Utah: San Juan

Highway system
- United States Numbered Highway System; List; Special; Divided
← SR-320	Utah	→ US 6
← E-470	Colorado	→ US 550
← NM 485	New Mexico	→ NM 494

U.S. Route 491 (US 491) is a north–south U.S. Highway serving the Four Corners region of the United States. It was created in 2003 as a renumbering of U.S. Route 666 (US 666). With the US 666 designation, the road was nicknamed the "Devil's Highway" because of the significance of the number 666 to many Christian denominations as the Number of the Beast. This Satanic connotation, combined with a high fatality rate along the New Mexico portion, convinced some people the highway was cursed. The problem was compounded by persistent sign theft. These factors led to two efforts to renumber the highway, first by officials in Arizona, then by those in New Mexico. There have been safety improvement projects since the renumbering, and fatality rates have subsequently decreased.

The highway, now a spur route of US 91 via its connection to US 191, runs through New Mexico, Colorado and Utah, as well as the tribal nations of the Navajo Nation and Ute Mountain Ute Tribe. The highway passes by two mountains considered sacred by Native Americans: Ute Mountain and an extinct volcanic core named Shiprock. Other features along the route include Mesa Verde National Park and Dove Creek, Colorado, the self-proclaimed pinto-bean capital of the world.

== Route description ==
US 491 serves the states of New Mexico, Colorado and Utah. Before 1992, US 666 also served Arizona. The Arizona portion was renumbered separately and is now part of US 191. The former US 666 was the only highway to have passed through each of the Four Corners states, even though it never came near the Four Corners Monument, which is accessed via US 160. At several points along US 491, mountain ranges in all of the Four Corners states are visible from a single location. The alignment of the highway is mostly north–south, however the Utah portion was signed east–west.

=== New Mexico ===
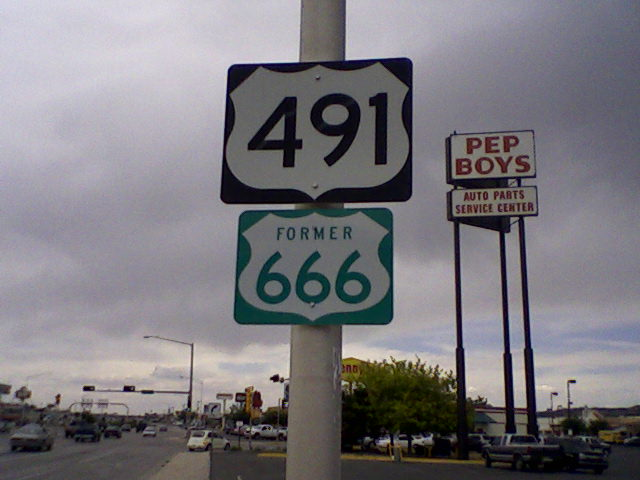
Gallup, New Mexico

US 491 begins at Gallup, at a junction with Interstate 40 (I-40), and currently runs north along Muñoz Drive. The routing has changed to bypass the downtown area. The original route used 9th Street, starting at US 66. US 491 leaves Gallup and passes north through the eastern half of the Navajo Nation. Along the way, the road passes through the small tribal communities and trading posts of Tohatchi, Buffalo Springs, Naschitti, Sheep Springs and Newcomb. The Navajo tribal capital at Window Rock, Arizona, is just west of the highway corridor, accessed by State Road 264 (NM 264). The largest city served by US 491 is Shiprock, which takes its name from one of several extinct volcano cores in the area. Shiprock is known as "the winged rock" in the Navajo language, and the mountain is considered sacred by the Navajo people. Shiprock is where the US 491 crosses the San Juan River and is briefly concurrent with US 64. After passing Shiprock, the route continues north to the Colorado state line. The New Mexico portion has been designated the "John Pinto Highway" by the New Mexico state legislature.

It is on the Trails of the Ancients Byway, one of the designated New Mexico Scenic Byways.

=== Colorado ===
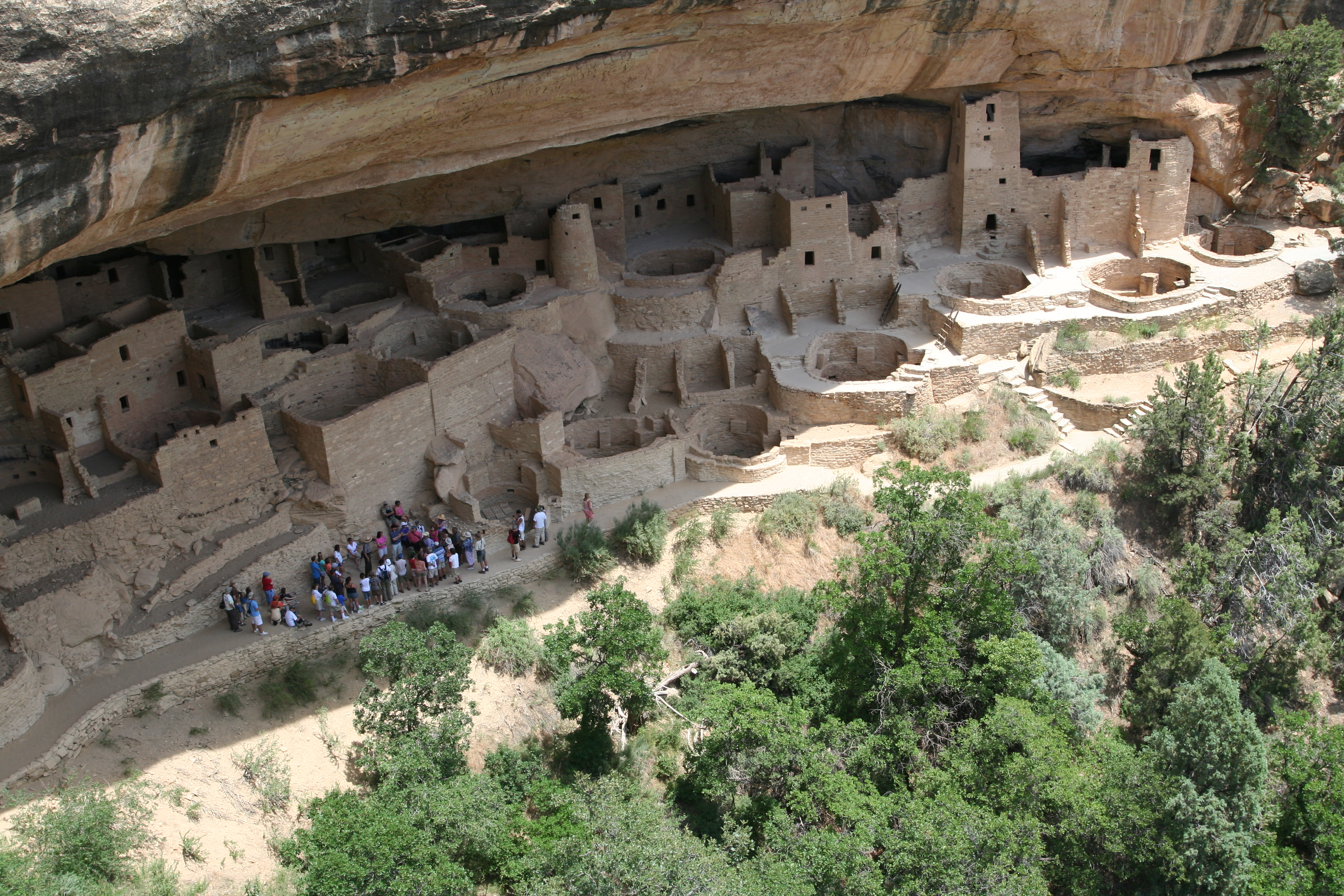
Visitors touring Mesa Verde National Park, along US 491

The New Mexico-Colorado state line is where the highway passes from the Navajo Nation to Ute Mountain Ute tribal lands. The highway passes to the east of the tribe's namesake, Ute Mountain, believed to belong to a great warrior god of the Ute People. US 491 proceeds diagonally to the northwest in the extreme southwestern corner of the state. The highway exits tribal lands near Cortez and Mesa Verde National Park. After leaving Cortez, the road gradually rises in elevation while proceeding towards Utah. Here, the route features large pinto bean farming regions including Dove Creek, which bills itself as the "pinto bean capital of the world". Canyons of the Ancients National Monument is located along the ascent, just west of the highway. Along this ascent is an access road for Hovenweep National Monument at the state line. A portion of the road in Colorado has been designated the Trail of the Ancients, a National Scenic Byway, which uses US 491 as an access for these parks and monuments in southwest Colorado.

=== Utah ===
Once in Utah, US 491 gradually ascends to the Abajo Mountains. Still visible are large farming regions. Upon reaching an elevation of 7,000 feet (2,100 m), the highway arrives at a weigh station and reaches the town of Monticello. US 491 enters the town on Central Street and terminates near the city park at an intersection with US 191, which runs along Main Street. All highways in Utah are codified into law; US 491 is defined at Utah Code Annotated §72-4-137(11).

== History ==
=== Pre-1926 ===
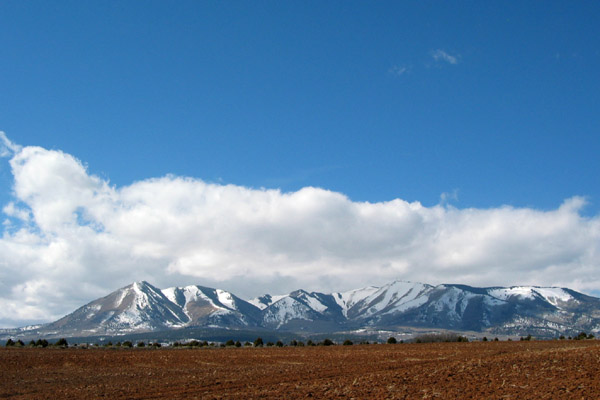
The Abajo Mountains near Monticello

Before the Mexican–American War, when this area was ceded to the United States, the main trade route through this part of Mexico was the Old Spanish Trail. This trail extended from Santa Fe, New Mexico to Los Angeles. The trail had multiple routes; however, the main route proceeded north towards Moab, Utah, one of the few places where the Colorado River can be crossed without having to traverse steep cliffs. The modern US 491 roughly correlates with the main route of the Old Spanish Trail between Cortez, Colorado and its northern terminus.

Before 1926, all of modern US 491 existed as state routes. In New Mexico, US 666 absorbed a portion of State Road 32 (NM 32) from Gallup to Shiprock, and completely replaced NM 121 from Shiprock to the Colorado state line. The portion in Colorado was numbered State Highway 106 (SH 106) from the New Mexico state line to Cortez, and SH 10 from Cortez to Utah. At the time, SH 10 traversed the southern portion of Colorado. While most of this corridor today has a U.S. Highway designation, a portion of SH 10 still exists. In Utah, the route was originally numbered State Route 9 (SR 9), which also included what is now US 191 from Monticello to Crescent Junction. Utah has since re-used the SR 9 designation for a different road.

=== U.S. Route 666 ===
U.S. Route 666
- Location: Gallup, NM – Monticello, UT
- Existed: 1926–2003

The route was upgraded to a U.S. Highway in 1926, as U.S. Route 666. This number was appropriate and in accordance with the road numbering guidelines for U.S. Highways, being the sixth spur along the highway's parent highway, the famed cross-continental highway U.S. Route 66, from which US 491 breaks around Gallup, New Mexico. This number was assigned by the American Association of State Highway Officials (AASHO), a coordinating body that created the U.S. Highway System. At that time, the northern terminus of the route was in Cortez, at an intersection with then US 450 (modern US 160).

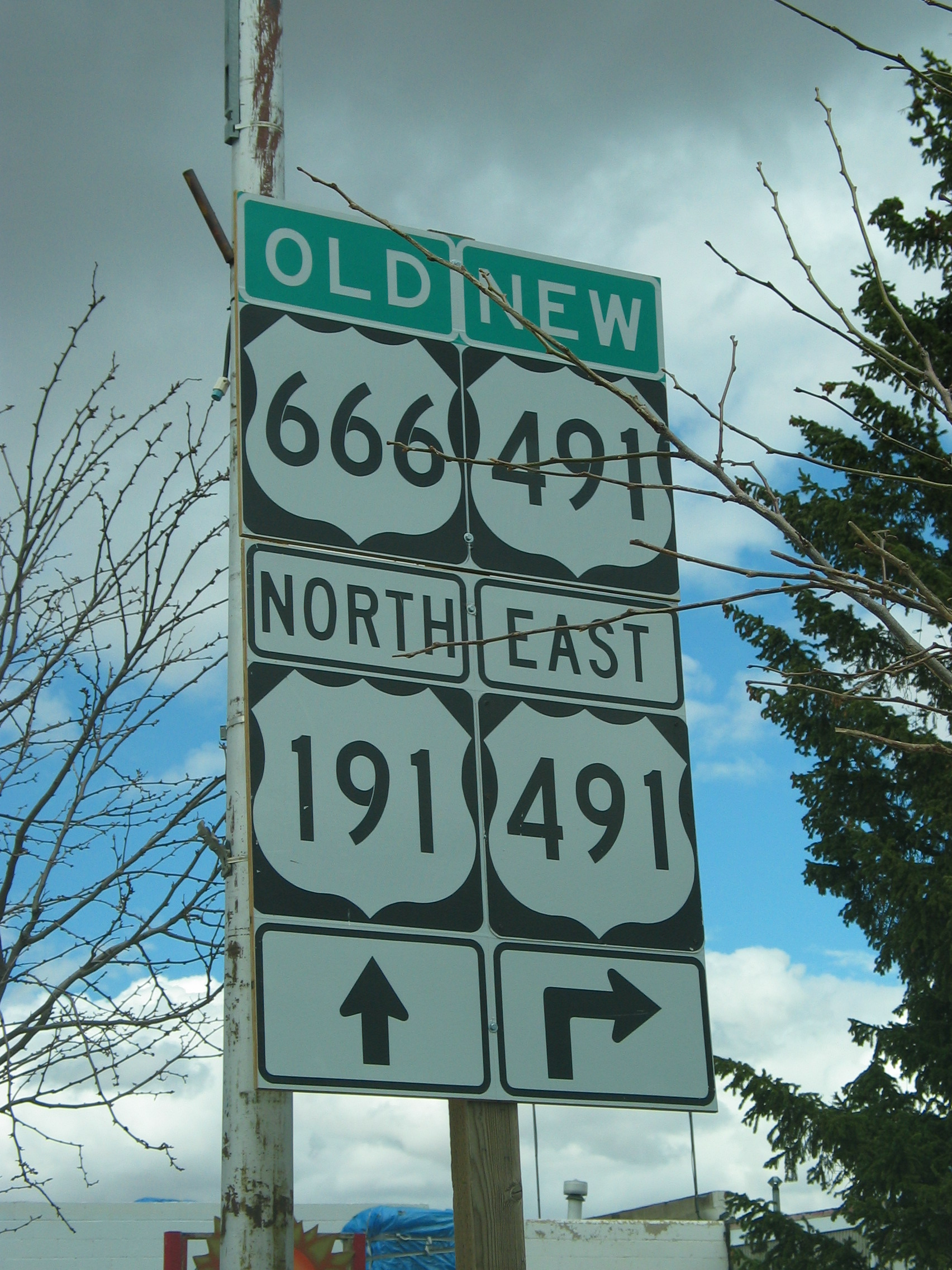
Old and new route number at the intersection with US 191 in Monticello

Over time the route became known as the "Devil's Highway", a reference to the Number of the Beast. This nickname and association made some visitors uncomfortable, as well as making the signs targets for theft. Because of the highway's number, accidents and other phenomena, this became repeated as legend. These legends convinced some people the highway was cursed. One unnamed highway patrol officer was quoted in USA Today as stating a drunk-driving suspect told him, "Triple 6 is evil. Everyone dies on that highway." Skeptics point out that the highway has a lower than average fatality rate in Utah and Colorado; only the New Mexico portion is statistically a dangerous highway. Skeptics further state the high fatality rate in New Mexico can be explained by an inadequate design for the traffic loads at the time. During the renumbering debate, the Albuquerque Journal opined that the planned highway improvements would do more to reduce fatalities than the renumbering itself.

The curse of US 666 is briefly discussed in Jonathan D. Rosenblum's book, Copper Crucible, which investigates the Arizona Copper Mine Strike of 1983. This strike occurred along the highway near Morenci, Arizona. The highway was used as a plot element in films and television, including Route 666, Natural Born Killers, and Repo Man, as well as a two-part episode of the series Married... with Children, titled "Route 666". These pieces are not accurate in portraying the route; for example, one depicts the route in Nevada.

=== Extensions into Arizona and Utah ===
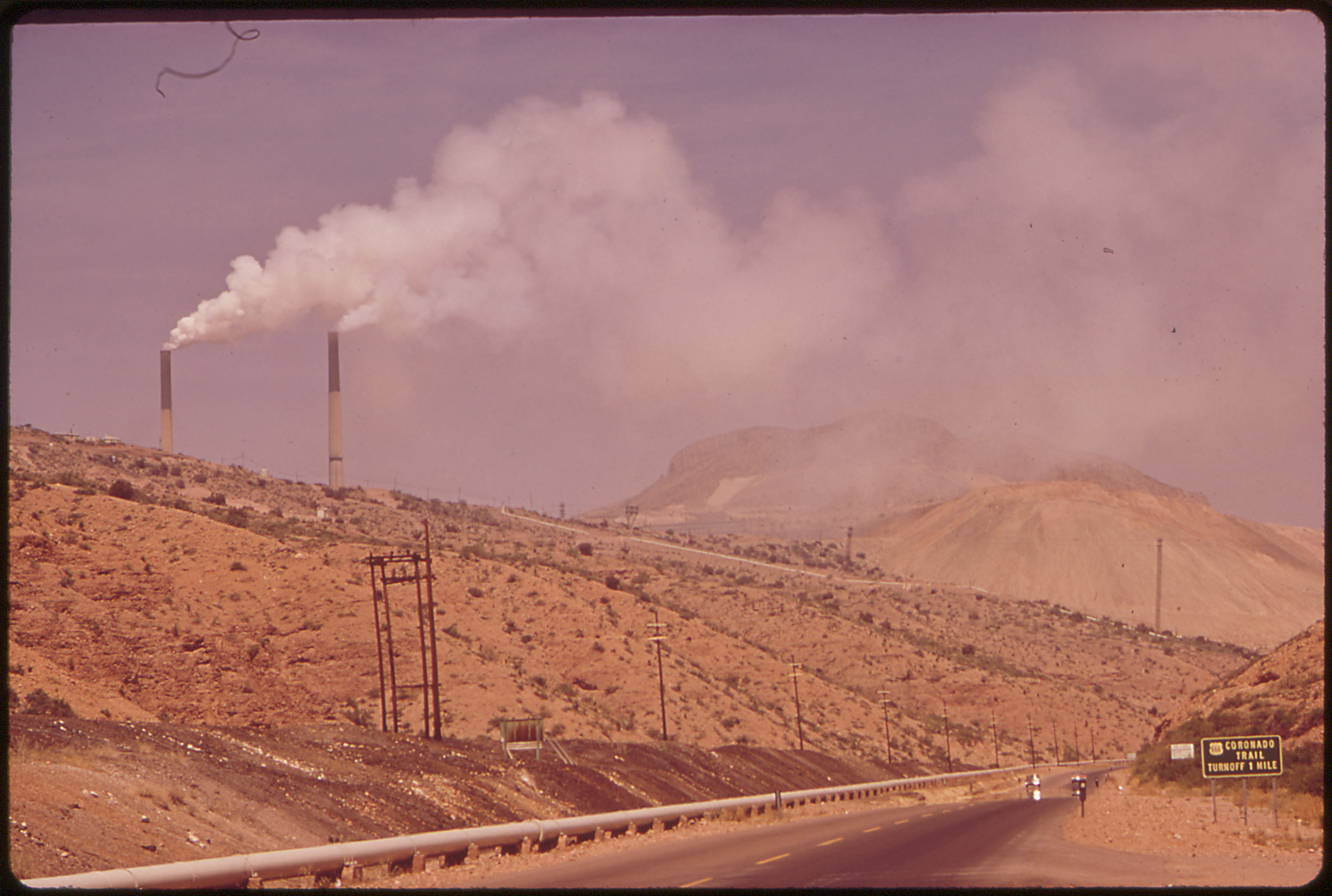
US 666 through Morenci, Arizona in June 1972

On December 4, 1938, the southern terminus of the route was extended from Gallup across the Arizona state line to US 80 in Douglas, near the Mexican border. It ran concurrent with US 66 for 30 miles (48.3 km) before the turn south. Prior to the extension, the route between Douglas and Sanders was designated as SR 81. The Arizona portion of the highway is known as the Coronado Trail Scenic Byway, as it approximated the path of the Spanish explorer, Francisco Vásquez de Coronado. This portion is noted for mountainous terrain, with hairpin turns and steep grades, that reaches an altitude of over 9,000 feet (2,700 m). The curves force a speed limit of 10 miles per hour (16 km/h) in spots.

In 1970, several U.S. Highways in the Four Corners region were re-aligned. As part of this change, US 160 was rerouted west of Cortez to serve the Four Corners Monument and enter Arizona instead of Utah. US 666 was extended up part of the old route of US 160 to Monticello, Utah, at an intersection with then US 163 (now US 191).

In 1985, the Utah Department of Transportation petitioned to extend US 666 northwest to Richfield, but the proposal was rejected. The proposed extension followed SR 95, SR 24, and SR 119. A concurrency with US 191 would have been routed through Blanding and Monticello to connect to the rest of the route. One of the reasons cited for rejecting the proposal was that portions of SR 24 were not built to standards desired for additions to the U.S. Highway System.

=== Elimination and renumbering of US 666 ===
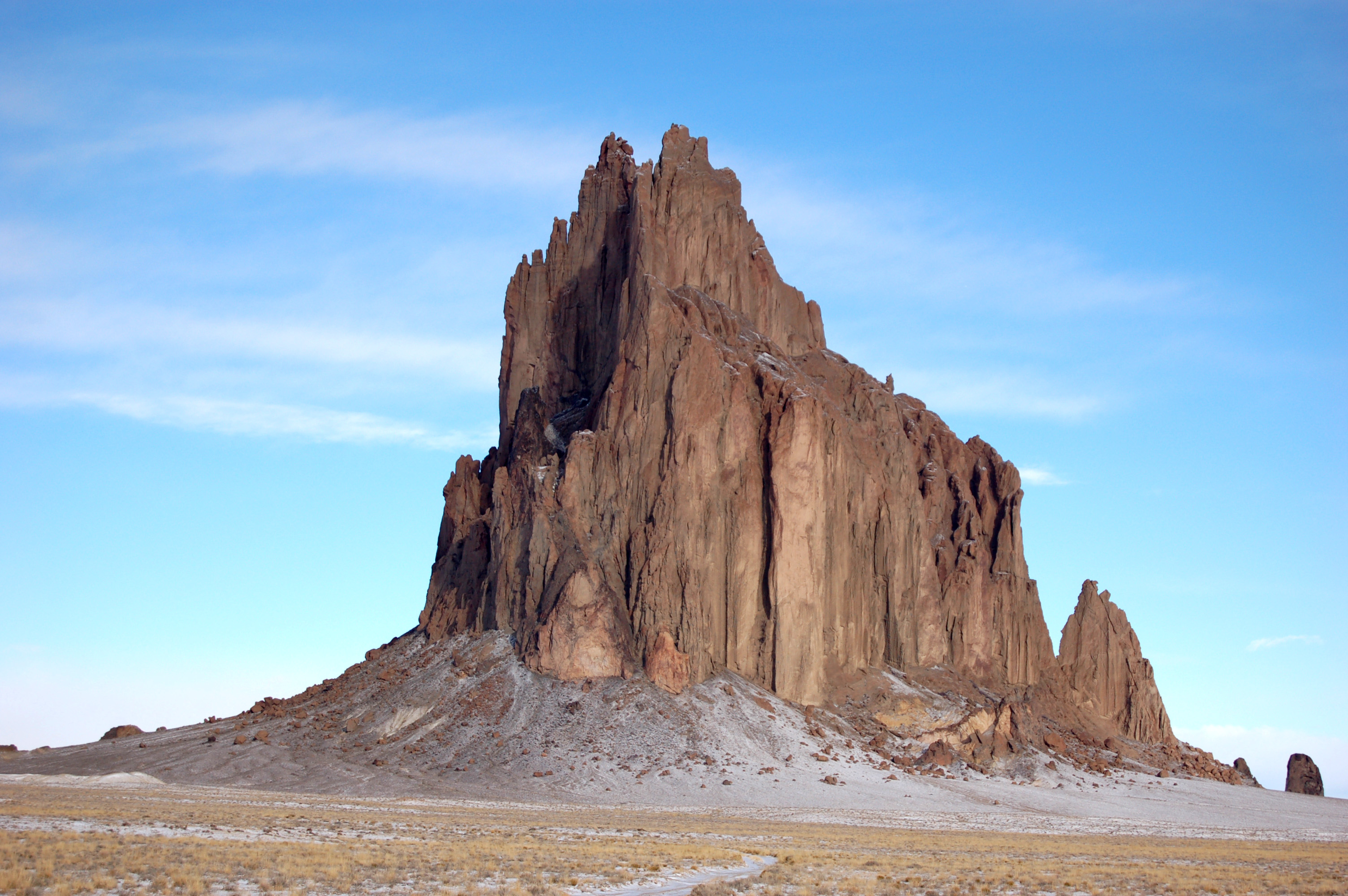
Shiprock, a sacred mountain to the Navajo people, is accessed via US 491

In 1985, the US 66 designation was eliminated, leaving US 666 (and other routes) as "orphans". This fact would be used as a supporting factor in later petitions to renumber the highway. In 1992, the part in Arizona was renumbered as an extension of US 191. This truncated US 666 again at Gallup, New Mexico, now at I-40.

The route in the other three states became U.S. Route 491 in 2003, mainly through efforts of New Mexico Governor Bill Richardson. He requested the change due to the "infamy brought by the inopportune naming of the road". While campaigning for governor, Richardson promised to renumber the highway as part of a larger plan to improve the highway and build relations between New Mexico and the Navajo Nation. Although traditional Navajo culture does not share the belief of 666 being an evil number, some Navajos had attempted for years to change the number as a way to raise awareness about the dangerous highway. The highway had largely been ignored, with few improvements made since it was first paved. By 1997, US 666 was named one of the 20 most dangerous highways in the United States. Some Navajo leaders were concerned that efforts to reduce poverty on Navajo lands, via promoting tourism and outside investment, were being hampered by the Christian aversion to the number.

In New Mexico's motion to renumber the highway, they selected U.S. Route 393. Since the route came nowhere near US 93, AASHTO instead suggested US 491, noting it as a branch of US 191 at Monticello, Utah. Although the next three-digit child of US 91 would have been U.S. Route 291, both the 291 and 391 designations were already in use as state route numbers in at least one of the affected states. At the news that the motion had passed, a New Mexico spokesperson stated, "The devil's out of here, and we say goodbye and good riddance." Referring to the motion passing with a different number from what New Mexico requested, another spokesperson responded, "As long as it's not 666 and it's nothing satanic, that's OK." US 666 officially ceased to exist on May 31, 2003, although temporary "New 491 – Old 666" signs were posted after the change to aid travelers using old maps.

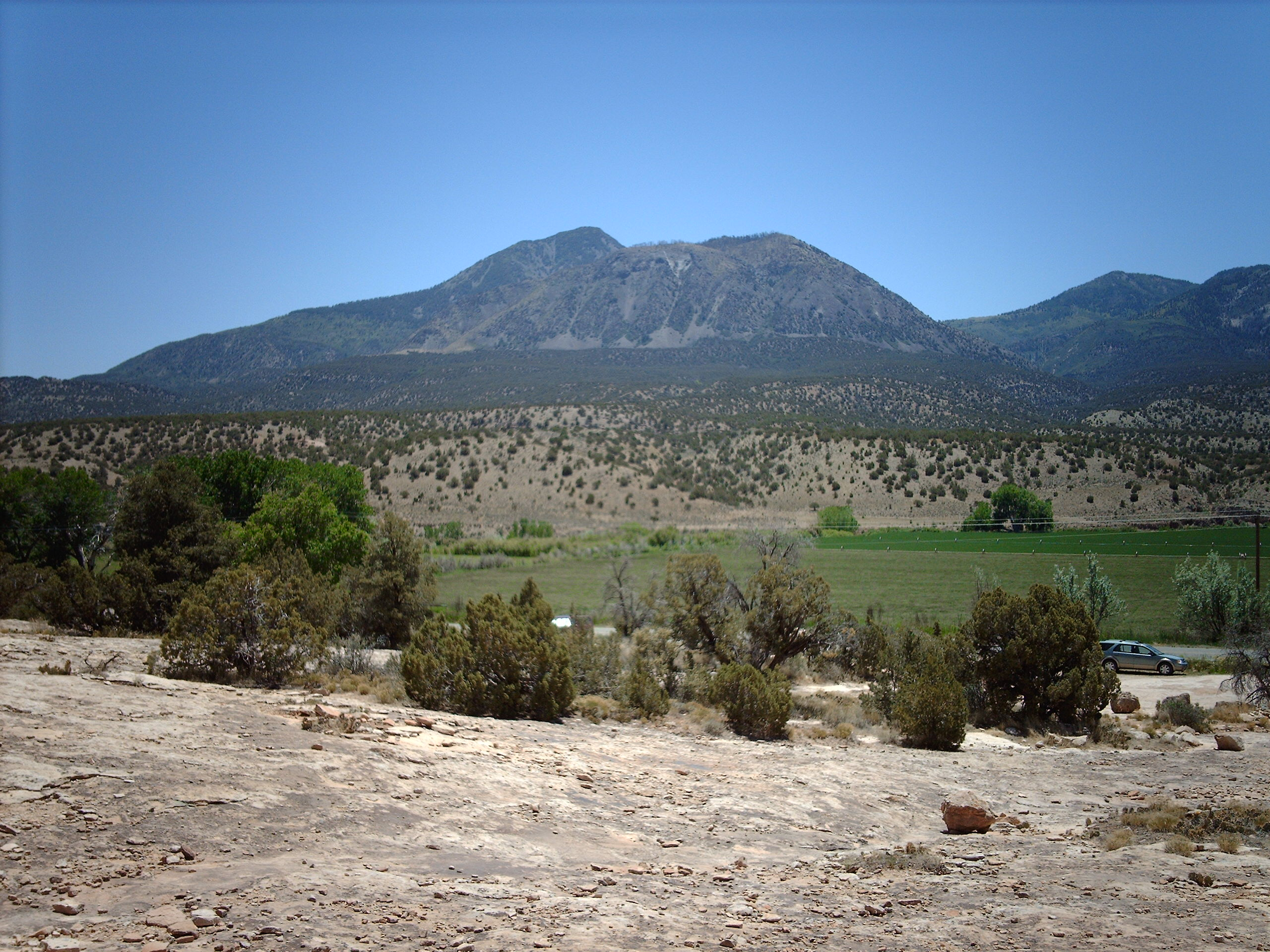
Ute Mountain, in southwest Colorado, is the sacred mountain, and namesake of the Ute Mountain Ute Tribe

Although sign theft had always been a problem along this highway, thefts reached epidemic proportions when the pending number change was announced. Within days of the announcement, virtually every US 666 sign had been stolen, some for sale on eBay. Officials in Utah reported that five entire sign assemblies had been cut down with a chainsaw and stolen, while New Mexico officials reported that even signs welded to metal posts, as a theft deterrent, had been stolen. Officials speculated from one scene that someone had intentionally crashed a car into the sign post to break the welds.

The dedication of the "new" highway was postponed until July 30, 2003, to coincide with the start of construction projects to improve safety on the highway. At the dedication George Blue Horse, a Navajo medicine man, performed a ceremony to remove the curse from the highway. In the Navajo language he stated, "The road itself never ends. It goes on generation to generation. The new number is a good one. The new road will be a medicine."

Newspapers and television stations interviewed people along the route about their opinions on the changing of the highway's number. Even some people who believed in the 666 curse disagreed with the change. One went on record as stating highway officials, "are messing with the wrong guy. They're making the devil mad. They should have left the 666 alone." Others were more sarcastic. One Monticello resident stated, "We'll really miss all the potheads stopping and taking pictures of the Route 666 sign." Most residents took pride in living along the Devil's Highway and opposed the change. Some commented that no matter the number they would still call the road the Devil's Highway.

=== Post-renumbering ===
Since the renumbering in 2003, portions of US 491 in New Mexico have been upgraded to a four-lane divided highway, with grade separations at the busiest interchanges. The New Mexico Department of Transportation has noted that, as sections are upgraded, fatality rates improve on the four-lane portions, but remain high on the two-lane portions. As construction has proceeded, the most dangerous portions of the highway have moved to points where the four-lane portion ends, and traffic merges to two lanes. This has caused the department to coordinate the phases of the upgrades to minimize the number of two-lane/four-lane transitions. Construction on the final phase was originally scheduled to begin January 2008, however the state applied for American Recovery and Reinvestment Act funds to finish the project and completion was delayed until 2012.

== Major intersections ==
Note: The Utah mileposts are posted in a west-to-east direction, while Colorado's and New Mexico's mileposts are posted in a south-to-north direction. All exits are unnumbered.

State	County	Location	mi	km	Destinations	Notes
New Mexico	McKinley	Gallup	0.000	0.000	NM 602 south – Zuni Pueblo; I-40 – Albuquerque, Flagstaff	Southern terminus; I-40 exit 20; road continues beyond I-40 as NM 602
New Mexico	McKinley	Yah-ta-hey	7.002	11.269	NM 264 west	Interchange; left exit northbound, left entrances
New Mexico	San Juan	Sheep Springs	47.250	76.042	NM 134 west – Crystal	
New Mexico	San Juan	Shiprock	91.186	146.750	US 64 west – Teec Nos Pos	South end of US 64 overlap; former NM 504
New Mexico	San Juan	Shiprock	92.038	148.121	US 64 east – Farmington	North end of US 64 overlap
			107.308 0.000	172.695 0.000	New Mexico–Colorado line	
Colorado	Montezuma		6.422	10.335	US 160 west – Four Corners	South end of US 160 overlap
Colorado	Montezuma	Cortez	26.371	42.440	US 160 east (Main Street) – Durango	North end of US 160 overlap
Colorado	Montezuma		36.801	59.225	SH 184 east – Dolores	
Colorado	Montezuma		45.131	72.631	Hovenweep National Monument, Canyons of the Ancients National Monument	
Colorado	Dolores	Dove Creek	63.272	101.826	SH 141 north – Egnar, Uravan	
			69.602 17.020	112.014 27.391	Colorado–Utah line	
Utah	San Juan	Monticello	0.000	0.000	US 191 (Main Street) – Moab, Blanding	Northern terminus; road continues as Center Street; US-191 north is former US-160 west
1.000 mi = 1.609 km; 1.000 km = 0.621 mi: Concurrency terminus

== See also ==
- List of U.S. Highways in Colorado
- List of U.S. Highways in New Mexico
- List of U.S. Highways in Utah
- Hexakosioihexekontahexaphobia, fear of the number 666
- List of highways numbered 666
- List of highways numbered 491
