= Window Rock, Arizona =

Capital of the Navajo Nation in Arizona, United States

Window Rock Tségháhoodzání (Navajo)
- Census-designated city Capital of the Navajo Nation
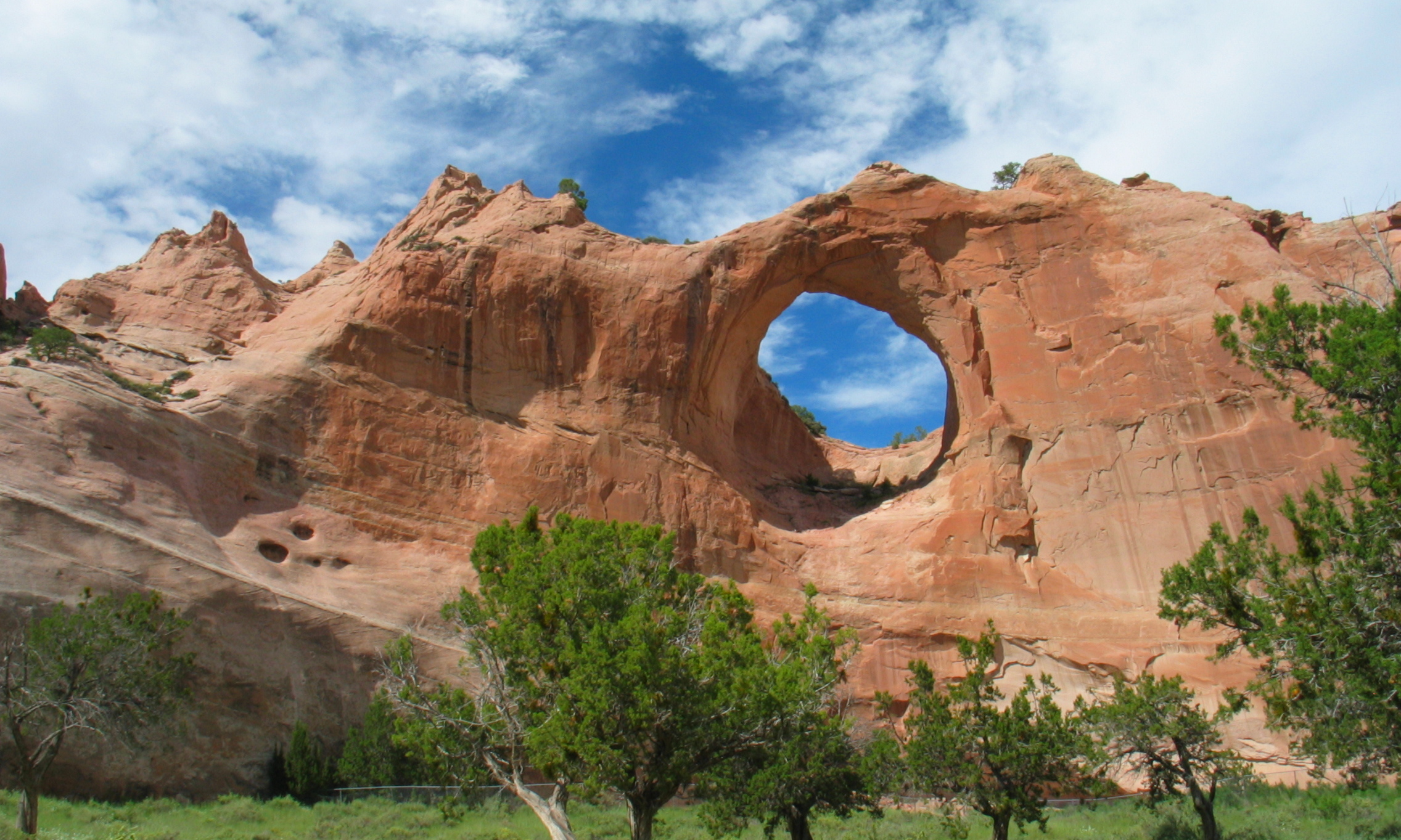
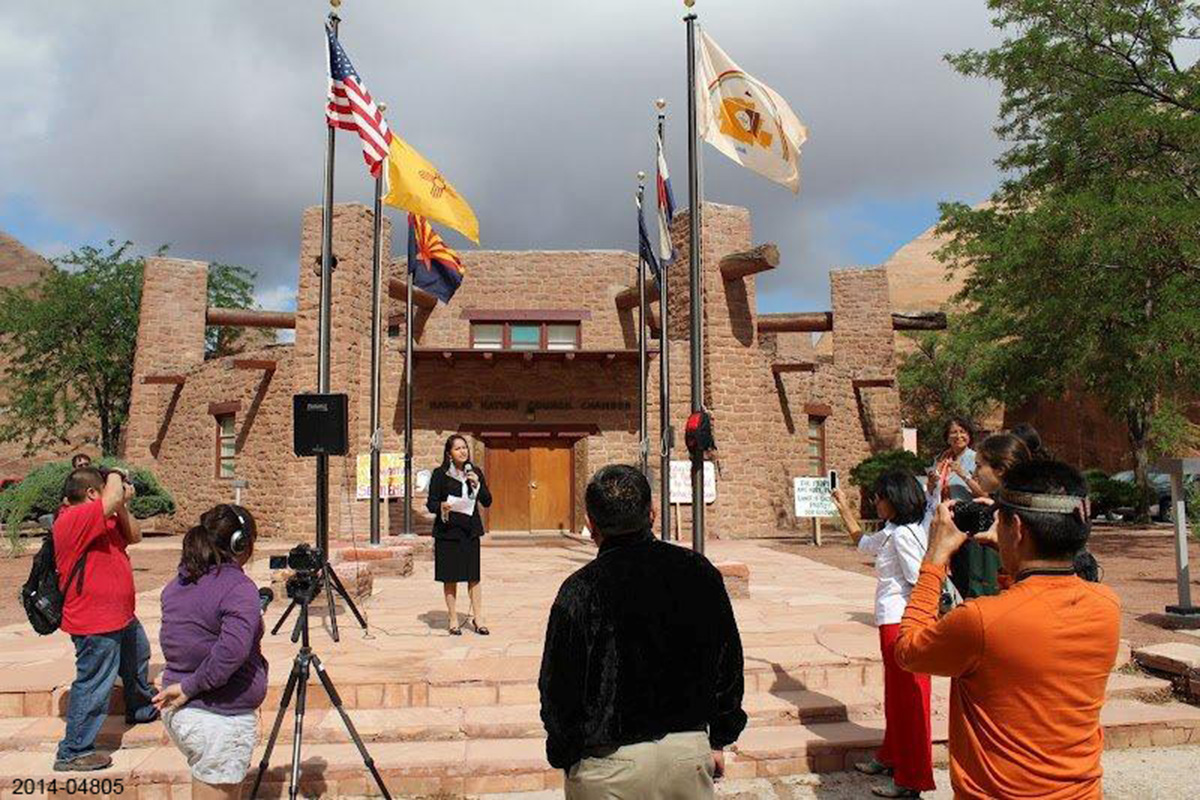
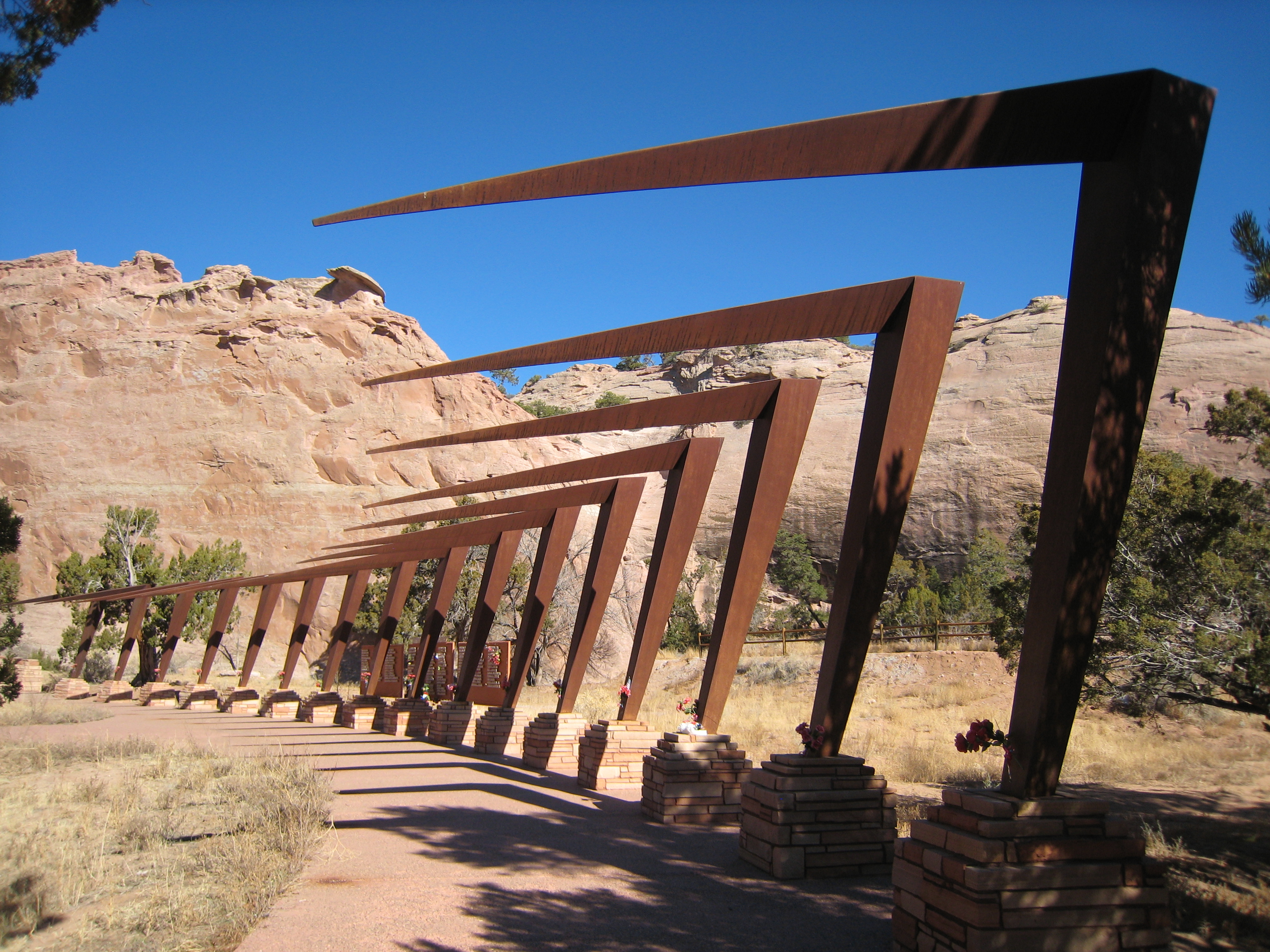
- Tségháhoodzání, the "Window Rock" Navajo Nation Council Chamber WWII Navajo Code Talker Memorial

- Location in Apache County and the state of Arizona

- Location in the United States Window Rock (the United States)
- Coordinates: 35°40′14″N 109°03′50″W
- Country: United States
- State: Arizona
- County: Apache
- Indian Reservation: Navajo Nation
- Navajo Nation: Tsʼíhootso Navajo Chapter

Government
  - Type: St. Michaels Chapter Government
  - Chapter President: Curran Hannon

Area
  - Census-designated city Capital of the Navajo Nation: 5.29 sq mi (13.70 km^{2})
  - Land: 5.29 sq mi (13.69 km^{2})
  - Water: 0 sq mi (0.00 km^{2})
- Elevation: 6,765 ft (2,062 m)

Population (2020)
  - Census-designated city Capital of the Navajo Nation: 2,500
  - Density: 472.8/sq mi (182.56/km^{2})
  - Metro: 6,336
- Time zone: UTC-7 (MST)
  - Summer (DST): UTC-6 (MDT)
- ZIP code: 86515
- Area code: 928
- FIPS code: 04-83720
- GNIS feature ID: 2409610

Window Rock, known in Navajo as Tségháhoodzání (pronounced [tsʰéɰáhòːtsání]), is a city and census-designated place that serves as the capital of the Navajo Nation, the largest Native American tribe by both land and tribal enrollment. The capital lies in Apache County, and is within the boundaries of the St. Michaels Chapter, adjacent to the Arizona and New Mexico state line. Window Rock is the site of the Navajo Nation governmental campus, which contains the Navajo Nation Council, Navajo Nation Supreme Court, the offices of the Navajo Nation President and Vice President, and many Navajo government buildings.

Window Rock's population was 2,500 at the 2020 census. It is estimated to reach around 20,000 during weekdays when tribal offices are open.

Window Rock's main natural attraction is the window formation of sandstone, after which the community is named. The Navajo Nation Museum, the Navajo Nation Zoological and Botanical Park, and the Navajo Nation Code Talkers World War II memorial are tribal attractions located in Window Rock.

== Name ==
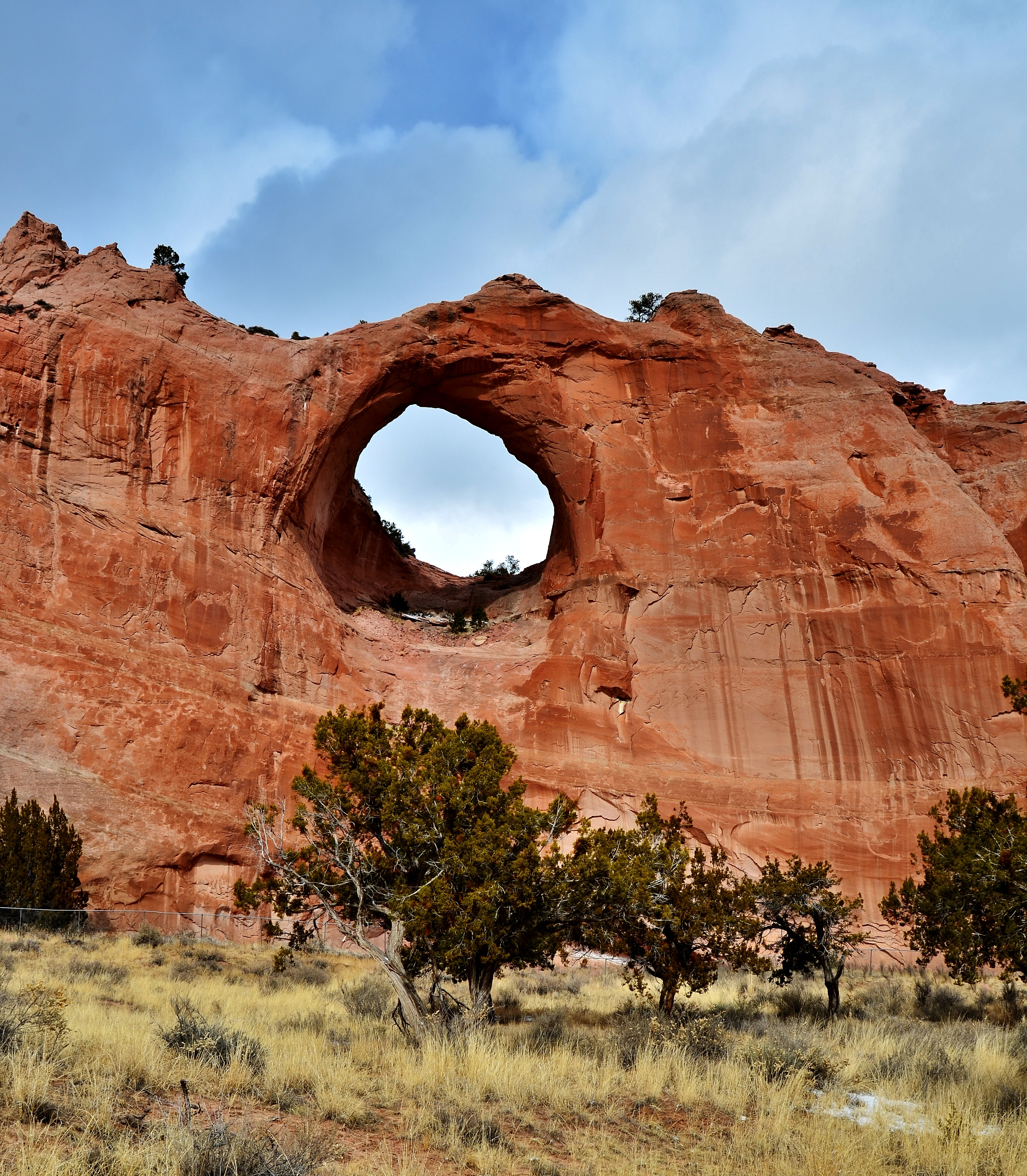
Tségháhoodzání, the "Window Rock"

Until 1936, the area was sparsely populated and known by the Navajo only by its ceremonial name Niʼ Ałníiʼgi ("Center of the World"). John Collier, a reforming Commissioner of Indian Affairs, chose this site to establish the seat of the Navajo Central Agency, the Bureau of Indian Affairs official connection to the nation. His proposal to make the ceremonial name the official name met with resistance, and Navajos soon ridiculed it as "ni ałnííʼgóó" (~ "into your middle (parts)").

Due to this, the BIA chose the name of the major local landmark, the rock-with-hole-through-it (Navajo: tségháhoodzání) for this Indian agency site. It was rendered in English as Window Rock. This landmark is north of the Navajo governmental administration buildings. It is important in the traditional Navajo Water Way Ceremony (Tóee), as one of the four places where Navajo medicine men go with their traditional woven water jugs to get water for the ceremony that is held to pray for an abundance of rainfall.

== Government ==
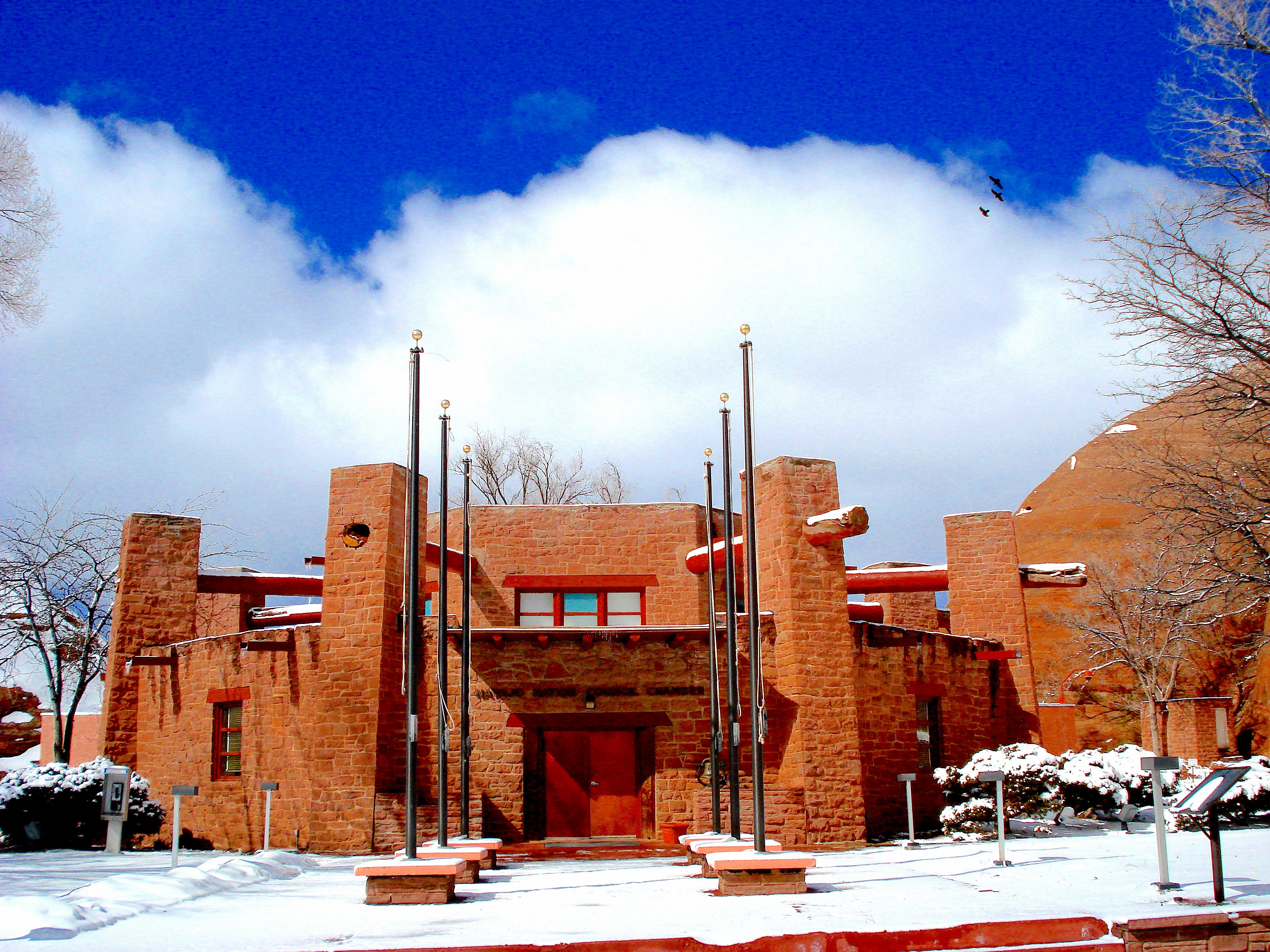
The Navajo Nation Council Chamber hosts the legislative branch of the nation, known as the Navajo Nation Council.

Window Rock is the capital of the Navajo Nation's government. Its complex houses the Navajo Nation President and Vice President, Navajo Nation Supreme Court, the 24-member Navajo Nation Council, and Navajo government administration buildings. As a district within the St. Michaels Chapter, Window Rock is served by a Navajo Council Delegate and Chapter President and Vice President.

== Demographics ==
Historical population
Census	Pop.	Note	%±
1980	2,230		—
1990	3,306		48.3%
2000	3,059		−7.5%
2010	2,712		−11.3%
2020	2,500		−7.8%
U.S. Decennial Census

As of the census of 2000, there were 3,059 people, 876 households, and 713 families residing in the CDP. The population density was 589.3 inhabitants per square mile (227.5/km^{2}). There were 998 housing units at an average density of 192.3 per square mile (74.2/km^{2}). The racial makeup of the CDP was 95.5% Native American, 3.2% White, 0.4% Asian, 0.2% African American, <0.1% Pacific Islander, 0.1% from other races, and 0.7% from two or more races. Hispanic or Latino of any race were 1.4% of the population.

There were 876 households, out of which 51.0% had children under the age of 18 living with them, 43.7% were married couples living together, 29.7% had a female householder with no husband present, and 18.6% were non-families. 15.6% of all households were made up of individuals, and 2.4% had someone living alone who was 65 years of age or older. The average household size was 3.42 and the average family size was 3.81.

In the CDP, the age distribution of the population shows 36.3% under the age of 18, 10.9% from 18 to 24, 28.7% from 25 to 44, 19.6% from 45 to 64, and 4.5% who were 65 years of age or older. The median age was 27 years. For every 100 females, there were 92.6 males. For every 100 females age 18 and over, there were 88.4 males.

The median income for a household in the CDP was $36,885, and the median income for a family was $36,500. Males had a median income of $27,266 versus $26,902 for females. The per capita income for the CDP was $11,122. About 24.6% of families and 24.6% of the population were below the poverty line, including 28.6% of those under age 18 and 6.8% of those age 65 or over.

Languages (2000)	Percent
Spoke Navajo at home	57%
Spoke English at home	43%

== Geography ==
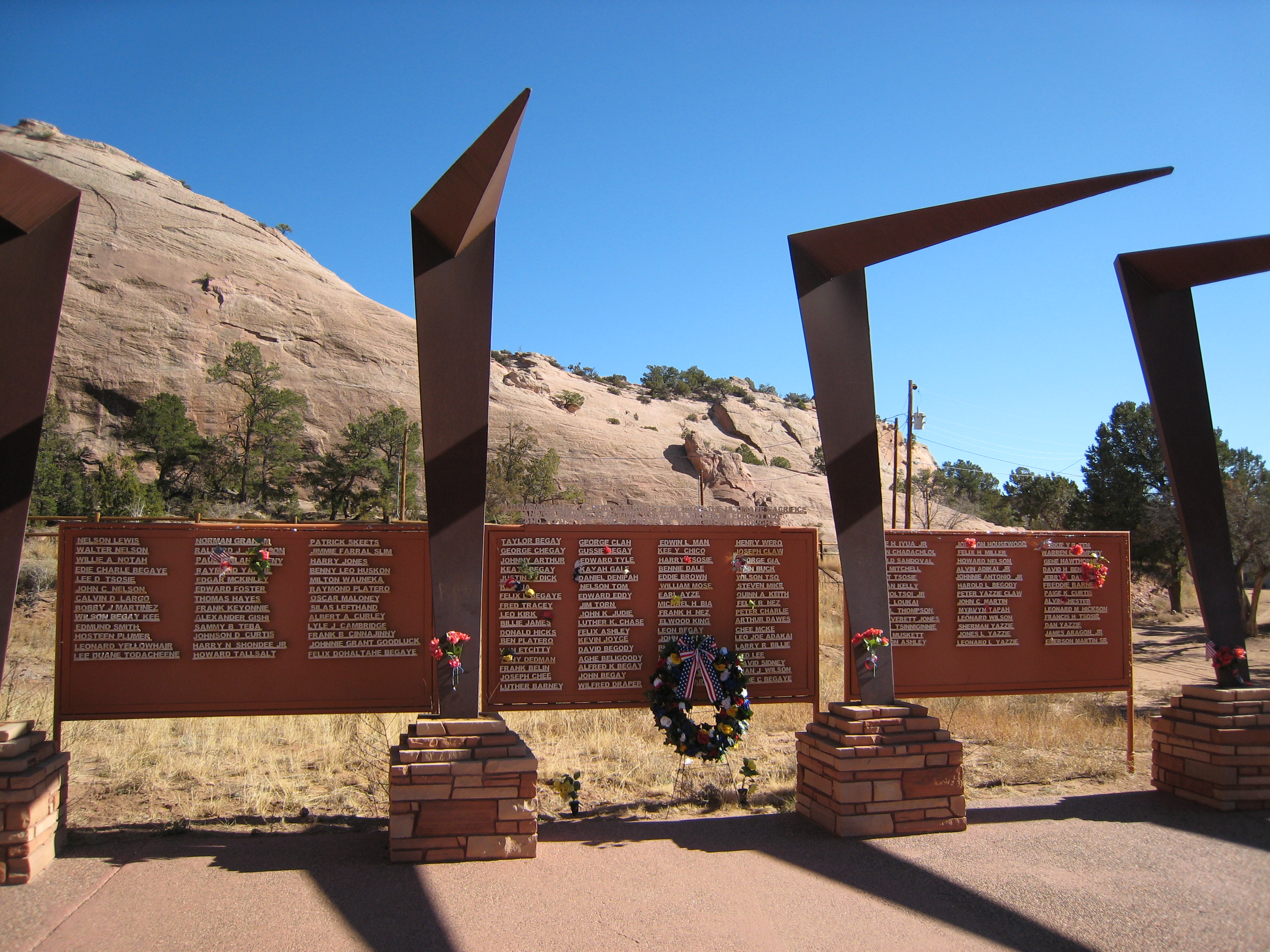
Navajo Nation World War II Memorial

The Arizona/New Mexico state line marks the town's eastern edge, and some of the town's buildings are located a few feet (meters) from the state line. Immediately across the state line from Window Rock is the village of Tse Bonito, New Mexico.

The greater Window Rock area comprises the Fort Defiance and St. Michaels chapters, and the hamlets of Hunter's Point and the Summit in Arizona, and Tse Bonito on the New Mexico side of the border.

According to the United States Census Bureau, Window Rock CDP (census designated place) has a total area of 5.3 square miles (13.7 km^{2}), all land. The area is atop and encompassed within the Defiance Plateau.

=== Climate ===
Window Rock is categorized as being within the 6a USDA hardiness zone, meaning the average annual extreme minimum temperature is between −10 and −5 °F (−23 and −21 °C). The city is cooler than most of Arizona due to its high elevation.

Climate data for Window Rock, Arizona (Window Rock Airport), (Note: 6,830 feet above sea level) (1991–2020 normals, extremes 1998–present)
Month	Jan	Feb	Mar	Apr	May	Jun	Jul	Aug	Sep	Oct	Nov	Dec	Year
Record high °F (°C)	63 (17)	70 (21)	77 (25)	83 (28)	92 (33)	101 (38)	98 (37)	97 (36)	96 (36)	86 (30)	81 (27)	66 (19)	101 (38)
Mean maximum °F (°C)	57.2 (14.0)	61.7 (16.5)	70.0 (21.1)	77.1 (25.1)	85.4 (29.7)	93.6 (34.2)	94.6 (34.8)	90.5 (32.5)	86.9 (30.5)	78.8 (26.0)	70.3 (21.3)	59.7 (15.4)	95.4 (35.2)
Mean daily maximum °F (°C)	45.3 (7.4)	49.2 (9.6)	57.5 (14.2)	64.8 (18.2)	74.1 (23.4)	85.4 (29.7)	88.4 (31.3)	84.6 (29.2)	78.9 (26.1)	67.8 (19.9)	56.3 (13.5)	45.6 (7.6)	66.5 (19.2)
Daily mean °F (°C)	29.9 (−1.2)	34.2 (1.2)	40.7 (4.8)	46.8 (8.2)	55.1 (12.8)	65.2 (18.4)	71.5 (21.9)	68.5 (20.3)	60.8 (16.0)	49.2 (9.6)	38.6 (3.7)	29.7 (−1.3)	49.2 (9.5)
Mean daily minimum °F (°C)	14.4 (−9.8)	19.2 (−7.1)	23.8 (−4.6)	28.8 (−1.8)	36.2 (2.3)	45.0 (7.2)	54.7 (12.6)	52.4 (11.3)	42.7 (5.9)	30.6 (−0.8)	20.8 (−6.2)	13.8 (−10.1)	31.9 (−0.1)
Mean minimum °F (°C)	−5.8 (−21.0)	1.3 (−17.1)	8.7 (−12.9)	15.7 (−9.1)	23.2 (−4.9)	32.3 (0.2)	43.4 (6.3)	42.3 (5.7)	28.6 (−1.9)	17.9 (−7.8)	5.0 (−15.0)	−5.1 (−20.6)	−9.6 (−23.1)
Record low °F (°C)	−25 (−32)	−23 (−31)	−8 (−22)	10 (−12)	13 (−11)	26 (−3)	37 (3)	35 (2)	22 (−6)	1 (−17)	−5 (−21)	−17 (−27)	−25 (−32)
Average precipitation inches (mm)	1.04 (26)	0.87 (22)	0.66 (17)	0.46 (12)	0.57 (14)	0.28 (7.1)	1.78 (45)	1.85 (47)	1.34 (34)	0.92 (23)	0.75 (19)	0.83 (21)	11.35 (288)
Average precipitation days (≥ 0.01 inch)	6.1	6.0	5.4	4.5	4.4	2.8	10.6	10.9	7.0	6.3	5.2	7.0	76.2
Source 1: NOAA
Source 2: National Weather Service

== Education ==
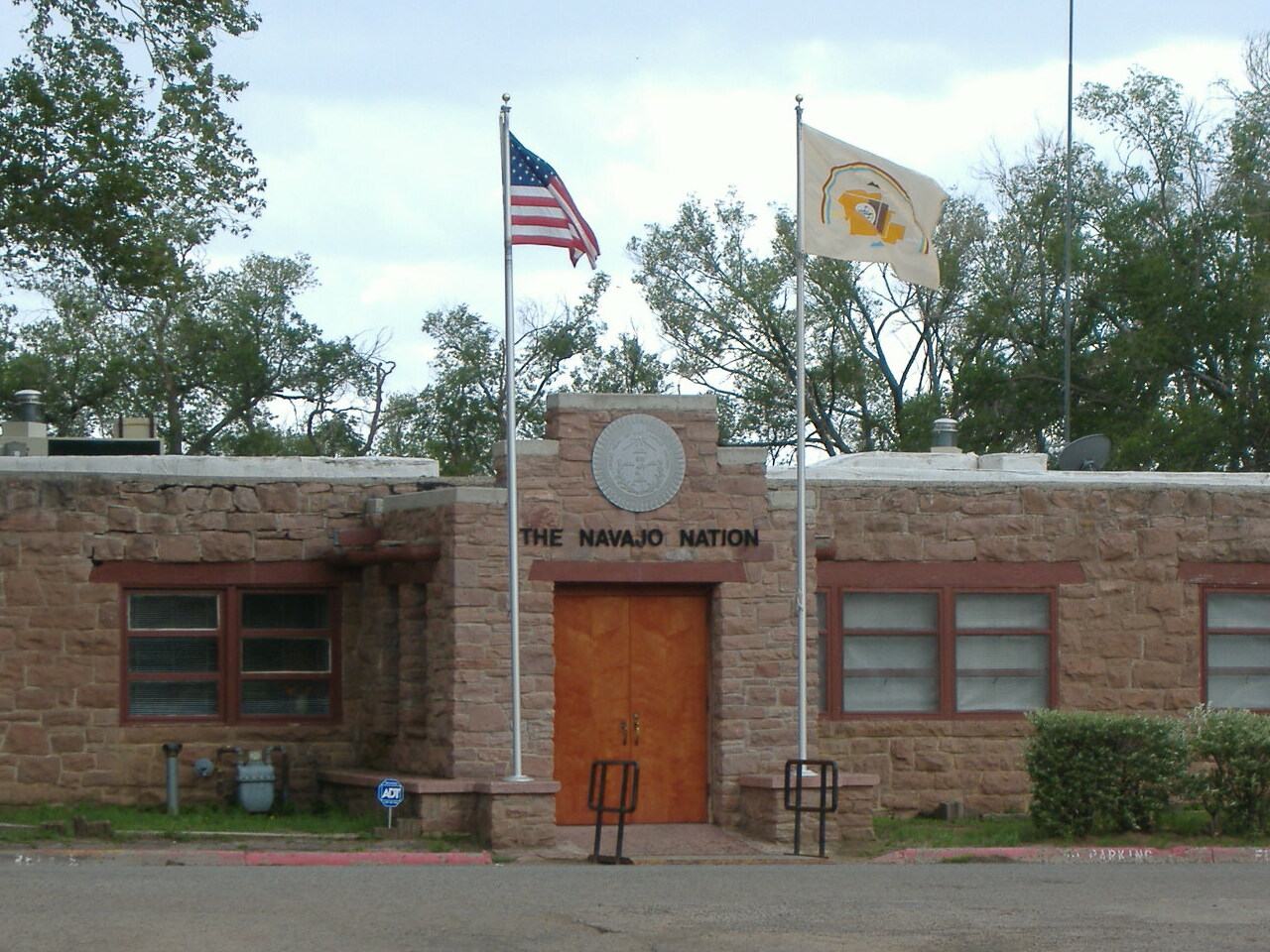
Office of the President of the Navajo Nation.

Window Rock is a part of the Window Rock Unified School District, which serves the greater Fort Defiance and St. Michaels chapters population center.

Window Rock is served by:

- Window Rock Elementary School
- Tséhootsooí Middle School
- Window Rock High School located in the Fort Defiance Chapter.

The community is also served by the private Saint Michael Indian School, a K-12 private, Catholic school established by Katharine Drexel in 1902. Saint Michael Indian School is a member of the National Catholic Education Association and the Roman Catholic Diocese of Gallup Catholic School System.

The surrounding community is also served by Hilltop Christian School, operated by Across Nations offering pre-K through 6th grade learning curriculum.

In addition, the Saint Michaels Association for Special Education, Inc. (SMASE) school serves the greater Navajo Nation in Arizona and New Mexico. A non-profit school, founded by Sister Marijane Ryan in 1970 serves as an educational and residential center for individuals with disabilities of all ages.

== Travel and tourism ==
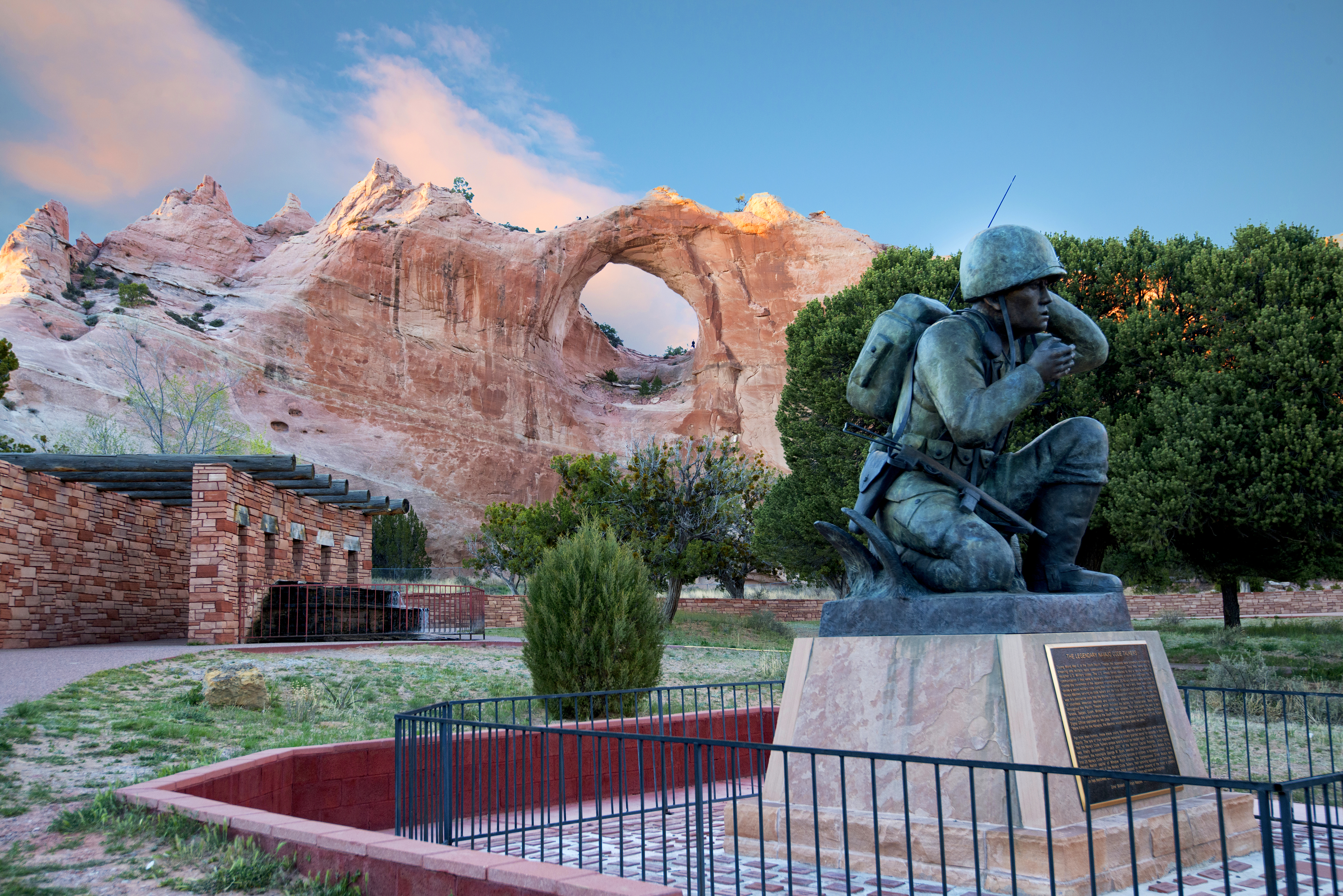
The World War II Navajo Code Talkers Memorial in Window Rock.

Tourism is an integral part of the local economy. Window Rock attracts a large number of tourists and visitors due to its close proximity to many national parks and sites and Navajo government. The area is a popular base of commerce for the regional people as well.

Window Rock is close to:

- Hubbell Trading Post National Historic Site
- Diné College
- Petrified Forest National Park
- Canyon de Chelly National Monument
- Chaco Culture National Historical Park
- Gallup, New Mexico

=== Navajo Nation Museum ===
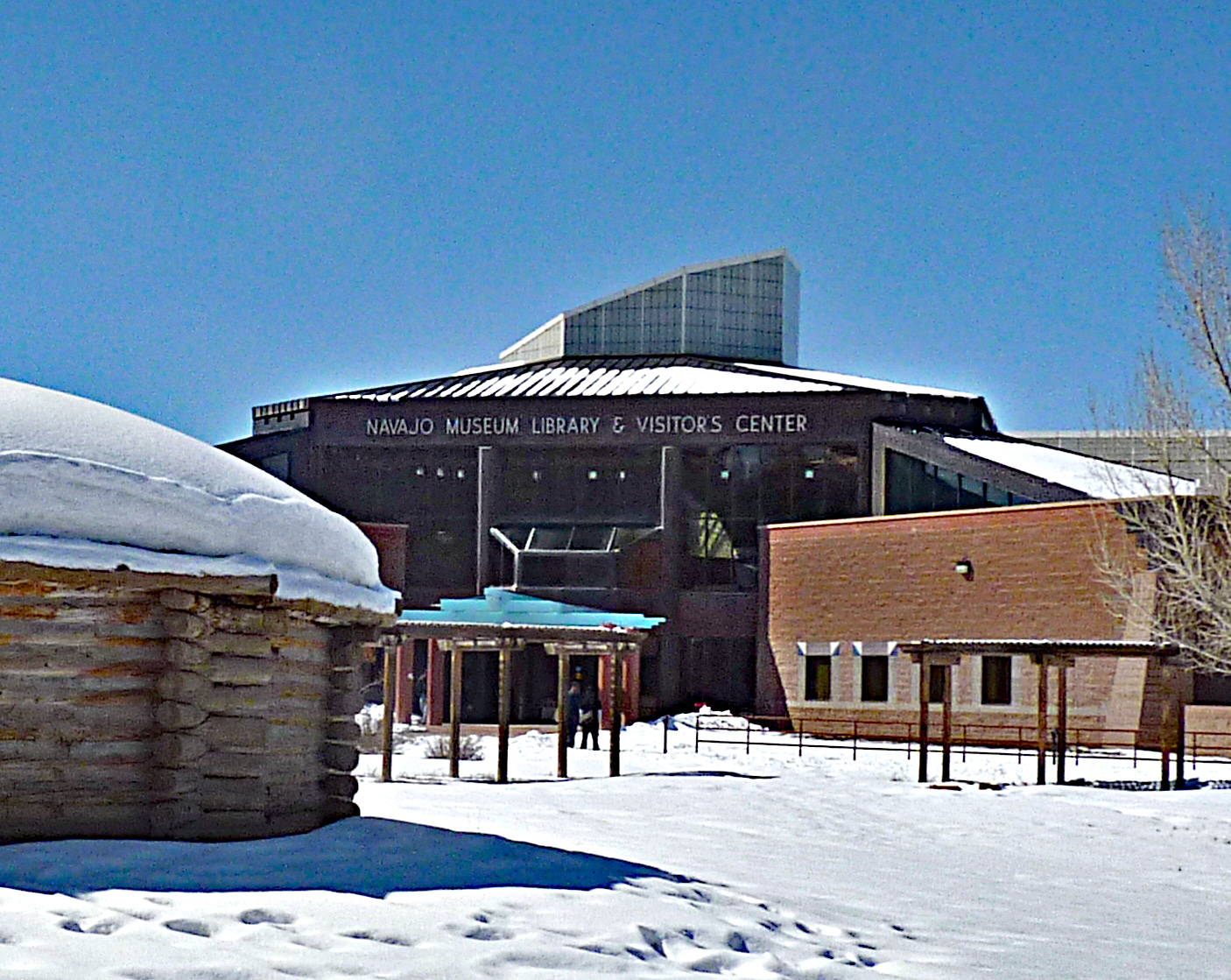
Navajo Nation Museum

In 1961, the Navajo Tribe established the first Navajo Tribal Museum in a small building on the Window Rock Tribal Fairgrounds. It was moved in 1982 to the back room of the Navajo Arts and Crafts Store. In 1997, a $7 million permanent home was built to store the Navajo artifacts in a museum specially built in a modern Navajo hogan style near the Navajo Nation Zoo.

The Navajo Nation Museum and its colocated Library offer many relics and artifacts of the Navajo people and Navajo Nation. Many resources on the Navajo people, language and ceremonies are also offered in the Navajo Nation Library which is adjacent to the museum. The museum is open Monday through Friday and is free to the public.

=== Navajo Nation Zoological and Botanical Park ===
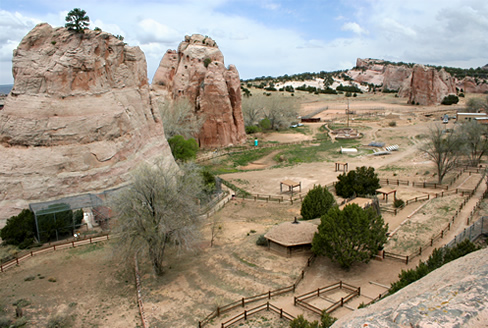
The Navajo Nation Zoological and Botanical Park

The Navajo Tribal Zoo opened in Window Rock in 1963 featuring reservation animals such as bear, coyotes, snake, elk, and the golden eagle. The Navajo Nation Zoological and Botanical Park offers a wide variety of plants, animals, fishes, birds and insects native to the Four Corners area of the Navajo Nation such as elk, mule deer, Mexican gray wolf, black bear, cougar, golden eagle, bighorn sheep, lynx, Rio Grande wild turkey, raccoon, Canada goose, and fox. The Navajo Nation Zoo is open Monday through Saturday and is free to the public.

== Infrastructure ==
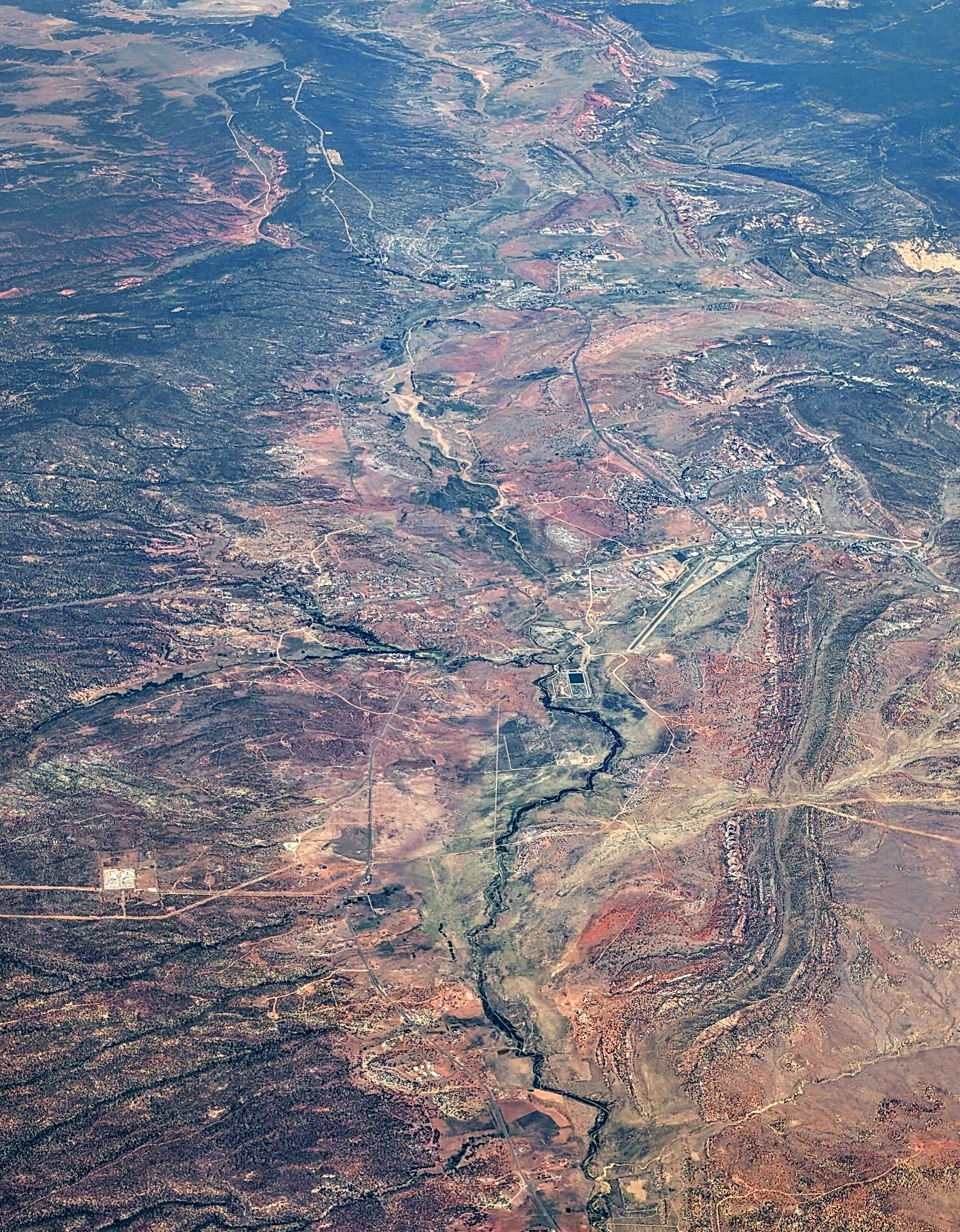
Aerial view from the south, with Window Rock Airport (right of center), Black Creek (lower center), and Tse Bonito, New Mexico (right edge center)

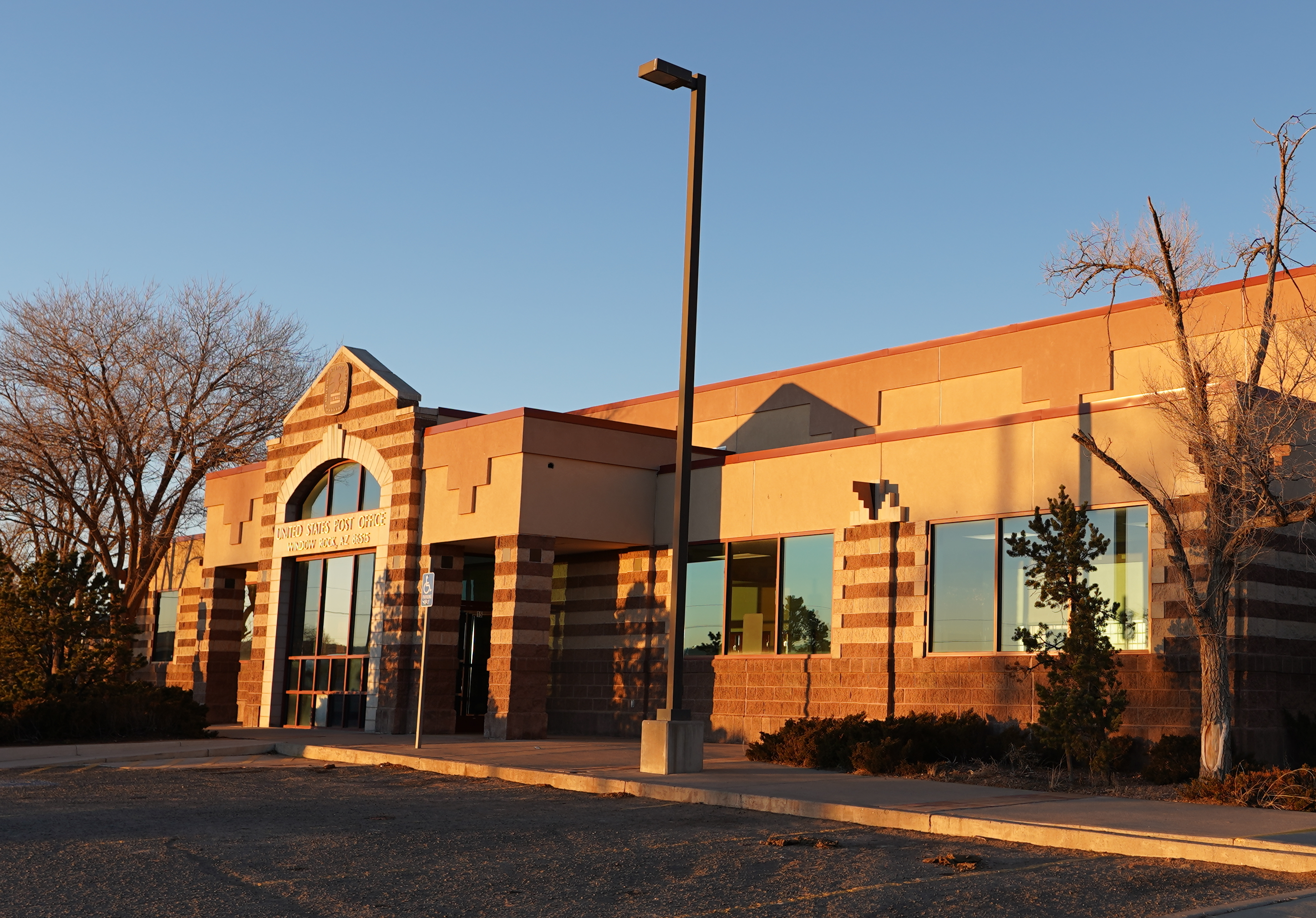
Window Rock post office

=== Transportation ===
Window Rock is served by Arizona State Route 264, and Indian Route 12.

Window Rock is served by a local regional airport : Window Rock Airport. Window Rock Airport is a public use airport located one nautical mile south of the central business district of Window Rock, in Apache County. It is owned by the Navajo Nation.

Local transportation is provided by the Navajo Transit System which operates from Window Rock. It provides several routes that serve the community, the Navajo Nation, the Hopi Nation, and San Juan Southern Paiute Tribe.

=== Business ===
Window Rock is served by two regional shopping centers: Diné Bashas' and Lowe's Market. The Navajo Nation Shopping Center Enterprise also serves the area. This includes local business, such as Navajo Arts And Crafts Enterprise, Caffeinated Ape, Dee Barber Shop, Shima Grill & Catering, Ch'ihootso Indian Market Place, Arizonian's Bookstore, Window Rock Coffee Company, Navajo United Way, IndigeHub, Navajo Technology Services, LLC, the DVD Collection, National Flowers, and New Mexico Chile Fair.

== Culture ==
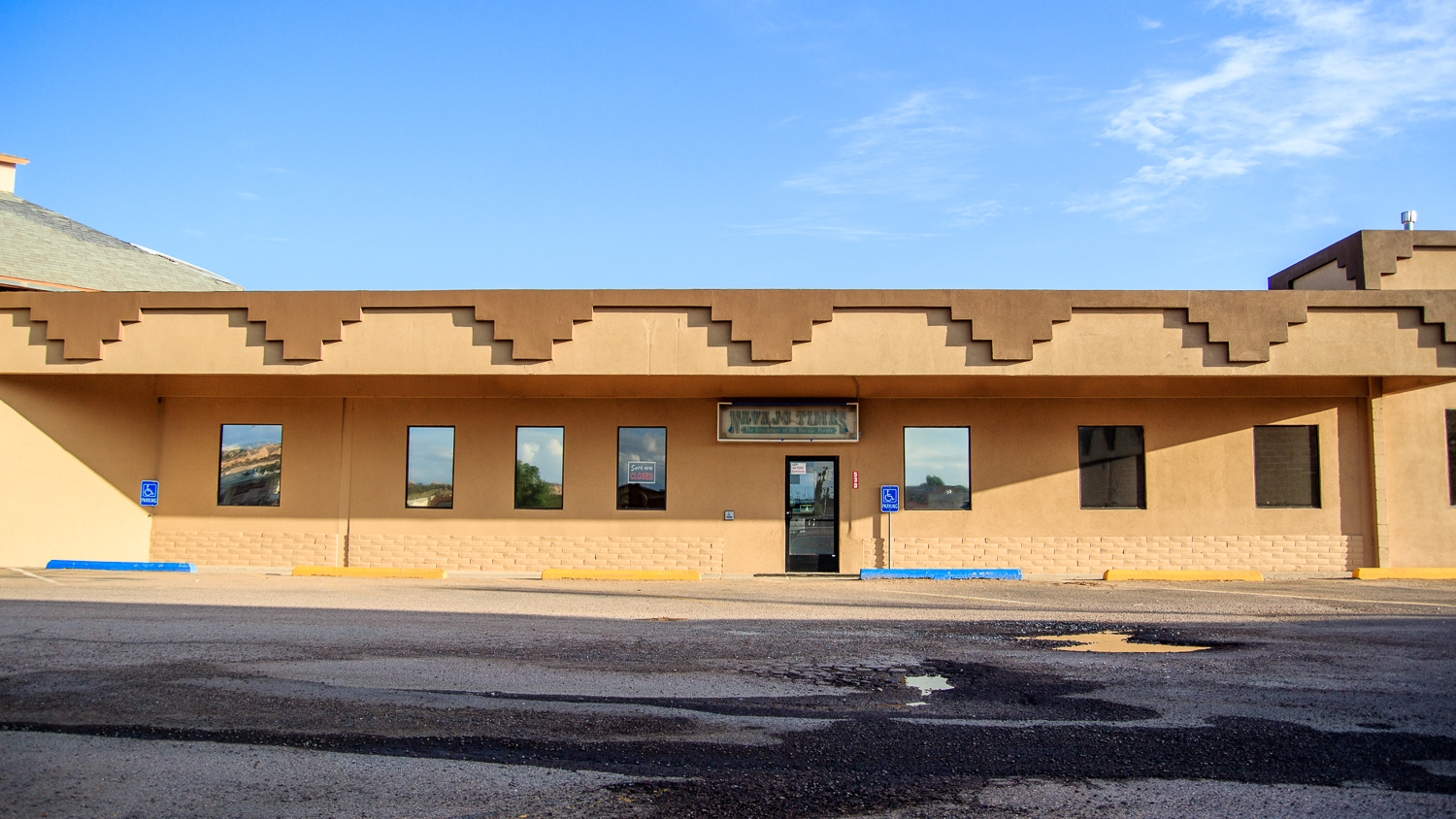
Navajo Times

Numerous events are hosted throughout the year in the greater Window Rock area, which includes Fort Defiance and St. Michaels, such as:

- Fourth of July Celebration & PRCA ProRodeo
- Navajo Nation Fair
- Navajo Nation Treaty Day Celebration
- Navajo Nation Prayer Day
- Megabucks Bull Riding

== Health care ==
Window Rock is served by the Tséhootsooí Medical Center. Located in Fort Defiance, Arizona it also serves the Window Rock and the surrounding area.

== Notable people ==
- William Y. Adams, American professor of anthropology
- Bobby Bold Eagle, professional wrestler
- Arthur Redcloud, Navajo actor
- Eugene Tapahe, Navajo photographer
- Ernest Tsosie, Navajo actor and comedian
- Peterson Zah, President of the Navajo Nation
