= Louva Dahozy =

Navajo human rights activist from Arizona (c. 1926–2026)

- Born: 1926 or 1927; Arizona, U.S.
- Died: January 20, 2026 (aged 99)
- Citizenship: Navajo Nation • American
- Education: Tuba City High School
- Occupation: Indigenous rights activist
- Employer(s): University of Arizona; Office of Navajo Economic Opportunities
- Spouse: Wilson Dahozy

Louva McCabe Dahozy (1926 or 1927 – January 20, 2026) was an American Navajo human rights activist. She was known as Nihe' Ma (lit. 'Our Mother') in recognition of her long-standing activism for the rights of Navajo people, as well as other Native American communities in United States.

== Biography ==
Dahozy was born near Flagstaff, Arizona, on the edge of the Navajo Nation during the 1920s. She was born of the Hashk’aa Hadzohi clan and for the Kinyaa’áanii clan. Dahozy grew up in a hogan, and graduated from Tuba City High School in Tuba City, Arizona in 1944.

After marrying Wilson Dahozy, she moved out of the Navajo Nation onto land in the Colorado River Indian Tribes Nation near Parker, Arizona. In 1958, she began working for the University of Arizona Cooperation Extension System as a community educator.

During the 1960s, Dahozy and her family returned to the Navajo Nation, settling in Fort Defiance. Dahozy began working for the Office of Navajo Economic Opportunities, and helped secure funding for Navajo language radio programmes focusing on healthy foods, nutrition, and home economics. For a decade, Dahozy recorded and produced daily episodes of Navajo Homemakers Radio Education, which was broadcast on eight Navajo community radio stations. Dahozy wrote several cookbooks, including Navajo Homemaker Cookbook (1969) and Navajo Terminology of Food and Nutrition (1977); she also wrote the first cookbook in Navajo. Dahozy was a guest lecturer in Navajo culture and indigenous cuisine at various universities, including the University of Arizona, Dartmouth College, Duke University, the University of Kansas, the University of New Mexico, Prescott College, and Diné College. She also served as cultural mentor for Miss Navajo Nation and as grand marshal of the 1996 Navajo Nation Fair.

In addition to her advocacy for the health and nutrition of Navajo people, Dahozy has also campaigned for voters' rights, including voter registration, as well as the needs of women and older people in indigenous communities. She was a founding member of the National Indian Council on Ageing, the Navajo Nation Council on Ageing, and the North American Indian Women's Association, of which she also acted as its first chairperson in 1970. Dahozy was also a delegate at the White House Conferences on Aging in 1971 and on Nutrition in 1973. Dahozy helped establish the Navajo Women and Infant Children Program.

Dahozy's work has been featured on television programs including Jamie Oliver's Food Revolution (2013) and World Central Kitchen (2020).

In 1994, Dahozy received a Lifetime Achievement Award from the Arizona College of Agriculture. In 2016, she was honored by the Apache County Recorder, Apache County Board of Supervisors and the 23rd Navajo Nation Council for outstanding service and contributions to the Navajo Nation. In 2022, Dahozy was given an Honorary Doctorate in Science from the University of Arizona's School of Nutritional Sciences and Wellness.

Seth Damon, the Speaker of the Navajo Nation Council, described Dahozy as "the mother of the Navajo people".

Dahozy died on January 20, 2026, at the age of 99. Speaker Crystalyne Curley called Dahozy "a champion of change".
