= Venida =

Venida is a given name. Notable people with the name include:

- Venida Chenault, American government official and academic administrator
- Venida Evans, American actress
