= Fort Defiance, Arizona =

CDP in Apache County, Arizona

Fort Defiance, Arizona Tséhootsooí (Navajo)
- Census-designated place
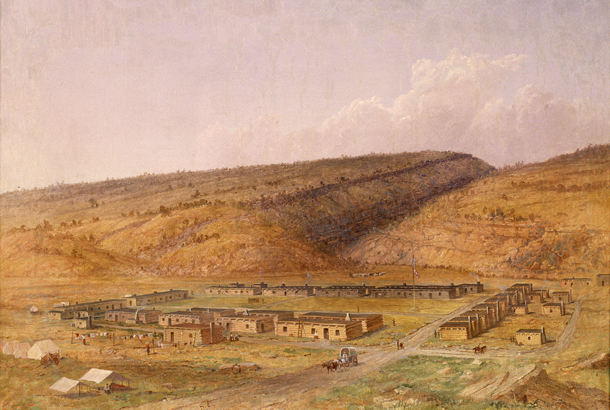
- Fort Defiance, New Mexico (now Arizona) by Seth Eastman (1808–1875), painted 1873

- Location in Apache County and the state of Arizona
- Coordinates: 35°44′51″N 109°04′07″W
- Country: United States
- State: Arizona
- County: Apache

Area
  - Total: 6.41 sq mi (16.60 km^{2})
  - Land: 6.41 sq mi (16.60 km^{2})
  - Water: 0 sq mi (0.00 km^{2})
- Elevation: 6,798 ft (2,072 m)

Population (2020)
  - Total: 3,541
  - Density: 552.6/sq mi (213.36/km^{2})
- Time zone: UTC-7 (MST)
  - Summer (DST): UTC-6 (MDT)
- ZIP code: 86504
- Area code: 928
- FIPS code: 04-24460
- GNIS feature ID: 2408236

Fort Defiance (Navajo: Tséhootsooí [tsʰéhòːtsʰòː.í]) is a census-designated place (CDP) in Apache County, Arizona, United States. It is also located within the Navajo Nation. The population was 3,624 at the 2010 census.

== History ==
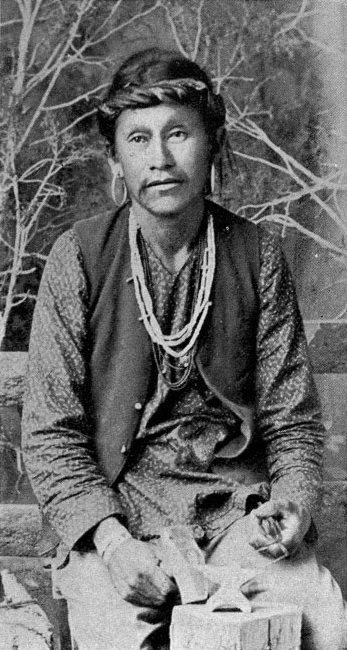
Navajo silversmith Náltsos Nigéhani, or Paper-carrier, also known as Jake, employed as a mail-carrier between Fort Wingate and Fort Defiance.

The land on which Fort Defiance was eventually established was first noted by the U.S. military when Colonel John Washington stopped there on his return journey from an expedition to Canyon de Chelly. Fort Defiance was established on September 18, 1851, by Col. Edwin V. Sumner to create a military presence in Diné bikéyah (Navajo territory). Sumner broke up the fort at Santa Fe for this purpose, creating the first military post in what is now Arizona. He left Major Electus Backus in charge.

Fort Defiance was built on valuable grazing land that the federal government then prohibited the Navajo from using. As a result, the appropriately named fort experienced intense fighting, culminating in two attacks: in 1856 and 1860. The next year, at the onset of the Civil War, the army abandoned Fort Defiance. Continued Navajo raids in the area led Brigadier General James H. Carleton to send Kit Carson to impose order. The fort was reestablished as Fort Canby in 1863 as a base for Carson's operations against the Navajo. General Carleton's "solution" was brutal: thousands of starving Navajo were forced on a Long Walk of 450 miles (720 km) and interned near Fort Sumner, New Mexico, and much of their livestock was destroyed. Following completion of this campaign in 1864 the fort was again abandoned and was burned by remaining Navajo, with only its walls remaining. The Navajo Treaty of 1868 allowed those interned to return to a portion of their land, and Fort Defiance was reestablished as an Indian agency that year. In 1870, the first government school for the Navajo was established there.

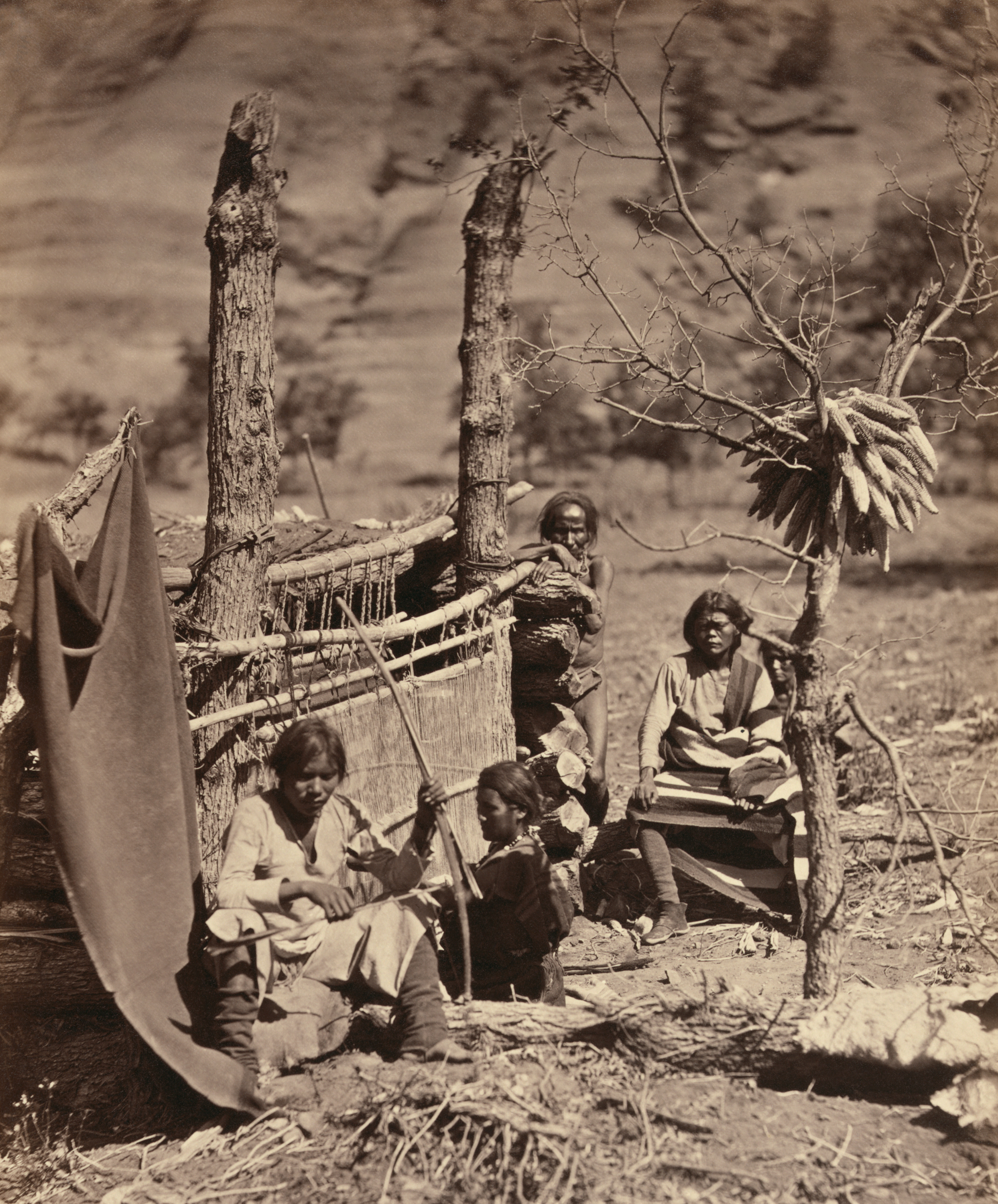
Navajo family with loom. Near Old Fort Defiance, New Mexico. Albumen print photograph, 1873.

Today, the site of Fort Defiance is populated by buildings dating from the 1930s to the present day used by various governmental agencies including the Bureau of Indian Affairs, Indian Health Service, and the Navajo Nation. The largest of these buildings was the Fort Defiance Indian Hospital until 2002.

== Geography ==
Fort Defiance is located on the Defiance Plateau approximately 4 miles (6 km) north of Window Rock.

According to the United States Census Bureau, the CDP has a total area of 6.1 square miles (15.8 km^{2}), all land.

== Demographics ==
Historical population
Census	Pop.	Note	%±
2000	4,061		—
2010	3,624		−10.8%
2020	3,541		−2.3%
U.S. Decennial Census

=== 2020 census ===
As of the 2020 census, Fort Defiance had a population of 3,541. The median age was 34.8 years. 27.7% of residents were under the age of 18 and 13.7% of residents were 65 years of age or older. For every 100 females there were 94.8 males, and for every 100 females age 18 and over there were 96.4 males age 18 and over.

0.0% of residents lived in urban areas, while 100.0% lived in rural areas.

There were 1,069 households in Fort Defiance, of which 44.5% had children under the age of 18 living in them. Of all households, 36.7% were married-couple households, 17.3% were households with a male householder and no spouse or partner present, and 36.3% were households with a female householder and no spouse or partner present. About 19.7% of all households were made up of individuals and 5.8% had someone living alone who was 65 years of age or older.

There were 1,144 housing units, of which 6.6% were vacant. The homeowner vacancy rate was 0.0% and the rental vacancy rate was 2.4%.

Racial composition as of the 2020 census
Race	Number	Percent
White	123	3.5%
Black or African American	15	0.4%
American Indian and Alaska Native	3,229	91.2%
Asian	50	1.4%
Native Hawaiian and Other Pacific Islander	0	0.0%
Some other race	27	0.8%
Two or more races	97	2.7%
Hispanic or Latino (of any race)	77	2.2%

=== 2000 census ===
Languages (2000)	Percent
Spoke Navajo at home	54.6%
Spoke English at home	45.4%

As of the 2000 census, there were 4,061 people, 1,115 households, and 890 families residing in the CDP. The population density was 669.3 inhabitants per square mile (258.4/km^{2}). There were 1,321 housing units at an average density of 217.7 per square mile (84.1/km^{2}). The racial makeup of the CDP was 92.9% Native American, 4.5% White, 0.3% Asian, 0.2% Black or African American, <0.1% Pacific Islander, 0.2% from other races, and 1.9% from two or more races. 1.4% of the population were Hispanic or Latino of any race.

There were 1,115 households, out of which 49.2% had children under the age of 18 living with them, 43.8% were married couples living together, 30.3% had a female householder with no husband present, and 20.1% were non-families. 18.2% of all households were made up of individuals, and 2.9% had someone living alone who was 65 years of age or older. The average household size was 3.61 and the average family size was 4.15.

In the CDP, the age distribution of the population shows 40.0% under the age of 18, 9.2% from 18 to 24, 27.1% from 25 to 44, 19.1% from 45 to 64, and 4.5% who were 65 years of age or older. The median age was 26 years. For every 100 females, there were 89.8 males. For every 100 females age 18 and over, there were 82.9 males.

The median income for a household in the CDP was $33,125, and the median income for a family was $35,448. Males had a median income of $35,455 versus $24,522 for females. The per capita income for the CDP was $10,716. About 27.9% of families and 29.5% of the population were below the poverty line, including 35.0% of those under age 18 and 32.5% of those age 65 or over.

== Education ==
Fort Defiance is a part of Window Rock Unified School District. Fort Defiance is served by Window Rock Elementary School, Tséhootsooí Middle School, and Window Rock High School.

The Navajo Nation operates Tséhootsooí Diné Bi'Ólta', a Navajo language immersion school for grades K–8 in Fort Defiance, Arizona. Located on the Arizona-New Mexico border in the southeastern quarter of the Navajo Reservation, the school strives to revitalize Navajo among children of the Window Rock Unified School District. Tséhootsooí Diné Bi'ólta' has thirteen Navajo language teachers who instruct only in the Navajo language, and no English, while five English language teachers instruct in the English language. Kindergarten and first grade are taught completely in the Navajo language, while English is incorporated into the program during third grade, when it is used for about 10% of instruction.

== Notable people ==
- Beulah Melvin Allen, former Miss Navajo Nation
- Ryneldi Becenti, first Native American player in the WNBA
- Herbert Blatchford, Native American activist and leader
- Evelyne Bradley, Navajo judge
- Raven Chacon, Navajo composer, musician, and artist
- Louva Dahozy, Navajo human rights activist
- Chee Dodge, Head Chief of the Navajo Tribe
- Michael McCabe, Navajo artist and teacher
- Jennifer Porter, tribal chair of the Kootenai Tribe of Idaho
- Anthony Seigler, Navajo professional baseball player
- Eugene Tapahe, Navajo photographer
- Frank Tsosie Thompson, Navajo code talker
- Ernest Tsosie, Navajo actor and comedian
- Annie Dodge Wauneka, member of the Navajo Nation Council
