= Michael McCabe (artist) =

Navajo artist and master printmaker (1961–2023)

- Born: Michael Duane McCabe; February 8, 1961; Navajo Nation, Fort Defiance (Navajo: Tséhootsooí [tsʰéhòːtsʰòː.í]), Arizona
- Died: April 3, 2023 (aged 62)
- Citizenship: Navajo Nation and American
- Education: Institute of American Indian Arts
- Known for: printmaking

Michael Duane McCabe (1961–2023) was a Diné (Navajo) monotype artist, master printmaker and teacher. His work is found in the permanent collection of the Portland Art Museum and many of his works are held in the IAIA Museum of Contemporary Native Arts.

== Early life and education ==
McCabe was born February 8, 1961, on the Navajo Nation in Fort Defiance, Arizona (Navajo: Tséhootsooí [tsʰéhòːtsʰòː.í]), to Helen Natonabah and Peter McCabe. The Santa Fe Reporter states that "He was born into the Táchii'nii clan (Red Running into the Water People Clan) and was born for Hashk'aa Hadzohi (Yucca-Fruit-Strung-Out-In-A-Line Clan)." Part of his childhood was spent in Las Vegas, Nevada before moving to Santa Fe, New Mexico in 1973. He attended high school in Santa Fe, and went on to attend the Institute of American Indian Arts with an emphasis in printmaking as well as ceramic arts and creative writing. After graduating from IAIA, he attended Naropa Institute where he studied Poetics and Spiritual Practices in conjunction with the One World Poetry Conference. Some of his teachers included Allen Ginsberg, Diane Di Prima and Gregory Corso.

== Career ==
McCabe first became acquainted with printmaking processes by Craig Locklear. Shortly thereafter he began teaching at the Santa Fe Community College, the Institute for American Indian Arts, and in several private studios including Spotted Dog Press and Hand Graphics. He also taught at the California Correctional Center in Susanville.

McCabe was well known among artists throughout the world as a master printer. Artists came from as far as South America to create prints under his guidance. Between 2003 and 2023 he was a partner in Fourth Dimension Press in Santa Fe where he used a 30”x60” intaglio press. For a time he worked in a studio on the Pojoaque Pueblo while living in Cuyamunge, New Mexico.

Untitled multi-color monoprint with Chine-collé, by McCabe, 12"x24", 2013

He worked in the monoprint genre for nearly forty years, focusing on viscosity printing with multiple colors. Some of the artists he printed for included Hock E Aye Vi Edgar Heap of Birds, Jaune Quick-to-See Smith and Forrest Moses.

His monoprints were usually one-of-a-kind, and that were printed on smoothly surfaced, non-absorbent paper, and often included collage or Chine-collé techniques. His style has been described as "expressive". Trend Magazine stated that he "pushed the technique into ever-changing combinations of inks, materials, and methods." Some of his prints include photographs to create "layered collaged works" that included such imagery as ravens, Asian calligraphy, a photograph of his nomadic great-grandfather, and vintage hand-written letters from the 19th century.

== Collections ==
Many of McCabe's works are held in the permanent collection of the IAIA Museum of Contemporary Native Arts. His work is also held in the Portland Art Museum and the University of Arizona Museum of Art.

== Death ==
McCabe had debilitating arthritis. He died at age 62 on April 3, 2023, after an extended struggle with health problems.
