= Sandra C. Fernández =

Ecuadorian-American illustrator

Sandra Cecilia Fernández (born 1964) is an Ecuadorian-American artist living in Texas. Her practice includes—separately and in combination—printmaking, photography, artist's books, soft sculpture, fiber art, assemblage, and installations; using a variety of materials, such as paper, thread, metal, wood, organic materials, and small found objects. Fernandez's work is rooted in the transborder experiences of exile, dislocation, relocation, memory, and self-conscious identity-construction/reconstruction.

== Early life and education ==
Fernández was born in Queens, New York in 1964. Daughter of Ecuadorian parents who migrated to the United States in the early 60's as young adults. Before turning one year old, she moved with her mother to Quito. At age three, she began traveling to the United States to spend some summers with her father. She spent the majority of her early years in Ecuador in a rich cultural environment of writers, artists and artisans. She learned to love the arts and acquired skills in photography and traditional processes such as embroidery, weaving, and knitting.

As a college student she studied Sociology and Literature at the Pontificia Universidad Católica del Ecuador while helping her grandfather Leonardo J. Muñoz, a well known ecuadorian bookseller. His collection of books from the 16th to the 20th century instilled in her an interest in paper and printed text. She returned to live in the United States in 1987, fleeing the violence of the León Febres Cordero presidency, which persecuted young people through "arbitrary detentions, extrajudicial executions, torture, sexual violence, and forced disappearances"

Fernández began studies in graphic design at the Madison Area Technical College in Wisconsin and received an Associate in Applied Arts degree. She continued at the University of Wisconsin at Madison, receiving first a bachelor's degree in arts, to later graduate with a Master of Arts and a Master of Fine Arts degrees in photography, printmaking and book arts, from the University of Wisconsin at Madison. She studied intaglio printmaking techniques at Taller Tres en Raya in Madrid, Spain.

She was invited as an artist in residence at Sam Coronado's Serie Project (Austin TX) in 2005 & 2013, to Self Help Graphics (Los Angeles CA) in 2017, to Taller Arte del Nuevo Amanecer TANA (Woodland, CA) in where the artists regularly discussed political issues related to Latinx life in the United States, particularly the impact of free trade agreements on the U.S./Mexico border and its residents.

== Career ==
Sandra C. Fernández works primarily in printmaking into which she synthesizes serigraphy, intaglio, relief printing, chine-collé, photography, and sewing, which she uses as a drawing tool. She also makes installations, public art, artist's books and assemblages. Her work reflects the issues that have affected her or that relate to her experience as a woman and a migrant, expressed through the use of specific symbols and processes. Some of these issues include sexism, political freedom, and the isolation or dislocation of the migrant. She often incorporates text, in both English and Spanish, to highlight the "dual spaces" she inhabits. Her work has often been critical of United States intervention in Latin America, reflecting her experience of living in Ecuador as well as her work as a teacher along the United States/Mexico border.

As early as the 1990s, Fernández began producing thematic series of works. Her first collection of artist's books as containers reflect various aspects of her cultural background and upbringing. The Paper Doll (Cucas) series are mixed media pieces that use the symbol of a skirt to address women's issues. The Border series emphasizes migration and the plight of DREAMers. young people who entered the United States as minors and who are granted temporary residency through the DREAM Act.

Fernández has been on the faculty at several universities in the United States including Hunter College, Monmouth University, The University of Texas at Austin, The State University of New York at Buffalo, Illinois State University, and Illinois Wesleyan University. Her courses have included printmaking, artist's books, drawing, 2 & 3D foundations, photography, and art appreciation.

Fernández is a past director of the Guest Artist in Print Program (GAAP) at the University of Austin in Texas, the Printmaking Center of New Jersey. She is currently the director of the Consejo Gráfico Nacional, an independent coalition of printmaking workshops dedicated to the advancement and promotion of Latino printmakers through exhibitions and collaborative projects. She is also de owner and director of Sfernandez Art (Press & Taller).

=== Exhibitions ===
Sandra C. Fernández has had work exhibited in numerous group shows and solo exhibitions throughout the United States, Canada, Mexico, Perú, Ecuador, Argentina, Canada, Italy, Spain, Palestine, Qatar, United Arab Emirates, Japan and Indonesia. Her work was recently included in ¡Printing the Revolution! The Rise and Impact of Chicano Graphics, 1965 to Now, where for the first time, historical civil rights-era prints by Chicano artists are exhibited alongside works by graphic artists working from the 1980s to today.

== Selected Public collections ==
- Smithsonian American Art Museum
- The National Museum of Women in the Arts, Washington DC.
- The Metropolitan Museum of Art (MET), Artist's Book Collection T. Watson Library. New York, NY.
- Museum of Modern Art (MOMA), Franklin Furnace Archive
- The Library of Congress, Washington D.C.
- Bibliothèque Nationale de France, Paris
- Mexic-Arte Museum, Austin, Texas
- San Antonio Museum of Art, San Antonio, Texas
- Bainbridge Island Museum of Art, Cynthia Sears Collection. Bainbridge Island, WA
- Nettie Lee Benson Latin American Collection, University of Texas at Austin
- Amon Carter Brown Museum of American Art, Fort Worth, TX.
- Hood Museum of Art, Dartmouth College, Hanover, NH.
- Moody Library Special Collections Book Arts, Baylor University, Waco, TX.
- Contemporary Women Artists Files, Rutgers University Libraries
- Kohler Art Library Artist’s Books Collection, Madison, WI
