= Sunny Dooley =

Diné storyteller

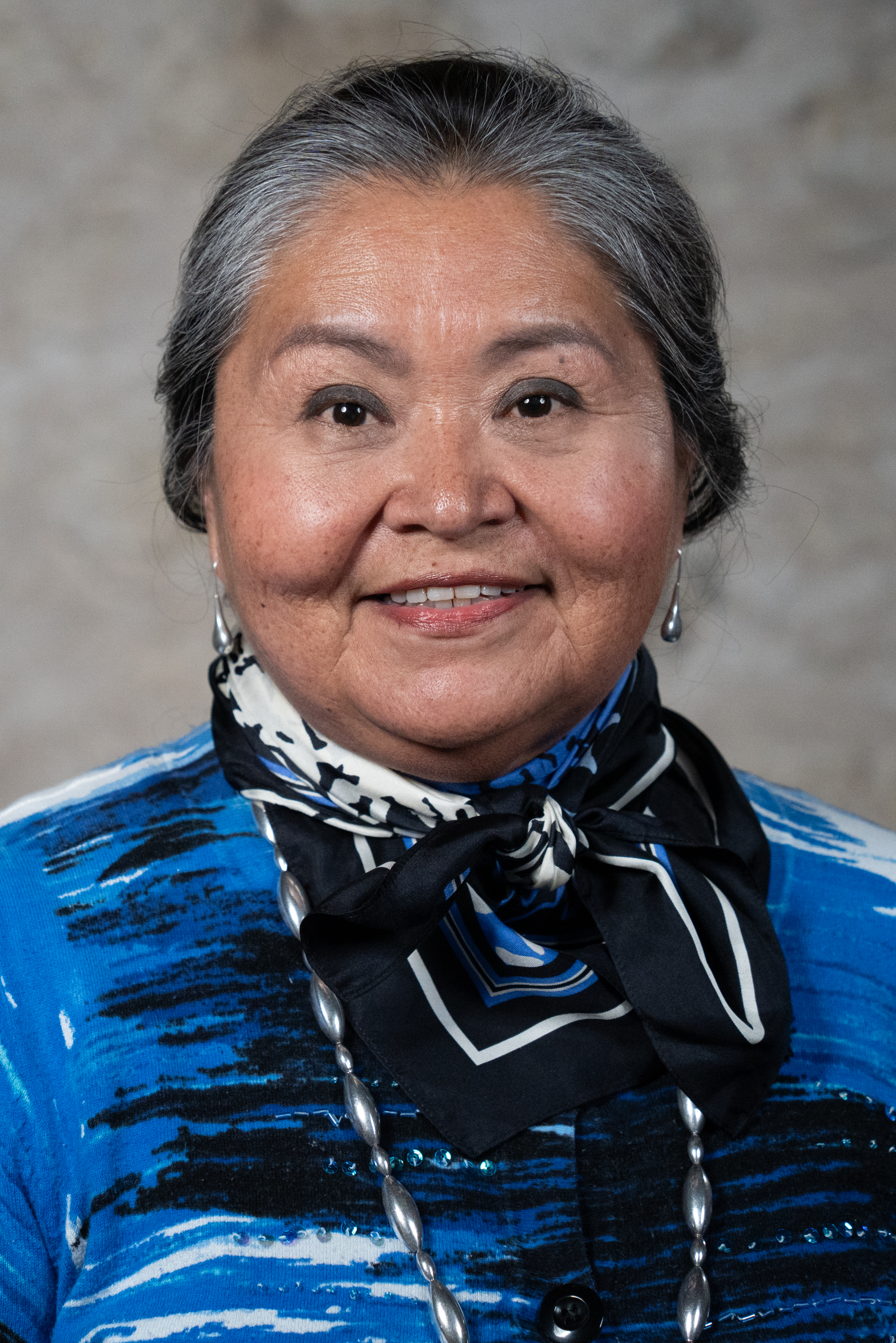
Dooley at SXSW 2025

Sunny Dooley is a Diné storyteller born into the Saltwater Clan and born from the Water's Edge Clan. She shares Hane', or Diné Blessingway stories, and is a former Miss Navajo Nation, having won the title in 1982.

== Biography ==
Dooley was born to parents Dorothy and Tom Dooley. She is from the Chi Chil' Tah (Where the Oaks Grow) community in New Mexico, and grew up on the Navajo reservation in Arizona. She learned to speak Diné Bizaad as her first language and learned the skill of storytelling from her mother. As a storyteller, Dooley shares stories that have been passed down through generations in her family.

In 1979, Dooley graduated from West High School in Salt Lake City, Utah. She attended the University of New Mexico, where she received an Associate of Art degree. She later graduated from Brigham Young University, majoring in speech communications and minoring in art. While at the school, she was awarded Miss Indian Brigham Young University.

In 1982, she competed in Miss Navajo Nation. During the competition's skills portion, she told a story about the Changing Woman. She won the competition, becoming Miss Navajo Nation from 1982 to 1983. After the contest, she continued storytelling. She performed at the National Museum of the American Indian in Washington, D.C. around 2009. A year later, she published a story called "Mai and the Cliff-Dwelling Birds" in the 2010 book, Trickster: Native American Tales.

As of 2021, Dooley lives in Chi Chil' Tah in a hogan, a traditional log house.

In 2023, she had an acting appearance in the film Frybread Face and Me. In 2024, she served as a cultural advisor and one of the central narrative figures in Johannes Grenzfurther's documentary Hacking at Leaves. An interview with Kayla Briët is included in the 2025 documentary, Ways of Knowing.
