= Haskell Indian Nations University =

Public university in Lawrence, Kansas, U.S.

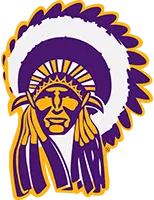
- Former names: United States Indian Industrial Training School (1884–1887); Haskell Institute (1887–1970); Haskell Indian Junior College (1970–1993)
- Type: Public tribal land-grant university
- Established: 1884; 142 years ago
- Academic affiliations: AIHEC, Space-grant
- Students: 878 (all undergraduate) (fall 2024)
- Location: Lawrence, Kansas, U.S.
- Colors: Purple, gold and white
- Nickname: Fighting Indians
- Sporting affiliations: NAIA – Continental
- Website: haskell.edu
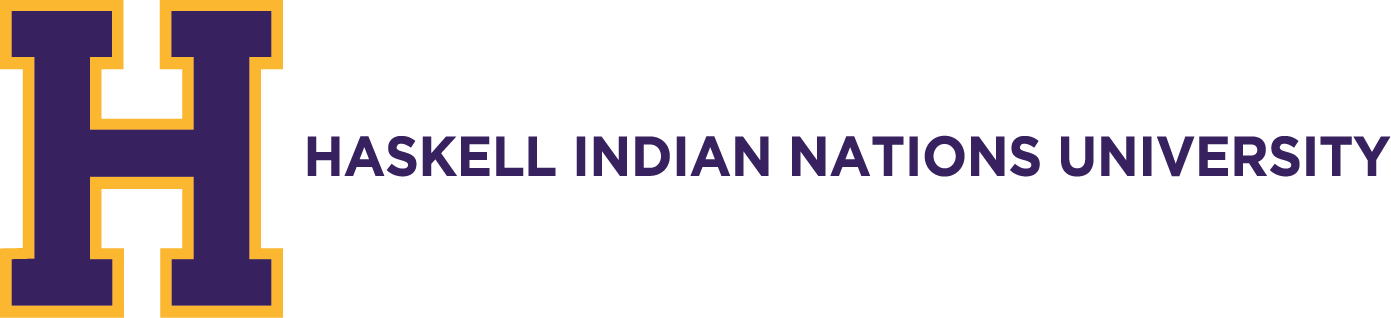

Haskell Indian Nations University (Haskell or HINU) is a public tribal land-grant university in Lawrence, Kansas, United States. Founded in 1884 as a residential boarding school for Native American children, the school has developed into a university operated by the U.S. Bureau of Indian Affairs that offers both associate and baccalaureate degrees. The college was founded to serve members of federally recognized Native American tribes in the United States. It is the oldest continually operating federal school for American Indians.

Approximately 140 Tribal nations and Alaska Native communities are represented at Haskell, which is funded directly by the Bureau of Indian Education as a U.S. Trust Responsibility to Native American Tribes. While the school does not charge tuition, students are responsible for paying yearly fees.

Twelve campus buildings have been designated as U.S. National Historic Landmarks. Haskell is home to the Haskell Cultural Center and Museum, the American Indian Athletic Hall of Fame, the Indian Leader, the oldest Native American student newspaper in the country; and numerous student clubs and organizations. Faculty and students built the Haskell Medicine Wheel Earthwork in 1992, and the Haskell-Baker Wetlands are important for migrating birds. The renowned Rinehart Collection is housed in the Haskell Cultural Center. Numerous sculptures and murals are located throughout the campus. Haskell also is a member of the American Council on Education, the Council for Higher Education Accreditation, the Higher Learning Commission, and the National Association of Intercollegiate Athletics.

The university hosts cultural and academic events that attract visitors (both Native American and non-Native) from across the country and abroad. Such events include the annual Haskell Indian Art Market, the Stories-n-Motion Film Festival, and the Haskell Commencement and Pow-Wow. These public events are held along with numerous educational conferences, workshops, and presentations.

== History ==
The history of Haskell Indian Nations University reflects both U.S. Indian policy and self-determination efforts by American Indian and Alaska Native communities. Haskell was founded during an era following the Indian Wars when the federal government believed that Native Americans needed to assimilate into the majority culture in order to survive. The US government had earlier provided some schools on reservations according to treaties, which were usually administered by religious missions. In the late 19th century, it also began to establish off-reservation boarding schools. Native American children were recruited from a variety of tribes to attend for their education, and were expected to abandon their tribal traditions while there. The Carlisle Indian Industrial School, founded in 1879 in Pennsylvania, became the model for federal immersion programs in education. In 1882 the United States Congress authorized three new boarding schools to be established in Nebraska, Kansas, and Indian Territory (a plan that would cost $150,000), and the Carlisle school was the model for these soon-to-be-constructed institutions, including what became Haskell in Kansas.

When Haskell opened in 1884, it was called "United States Indian Industrial Training School". It had 22 elementary school-age students the first year. Soon boys were taught skills in tailoring, wagon making, blacksmithing, harness making, painting, shoe making, and farming, reflecting trades common to their mostly rural and small town environments of reservations. Girls studied cooking, sewing and homemaking. As was typical of many such rural schools, most of the students' food was produced on the associated Haskell farm. Older students were expected to work while at the school, as in the model of Tuskegee Institute and similar independent institutions.

According to many sources, school living conditions during the 1880s and 1890s were harsh. Organized under the semi-military system of the Carlisle Indian School, students wore uniforms to enforce conformity and end tribal identification. Their hair was cut when they entered school, which was especially painful for the boys, as in most tribes, adult men kept long hair. The children marched to classes and exercised regularly. Students were often physically punished if they failed to follow the rules of the institute. At least 103 children died while attending the school.

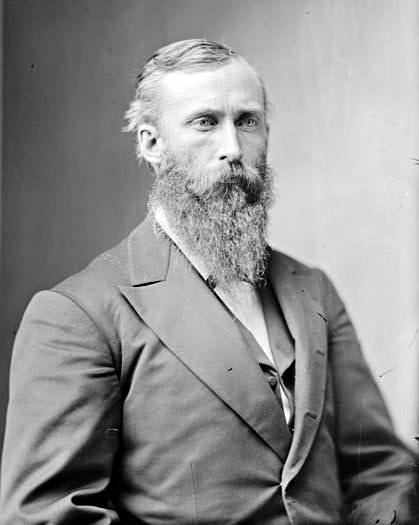
The school was named after Dudley C. Haskell, a member of the U.S. House of Representatives from the 2nd district of Kansas.

In 1887, the school was renamed "Haskell Institute" in honor of Dudley Haskell, the U.S. representative from Kansas's 2nd district who achieved having the school built in Lawrence.

In 1889, Charles T. Meserve was appointed as the fifth superintendent in Haskell's five-year history. His discharge of many employees (including the principal teacher) brought criticism from the president of the National Education Association. Students reacted to his harsh treatment by sending four protesting petitions to the BIA in Washington, DC. A Special Indian Agent, appointed to investigate the incident, whitewashed the whole situation.

In the early 20th century, Haskell continued to evolve while operated by the federal government. It added classes for upper grades, and in 1927 received accreditation as a Kansas high school. By 1935 it was classified as a vocational-technical school.

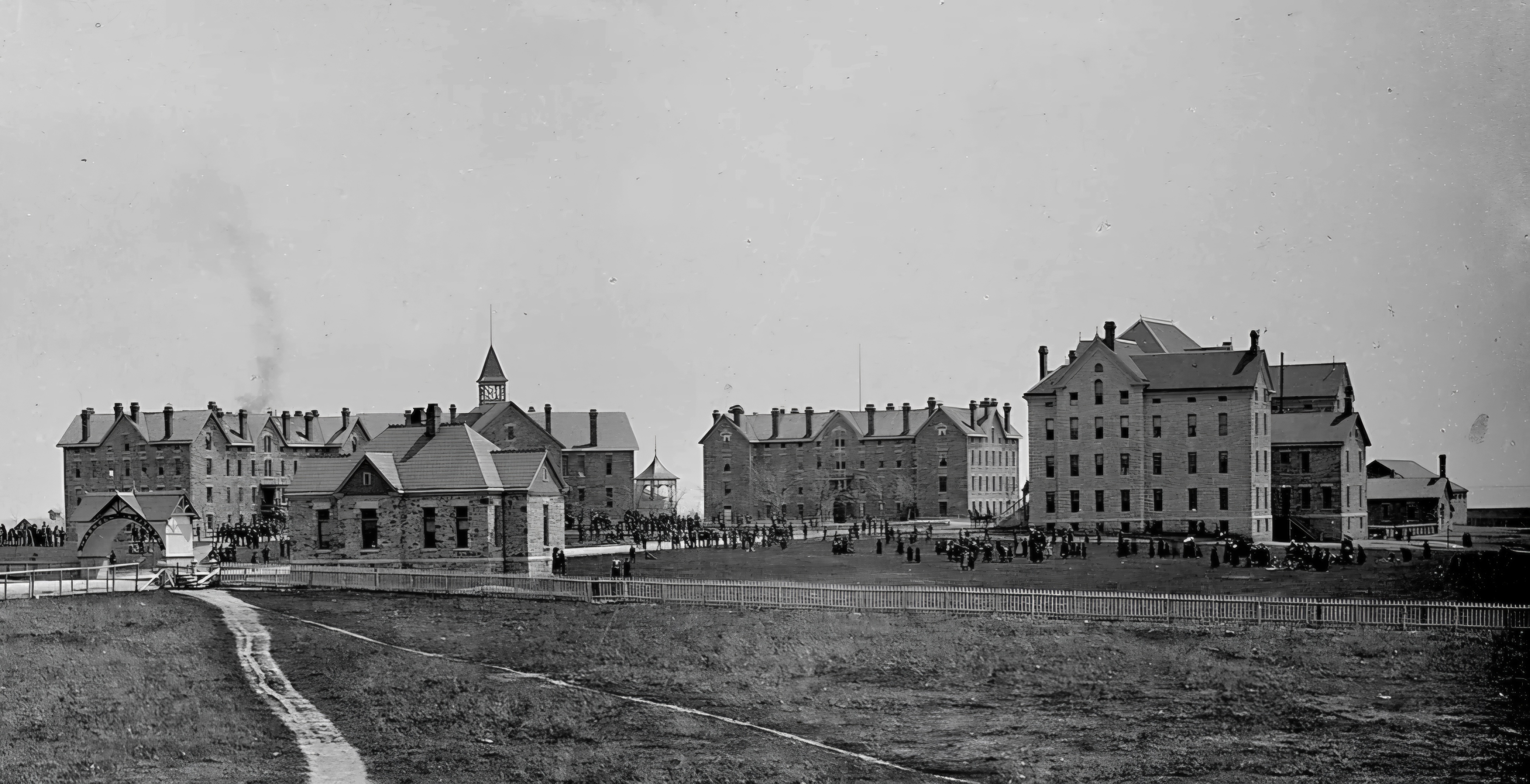
Haskell campus circa 1900

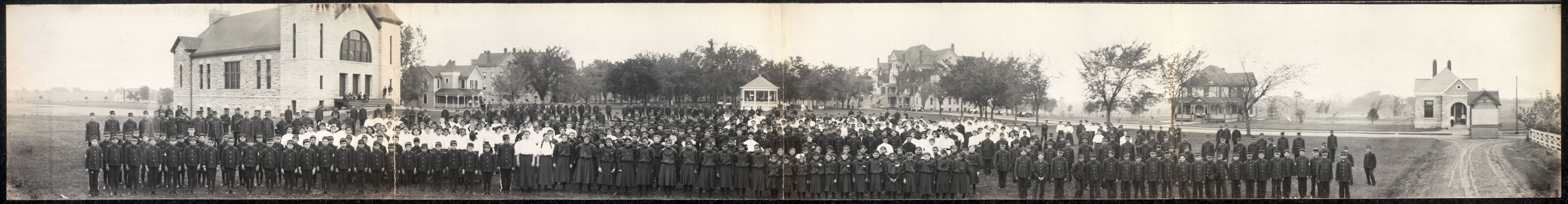
Students at Haskell Institute, 1908. Hiawatha Hall, the oldest building still on campus, can be seen in the background on the far left.

From the 1900s through the 1930s, Haskell became famous for its football teams. In competition with teams from colleges such as Harvard, Yale, and Brown, Haskell was known as the "Powerhouse of the West". From 1902 to 1919, Haskell won five of eleven games played against the University of Texas.

During the 1960s, Native Americans organized to assert their cultures and work to realign the relationships between federally recognized tribes and the federal government. Among the areas they wanted to change was education of their children. They wanted more from the schools. They were encouraged by the civil rights movement of African Americans to press for fulfillment of treaty conditions. At Haskell, students and activists wanted to reconfigure the school's pedagogical approach to better serve Indian country and Alaska Native communities. In 1965, Haskell graduated its last high school class.

Two years later, with more curriculum development, the school in 1967 was renamed as "Haskell Indian Junior College", able to award associate degrees and certificates in special skills programs. Wallace Galluzzi (1926–1984) was president of Haskell Indian Junior College (later Haskell Indian Nations University, previously Haskell Institute) in Lawrence, Kansas, from 1969 to 1981. By the late 1980s, planning began to develop the institution as a four-year, bachelor-degree granting university.

In 1993, the Assistant Secretary for Indian Affairs, Ada Deer, approved that development, which had been built on expansion of the curricula and programs. It was renamed Haskell Indian Nations University. Haskell offered its first four-year baccalaureate degree program in elementary teacher education. Within a few years, Haskell had developed its own, specialized bachelor's degree program in American Indian Studies; Business Administration and Environmental Sciences degree programs soon followed.

In 1994, Congress designated this college and 31 other tribal colleges as land-grant colleges, to provide them with benefits of related programs.

At the turn of the 21st century, Haskell had become a tribal-based university with a curriculum serving general Native American and Alaska Native goals. In 2013 it had about 1,000 students. Today, Haskell's alumni work in numerous areas to serve Indian country and Alaska Native communities.

The university faced national scrutiny in 2024 after a Bureau of Indian Education report revealed that university officials routinely failed to report or adequately respond to sexual harassment and assault complaints. The investigation found that students' reports of sexual abuse were often ignored, and in some cases, survivors were denied support or faced retaliation, including expulsion following academic struggles related to their experiences. The BIE report also documented that accused individuals were sometimes allowed to remain on campus and that staff accused of misconduct were reassigned rather than disciplined. These findings led to a congressional hearing, where lawmakers criticized the university's culture of neglect and the BIE's inadequate oversight, prompting calls for policy reforms and improved campus safety measures.

On February 14, 2025, in the middle of the school year, Haskell was forced to lay off a quarter of its staff due to budget cuts by the Trump administration.

== Campus ==
- Haskell Institute
- U.S. National Register of Historic Places
- U.S. National Historic Landmark District
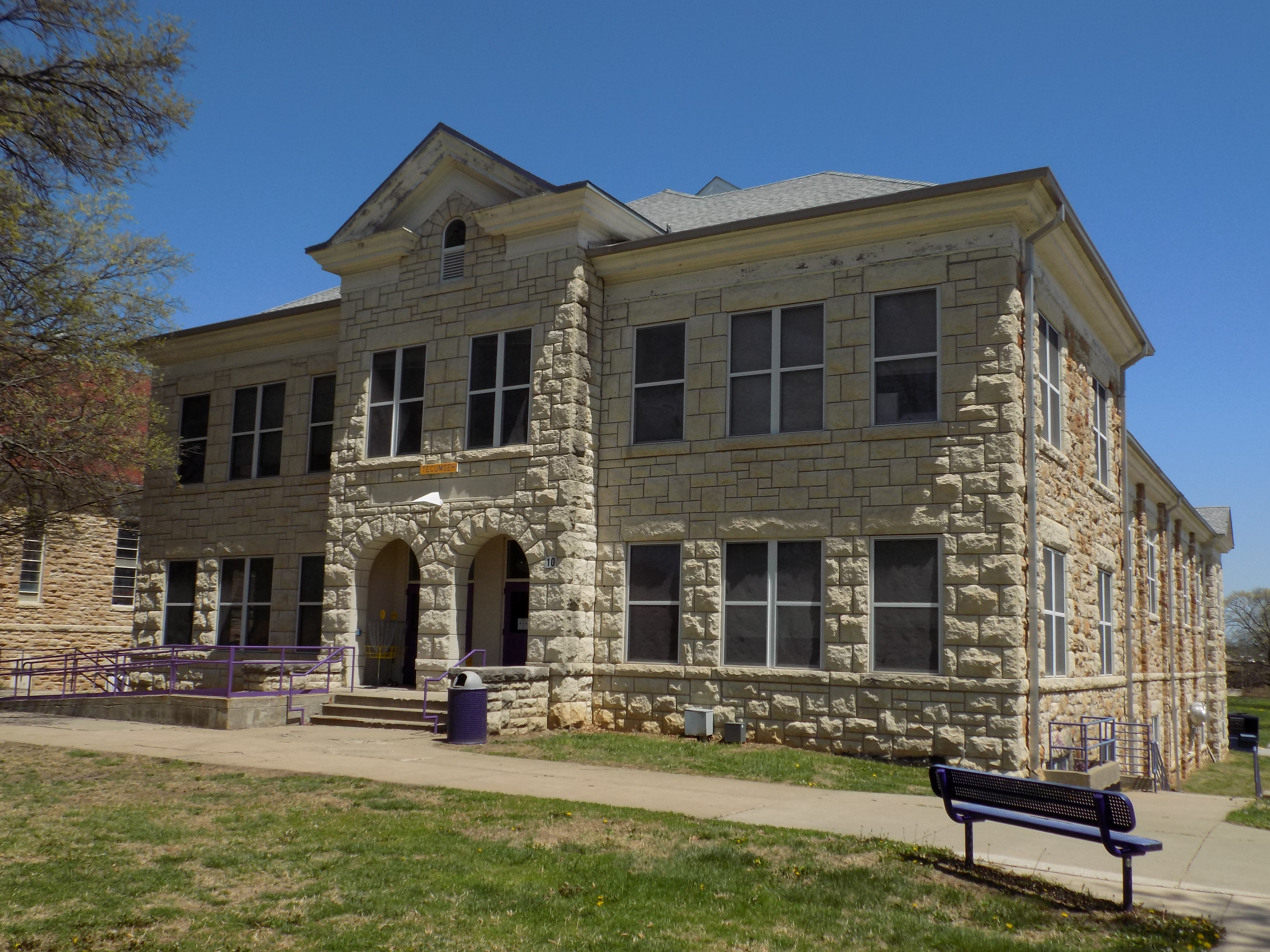
- Haskell's Tecumseh Hall (2018)

- Location within Kansas Location within the United States
- Location: Lawrence, Kansas
- Coordinates: 38°56′23″N 95°13′58″W
- NRHP reference No.: 66000342

Significant dates
- Added to NRHP: October 15, 1966
- Designated NHLD: July 4, 1961

The Haskell campus has 12 buildings that have been designated as U.S. National Historic Landmarks. In addition to its historic architecture, Haskell is recognized for its collection of public sculptures, murals, photographs, and paintings. Examples include the well-known sculpture, Comrade in Mourning, by Allan Houser.

The Haskell-Baker Wetlands span approximately 640 acres (260 ha) on the south side of the Haskell campus. These wetlands are home to 243 species of birds, 21 species of fish, 22 species of reptiles, and 26 species of plants. This area serves as a feeding and breeding ground for the migratory birds that breed in Canada and migrate to Mexico and South America. The Northern Crawfish Frog is an endangered species and its critical habitat is the wetlands.

=== Blalock Hall ===
Constructed in 1978, Blalock Hall was named in honor of Margaret Blalock, Chippewa, a Haskell alumna, and long-time employee at the college, who was committed to serving the students at Haskell. It is a residential hall for freshman (first year) men and male students transferring from other colleges and universities.

=== Hiawatha Hall ===
Originally constructed in 1898 and dedicated on March 12, 1899, Hiawatha Hall was named after the historic Onondaga leader of the same name. The hall was built by the United Methodist Church to serve as a campus chapel (although it has also served as a general auditorium and as a girl's gym at various times in the school's history), and today it is the oldest building still standing on the Haskell campus. Hiawatha Hall is currently owned by the federal government and has been closed for decades because the government has not allocated money to pay for necessary repairs—despite the building being on the National Historic Landmarks list.

=== Osceola and Keokuk Halls ===
Osceola and Keokuk Halls are collectively known as O-K Hall. Constructed in 1884, Osceola and Keokuk served as dormitories for men and women, respectively. Osceola was a famous Seminole warrior, whose name means "Rising Sun". Keokuk, a Sac and Fox whose name means "Watchful Fox", was not a hereditary chief, but recognized for his skillful leadership, force of character, and brilliant oratory. O-K Hall is currently a residential hall for both women and men.

=== Pocahontas Hall ===
Pocahontas Hall was built in 1931 and was named after the daughter of Powhatan, Mamanatowick of the Powhatan Confederacy. She married English colonist John Rolfe, and they were ancestors to many descendants of First Families of Virginia. It serves as a residential hall for freshman women and female students transferring from other colleges and universities.

=== Pontiac Hall ===
Built in 1934, Pontiac Hall was named after an Ottawa chief. It is located immediately south of the main quadrangle.

=== Powhatan Hall ===
Powhatan Hall was constructed in 1932 and named after the Mamanatowick of the Powhatan Confederacy, made up of 30 Algonquian-speaking tribes in coastal Virginia. Originally used for classrooms, it has been adapted as a residential hall, housing Student Residential Assistants (SRS).

=== Roe Cloud Hall ===
Completed in 1997, Roe Cloud Hall was named after Henry Roe Cloud, a member of the Winnebago Nation who was the first American Indian superintendent of the Haskell Institute, serving from 1933 to 1935. During his tenure, then "Haskell Institute" began demilitarizing the school and Roe Cloud helped to change the US policy of assimilation towards native peoples. Roe Cloud later served in the presidential administrations of Herbert Hoover and Franklin Delano Roosevelt. He was a spokesman for American Indian issues and education throughout his life. It is a residential hall for both men and women.

=== Sequoyah Hall ===
Sequoyah Hall was built in 1961 and named for Sequoyah, the Cherokee who developed a syllabary writing system for the Cherokee language in the early 19th century; this was the first known independent development of a writing system. It lies on the eastern edge of the main quadrangle area.

=== Tecumseh Hall ===
Built in 1915 as a gymnasium, Tecumseh Hall was named after the Shawnee chief who led an effort to repulse the European-American settlers from Indian territory west of the Appalachian Mountains. It houses the Campus Shoppe, offices of the Student Senate, Student Activities, and the Indian Leader (the campus newspaper).

=== Winona Hall ===
Originally constructed in 1897, Winona Hall was rebuilt in 1962. The name Winona in Lakota tradition is for daughters who are the first-born child of the family. Winona Hall currently is a co-ed honors residential hall, serving both women and men.

Haskell campus buildings

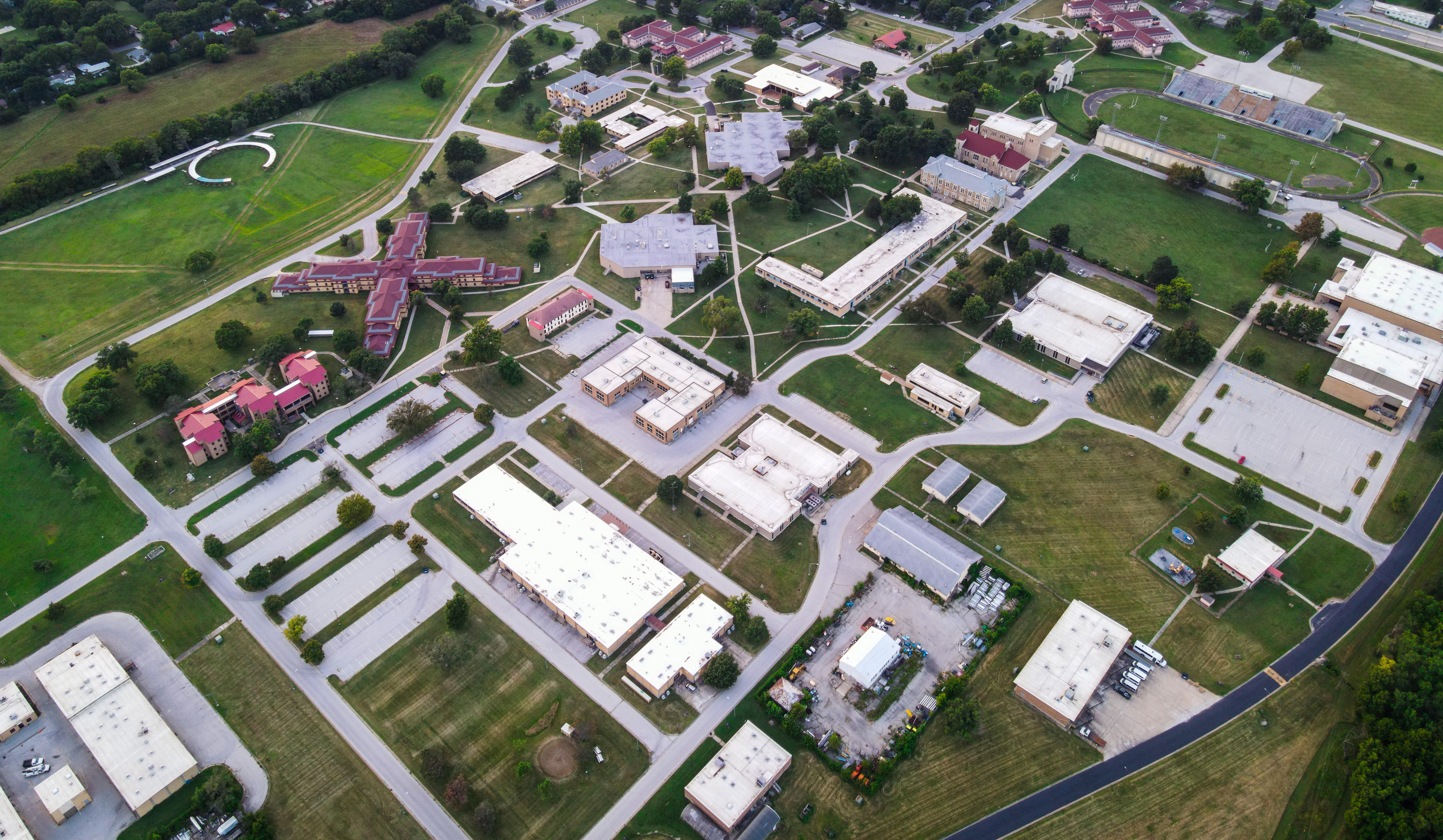
Aerial view of Haskell campus

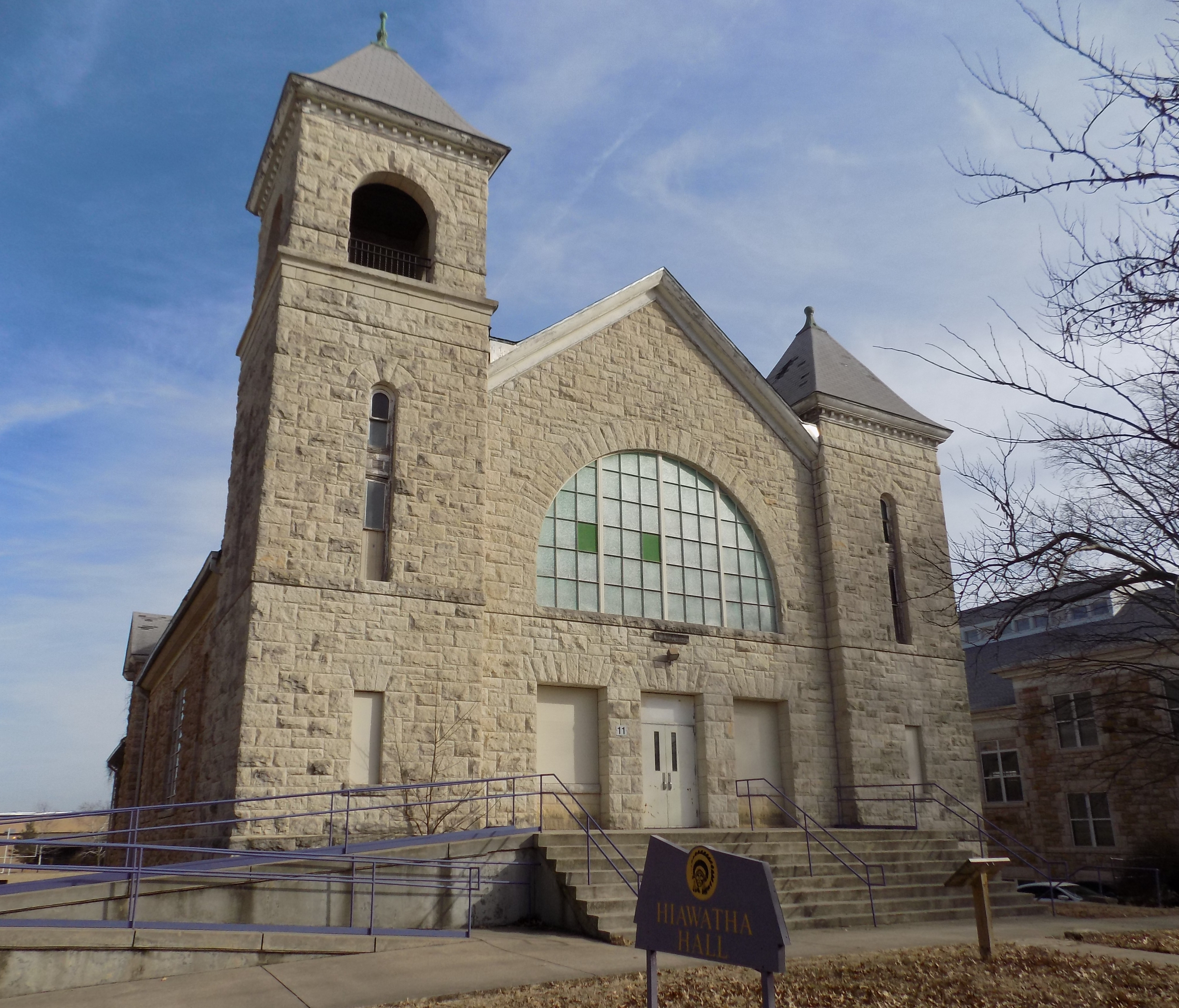
Hiawatha Hall

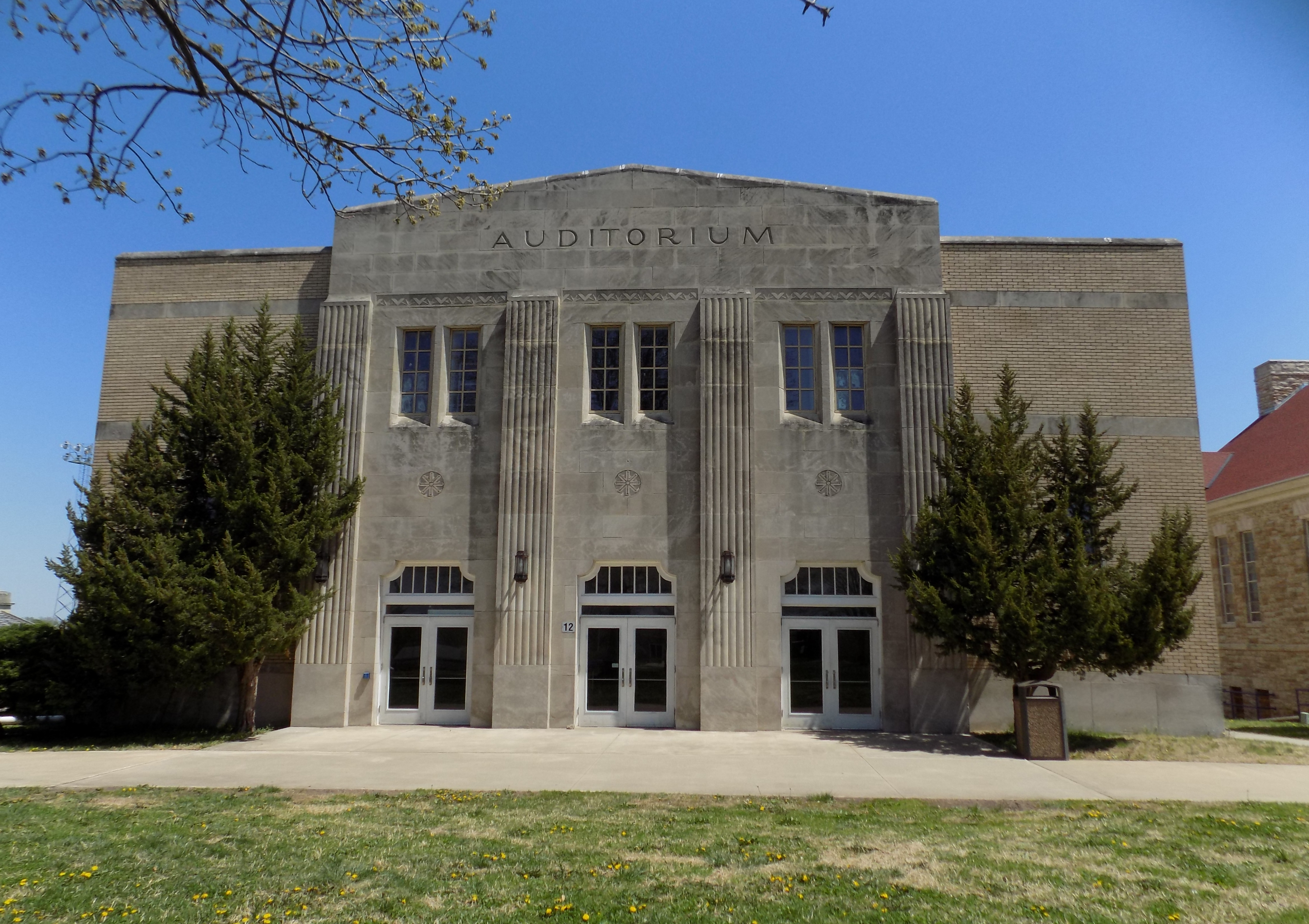
Auditorium

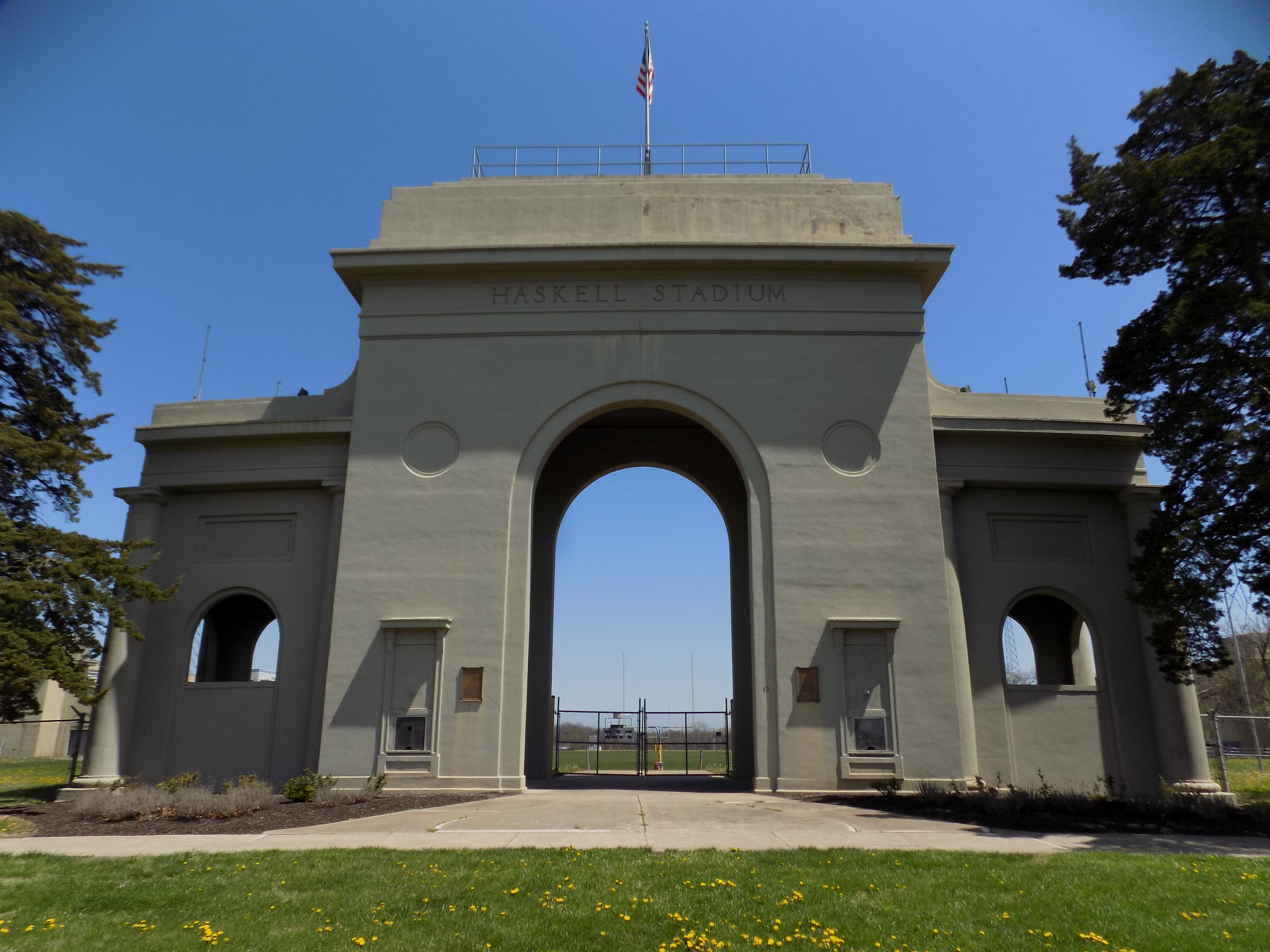
Haskell Arch

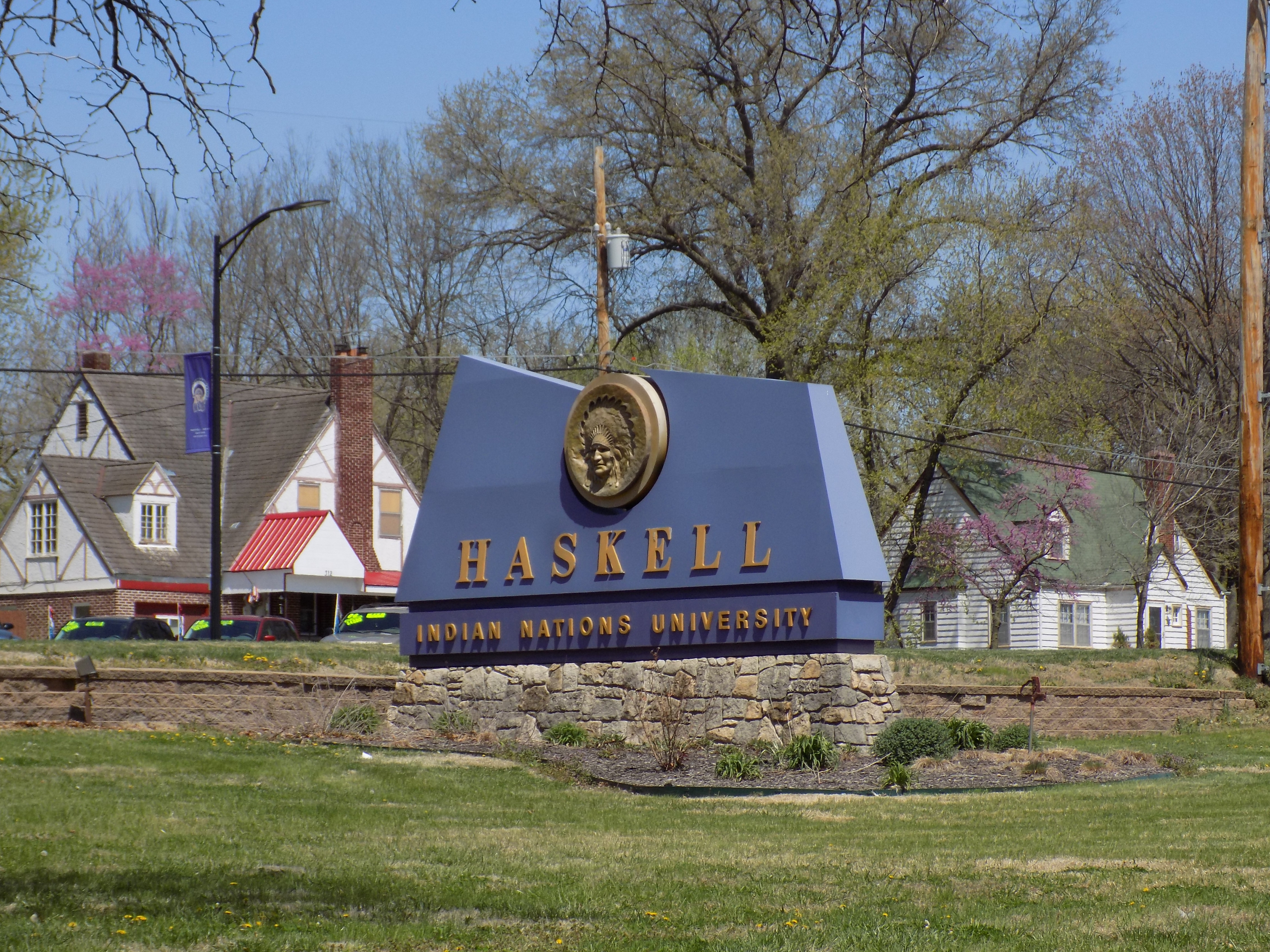
The main sign to the university

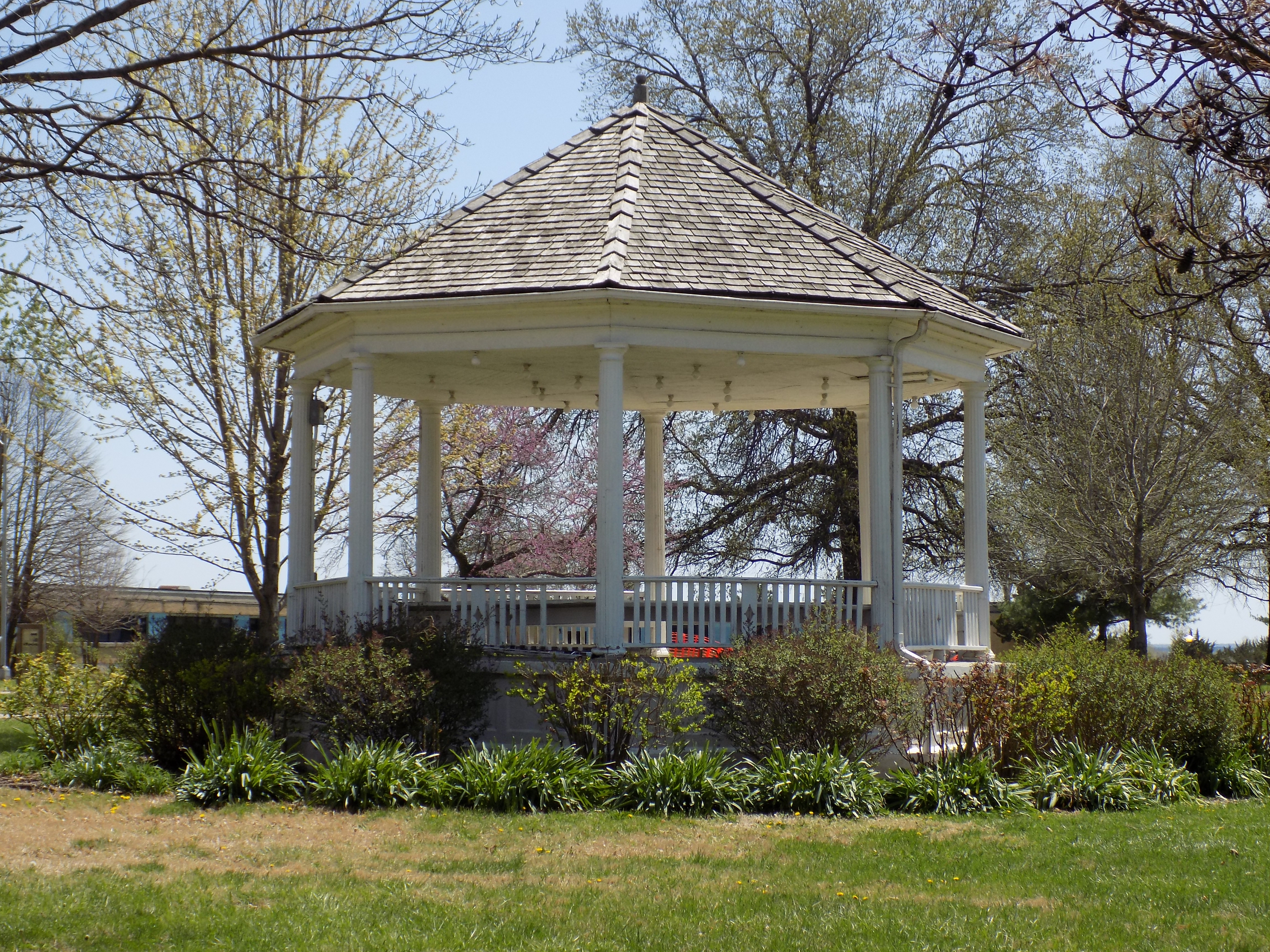
The small bandstand gazebo was constructed in 1908 and is on the NRHP

== Museums and libraries ==
The Haskell Cultural Center and Museum provides exhibits of interest about the school's history, beginning with its opening in 1884. Its archives include collections on Haskell and aspects of Native American history.

Tommaney Library provides a range of academic research resources in print, online and digital form.

== Haskell Medicine Wheel Earthwork ==
The Haskell Medicine Wheel Earthwork is located south of the campus. It was designed by Haskell professors, students, crop artist Stan Herd, and tribal elders, and dedicated in 1992 as a response to the 500th commemoration of the "Columbian Legacy".

According to the Haskell Catalog, the medicine wheel earthwork:

symbolizes the scope and richness of indigenous cultures, from the beginning of humankind to the present. The circle is symbolic of the perpetual and sacredness of the spirituality of native peoples. The spokes are the four directions. The circle marks the astrological locations of the Summer and Winter solstice and represent the death, rebirth, balance and healing in Mother Earth. The bear claw represents the strength needed for the survival of indigenous people. The thunderbird located to the east represents the spiritual traditions of tribal people and points to the sacred circle and sacred fire contained within the Medicine Wheel Teachings.

A replica of the medicine wheel is carved in the tile at the Haskell Cultural Center and Museum as a way of balancing the campus (with a medicine wheel on the north and south ends of campus).

== Organization ==
The university is one of 37 members of the American Indian Higher Education Consortium, an organization of Tribal colleges and universities.

== Academics ==
Haskell offers four baccalaureate degree programs and four associate degrees.

In 2022 the school's graduation was 45%, per the 2023 IPEDS Data Feedback Report published by the Institute of Education Science. The university received a #13 ranking on the 2010 "Top 50 Dropout Factory" list from Washington Monthly in their College Guide, with a graduation rate of 9%.

=== Associate degree programs ===
Haskell offers associate of arts (AA) degrees in a variety of fields, including: Communication Studies, Liberal Arts, Media Communication, Para Professional Education, and Social Work. The school also offers associate of science (AS) degrees in: Community Health, Natural Sciences, and Recreation Fitness Management.

=== Bachelor programs ===
The school also offers the four following bachelor programs:

==== Indigenous and American Indian Studies (BA) ====
This program provides an integrated foundation of interdisciplinary knowledge and the practical skills needed to contribute to the development of Indigenous American Indian and Alaska Native communities and nations. The program is designed to prepare students for graduate or professional schools, or to enter the workplace after graduation.

==== Business Administration (BS) ====
The School of Business offers the Bachelor of Science in business administration with emphases in management or tribal management. The management track emphasizes traditional academic study of contemporary management practices and theories common to the management of human, financial, technical, natural, and other resources. The Tribal Management track explores contemporary and historical issues that particularly affect management of tribal governments and enterprises.

==== Elementary Teacher Education (BS) ====
Education majors complete a Bachelor of Science Degree in Elementary Education; they must pass the Principles of Learning and Teaching (PLT) and Elementary Education exam to be eligible to apply for Kansas provisional licensure to teach kindergarten through the sixth grade. Other states may have differing requirements.

==== Environmental Sciences (BS) ====
This program provides a broad-based background to prepare students for graduate school or a career in environmental or biological fields. Courses offered include Biology, Ecology, Chemistry, Physics, Geography, Natural Resources, and Environmental Sciences. It is intended to add substance to indigenous concerns about sustainability.

== Student life ==
Undergraduate demographics as of Fall 2023
Race and ethnicity	Total
American Indian/Alaska Native	100%
Economic diversity
Low-income (Note: The percentage of students who received an income-based federal Pell grant intended for low-income students.)	60%
Affluent (Note: The percentage of students who are a part of the American middle class at the bare minimum.)	40%

More than 20 student organizations and clubs on campus provide students with chances to become involved in campus life and activities related to the larger community.

== Athletics ==
The Haskell (HINU) athletic teams are called the Fighting Indians. The school's team colors are purple, gold and white. The university is a member of the National Association of Intercollegiate Athletics (NAIA), primarily competing as an NAIA Independent within the Continental Athletic Conference since the 2015–16 academic year. The Fighting Indians previously competed in the defunct Midlands Collegiate Athletic Conference (MCAC) from 2001–02 to 2014–15 (when the conference dissolved).

HINU competes in 11 intercollegiate varsity sports: Men's sports include basketball, cross country, golf and track & field (indoor and outdoor); women's sports include basketball, cross country, softball, track & field (indoor and outdoor) and volleyball. Club sports include baseball and boxing. Former sports included football and co-ed cheerleading.

=== Football ===
Haskell had one of the best college football teams in the nation from 1900 to 1930. Due to funding shortfalls, the football program was suspended beginning for the 2015 season.

== Notable people ==
- Evelyne Bradley – American Navajo judge
- Emmett Bowles – professional baseball player
- Venida Chenault – government official and academic administrator
- Henry Roe Cloud – Tribal education advocate
- Sharice Davids – Member of U.S. Congress for Kansas Congressional District 3
- Larry Johnson – football offensive lineman in the National Football League
- Buck Jones – professional football player
- Nick Lassa – professional football player
- Gilbert L. Laws – Nebraska Secretary of State and U.S. Congressman
- Edward E. McClish – American military officer and guerrilla leader in the Philippines in World War II.
- Mayes McLain – professional football player
- Emmett McLemore – professional football player
- Billy Mills – Olympic gold medalist in 10,000m at Tokyo 1964 Summer Olympics
- Joe Pappio – professional football player
- Stan Powell – professional football player
- Steve Reevis – actor
- Pauline Small – first woman elected to a Crow Nation tribal office
- Barbara Starr Scott – Cherokee Nation tribal councilor (1983–1987, 1995–1999)
- Jim Thorpe – Double Gold Medalist at the 1912 Olympic Games. Member of the Pro Football Hall of Fame, College Football Hall of Fame, US Olympic Hall of Fame, and the United States Track & Field Hall of Fame
- Louis Weller – professional football player

== See also ==
- American Indian outing programs
