= Haskell-Baker Wetlands =

Nature preserve in Kansas

Coordinates: 38°55′N 95°14′W

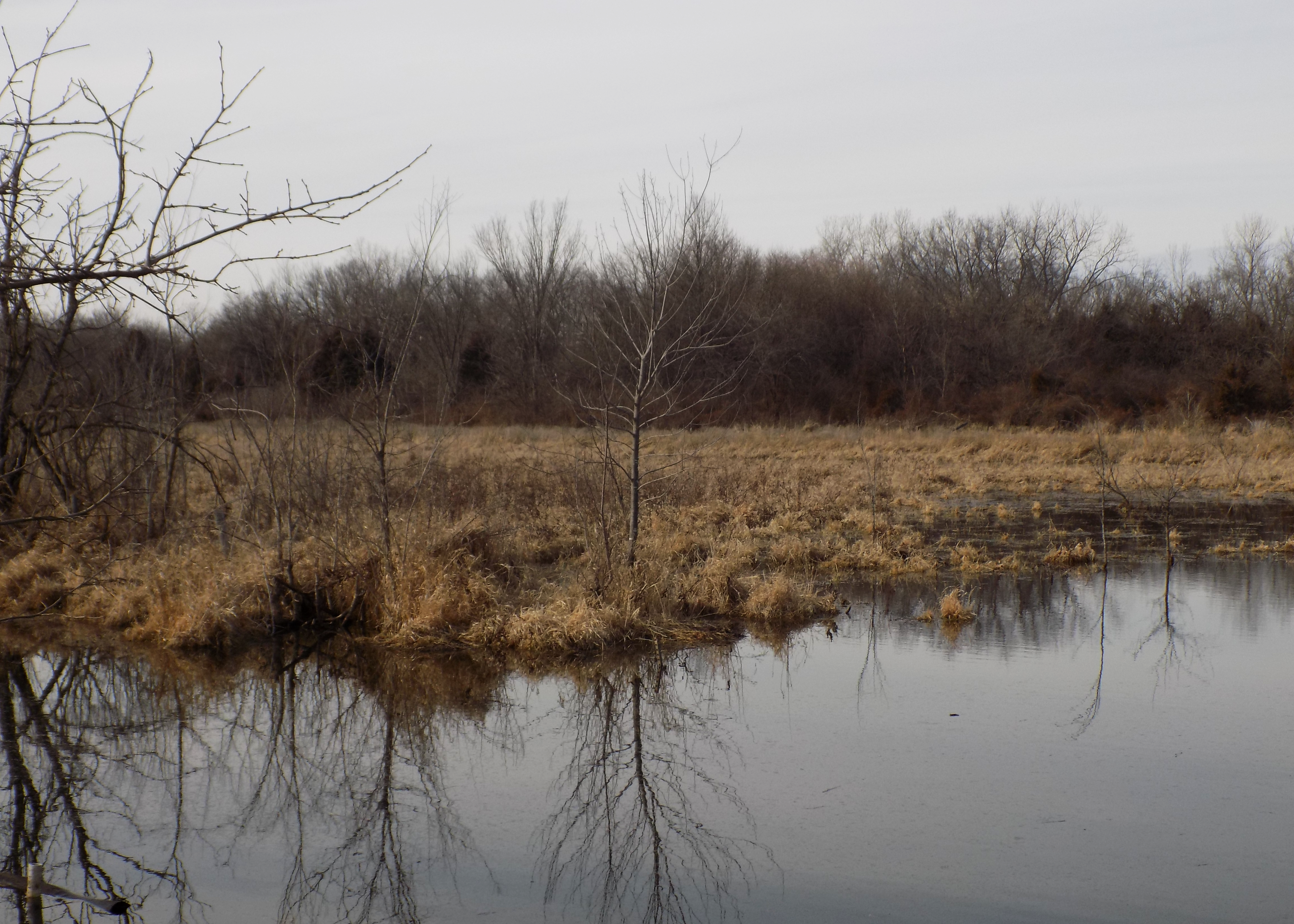
An image of the Haskell-Baker Wetlands during the winter, looking north (2017)

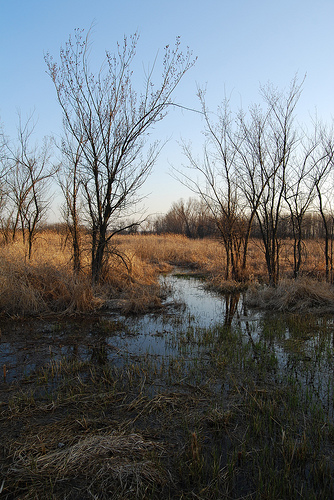
The Haskell-Baker Wetlands during the spring (2009)

The Haskell-Baker Wetlands (also known as the Baker Wetlands) is a nature preserve and artificially sustained wetland, spanning approximately 927 acres (3.8 km^{2}) south of Lawrence, Kansas, United States. It is associated with the Wakarusa River and sustained by levees and flood controls built in the 1990s.

Baker University owns 573 acres, the major portion of the site; Haskell Indian Nations University holds 27 acres, and the Kansas Department of Wildlife and Parks, and the University of Kansas hold 20 acres each. Baker University received its portion by a transfer from the United States Department of Health, Education, and Welfare (HEW) in 1968. This area was formerly used for farming by settlers and later was purchased by Haskell to teach farming to its students and be self-sustaining. When the school's functions changed, the Department of Interior transferred the property to the HEW, which declared it surplus. It was transferred via the General Services Administration and regular process to Baker University.

In 1969, the National Park Service declared the wetlands a National Natural Landmark. The wetlands support 413 documented species of vascular plant, 265 species of bird, and 61 additional vertebrate species.

== Mitigation replacement and trail ==
A proposal for completion of the South Lawrence Trafficway (SLT)—an extension of state highway K-10—through part of the Baker University campus affected part of the wetlands.

The plan to mitigate for lost wetlands, loss of pedestrian access, and highway noise was approved by the US Army Corps of Engineers, Kansas Department of Transportation, and Federal Highway Administration. Approximately 380 acres of man-made wetlands were developed adjacent to the site to fulfill this mitigation plan. The southern stretch of the Lawrence Loop, a 22-mile, multi-use, paved trail that encircles the City of Lawrence, was also constructed alongside the SLT as part of the mitigation plan.

== See also ==
- Kansas River
- Wakarusa River
