= Frank Tsosie Thompson =

Navajo code talker (1920–2008)

- Born: September 29, 1920; Crystal, New Mexico, U.S.
- Died: June 2, 2008 (aged 87); Breadsprings, New Mexico, U.S.
- Military career
- Allegiance: United States
- Awards: Congressional Silver Medal

Frank Tsosie Thompson (September 4, 1920 – June 2, 2008) was an American Navajo code talker in the United States Marines during World War II.

== Biography ==
Thompson was born in Crystal, New Mexico, on September 4, 1920. He attended board schools in Albuquerque and Fort Defiance, Arizona. He enlisted in the United States Marines on the day he graduated from high school, May 5, 1942.

Thompson served in the Headquarters Company, 3rd Battalion, 6th Marine Regiment of the 2nd Marine Division during World War II. He served in a number of battles across the Pacific theater, including Tarawa, Abemana Atoll, Guadalcanal, Saipan and Tinian. Thompson reached the rank of corporal. He remained in the U.S. Marines from May 5, 1942, until September 17, 1945.

Thompson attended New Mexico Highlands University from 1947 until 1948 after the war using the G.I. Bill. He became a carpenter by profession. He worked in maintenance for the Navajo Nation in Fort Defiance, Arizona, for 37½ years until his retirement in 1991.

He was awarded the Congressional Silver Medal for his service as a code talker in 2001.

Frank Thompson died of natural causes at the age of 87 on June 2, 2008, in Breadsprings, New Mexico. Navajo Nation President Joe Shirley Jr ordered that all American flags on the Navajo Nation be lowered to half staff from June 4 until June 7, 2008, in honor of Thompson. Shirley also issued a proclamation saying that Thompson "served the United States of America and the Navajo Nation with courage, honor and distinction." His funeral was held at the Sacred Heart Roman Catholic Church in Gallup, New Mexico, and he was buried in Hillcrest Cemetery.

Thompson was survived by his wife, Janet B. Thompson, his children Janice Thompson, Cassandra Bloedel, Floyd Thompson, Frankie Thompson, Terry Thompson, Francine Thompson and Valeri Llopis, and seven grandchildren.
