= Frybread Face and Me =

2023 film by Billy Luther

- Theatrical release poster
- Directed by: Billy Luther
- Written by: Billy Luther
- Produced by: Chad Burris
- Starring: Keir Tallman; Charley Hogan; Sarah H. Natani; Martin Sensmeier; Kahara Hodges
- Cinematography: Peter Simonite
- Edited by: Fred Koschmann
- Music by: Ryan Beveridge
- Production companies: Indion Entertainment; REI Co-op Studios
- Distributed by: ARRAY
- Release dates: March 11, 2023 (SXSW); November 24, 2023
- Running time: 82 minutes
- Country: United States
- Language: English

Frybread Face and Me is a 2023 American coming-of-age drama film written and directed by Billy Luther. It stars Keir Tallman, Charley Hogan, Sarah H. Natani, Martin Sensmeier, and Kahara Hodges. New Zealand actor and filmmaker Taika Waititi serves as an executive producer.

It had its world premiere at South by Southwest on March 11, 2023, before screening at the 2023 Toronto International Film Festival, and was released on November 24, 2023, in limited theaters by ARRAY and on Netflix.

== Premise ==
A boy from San Diego spends the summer with his Navajo grandmother on the reservation in Arizona, where he meets and connects with his cousin.

== Cast ==
- Keir Tallman as Benny
- Charley Hogan as Frybread Face (real name Dawn)
- Sarah H. Natani as Grandma
- Martin Sensmeier as Marvin
- Kahara Hodges as Aunt Lucy
- Morningstar Angeline as Ann
- Leilani Taliaferro as Ida
- Nasheen Sleuth as Aunt Sharon
- Jeremiah Bitsui as Uncle Roger
- Sunny Dooley as Navajo doctor
- Billy Luther as adult Benny (narrator)

== Production ==
In June 2021, it was announced that Morningstar Angeline and Martin Sensmeier had joined the cast of the film, with Billy Luther directing from a screenplay he wrote, with Taika Waititi executive producing. In September 2021, it was announced Keir Tallman, Sarah H. Natani, Kahara Hodges, Charley Hogan, and Jeremiah Bitsui had joined the cast of the film.

Principal photography took place in New Mexico.

== Release ==
Frybread Face and Me had its world premiere at 2023 South by Southwest Film & TV Festival on March 11, 2023. It screened at the 2023 Toronto International Film Festival in the Discovery section on September 11, 2023. In November 2023, ARRAY acquired distribution rights to the film in the United States, United Kingdom and Ireland. On November 24, 2023, the film received a limited theatrical release, alongside a Netflix release.

== Reception ==
On the review aggregator website Rotten Tomatoes, 97% of 29 critics' reviews are positive, with an average rating of 7.4/10. Metacritic, which uses a weighted average, assigned the film a score of 71 out of 100, based on 9 critics, indicating "generally favorable" reviews.

The film received was dubbed "a refreshing queer take on the coming of age genre", "absolutely charming", and "heartfelt". Angie Han of The Hollywood Reporter wrote that for what the film "lacks in drama, it makes up for in a boundless affection for its characters and an appreciation for the everyday details of their lives." Lisa Kennedy of Variety wrote that "watching this family interact is a reminder how rare it is to see so many American indigenous actors in a space, weaving the unique and universal into stories that expand our storehouse of their experience."
