= Evelyne Bradley =

Navajo Nation judge (1925–2013)

- Born: March 1, 1925; Fort Defiance, Arizona, U.S.
- Died: May 21, 2013 (aged 88)
- Citizenship: Navajo Nation and Americans
- Occupation: Judge

Evelyne E. Bradley (March 1, 1925 – May 21, 2013) was an American Navajo judge. She served as a district judge for the Navajo Nation from 1984 until her retirement in 1995. Bradley was one of the first women to become a judge within the Navajo Nation.

== Early life ==
Bradley was born in a hospital in Fort Defiance, Arizona, on March 1, 1925. Her Navajo clan was the Bitter Water born for Towering House. Her paternal grandparents' clan was Red House People, while her maternal grandparents' clan was Cliff Dwellers People. She was raised in Cross Canyon, located near the town of Ganado, Arizona. She graduated from North Phoenix High School in Phoenix, Arizona, and the Haskell Institute, now called Haskell Indian Nations University, in Lawrence, Kansas.

== Career ==
Bradley held a variety of positions with the U.S. and Navajo governments earlier in her career. She previously worked for the Bureau of Indian Affairs, the Office of Navajo Economic Opportunity, and the Navajo Housing Authority. She also worked as a court reporter before becoming a judge.

She became a Navajo Nation district judge from 1984 until her retirement from the bench in 1995. As a district judge, she served within the Ramah Navajo Indian Reservation, Tuba City and Kayenta, Arizona, judicial districts on the Navajo Nation.

After retiring as a Navajo Nation judge, Bradley was elected as a Justice of the Peace for Navajo County, Arizona. Her county office was based in Kayenta, Arizona. On January 9, 2007, she administered the oath of office to President of the Navajo Nation, Joe Shirley, Jr., for his second term.

== Death ==
Evelyne Bradley died on May 21, 2013, at the age of 88. She was survived by four children, 15 grandchildren and 17 great-grandchildren. Her funeral was held at the Good Shepherd Mission in Fort Defiance, Arizona.

== See also ==
- List of Native American jurists
- List of Native American politicians
- Native American women in politics
