= Miss Navajo (film) =

- Directed by: Billy Luther
- Produced by: Billy Luther; Duanna C. Butler; Fenton Bailey; Randy Barbato
- Cinematography: Gavin Wynn
- Edited by: Mike Rysavy; Tracee Morrison
- Music by: David Benjamin Strindberg
- Production company: Independent Television Service
- Distributed by: Independent Lens (U.S.)
- Release date: 2007
- Running time: 58 minutes
- Country: United States
- Languages: English; Navajo

Miss Navajo is a 2007 independent documentary film directed by Billy Luther. The film follows 21-year-old Crystal Frazier and six other Navajo women as they compete for the title of Miss Navajo Nation 2005–2006. Unlike mainstream beauty pageants, the Miss Navajo competition emphasizes Navajo language, cultural knowledge, and traditional skills rather than physical appearance. Contestants are required to speak Navajo fluently and demonstrate practices such as sheep butchering, rug weaving, and tortilla making. Through Frazier’s experience, the documentary explores themes of Indigenous identity, language preservation, and the role of Navajo women as cultural leaders. The film has been noted for presenting Native women through their own perspectives and for challenging stereotypes commonly found in mainstream media.

== Summary ==
Crystal Frazier, a 21-year-old woman from near Table Mesa, New Mexico, initially doubts her ability to succeed in the Miss Navajo Nation pageant and is uncertain whether she belongs among the other contestants. At the beginning of the film, she describes herself as shy and reluctant to speak in front of large groups. Although encouraged by her family, she enters the competition with little expectation of winning. As the contest approaches, however, she becomes increasingly aware of the importance of the title within the Navajo Nation and begins to take the role more seriously. She comes to understand that the winner is expected to act not only as a public representative, but also as a spokesperson for Navajo language, traditions, and values.

The film follows the five-day competition at the Navajo Nation Fair, where seven contestants are evaluated in a series of events designed to test their knowledge of Navajo culture and language. Participants are questioned on topics including Navajo government, history, and contemporary social issues such as substance misuse on reservations, education, and the changing role of women in Navajo society. They are also required to demonstrate their fluency in the Navajo language during interviews and public speaking events.

In addition to written and oral examinations, the contestants take part in several practical demonstrations. Each contestant must butcher a sheep according to traditional Navajo methods and prepare tortillas for the judges. They are also asked to present one traditional and one modern talent, reflecting the pageant’s emphasis on balancing Navajo customs with contemporary life. Throughout these events, the documentary frequently focuses on Crystal’s reactions and the way she gradually becomes more confident in her abilities.

As the competition continues, Crystal forms friendships with the other contestants and gains a greater appreciation for the responsibilities associated with the title. The documentary also includes scenes of her family observing the pageant and discussing what the competition means to them. Their support plays an important role in her growing confidence. By the end of the contest, Crystal is named runner-up. The film concludes one year later, when she reflects on the experience and explains that participating in the pageant helped her meet new people and better understand the leadership, courage, and responsibility expected of Navajo women.

== Navajo women and cultural roles ==
The film highlights the cultural roles and expectations placed on Navajo women through the structure of the Miss Navajo Nation pageant. Unlike mainstream beauty contests, the competition emphasizes leadership, cultural knowledge, and the ability to represent the Navajo Nation in public settings rather than physical appearance. Contestants are expected to demonstrate an understanding of traditional practices, including food preparation, as well as knowledge of Navajo history, government, and community values.

Throughout the documentary, the participants are presented as potential cultural ambassadors. The winner of the pageant is expected to serve as a spokesperson for Navajo traditions and to promote cultural practices within and beyond the community. This includes attending public events, engaging with Navajo youth, and encouraging the use of the Navajo language. The film shows that the role carries a sense of responsibility, requiring confidence, communication skills, and a strong connection to cultural identity.

The documentary also depicts the importance of family and community support in shaping these roles. Contestants are frequently shown interacting with relatives who provide encouragement and guidance. By following Crystal Frazier and the other participants, the film portrays Navajo women as active contributors to the continuation and representation of cultural traditions.

== Navajo language and preservation ==
The film places significant emphasis on the role of the Navajo language within the Miss Navajo Nation pageant and its broader importance to cultural identity. Fluency in Navajo is a core requirement for all contestants, who are expected to speak the language during interviews, public speaking events, and portions of the competition. The documentary shows that the ability to communicate in Navajo is closely tied to knowledge of cultural practices and community values.

Crystal Frazier’s experience highlights some of the challenges associated with maintaining fluency in the language. At the beginning of the film, she expresses uncertainty about her speaking ability and demonstrates hesitation during public interactions conducted in Navajo. As the competition progresses, she becomes more aware of the expectations placed on contestants to communicate effectively and represent the language in formal settings.

The film also reflects broader concerns about language preservation within the Navajo Nation. By requiring contestants to demonstrate fluency, the pageant promotes the continued use of Navajo among younger generations. Through its focus on language use in both everyday and ceremonial contexts, the documentary presents Navajo as an essential component of cultural continuity and identity.

== Cultural significance of the Miss Navajo pageant ==
The documentary presents the Miss Navajo Nation pageant as an event that differs significantly from mainstream beauty competitions in the United States. Rather than emphasizing physical appearance, the pageant prioritizes cultural knowledge, language proficiency, and the ability to represent the Navajo Nation. Contestants are evaluated on their understanding of Navajo history, government, and social issues, as well as their ability to demonstrate traditional skills such as sheep butchering and food preparation.

The film shows that the pageant serves as a means of preserving and promoting Navajo cultural practices. By requiring contestants to demonstrate both traditional and contemporary skills, the competition reflects the balance between maintaining cultural traditions and adapting to modern life. Participants are expected to embody values associated with leadership, responsibility, and community engagement.

The role of Miss Navajo Nation extends beyond the competition itself. The winner is expected to act as a cultural ambassador, representing the Navajo Nation at public events and promoting awareness of Navajo traditions and language. Through its focus on the structure and purpose of the pageant, the documentary portrays it as an institution that reinforces cultural identity and provides a platform for young Navajo women to engage with their heritage.
