= Bethany Yellowtail =

Native American fashion designer

- Ammaakealachehiibaachilakacheesh (Crow); Éše'héméóná'e (Cheyenne)
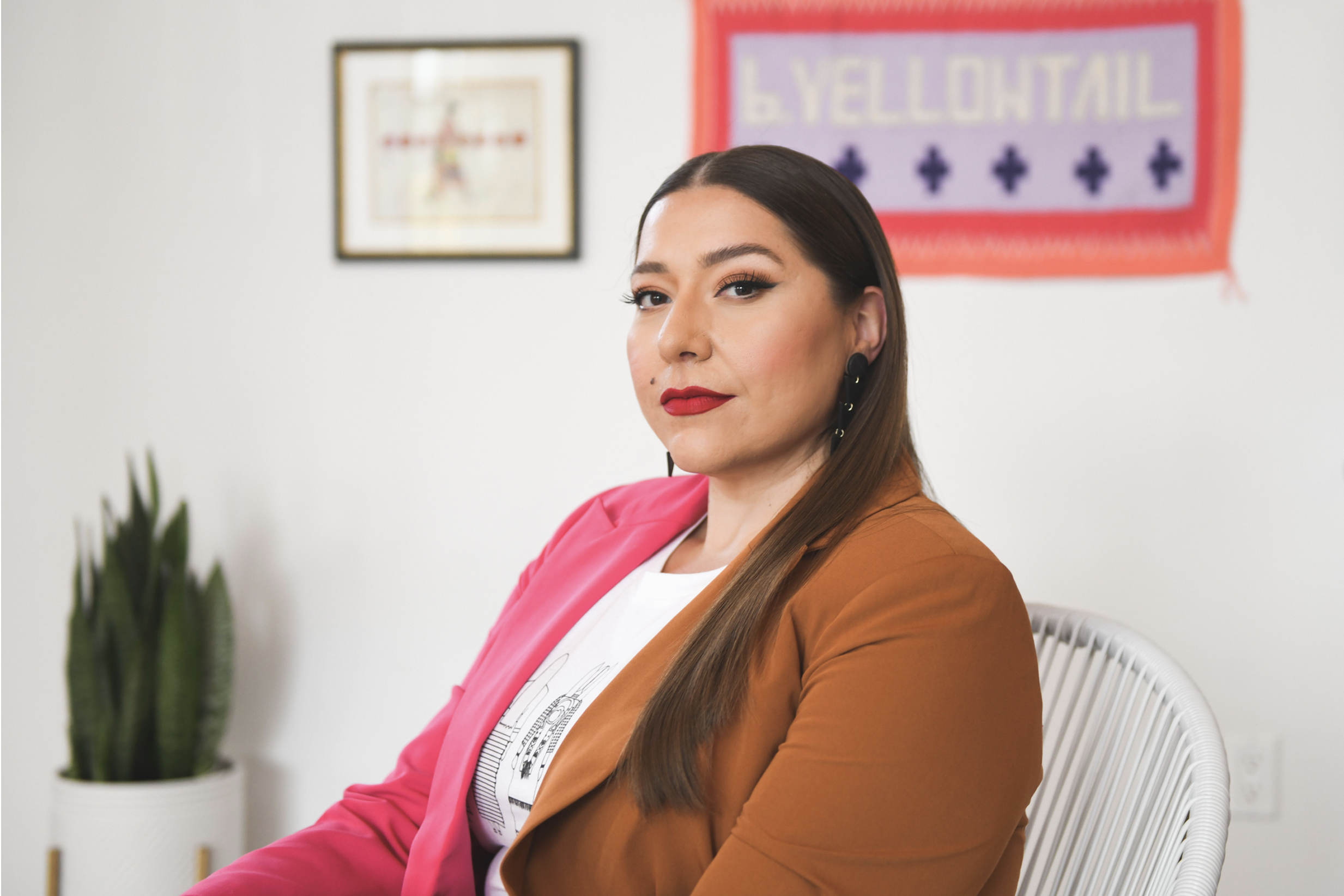
- Born: 1989 (age 36–37); Montana, United States
- Other names: Ammaakealachehiibaachilakacheesh, "Overcomes through Faith" (Crow) Éše'héméóná'e "Sun Road Woman" (Cheyenne)
- Citizenship: Northern Cheyenne Tribe, American
- Occupation: Fashion designer
- Years active: 2009-present
- Website: byellowtail.com

Bethany Yellowtail (born 1989) is a Native American fashion designer based in Los Angeles, California. Known for her work that reflects her Indigenous heritage, she is an enrolled citizen of the Northern Cheyenne Tribe and a descendant of the Crow Tribe of Montana. She serves as designer and CEO for her line B.Yellowtail.

== Early life and education ==
Yellowtail was born in the small rural town of Wyola, located in the southeast corner of Montana near the Wyoming border. She is an enrolled citizen of the Northern Cheyenne Tribe and grew up with her four siblings and parents on the Crow Reservation.

Yellowtail's parents and family members had been involved in creating Indigenous artistry all throughout her life. She originally piqued her interest in Indigenous jewelry, beaded earrings being one of the first pieces she would sell to others. Aunts and grandmothers taught her to sew, where her passion for fashion began.

Yellowtail attended Tongue River schools in Ranchester, Wyoming, 23 miles from her family's ranch in Wyola, Montana. She graduated from Tongue River High School in 2007. She attended the Fashion Institute of Design and Merchandising.

== Career ==
Yellowtail's beginnings in her corporate fashion career were with multiple name brands, which often would appropriate Native American Designs. Yellowtail began working in fashion with the BCBG Max Azria Group, then became a pattern maker for private labels. Her time with these brands pushed her to create her own company, B.Yellowtail, in 2015, to accurately represent Native American Culture.

In 2015, Bethany was selected as a First Peoples Fund Artist in Business Leadership Fellow. As a Native designer, Yellowtail confronts cultural appropriation in the fashion industry. PBS Indie Lens Storycast featured B.Yellowtail as part of a series of short films called alter-NATIVE by Billy Luther.

In 2022, Bethany was selected for Visas "She's Next in Fashion" and was recognized at the Green Carpet Fashion Awards. She was awarded alongside fellow honorees Aurora James, Rashad Robinson, and Tom Ford.

== Political ==
Yellowtail is an active supporter of women's rights. For the 2017 Women's March on the National Mall in Washington D.C., Yellowtail collaborated with fellow Montana artist John Isaiah Pepion to create a custom-designed scarf featuring Native American women, each wearing a War Bonnet. In Crow Nation culture, women traditionally do not wear a full headdress, except for the special occasion of the Shoshone War Bonnet Dance, regarded as the highest honor for Crow women. Yellowtail chose the design to underscore female empowerment and respect. The scarf was worn by the many Indigenous women as part of the Indigenous Women Rise, a grassroots advocacy group first gathering at the Women's March.

Another way that she has contributed to Indigenous female empowerment is through her Rez Girl Mentorship Fund. She collaborated with the Native Wellness Institute to further develop this program, in hopes of providing opportunities for vulnerable Indigenous communities, who have been affected by the Missing and Murdered Indigenous Relatives (MMIR) epidemic. This fund focuses on mentoring young Indigenous girls to understand and believe in their ability to do anything.

Yellowtail includes the works of several Native American artists and designers as part of The B.Yellowtail Collective, part of her efforts to support the entrepreneurship of fellow Native Americans.

== Personal ==
Bethany Yellowtail is a member of the Northern Cheyenne Nation, and hails from the Mighty Few District of the Crow Nation in Southeastern Montana. Yellowtail is now located in Los Angeles, where she relocated to launch her company. Yellowtail has always had a passion for fashion since her youth. She took an interest in sewing and beadwork, which her aunt and grandmother taught her on the reservation. She started making powwow shawls for her family and further developed her skills by making clothes in her home economics class in high school. She feels grateful to have this creative outlet as a Native Youth but recalls the judgment she faced from others when she expressed wanting to turn this hobby into a career.

== Gallery work ==
Along with Bethany Yellowtail's two fashion labels, the designer has also touched into the gallery world, such as having an artist spotlight at the Portland Art Museum. The spotlight from June 2016 discusses Yellowtail's heritage and what drives her inspiration in the fashion industry. The Field Museum in Chicago also hosted Yellowtail in an exhibit called “Apsáalooke Women and Warriors” where her designs are featured. The exhibit features a range of works such as historical and contemporary pieces from different generations and tribes.
