= Radmilla Cody =

Navajo singer and activist from Arizona, U.S. (born 1975)

Radmilla A. Cody
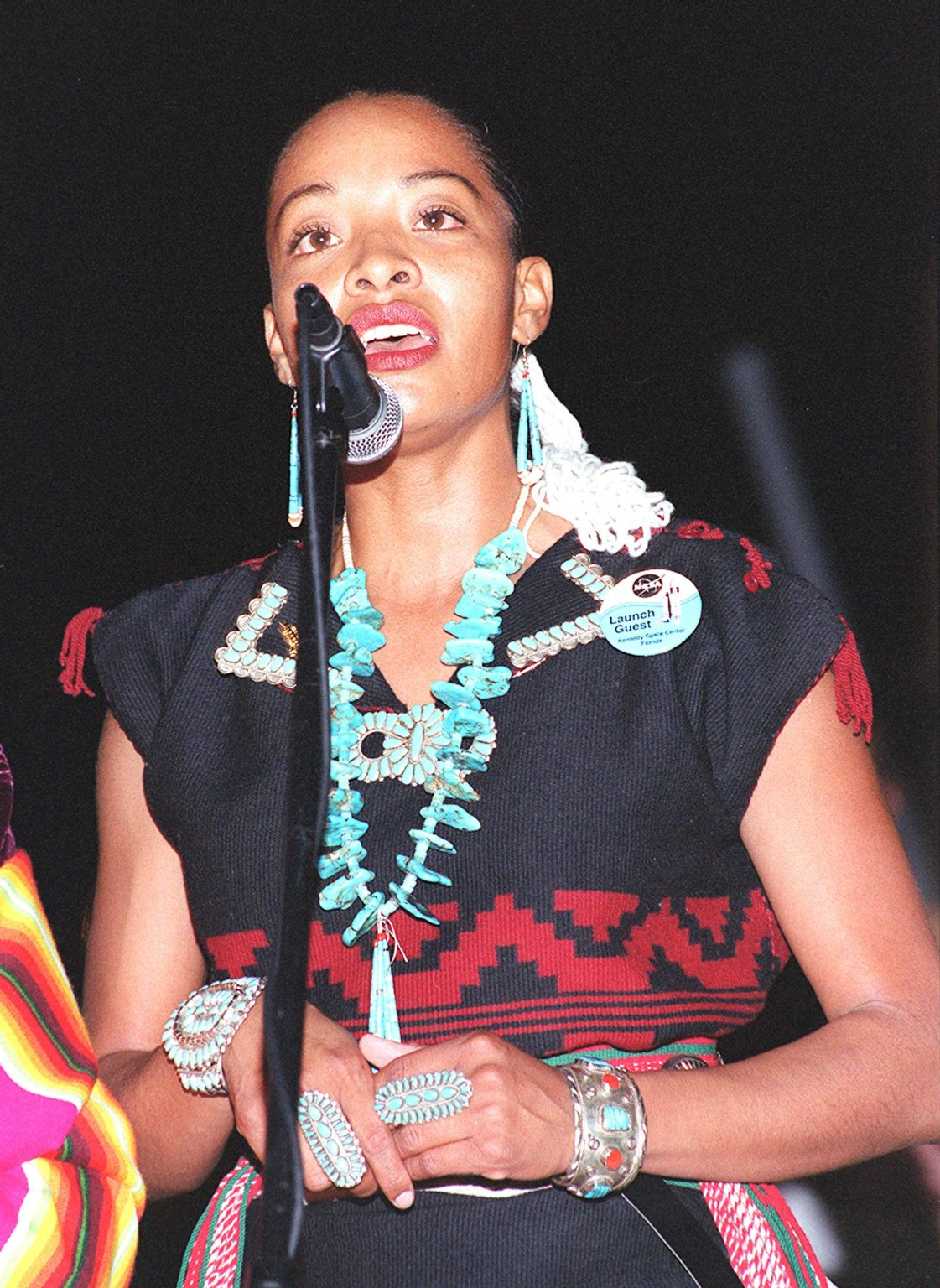
- Radmilla Cody sings The Star-Spangled Banner in Navajo at the Kennedy Space Center, Florida (2002)
- Born: 1975 (age 50–51); Arizona, U.S.
- Citizenship: Navajo Nation and United States
- Known for: Miss Navajo Nation, singer, Anti-domestic violence activist
- Title: 46th Miss Navajo Nation
- Term: 1997–1998
- Predecessor: Josephine Ann Tracy
- Successor: Sevaleah Begay Tsosie
- Website: www.radmillacody.com

Notes
- 1. As a matrilineal society, the Navajo Nation does not consider one's paternal lineage for questions of traditional membership.

Radmilla A. Cody (born 1975) is a Navajo model, singer, and anti-domestic violence activist who was the 46th Miss Navajo from 1997 to 1998.

She was the first biracial Miss Navajo and thus so far the only Miss Navajo partially of African-American heritage, her nomination sparked considerable debate over Navajo identity. After her tenure, allegations of drug-trafficking and involvement in money-laundering, resulting in her subsequent arrest and imprisonment, led to verbal racial attacks as well as support.

== Early life ==
Cody was born into the Tłʼááshchíʼí nilǫ́ǫ clan and born for Naakaii Łizhiní yáshchíín of the Navajo Nation. Her father is African-American. She was raised in the rural areas of the Navajo Nation by her maternal grandmother, speaking Navajo. In an interview with Vermont Public Radio, Cody recalled an instance of her grandmother getting upset with her when she spoke English, which, according to her grandmother, was nothing but "walla walla walla." Daily chores included the herding of sheep and occasional weaving. Cody later recalled that this time spent in relative solitude gave her time to practice her early singing skills with the "first audience [being] the sheep", and the surrounding environment gave her an appreciation of the sounds of nature. Since her grandmother had converted to Christianity, another influence was Christian choirs visiting the local church.

== Career ==
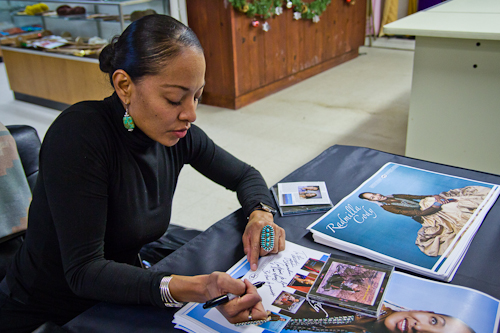
Radmilla Cody signing autographs at the Navajo Arts and Crafts Enterprise in Window Rock, Arizona.

In 1997, Cody participated in and won the Miss Navajo contest, an event for which extensive knowledge of Navajo traditions and fluency in the Navajo language are required, rather than the ideals of beauty promoted by Western beauty pageants. After her tenure, she began a career as recording artist.

Cody's songs are a mix of traditional Navajo music and songs incorporating lyrics written by her uncle, Herman Cody. Her first album, entitled Within the Four Directions, which includes the Navajo version of The Star-Spangled Banner ("Dah Naatʼaʼí Sǫʼ bił Sinil"), appeared in 2000. She won the 2002 Native American Music Award for Best Female Artist for her album Seed of Life, and has since released two more collections, Spirit of a Woman and Precious Friends, in 2005 and 2007, respectively. Her latest album is Shi Keyeh or Songs for the People released in 2011. This album was nominated for Best Regional Roots Album at the 2012 Grammy Awards. Cody was the first Native American singer nominated in this new category which succeeded to great controversy a standalone category for Native American music and Latin Jazz two-year prior to this award ceremony.

In 2002, Cody sang the Navajo version of The Star-Spangled Banner at the Kennedy Space Center as John Herrington became the first enrolled member of a Native American nation to fly into space.

== Controversy ==
In 2003, Cody pleaded guilty to "misprison [sic] of a felony" for wiring $1,000 to her boyfriend who was involved in the trafficking of marijuana in Las Vegas, Nevada, and she admitted to knowing that the money would be used for such illegal activities; she served 21 months in jail. Subsequently, Cody became subjected to public racial attacks, commenting on her African American descent; others voiced support and understanding for her situation due to her boyfriend's being abusive and oppressive. She has since become an activist against domestic violence.

== Discography ==
- Within the Four Directions (2000)
- Seed of Life (2002) 2002 Native American Music Awards Best Female Artist
- Spirit of a Woman (2005)
- Precious Friends (2007)
- Shi Keyah: Songs for the People (2011)
