= Beulah Melvin Allen =

Native American physician

- Born: July 19, 1937 (age 88); Eureka, California, United States
- Citizenship: Navajo Nation and U.S.
- Occupation: physician

Beulah Margaret Melvin Allen (born July 19, 1937) is a Diné physician. In 1952, at the age of 23, she was the first Miss Navajo Nation.

== Life ==
Beulah Margaret Melvin was born in Eureka, California, on July 19, 1937, moving with her family at 18 months old to Fort Defiance, Arizona, on the Navajo Reservation. Her mother was a nurse at the Fort Defiance Indian Hospital. In 7th grade, she moved to California and stayed there until she finished high school. In 1952, Melvin was selected as Miss Navajo at the annual Navajo Nation Fair. At the time, the competition was determined by whichever contestant received the largest applause.

Starting in 1954, she attended Barnard College, planning to study there for two years. In 1955, she attended Arizona State College, and in 1956, she spent her junior year at the University of Oregon.

She attended Cornell Medical College in 1958 and 1959, receiving a Navajo Tribal scholarship to attend both years. In 1961, she graduated from The University of Arizona with a bachelor's degree in anthropology.

On November 14, 1969, Beulah married Richard N. Allen in Contra Costa, California.

She received a fellowship to attend the University of Arizona College of Medicine, graduating around the early 1980s.

In 1981, she won the Henry J. Kaiser Family Foundation Merit Award.
