= Billy Luther =

Director and filmmaker

- Born: Winslow, Arizona, U.S.
- Occupation: Director
- Years active: 2002–present

Billy Luther is a Native American independent film writer, producer and director. He has made several documentaries and short films. He belongs to the Navajo, Hopi, and Laguna Pueblo tribes. He is known for his movies Frybread Face and Me (2023) and Miss Navajo (2007), and the 2022 television series Dark Winds.

== Early life ==
He descends from the Navajo, Hopi, and Laguna Pueblo peoples. Luther studied film work at Columbia College Chicago, and then in Hampshire College in Amherst, Massachusetts. In 2000, he accepted an internship at the Smithsonian's National Museum of the American Indian in New York City, where he contributed to the production of the museum's native American Film + Video Festival in 2000 and 2003.

== Career ==
Billy Luther began directing and making short films as a student at Hampshire College in Amherst, Massachusetts. One of these films was Face Value (2000), a short documentary on racial profiling.

Miss Navajo was Billy Luther's first documentary film he directed. In this film, Luther explores the annual Miss Navajo pageant, which his mother won in 1966, and how contestants must demonstrate traditional skills such as language fluency and sheep shearing and butchery. It was produced and distributed by Independent Lens, a series on the PBS channel. It premiered at the 2007 Sundance Film Festival and received a 2007 Michael Moore Special Founders Prize. The film has traveled to over 300 festivals and is taught in schools, colleges, and universities worldwide.

Grab was Luther's second major documentary film, which premiered at the 2011 Sundance Film Festival. In the film, Luther portrays a Navajo community with many obstacles, yet they continue to practice and observe traditions. It tells the story of the Laguna ceremonial practice of giving. Grab gives the audience views into the lives of the families who have pledged to gift items and help the community. These families toss food, cultural items, and other goodies from the roofs of their houses to the participants below to "grab." Grab was narrated by actress Parker Posey.

Luther co-directed the Native American episode of MTV World's Rebel Music, a world-traveling documentary series. The series was launched online through Facebook and became MTV's highest-viewed online content in its history. Rebel Music, the series, was executive produced by acclaimed artist and activist Shepard Fairey, who also created the visual identity. Rebel Music examines the lives of young people using art and music to spark change around the world. In November 2014, coinciding with Native American Heritage Month, the episode Rebel Music: Native American debuted as MTV's first long-form program on Facebook. The episode featured "Frank Waln, a hip-hop artist seeking to protect the environment and his heritage, and pop musician Inez Jasper, demanding attention for women's rights and safe harbor from violence."

Luther directed and produced Red Lake, a short documentary film about a high school shooting on the Red Lake Indian Reservation in northern Minnesota. The film follows three survivors as reuniting ten years after the tragic event. The 30-minute film premiered at the 2016 Los Angeles Film Festival and was nominated for Best Short Film at the 2016 International Documentary Association (IDA) Awards.

Luther's web-series, alter-NATIVE, debut on 2018 in PBS' IndieLens StoryCast YouTube channel. The series produced by ITVS and PBS followed a year in Native fashion designer Bethany Yellowtail life on her journey to create a line inspired by women on the front lines of political activism. The second season, also known as alter-Native: Kitchen, followed three Native and Hawaiian chefs: Brian Yazzie, a Navajo/Diné chef from Arizona, based in Minnesota; Kalā Domingo, a Hawaiian culinary student; and Hillel Echo-Hawk, a Pawnee-Athabaskian chef and caterer in Seattle. The chefs prepare traditional foods from their Indigenous cultures that have sustained their communities for generations and modernize them for the next generation.

Frybread Face and Me, Luther's narrative feature debut, premiered at the 2023 SXSW film festival. The film is about an 11-year-old city boy who is sent to his grandmother's ranch on the Navajo reservation. There, he learns about family, tradition, and Navajo culture, and gains new insights into his own history and Indigenous culture.
