= Crystalyne Curley =

American politician

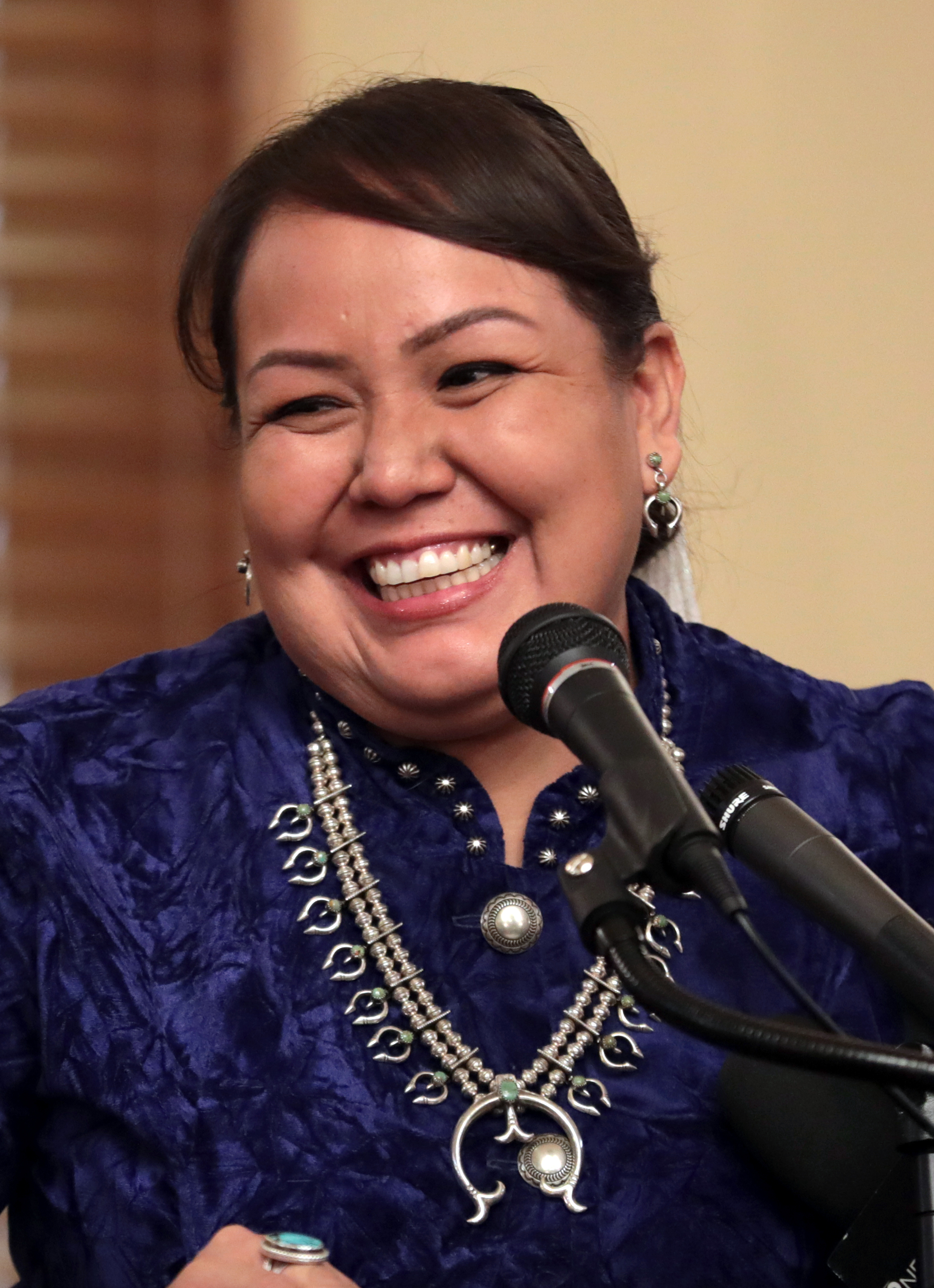
- Curley in 2023

President-elect of the Navajo Nation
- Assuming office January 12, 2027
- Vice President: Chris Deschene (elect)
- Succeeding: Buu Nygren

Speaker of the Navajo Nation Council
- Incumbent
- Assumed office January 23, 2023
- Preceded by: Otto Tso

Member of the Navajo Nation Council
- Incumbent
- Assumed office January 10, 2023
- Preceded by: Kee Allen Begay

Personal details
- Born: December 26, 1985 (age 40)
- Citizenship: American; Navajo Nation
- Education: Arizona State University, Tempe (BA); University of New Mexico (MPA)
- Awards: Miss Navajo (2011)

Crystalyne Curley (born December 26, 1985) is an American politician who is the president-elect of the Navajo Nation, and will be the first woman to hold that position. She is currently serving as the 11th speaker of the Navajo Nation Council since 2023, and was the first woman to hold that position as well. Curley was Miss Navajo from 2011 to 2012.

== Life ==
Curley is from Fish Point, Arizona. She is Tsénjíkiní and born for Tó’aheedlíinii. Her maternal grandfather is Kinyaa’áanii, and her paternal grandfather is Dził T’aadi Kinyaa’áanii. Curley graduated with two bachelor's degrees from the Arizona State University. She earned a master's in public administration from the University of New Mexico.

Curley was Miss Navajo from 2011 to 2012. She is a fluent speaker of Navajo.

== Political career ==
Curley ran for the Navajo Nation Council Delegate position in 2022. She is currently working in the Navajo Nation Speaker's Office. She later served as the senior public information officer for Navajo president Jonathan Nez.

On November 8, 2022, Curley was elected delegate after defeating incumbent Kee Allen Begay. She is the first woman to represent the Tselani/Cottonwood, Nazlini, Blue Gap/Tachee, Low Mountain, and Many Farms communities on the Navajo Nation Council. In January 2023, the council elected Curley as its speaker, making her the first woman to hold the position and the first fluent Navajo speaker in the role since Johnny Naize's resignation in 2014.

During the tenure of Navajo president Buu Nygren, Curley was a frequent critic of his administration. In 2025, Curley introduced legislation to remove him and vice president Richelle Montoya from office on the grounds of financial impropriety and other misdeeds, which Nygren denied.

On April 24, 2026, Curley announced her candidacy for the 2026 Navajo Nation presidential election. She was one of 16 candidates competing in the primary, along with Nygren and former Navajo vice presidents Frank Dayish and Myron Lizer. Curley came in second in the primary behind attorney Justin Jones, advancing to the general election. Curley won the general election by 32,094 votes to Jones's 30,979, becoming the first woman elected Navajo Nation president.

== See also ==
- List of Native American politicians
- Native American women in politics

Political offices
Preceded by Buu Nygren	President of the Navajo Nation; Taking office 2027	Elect
