= Venida Chenault =

American academic administrator

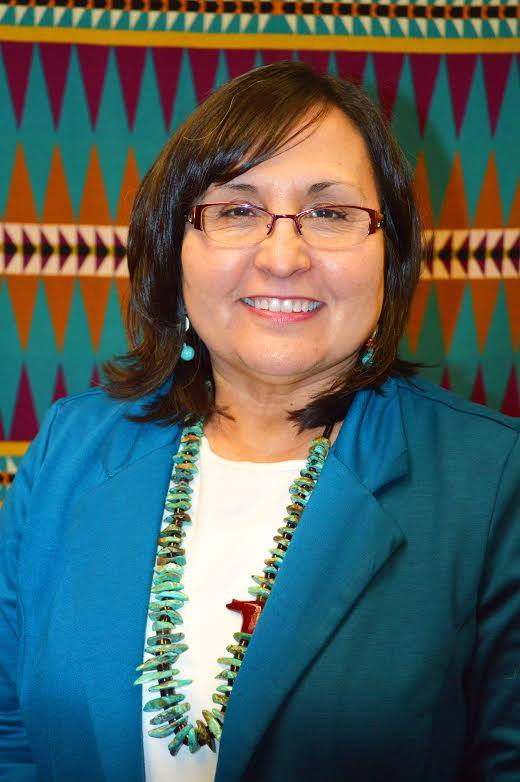
- Chenault in 2014

President of the Haskell Indian Nations University
- In office January 2014 – March 2019
- Preceded by: Chris Redman
- Succeeded by: Ronald Graham

Personal details
- Education: Haskell Indian Nations University; University of Kansas

Venida S. Chenault is an American Potawatomi government official and academic administrator who served as president of Haskell Indian Nations University (HINU) from 2014 to 2019. She was previously a professor of social sciences and served as the HINU vice president of academic affairs from 2004 to 2014.

== Early life and education ==
Chenault is a member of the Prairie Band Potawatomi Nation. She is from the Lawrence, Kansas metropolitan area. Chenault attended Haskell Indian Nations University (HINU) as a student in the Fall of 1975 and the Spring of 1984. She later attended the University of Kansas where she earned a bachelor's degree in social work in 1986, a master's in social work in 1990, and a Ph.D. in philosophy in 2004.

== Career ==
In 1991, Chenault jointed HINU's social work faculty and was an advisor where she taught and developed pre-professional courses and curriculum in social work, American Indian studies and addiction until August 2004. During that time, Chenault-White was a professor of social sciences (1994), served as interim director of American Indian studies (June 1996 to July 1999); as acting associate dean for the Division of Instruction (December 1997 to June 1998); as acting director of the Institute for Distance Education (April to August 2003); and as co-director of a Ford Foundation grant that Haskell held in conjunction with the University of Kansas, exploring the Native American experience. Chenault's scholarship specializes on the violence and substance abuse activity and prevention within the American Indian community. She developed and taught courses on human behavior, community health social work practice, chemical dependency and social work as they relate to Native people.

From October 2008 to October 2009, Chenault served as a Visiting Scholar in Social Welfare at the University of Kansas School of Social Welfare, where she worked to advance research and scholarship on the topic of violence and abuse against Indigenous women. She also authored a book on the same topic during this period.

In December 2004, Chenault was named HINU's vice president of academic affairs, which gave her administrative oversight of a $3-$4 million budget and supervisory responsibility for all academic programs, budgets, faculty and staff within the division of academic affairs. In her position she also served as acting vice president for university services from October 2009 to January 2010; acting Haskell president from January to May 2010 (succeeding Linda Sue Warner); and at Bureau of Indian Education (BIE) headquarters in Washington, D.C., from September 2012 to April 2013. While with the BIE, she helped lead key priority post-secondary education projects, including developing partnership agreements with tribal colleges and universities (TCUs) and working with the Bureau of Indian Affairs’ Office of Justice Services and the National Park Service to design professional development curriculum. From 2006 to 2007, she also held consultations and workshops on tribal sovereignty and self-determination as well as academic assessment and research for TCUs. In 2011, Chenault served as interim president, replacing Chris Redman. On January 12, 2014, Chenault was selected by the Bureau of Indian Education (BIE) to serve as the Haskell Indian Nations University.

She took a special assignment with the BIE in November 2018. Daniel Wildcat performed the duties of president during her absence. In January 2019, Chenault assignment was extended by another sixty days. She was succeeded by Ronald Graham. In March 2019, Chenault took a program analyst position in the BIE office of research, policy, and post-secondary education.

== Personal life ==
Chenault's son, Joshua Arce is an academic administrator who served in various roles at HINU during his mother's tenure including as head of the IT department, acting dean of students, and acting president.

== Selected works ==
- Chenault, Venida S. (2011). Weaving Strength, Weaving Power: Violence and Abuse Against Indigenous Women. Carolina Academic Press. ISBN 978-1-59460-563-5.
