= Chine-collé =

Printmaking method

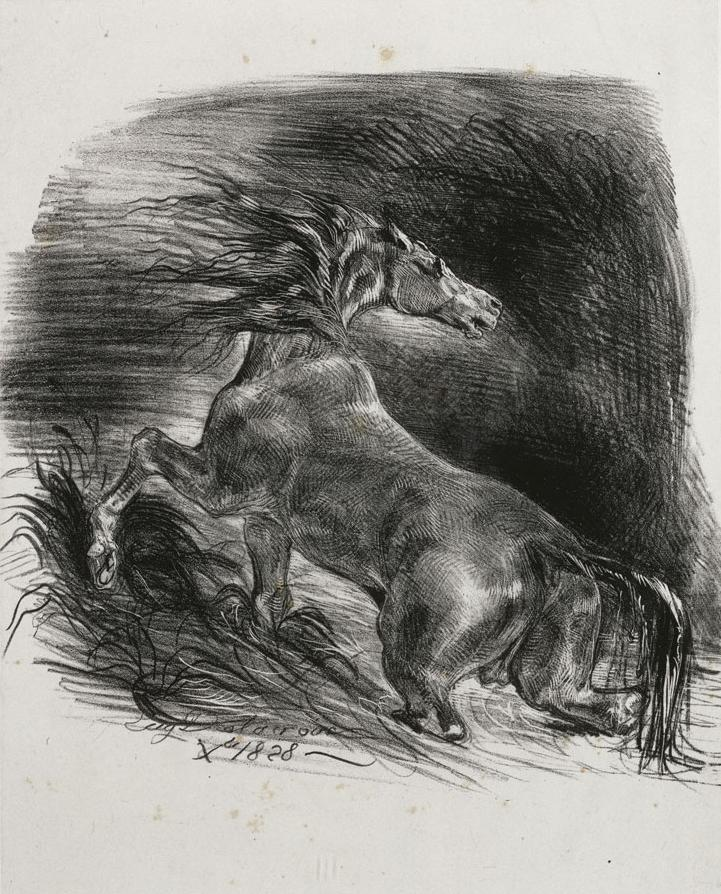
Chine-collé print on vellum by Eugène Delacroix, 1828

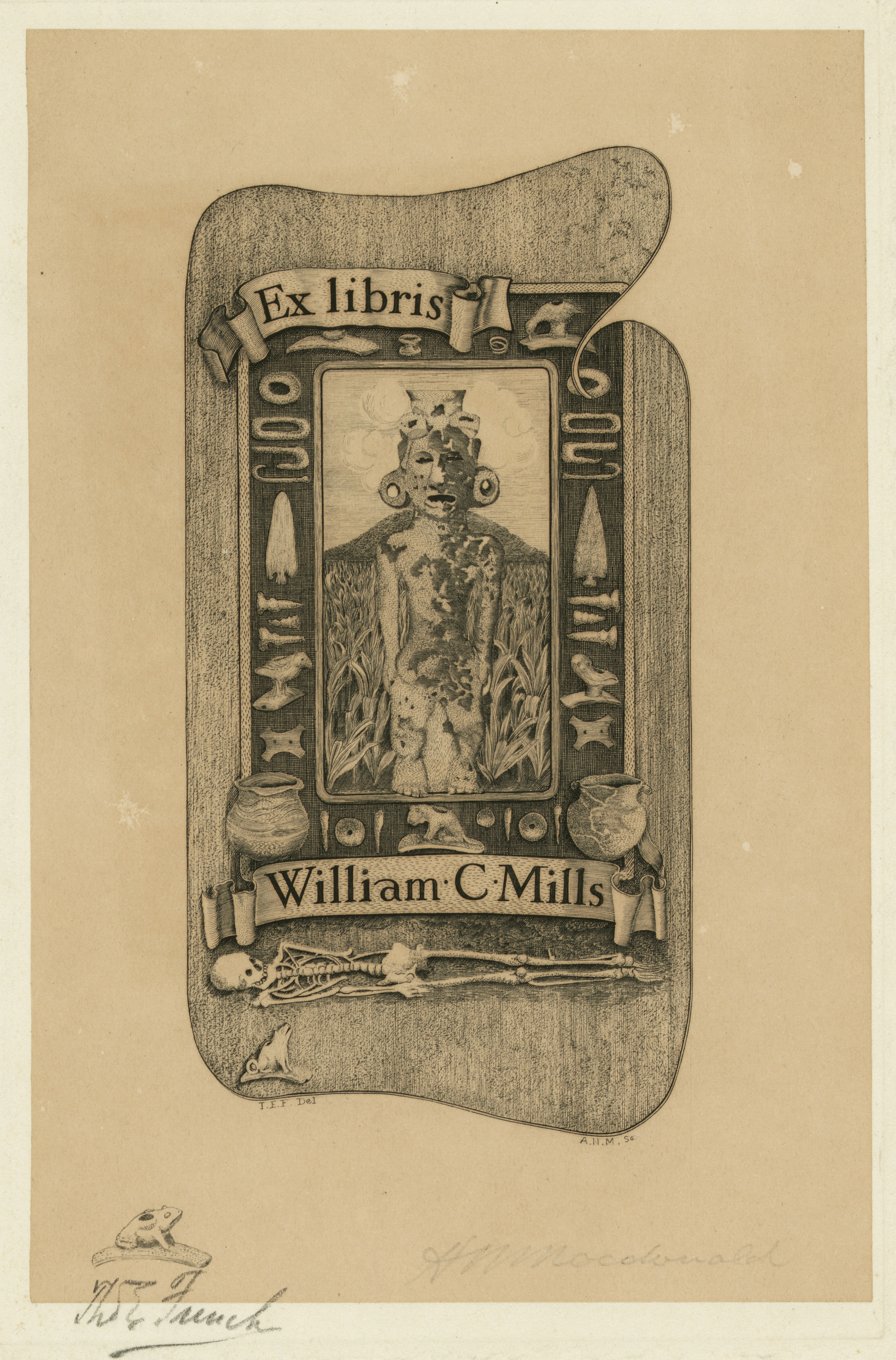
Print on chine collé of a bookplate designed for William Corless Mills, c. 1917

Chine-collé or chine collé (French: [ʃin.kɔ.le]) is a printmaking technique in which the image is transferred onto a surface that is bonded onto a heavier support in the printing process. One purpose is to allow the printmaker to print on a much more delicate surface, such as Japanese paper or linen, that pulls finer details off the plate. Another purpose is to provide a background colour behind the image that is different from the surrounding backing sheet.

The final image will depend on the design and ink color of the printed image, the color and opacity of the paper to which the image is directly printed (plus any inclusions such as petals or fibers in that paper), and the color of the backing sheet.

== Etymology and history ==
Chine-collé roughly translates from French chine = China, and collé, meaning glued or pasted. The word chine is used because the thin paper traditionally used in the process was imported to Europe from China, India and/or Japan.

Chine-collé is sometimes mistakenly used to refer to any type of collage.

== Methods ==
In the typical "direct print" method, the plate is inked; thin paper (such as Washi paper, commonly known as rice paper) is dampened, placed on the inked plate and trimmed to size; paste is applied to the thin paper; and the ensemble (plate plus thin paper with paste) is placed on a dampened backing sheet. This is then run through a printing press. In the pressure of the press, the ink is transferred to the thin paper, and the thin paper is simultaneously adhered to the backing paper. An advantage of this method is that the thin paper will be exactly the desired size, since it is trimmed to size and then quickly affixed in place.

Another way of printing the direct method is to have the thin paper already cut to size before preparing the plate to print. The heavier print paper has been put in the bath and dampened according to the printmaker's preference, then set aside. If the thin paper was painted on, it has been dried and is also set aside, ready. The plate is inked and wiped then placed on the press face up. Thin paste is brushed on the back of the rice paper and it is placed face down on the plate and registered. The paste is put on just enough to coat but not saturate, which dampens the thin paper appropriately. If one tries to brush paste on a damp piece of rice paper, it will tear. The print paper is then placed on top of the pasted side of the thin paper, a sheet of newsprint added on top of the stack, and the felts then covering the stack. It is then run through the press. This process is less tricky to maneuver than the first method, is cleaner, and more accurate in registration.

In the typical "pre-pasted" method, the thin paper (dry) is trimmed to the size of the plate, then paste is applied and allowed to dry. When the printmaker is ready to print, the paper is dampened to activate the paste and placed, paste-side up, on an inked plate. Then, the ensemble (plate plus thin paper with paste) is placed on a dampened backing sheet and run through a press as described above. An advantage of the pre-pasted method is that once dried, the paste-applied papers can be stored indefinitely, just like a lick-and-stick postage stamp. A disadvantage of this method is that because the paper is trimmed dry, the artist must take into account how much in each direction the paper will expand when it is dampened prior to printing.

== Paper ==
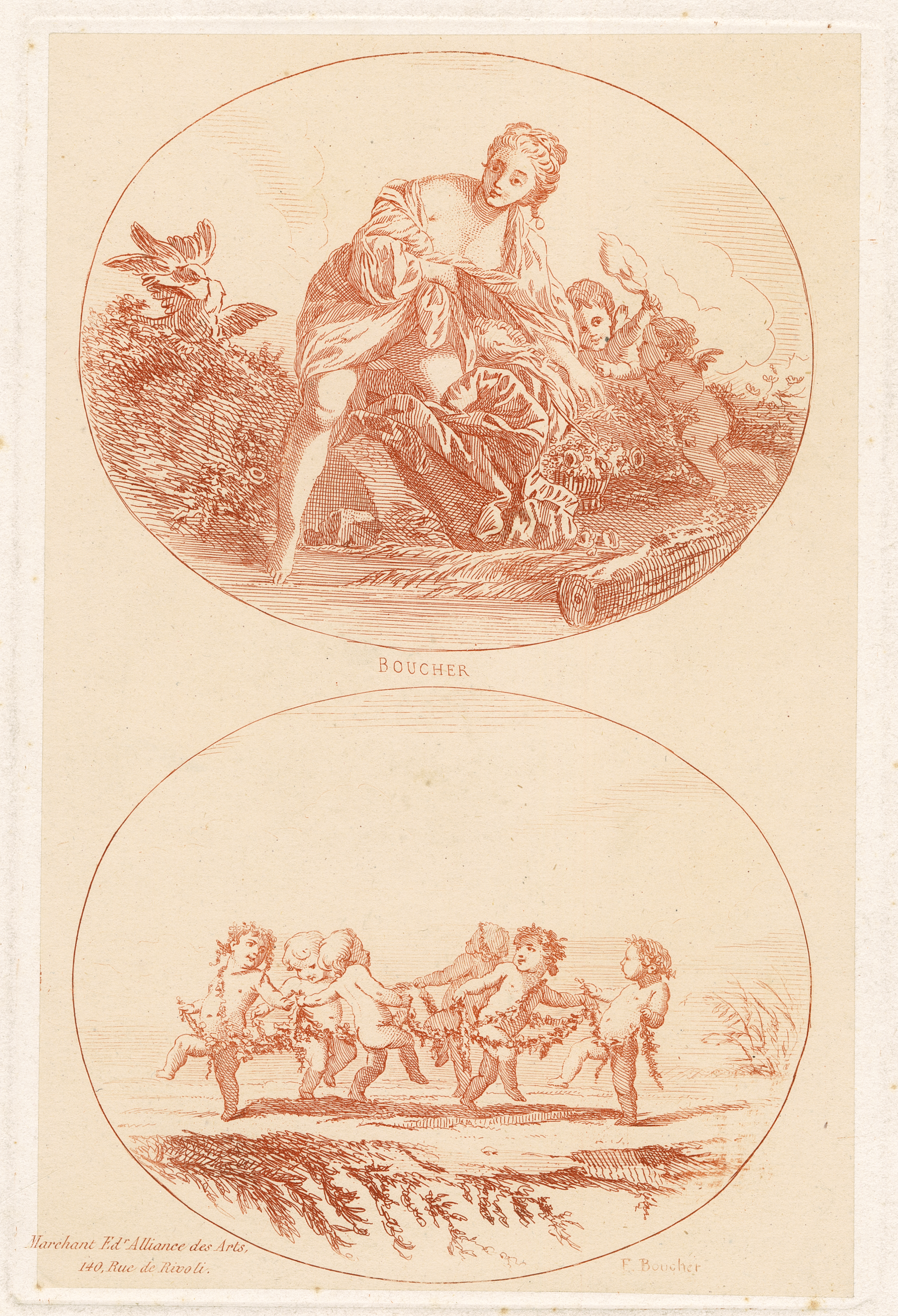
Anonymous (France) after François Boucher, A Woman with Two Putti, and Six Putti Dancing in a Circle, 19th century, engraving on chine-collé

Some artists have moved away from precise trimming of a single sheet of paper to the size of the printing plate when using this method. For example, some experiment with pre-cut shapes for a collage effect, or simultaneously adhere multiple overlapping pieces of paper under the printed image.

A more traditional paper choice would be a fine paper made from gampi fiber. Some artists experiment with non-traditional papers, using such things as newspaper, ephemera, dress patterns, and book pages as the sheet to be printed on.

== Glue ==
There is some variation in adhesives used for chine collé. Some artists are reported to use a dusting of flour right before pressing rather than paste. Some have tried using no adhesive at all, simply relying on the high pressure of the printing press and properties of the paper (fibers, sizing) to fuse the papers together similar to paper-making; however, this method may be variable and unreliable. More recently, some artists have turned to adhesives such as PVA glue or gel medium, rather than paste.

In traditional paste-making for Chine-collé, wheat or rice starch is separated from gluten and other elements of wheat or rice flour. Pure starch is then cooked with distilled water to form a congealed gel. Finally the gel is passed through a fine sieve such as a piece of silk to form the paste. Starch-based pastes are considered archival, and are sometimes used in other paper-based applications, such as book binding, book repair and collage.
