= Miss Navajo =

Annual pageant held on the Navajo Nation

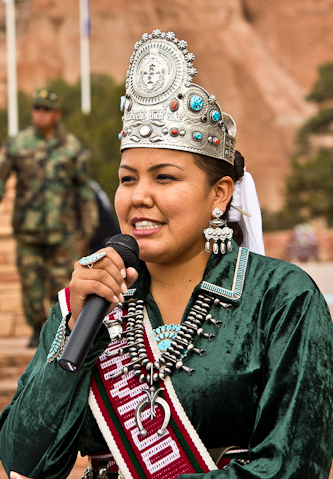
Former Miss Navajo Crystalyne Curley speaking to a crowd after her coronation in 2012.

Miss Navajo Nation (Navajo: Naabeehó bichʼeeké) is a pageant that has been held annually on the Navajo Nation, United States, since 1952.

The first Miss Navajo was Beulah Melvin Allen, in 1952. She was crowned at the Navajo Nation Fair, the largest fair held on the Navajo Nation, which had been established three years earlier.

Pageant contestants must be unmarried, over 18 years of age, be a high school graduate, and be able to speak the Navajo language. They compete in such activities as answering questions about traditional and modern Navajo customs both in Navajo and English, sheep butchering, and performing a contemporary and Navajo cultural talent.

The current Miss Navajo Nation (2024-2025) is Ranisha Begay.

== Film ==
A documentary film called Miss Navajo, directed by Billy Luther (who is Navajo, Hopi, and Laguna), was filmed in 2005 and 2006, released in 2006, and shown on the Independent Lens documentary series on PBS in 2007. Miss Navajo is a tradition that still continues today. Miss Navajo's duties as a leader are to guide and be a role model of the Navajo Nation.

== Mission statement ==
The mission statement of Miss Navajo Nation is:

"In keeping with Navajo culture and tradition, the role of Miss Navajo Nation is to exemplify the essence and characters of First Woman, White Shell Woman and Changing Woman and to display leadership as the Goodwill Ambassador. Miss Navajo Nation represents womanhood and fulfills the role of 'grandmother, mother, aunt, and sister' to the Navajo people; therefore she can speak as a leader, teacher, counselor, advisor and friend. In March 1999, the Branch Chiefs of the Navajo government agreed that tone of the fundamental principals of the Navajo government should be the preservation of the Navajo culture. It shall be the mission of the Office of Miss Navajo Nation to encourage every Navajo to assist in the preservation of Navajo culture and Miss Navajo Nation will represent the importance of Navajo women with respect and honor."

== Miss Navajo Nation Title Holders ==
Dates are the year the title was awarded, not the year it was conceded to the following contestant.

| Year | Image | Winner |
|---|---|---|
| 1952 | | Beulah Melvin Allen |
| 1953 | | Ida Gail Organick |
| 1954 | | Charlotte Lawrence Greenstone |
| 1955 | | Charlotte Lawrence Greenstone |
| 1956 | | Charlotte Lawrence Greenstone (after this a limit-one rule was instituted) |
| 1957 | | Emma Louise Anderson and Geraldine Morgan Pete |
| 1958 | | Dorothy Curtis Fixico and Vivian Linda Arviso |
| 1959 | | Elsie Curley Raymond and Joy Jean Sells Hanley |
| 1960 | | Bernice Skeet and Roseanne Kellywood Bahe |
| 1961 | | Lois Haskie Kansaswood and Alyse Neundorf |
| 1962 | | Rowena Yazzie McCabe and Emma Joe |
| 1963 | | Anna Mae Begay Fowler |
| 1964 | | Sally Ann Zah Joe |
| 1965 | | Carol Ann Yazzie Showalter |
| 1966 | | Sarah Ann Johnson Luther |
| 1967 | | Thelma Pablo Francisco |
| 1968 | | Rose McCabe Wauneka |
| 1969 | | Rose Ann Bekis Kenneth |
| 1970 | | Linda Hanove Schweigman |
| 1971 | | Genevieve Lee Salt |
| 1972 | | Janet Yazzie Caller |
| 1973 | | Delphine Curley Ludlum |
| 1974 | | Gilene Begay |
| 1975 | | Angela Barney Nez |
| 1976 | | Rosita Tsosie Holiday |
| 1977 | | Marilyn Help-Hood |
| 1978 | | Bobby Bia |
| 1979 | | Freda Jeli Nells |
| 1980 | | Sandra Eriacho |
| 1981 | | Dolly Manson |
| 1982 | | Sunny Dooley |
| 1983 | | Shirley Paulson |
| 1984 | | Lorene Lewis |
| 1985 | | Audra Arviso |
| 1986 | | Diane Taylor |
| 1987 | | Wena Jesus |
| 1988 | | Sophina Shorty |
| 1989 | | Geraldine Gamble |
| 1990 | | Jennifer Jackson-Wheeler |
| 1991 | | Sharon Watson Murray |
| 1992 | | Tina James-Tafoya |
| 1993 | | Tara Tsosie |
| 1994 | | Karen Leuppe |
| 1995 | | Audra J. Etsitty Platero |
| 1996 | | Josephine Ann Tracey |
| 1997 | | Radmilla A. Cody |
| 1998 | | Sevaleah Begay-Tsosie |
| 1999 | | Victoria Yazzie |
| 2000 | | Karletta Chief |
| 2001 | | Jolyana Begay-Kroupa |
| 2002 | | Shaunda Tsosie |
| 2003 | | Marla Billey |
| 2004 | | Jannalee Atcitty |
| 2005 | | Rachelle James |
| 2006 | | Jocelyn Billy |
| 2007 | | Jonathea Tso |
| 2008 | | Yolanda Charley |
| 2009 | | Tashina Nelson |
| 2010 | | Winifred Bessie Jumbo |
| 2011 | | Crystalyne Curley |
| 2012 | | Leandra Thomas |
| 2013 | | Natasha Hardy |
| 2014 | | Alyson Jeri Shirley |
| 2015 | | McKeon Kova Dempsey |
| 2016 | | Ronda Joe |
| 2017 | | Crystal Littleben |
| 2018 | | Autumn Montoya |
| 2019 | | Shaandiin Parrish |
| 2020 | | Not held due to COVID pandemic |
| 2021 | | Niagara A. C. Rockbridge |
| 2022 | | Valentina P. N. Clitso |
| 2023 | | Amy Naazbah Reeves-Begaye |
| 2024 | | Ranisha Chrislyn Begay |
| 2025 | | Camille Uentillie |

== See also ==
- List of beauty pageants
