= Black Creek (Arizona) =

Water body in Apache County, AZ, and McKinley County, NM

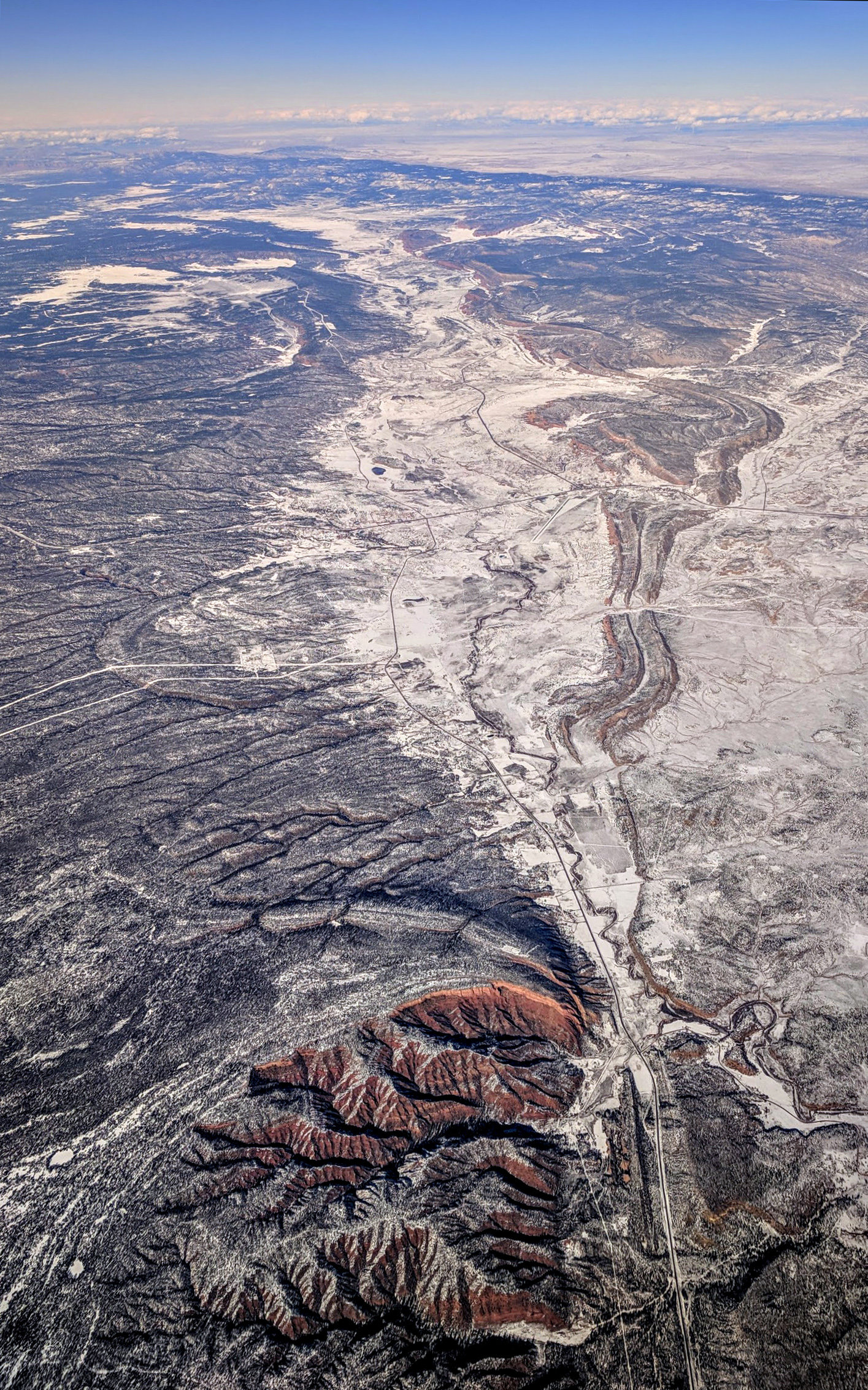
- Aerial view with Black Creek flowing south through St. Michaels near the Window Rock Airport, near the top in the snowy area, through Hunters Point, near the bottom, along Indian Route 12

Location
- Country: United States

Physical characteristics
- Source
  - location: Defiance Plateau, Arizona; Chuska Mountains & Manuelito Plateau, New Mexico
- Mouth
  - location: Houck, Arizona, confluence with Puerco River
  - elevation: 6,035 ft (1,839 m)

Basin features
- Progression: Puerco—Little Colorado

Black Creek of Arizona is a 55-mi (89 km) long north tributary of the Puerco River, in northeast Arizona and northwest New Mexico.

The Black Creek flows south along an east and southeast perimeter section of the Defiance Plateau; Red Lake (Arizona–New Mexico), 7,150 feet (2,179 m) (at Navajo, New Mexico), lies in Red Valley near the origin of Black Creek, and other watercourses meeting at Red Lake. Red Lake is located at the north of the river valley, Black Creek Valley, which extends south to Window Rock, Arizona.

Fort Defiance, Arizona, is at a northwest section of Black Creek. Other sources of the creek are from the east in New Mexico. The Chuska Mountains, of Arizona and New Mexico, trend southeasterly, (in the south) and form the east border of Black Creek Valley; an extension south from the Chuskas, the Manuelito Plateau, forms the east border, from Red Lake south, to just east of Fort Defiance.

Black Creek continues south, and south of Window Rock the Black Creek Valley ends south of St. Michaels, Arizona. Approximately 6-mi south of St. Michaels, the smaller Oak Springs Valley begins. Black Creek exits the valley southwest, through a 4-mi long canyon to enter a due-south flowing stretch to Houck, Arizona, and its confluence with the Puerco River.

Black Creek and Black Creek Valley are mostly due-north, south trending, paralleling the New Mexico border; only a small section of Black Creek actually courses in New Mexico, south of Red Lake. The origin of the Puerco River, on the other hand, is east of Gallup, New Mexico, at the Continental Divide south of Crownpoint, New Mexico.

== Location ==
Mouth
Confluence with the Puerco River, Apache County, Arizona (on the Navajo Nation): 35°16′00″N 109°14′02″W
Source
McKinley County, New Mexico (on the Navajo Nation): 35°54′55″N 109°01′50″W

== Access routes and townsites ==
List of townsites/roadways/etc. (south of Window Rock)

West

- (Window Rock, Arizona)
- Arizona State Route 264
  - St. Michaels, Arizona
- –
- –
- IR-123
- Hunters Point, Arizona
- –
- Oak Springs, Arizona
  - IR-28 & IR-124
- –
- (Black Creek exits southwesterly)
  - South

East

- Window Rock, Arizona
  - Tse Bonito, New Mexico (on NM-264)
- AZ-264 & New Mexico State Road 264
- –
- IR-123
- –
- –
- –

IR-124

- –

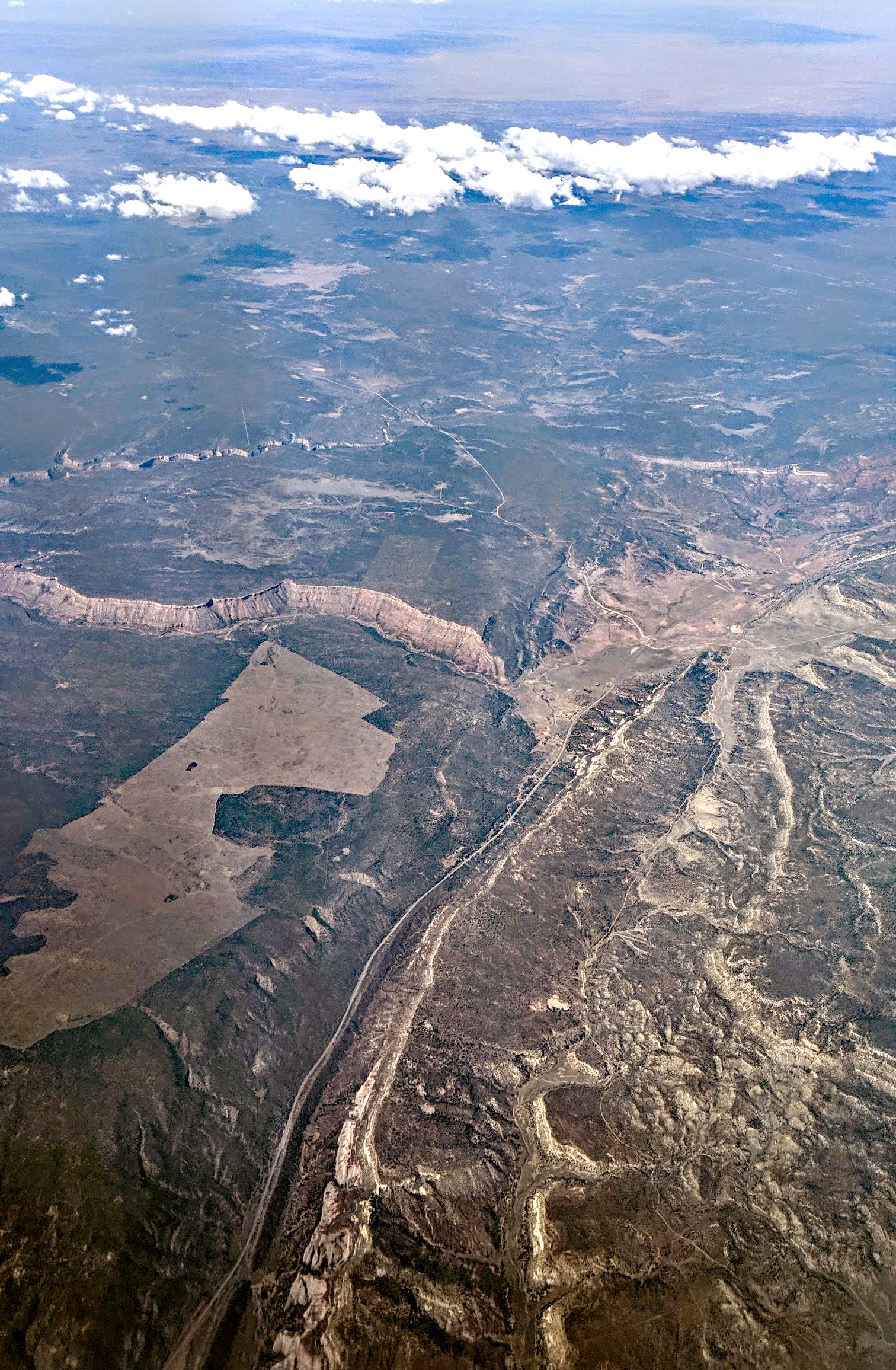
Just south of Hunters Point, Black Creek flows through Oak Springs, Arizona, and Oak Spring Canyon, out at left center. Indian Route 12 is at center foreground and runs through Oak Springs toward Hunters Point at upper right.

The townsites north of Window Rock are Fort Defiance and Navajo. Sawmill, Arizona, on Indian Route 7 (IR-7) from Fort Defiance, lies northwest on the Defiance Plateau, which formerly had an operational sawmill industry. The Black Creek and rivercourse Black Creek Valley is traversed by the north–south IR-12. South of Oak Springs, Arizona, IR-12 traverses south-southeasterly out of Oak Springs Valley to Interstate 40, about 8-mi distant.

At Window Rock, IR-12 traverses due-north at the east bank of Black Creek. At Fort Defiance, (west side of river, 5-mi north), IR-12 enters New Mexico to reach Navajo, New Mexico, at the southeast corner of Red Lake. IR-12 becomes New Mexico State Road 134 and turns northeast to meet a north-traversing stretch of U.S. Route 491 in New Mexico.

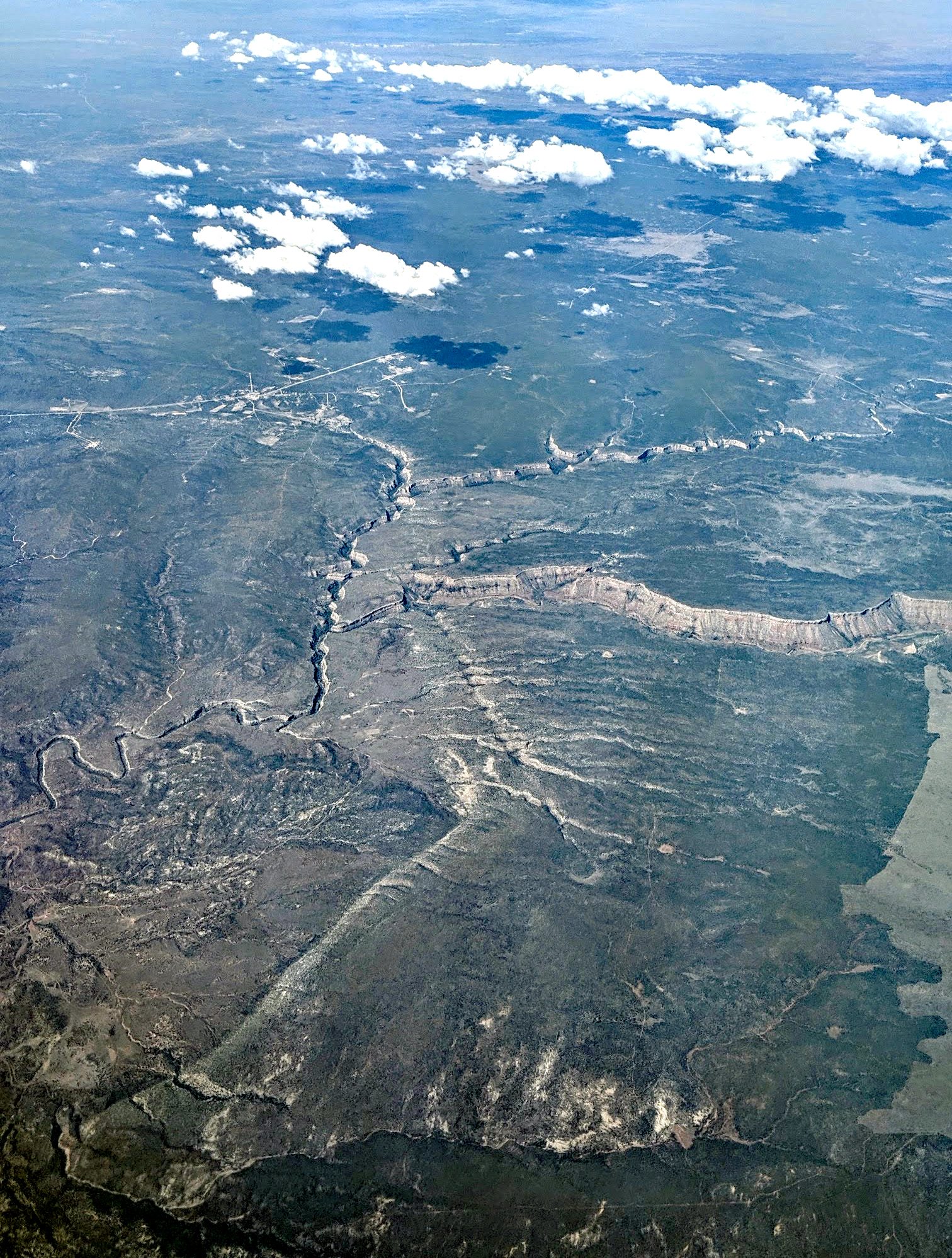
Black Creek enters from Oak Spring Canyon, right center, and exits at lower left toward its confluence with the Puerco River at Houck, Arizona. The West Fork Black Creek joins from above and right, with a minor tributary from Pine Springs, Arizona, upper left.

== See also ==
- List of rivers of Arizona
- List of rivers of New Mexico
- List of tributaries of the Colorado River
