= Defiance Plateau =

- Region
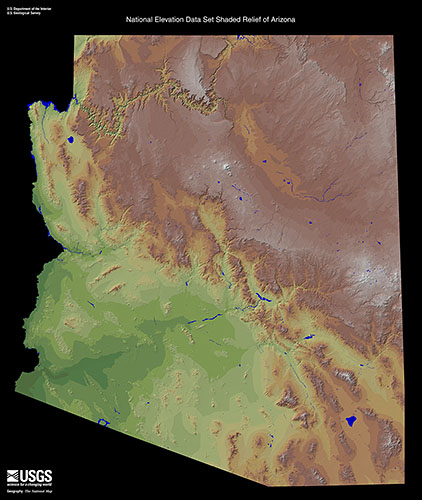
- Defiance Plateau, south of Chinle Valley, and east-northeast of Painted Desert – (light tan & arc-shaped) (Puerco River & valley, from New Mexico attached at southeast of desert) (see 3rd, watershed map)

- Defiance Plateau (at Sawmill, AZ) of Arizona and New Mexico
- Coordinates: 35°53′48″N 109°09′31″W
- Country: United States
- States: Arizona; New Mexico
- Regions: Painted Desert, (southeast) – Colorado Plateau & Navajo Nation
- Counties: Apache

The Defiance Plateau, part of the geologic Defiance Uplift, is an approximately 75-mile (121 km) long, mostly north-trending plateau of Apache County, Arizona, with its east and southeast perimeter, as parts of San Juan and McKinley Counties, New Mexico.

The west and southwest of the plateau region borders the east, southeast of the Painted Desert, where the Puerco River enters the desert, flowing southwest from New Mexico then meeting the Little Colorado River which flows northwest through the Painted Desert – (light tan & arc-shaped), to the Colorado River (at the northeast of the Grand Canyon). The Puerco River is the plateau's border on the south and southeast; at the northwest, the Black Mesa is the northwest border, and the north of the Defiance Plateau is bounded by the south of the Chinle Valley, where Chinle Creek flows north to meet the San Juan River in southeast Utah.

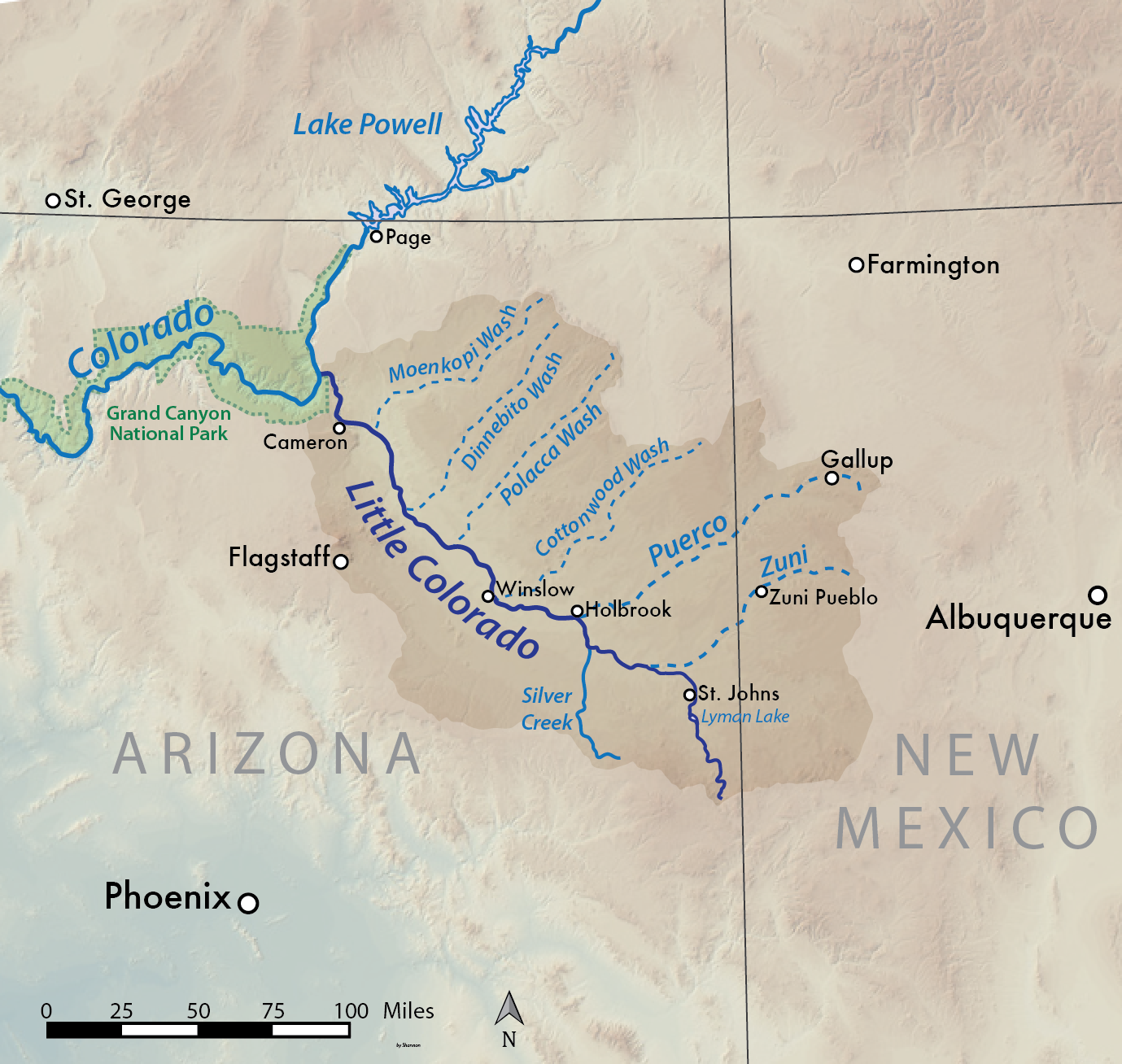
Map of Little Colorado River watershed. (shows approximate location of Painted Desert and to the northeast, Defiance Plateau)

The north terminus region of the Defiance Plateau contains three canyons, with watercourses flowing due-west, as headwaters of Chinle Creek. The canyons are the Canyon de Chelly National Monument; two other canyons are southwest, part of the five canyon system, Little White House and Three Turkey Canyons.

The Defiance Plateau is part of the Navajo Nation. At the plateau's southeast, on Black Creek lies the site of Window Rock, Arizona, the Navajo Nation capitol.

The highpoint of the plateau is Fluted Rock, southwest of Sawmill, Arizona, 8,304 feet (2,531 m).

== Description ==
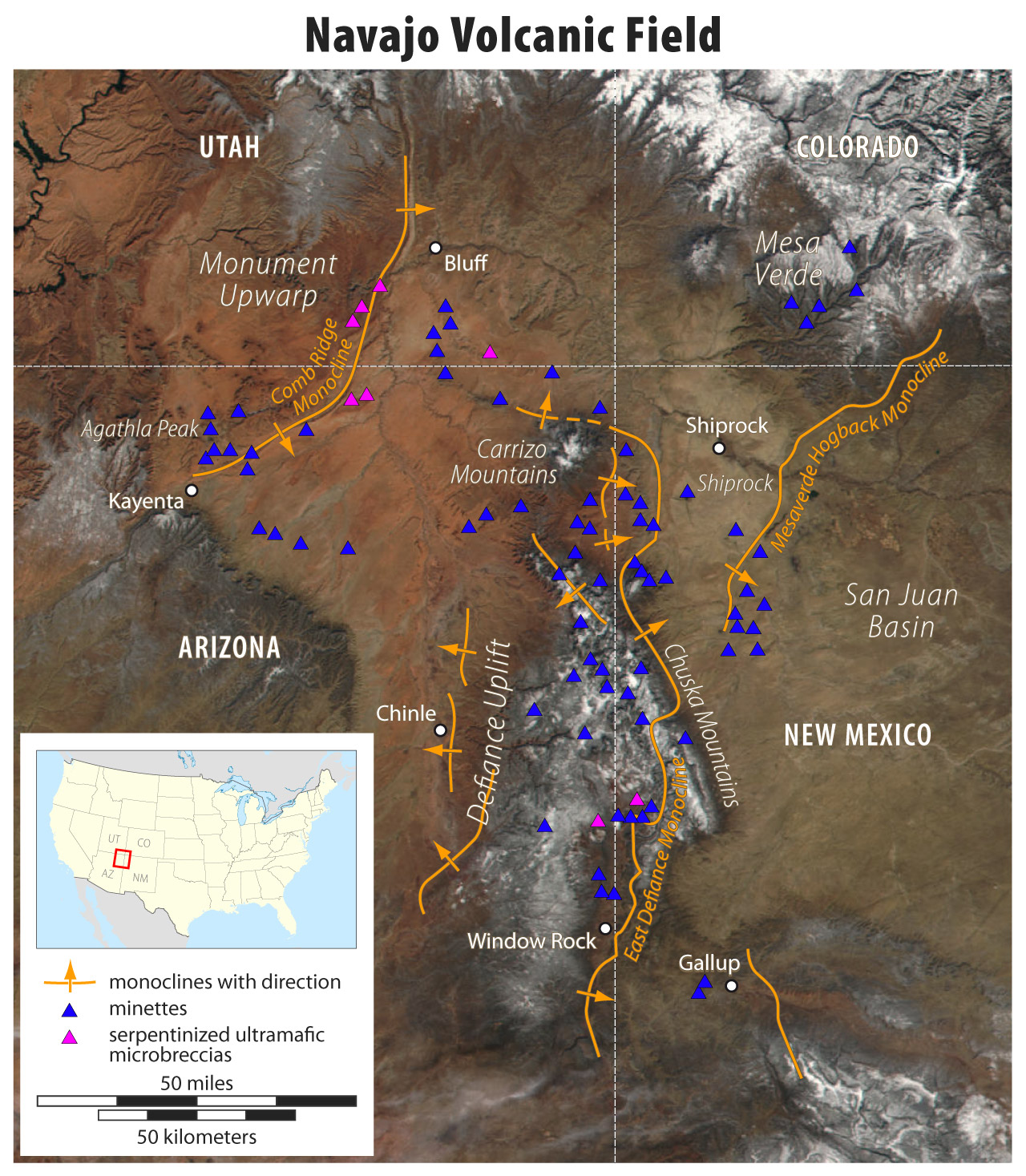
Regional area surrounding the Defiance Plateau/Defiance Uplift.

The Defiance Plateau is the central area of an uplifted region. To the north/northeast are the Lukachukai Mountains, part of the Defiance Plateau border; they form a southeast section of Chinle Valley's border. South of the Lukachukais is the rest of the east border of the Defiance Plateau, the Chuska Mountains; the Chuskas trend northwest in the north; at the plateaus east, the Chuskas trend more southerly, and attached at the south is Manuelito Plateau, in New Mexico, the east border of the south-flowing Black Creek at the southeast perimeter region of the Defiance Plateau.

=== South and southwest ===
The south perimeter of the Defiance Plateau is bordered by the Puerco River, flowing southwest from the Continental Divide in northwest New Mexico. The Puerco intersects the Little Colorado River at the southeast edge of the Painted Desert, where the Little Colorado runs directly northwest (then due-north, and then back to northwest) to eventually meet the Colorado River. Numerous mesas trend from the northeast (west and southwest sides of the Black Mesa) as drainage basin perimeters feeding the Little Colorado. At the southwest of the Defiance Plateau, is Padre Mesa; north is Ganada Mesa, (Ganado, Arizona), and northeast of Grand Mesa is Oak Creek Mountain, where the plateau highpoint is located, Fluted Rock, 4-mi southwest of Sawmill, Arizona.

=== North and northwest ===
The northwest of the Defiance Plateau merges into the southeast of the Black Mesa, (southeast-trending, the same trendline as the Painted Desert). Black Mesa is also the west border of Chinle Valley, where the south-center, and southeast of the valley becomes part of the north perimeter of the plateau. Northeast and east are the mountain ranges that trend southward, and become the eastern parts of the Defiance Plateau. The Carrizo Mountains stand alone northeast; the Lukachukai Mountains are connected to the north Chuskas, and the extensive Chuska Mountains are attached to the Defiance Plateau at the east, with headwaters flowing west, or northwest into Canyon de Chelly or southeast Chinle Valley. In the south Chuskas, the Black Creek, and Red Lake, at the Red Valley region, southeast of Sawmill, form the final southeast perimeter region of the Defiance Plateau.

=== Plateau center region ===
The center region is near Sawmill, Arizona. Beautiful Valley to the northwest contains Nazlini Wash, where the wash is a southwest-tributary to the due-north flowing Chinle Creek system. The watershed origins also come from the southwest near Ganado, closer to the southwest Defiance Plateau perimeter. At Sawmill, northeast of Ganado is Bonito Canyon a northwest tributary to south-flowing Black Creek. The water divide separating the Chinle Creek watershed, (southeast, with Canyon de Chelly), is 3-mi north-northeast of Sawmill.

== Geology ==
The Defiance Plateau is the topographic expression of the Defiance Uplift, a block of the Earth's crust that has been repeatedly elevated through geologic time. The uplift is asymmetric, dipping steeply into the Defiance monocline on its eastern boundary but gently (with dip angles typically less than three degrees) to the west. The uplift is relatively unfaulted, except for local faulting at Tsaile graben in the northwestern part of the uplift and the Wide Ruins fault zone across the southern part of the uplift. The uplift is separated from the Zuni uplift by the Gallup sag.

The central part of the uplift exposes Permian beds (Supai Group and Coconino Sandstone) while the outer portions of the uplift, particularly to the north, expose Triassic Chinle Formation. Strata as young as the Cretaceous Mesaverde Group are found around the flanks of the uplift, particularly on the Defiance monocline. The Permian beds rest unconformably on Proterozoic gneiss and granite, showing that the uplift existed in the Pennsylvanian and was stripped of sedimentary cover by erosion. The uplift was subsequently buried by sediments during the Mesozoic but was again uplifted and partially stripped in the late Jurassic or early Cretaceous, possibly contributing significant sediments to the Morrison, Dakota, or Cedar Mountain Formations.

== Access to the region ==
US 191 traverses mesas on the west perimeter of the Defiance Plateau, from Interstate 40 on the south and southeast plateau perimeter, following the course of the Puerco River from New Mexico. At the plateaus southeast, IR-12-(BIA-12) traverses north from I-40 to follow the Black Creek rivercourse, in Arizona. At the north, IR-12 meets Red Lake (Arizona - New Mexico) and Navajo, NM in Red Valley; IR-12 then traverses northeast, intersecting with New Mexico Road 134 through the Chuska Mountains, turning east to meet U.S. 491.

IR-12, exits from NM 134 going north then northeast following the west flank of the Chuskas to meet US 191 north of Canyon de Chelly in the Chinle Valley-(at Lukachukai Creek, eventually reaching Round Rock, Arizona).

The center-south of the Defiance Plateau is traversed east–west by Arizona State Route 264. Window Rock is at the southeast, on Black Creek, (southern Chuskas, Manuelito Plateau); Ganado, Arizona is in the center-southwest plateau region, where the mesas trend northwesterly along the northeast perimeter of the Painted Desert. The west terminus of AZ 264 is Tuba City, Arizona adjacent U.S. 89.

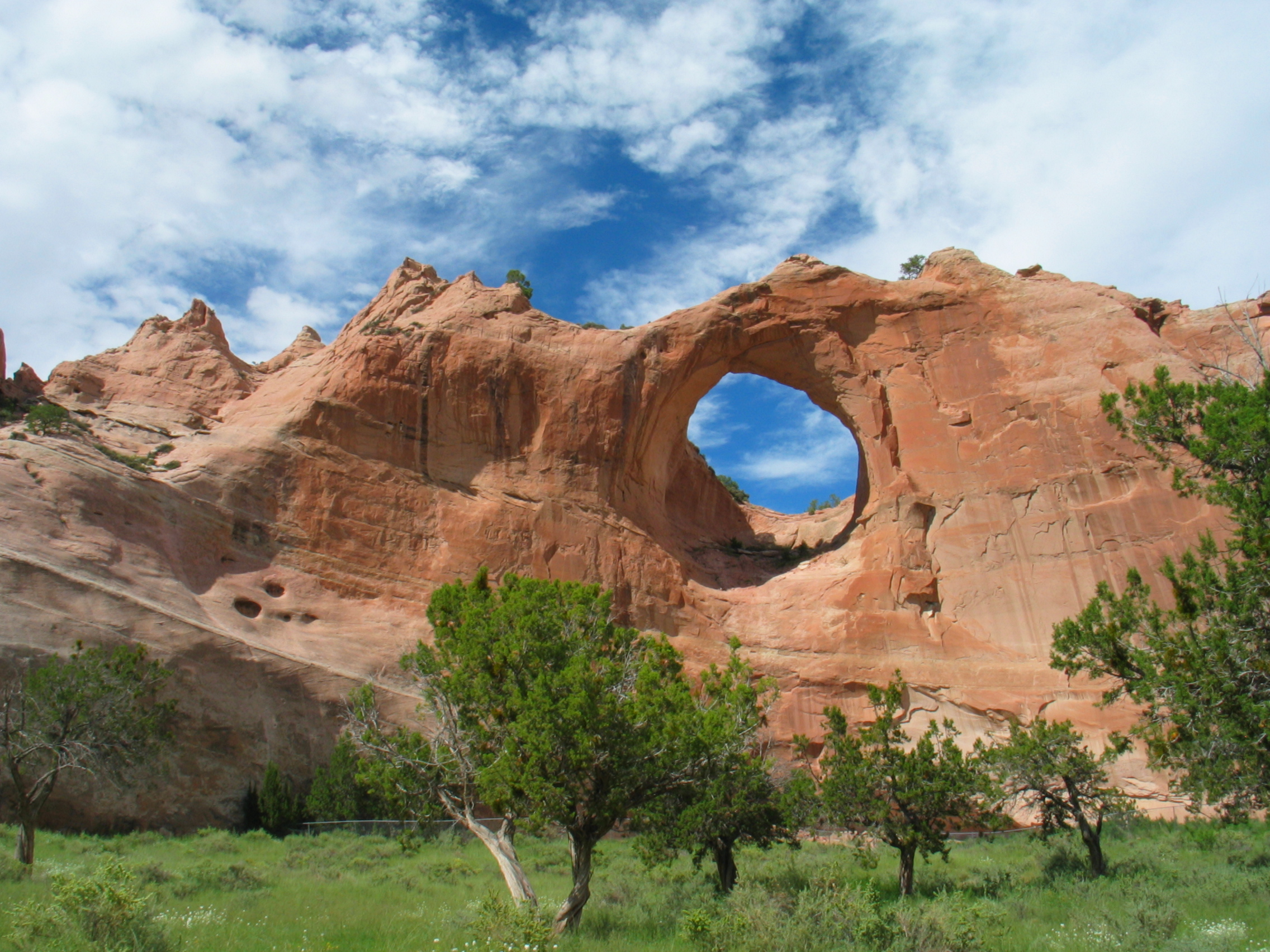
Window Rock (landform)
at Window Rock, Arizona

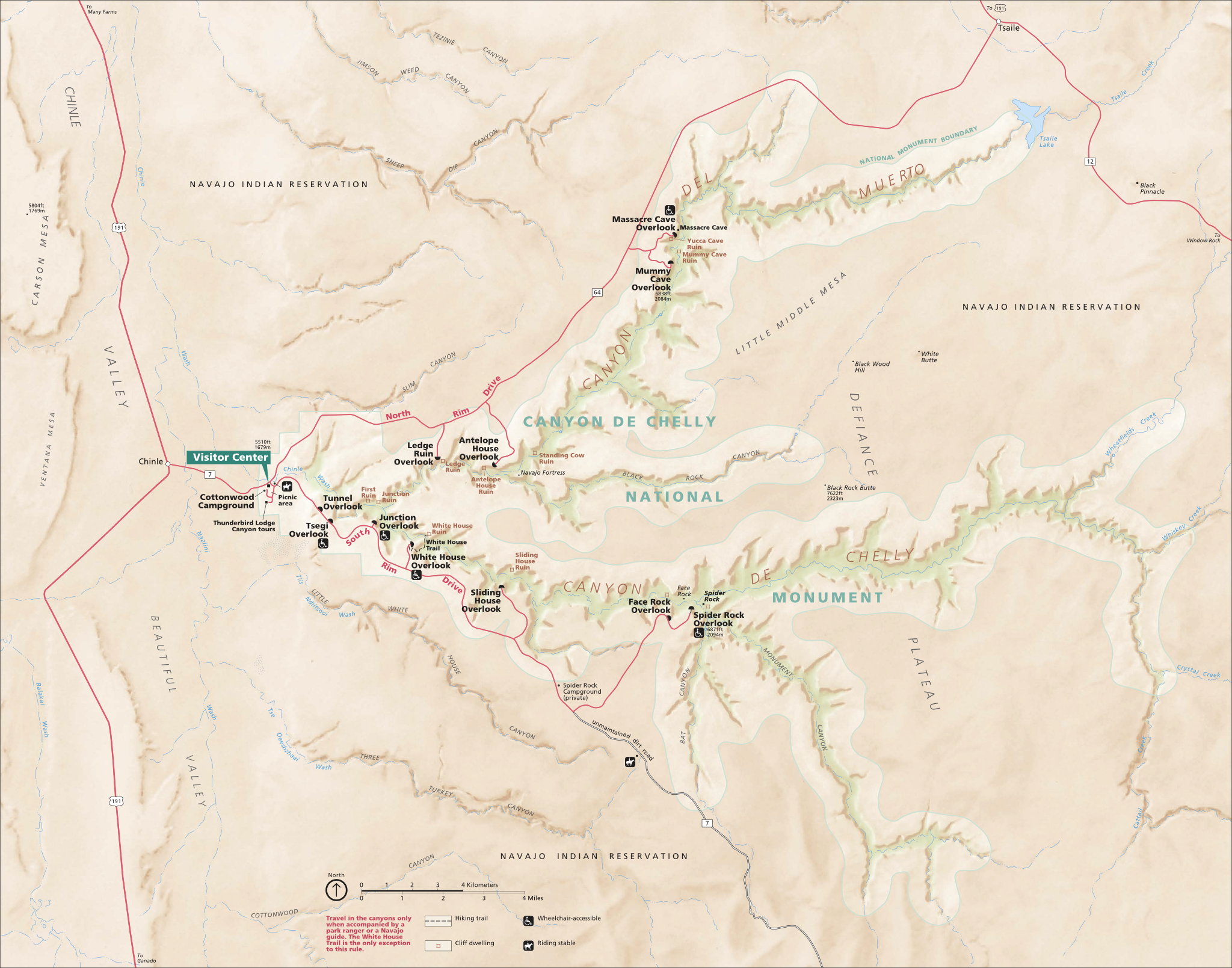
Canyon de Chelly National Monument canyons, and the additional 2 canyons at southwest

== See also ==
- Bidahochi Formation
