= Hunters Point, Arizona =

Unincorporated community in the state of Arizona, United States

- Unincorporated community
- Location within Arizona Location within the United States
- Coordinates: 35°32′52″N 109°06′18″W
- Country: United States
- State: Arizona
- County: Apache
- Elevation: 6,699 ft (2,042 m)
- Time zone: UTC-7 (Mountain (MST))
  - Summer (DST): UTC-6 (MDT)
- Area code: 928
- GNIS feature ID: 25266

Hunters Point is an unincorporated community in Apache County, Arizona, United States. Hunters Point is 9 miles (14 km) south-southwest of Window Rock. Hunters Point is located at the south of Black Creek Valley, adjacent south-flowing Black Creek, a north tributary to the southwest-flowing Puerco River.

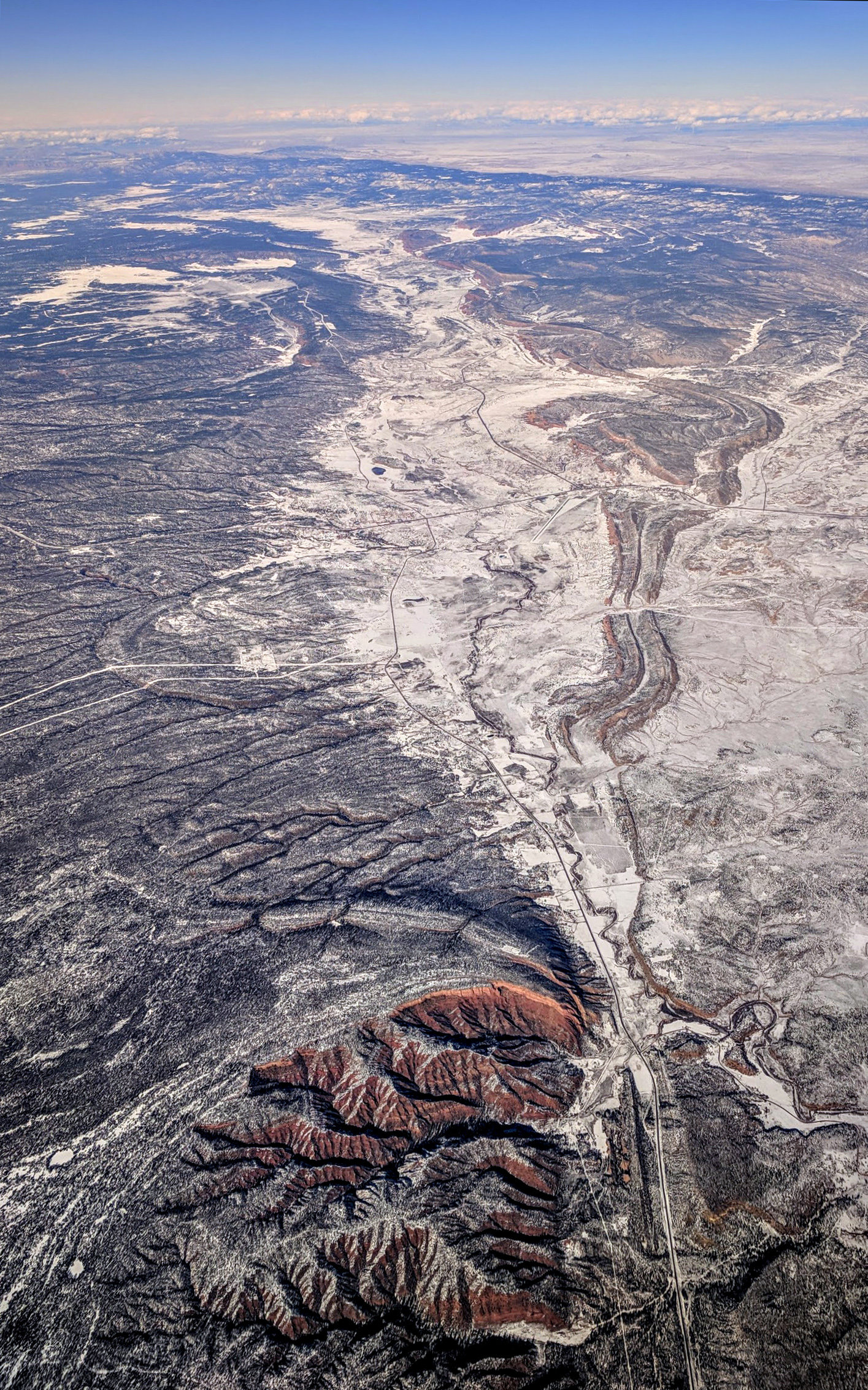
Aerial view, from the south, along the Arizona–New Mexico border, with Hunters Point near the bottom and Window Rock, Arizona, near the top in the snowy area, connected by Indian Route 12 and Black Creek.
