= Red Lake (Arizona–New Mexico) =

Waterbody

- Location within Arizona Location within New Mexico Location within the United States
- Location: Navajo Nation-(Northeast Arizona); Apache County, Arizona / McKinley County, New Mexico, Southwestern United States
- Coordinates: 35°55′47″N 109°2′25″W
- Primary inflows: Black Creek
- Primary outflows: Black Creek
- Basin countries: United States
- Max. length: 4.81 km (2.99 mi)
- Max. width: 2.7 km (1.7 mi)
- Surface area: 611 acres (247 ha)
- Max. depth: 5 ft (1.5 m)
- Surface elevation: 7,150 ft (2,180 m)

Red Lake is a lake located next to Navajo, New Mexico, in the Red Valley in McKinley County, New Mexico, and Apache County, Arizona. The lake has a surface elevation of 7,150 ft (2,180 m). Navajo, New Mexico, lies on the southeast corner of the lake.

== Description ==
Red Lake is a small lake, only 3 miles (5 km) long, and only half as wide. It is mostly north–south and is bordered on the east by Reservation Route 12, a north stretch from Window Rock, Arizona to Navajo, New Mexico.

Red Lake is located on the eastern border of the long north–south Defiance Plateau, where Canyon de Chelly comprises its north, and the Chuska Mountains border to the northeast. Only the western fourth of the lake is in Arizona, and Red Lake is on the southwest foothills of the Chuskas with the beginning of Black Creek and other creeks and washes as inflows to the lake. From Red Lake, Black Creek flows due south on the central and southeast border of the Defiance Plateau. The north–south stretch of Black Creek, in Arizona, parallels the western border of New Mexico.

Black Creek then turns southwest to meet the Puerco River, just southeast of Houck, southwest of Allentown, both on Interstate 40. The interstate follows the north side of the Puerco River in this stretch.
