= Wood Springs 2 Fire =

2020 wildfire in Arizona, USA

- Part of the 2020 Arizona wildfires
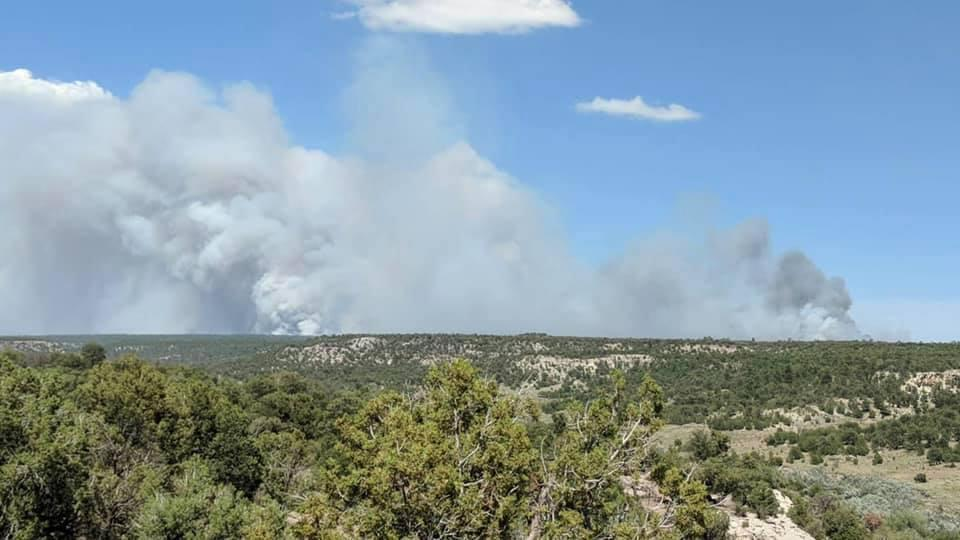
- The Wood Springs 2 Fire on June 30, 2020
- Date: June 27, 2020–
- Location: Wood Springs, Apache County, Arizona, United States
- Coordinates: 35.835°N 109.386°W

Statistics
- Burned area: 12,861 acres (5,205 ha)

Impacts
- Structures lost: 5

Ignition
- Cause: Lightning strike

Map
- Location in Arizona

The Wood Springs 2 Fire was a wildfire in the Navajo Nation, 3 miles (4.8 km) east of Wood Springs in Apache County, Arizona in the United States. The result of a lightning strike, the fire was first reported on June 27, 2020. The fire burned a total of 12,861 acres (5,205 ha) and was 98 percent contained as of July 13, 2020. Two outbuildings and five livestock pens were destroyed. One residence was damaged. The fire threatened the area around Fluted Rock, Arizona.

== Events ==
=== June ===
The Wood Springs 2 Fire was first reported burning 3 miles east of Wood Springs, Arizona, on the Navajo Nation, on June 27, 2020 around 2:00 PM. Fueled by piñon-juniper and pine, the fire was started by a lightning strike. Fire crews made significant containment efforts, but, high winds caused the fire to grow. By the evening, the fire had burned 300 acres (121 ha). Air support was called in, using Winslow–Lindbergh Regional Airport for staging. Navajo Route 7 from Sawmill to Chinle and Wood Springs was closed, as was Navajo Route 26 from Nazlini and Sawmill.

On June 29, the fire had grown to 3,000 acres (1,214 ha) and residents of Fluted Rock and Sawmill were told to be ready to evacuate if asked. The fire acted "extreme" according to incident managers, with 200-foot flames forming due to 45 mile per hour wind gusts. The fire crossed Navajo Route 26 and moved northeast towards Navajo Route 7.

=== July ===
By the morning of July 1, the fire had damaged an unknown number of structures. The fire kept growing with the help of dry fuels and steep topography. Air quality, due to the smoke traveling east and northeast, was impacted in Crystal, New Mexico. Fort Defiance, Arizona, Sawmill, Arizona, and Navajo, New Mexico experienced poor air quality due to smoke.

As of the evening of July 2, 2020, the fire has burned over 10,000 acres (4,047 ha) and was five percent contained. Crews began structure assessment, reporting that one hogan sustained minor damage and two livestock pens were destroyed. On July 4, a drone was used to limit fire growth by firing ping-pong-ball-like spheres that ignite when they hit the ground, burning out potential fuels. Two more corrals and an additional building were reported as destroyed. Additionally, Navajo Nation President Jonathan Nez toured the fire by air. Nez implemented an executive order closing the area surrounding the fire from the public. On July 7, the community of Sawmill was considered no longer threatened by the fire and was taken off of high alert. The next day, an additional outbuilding and corral was reported as destroyed, bringing the total to two outbuildings and five corrals destroyed by the fire.

As of July 13, the fire had burned 12,861 acres (5,205 ha) and was 98 percent contained.

== Road closures ==
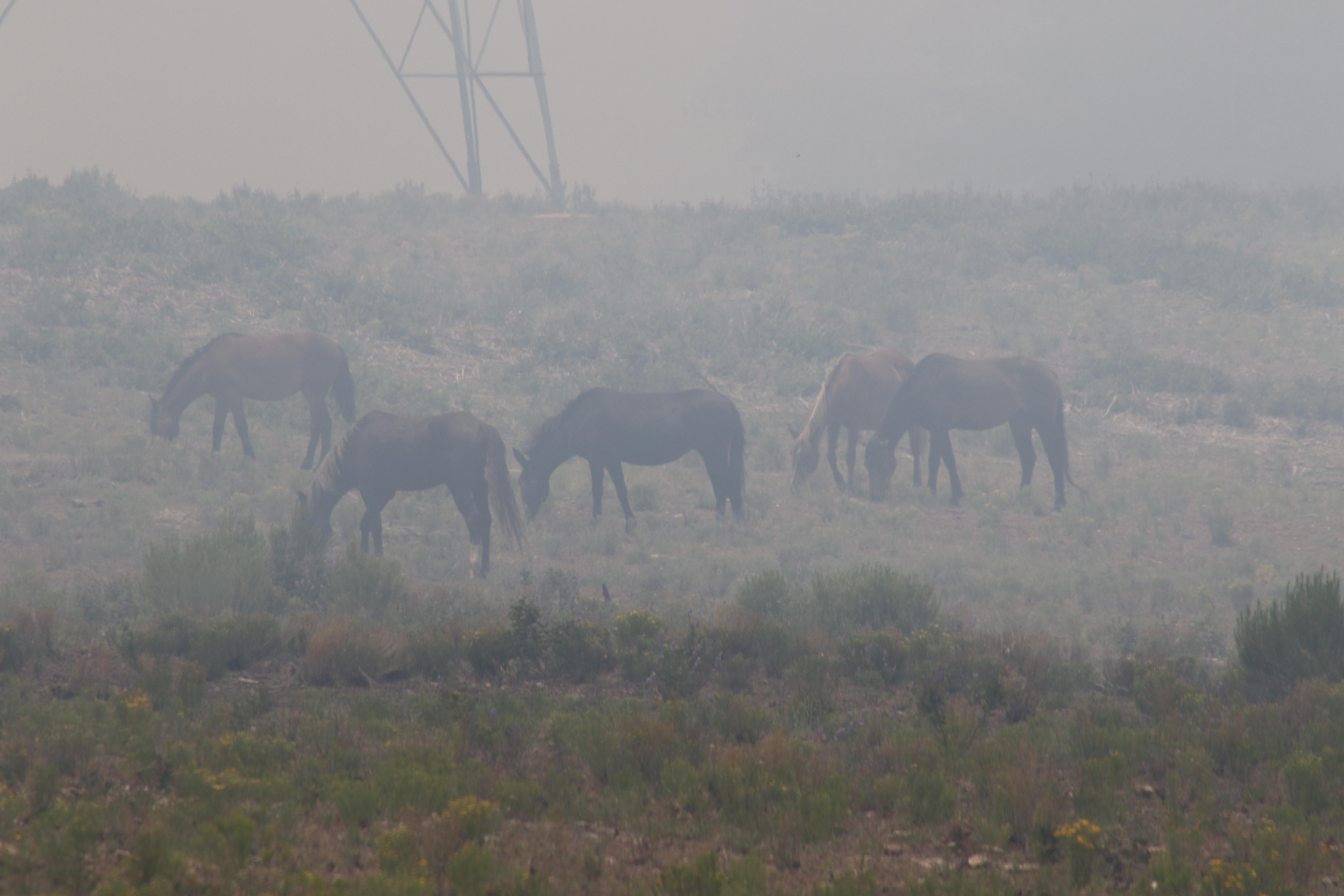
A horse corral shrouded in smoke from the fire on the Navajo Nation.

As of July 9, 2020, the following roads were closed except to residents:

- Navajo Route 7 from Sawmill to Three Turkey Ruin Junction
- N-26 from the intersection of N-27 east to Route 7

== Impact ==
The Wood Springs 2 Fire threatened communities in central Navajo Nation, specifically Fluted Rock, Kin Dah Lichíí, Nazlini, Sawmill, and Wood Springs. Some community members were asked to evacuate. The fire also threatened sheep and horse camps, and cultural and historical sites. A hogan sustained minor damage and two outbuildings and five livestock pens were destroyed.

The fire caused Navajo Route 7 (from Sawmill to Chinlee and Wood Springs) and Navajo Route 26 (from Nazlini to Sawmill) to close. Additionally,

Air quality was impacted in Sawmill, Flute Rock, Fort Defiance, Arizona, Navajo, New Mexico, and Window Rock, Arizona. Smoke was visible from Highway 264, Window Rock, Ganado, Sawmill, Nazlini, Chinle and other surrounding communities.

== Gallery ==
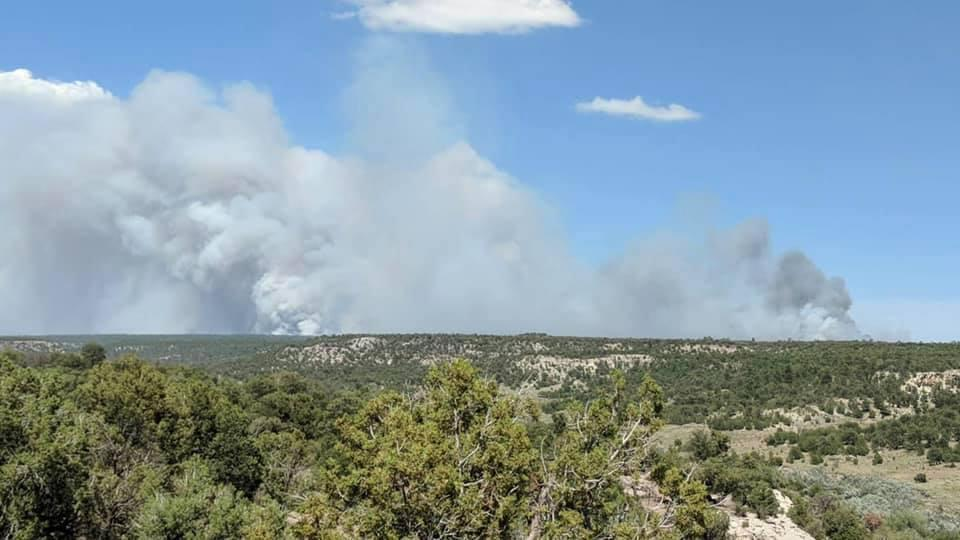
The fire on June 29, as seen from Window Rock

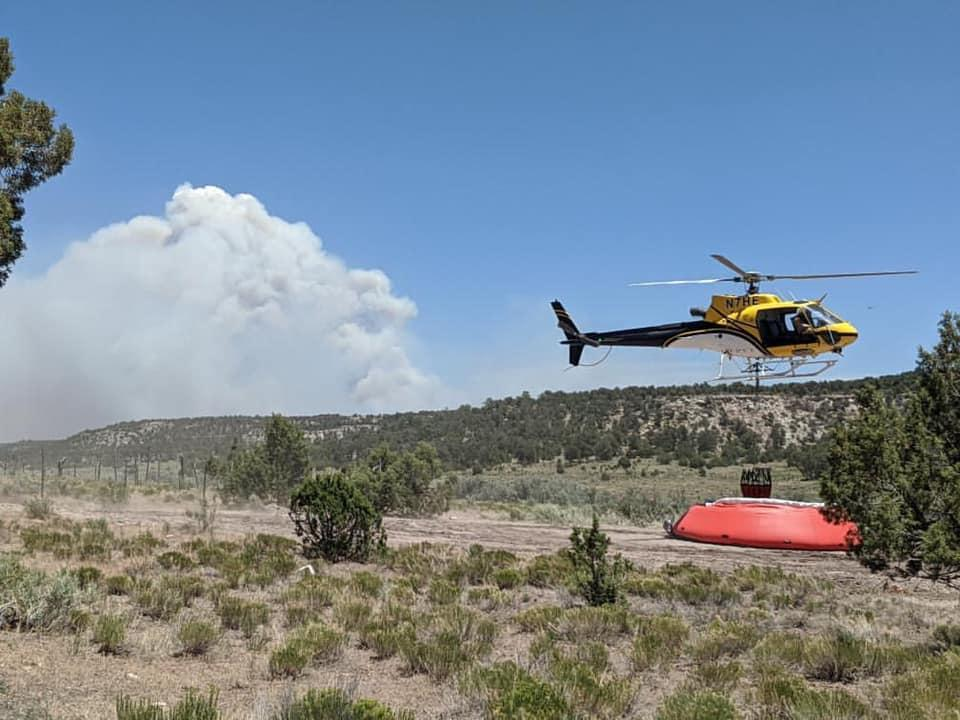
Helicopter procuring water to fight the fire on June 29

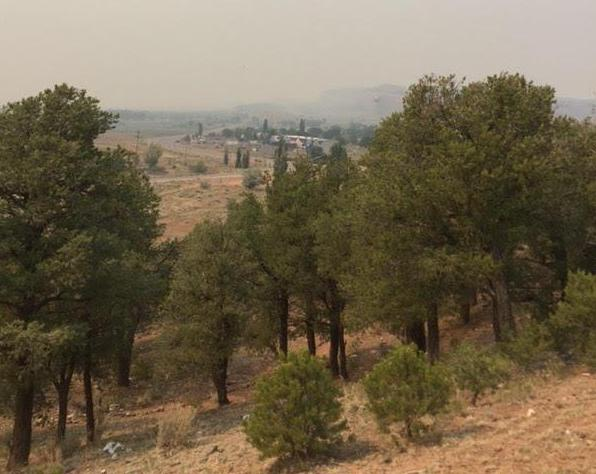
Smoke from the Wood Springs 2 Fire in Navajo, New Mexico on June 30

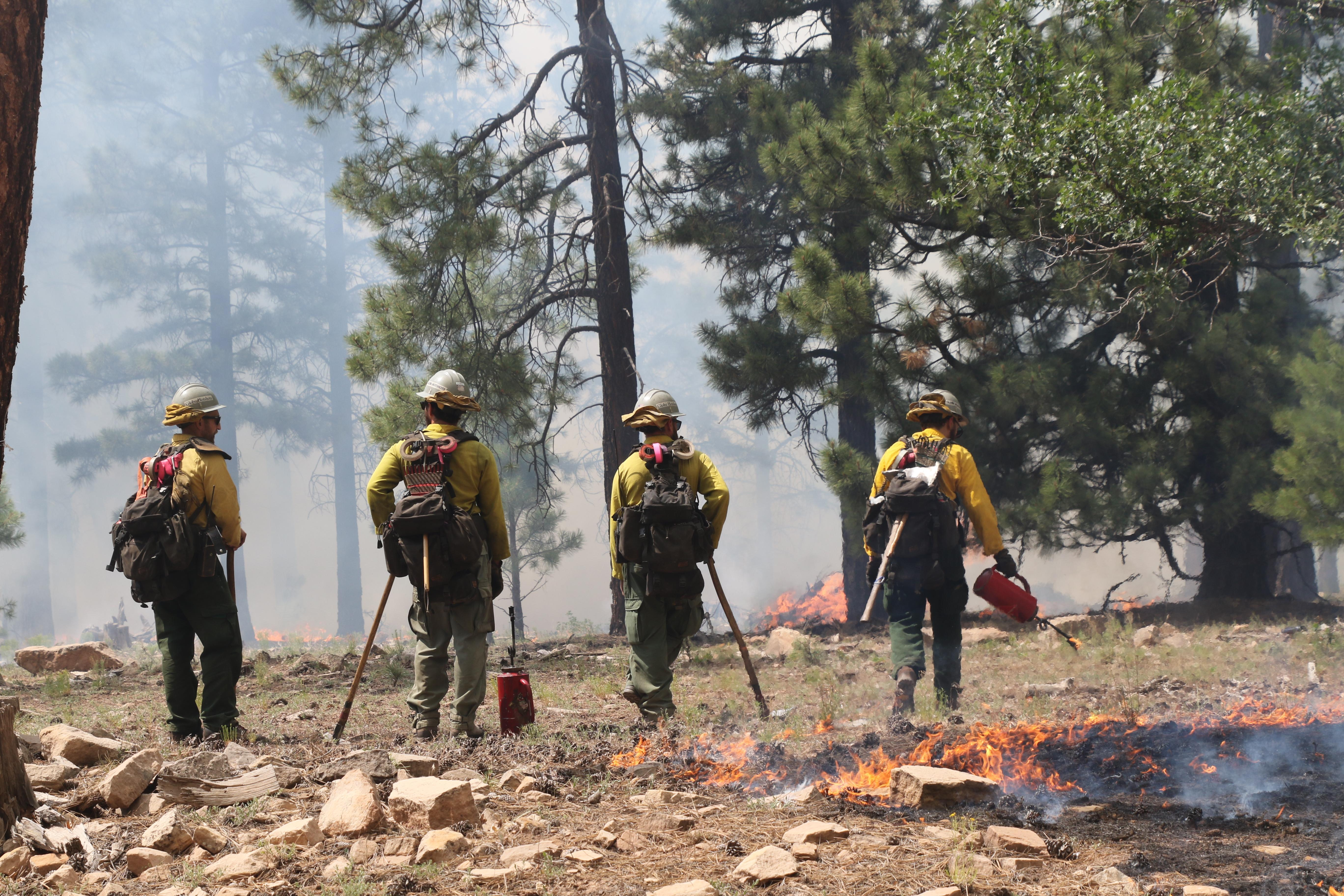
Fire crew monitor burning operations off Route 7 on July 2
