= Black Falls, Arizona =

Geographic feature on the Little Colorado River, Arizona

Coordinates: 35°34′44″N 111°17′04″W

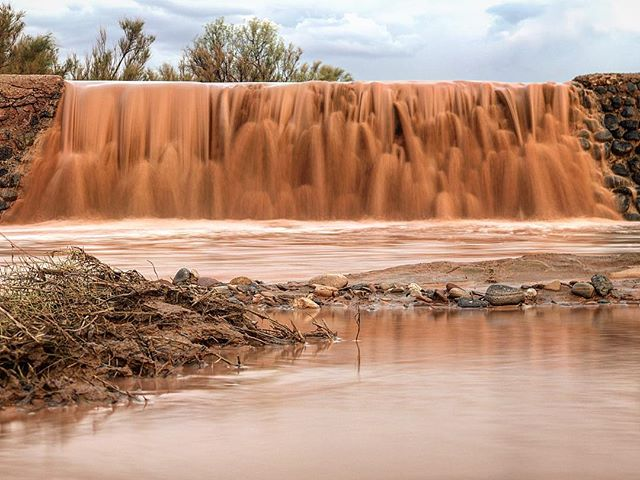
Black Falls Dam during peak flow of the Little Colorado River, built adjacent to the natural lava dam as part of an irrigation project

Black Falls is a natural basalt rock dam and significant crossing place on the Little Colorado River in Coconino County, Arizona near the Wupatki National Monument. The crossing lends its name to the sparsely populated Black Falls community of the Navajo Nation which is nearby.

== Geology ==
Around 20,000 years ago the Grand Falls Lava Flow consisting of alkali olivine basalt proceeded along the Little Colorado River bed from a vent near Merriam crater. At Black Falls Crossing the lava flow has blocked the river channel so that when the river is flowing a ten-foot high waterfall is formed. At other times the rock is completely covered by sand.

=== Uranium mining ===
The Navajo people have been affected by uranium mining in the area. There are a large number of abandoned uranium mines to the north and east of the crossing. In 2007 the Navajo People of the Black Falls community were awarded an Environmental Justice Grant by the EPA due to uranium pollution of drinking water wells.

== History ==
Black Falls Crossing has long been a significant crossing place. It was on the major Hopi trail from villages to the San Francisco Peaks, was the turning point of the Sitgreaves Expedition and rest stop on the Mormon Trail.

In 1940 Black Falls Irrigation Project was commenced by the Bureau of Indian Affairs and Civilian Conservation Corps to improve farming prospects in the area. Black Falls Dam was built adjacent to the crossing in an attempt to divert water to an irrigation system. The project was abandoned in 1942 due to a lack of funds, leaving the dam in place.

=== Black Falls Trading Post ===
In 1941 Black Falls Trading Post was established by Emmett Kellam on the south-west side of the river to trade with Navajos camped on the north side working for the irrigation project. After the project ceased the trading post continued to serve the Navajo living in the area, and became one of the most important locations for local Navajo trading activity through the 1940s and fifties. A 1943 land transfer had made the post part of the Wupatki National Monument, and it consequently served as a centre for social activities and meetings. The post was demolished in 1964.

== See also ==
- Grand Falls, Arizona
