= Navajo, New Mexico =

Census-designated place in McKinley County, New Mexico, United States

- Census-designated place
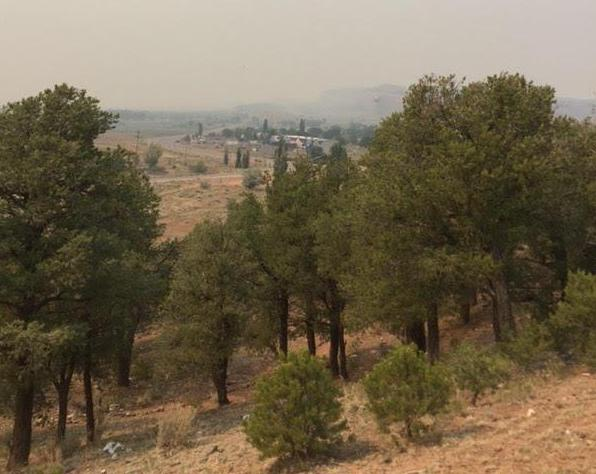
- The Wood Springs 2 Fire visible from Navajo on June 30, 2020

- Location in McKinley County and the state of New Mexico

- Location in the United States
- Coordinates: 35°54′09″N 109°01′56″W
- Country: United States
- State: New Mexico
- County: McKinley

Area
  - Total: 2.25 sq mi (5.83 km^{2})
  - Land: 2.25 sq mi (5.83 km^{2})
  - Water: 0 sq mi (0.00 km^{2})
- Elevation: 7,146 ft (2,178 m)

Population (2020)
  - Total: 1,942
  - Density: 862.0/sq mi (332.82/km^{2})
- Time zone: UTC-7 (Mountain (MST))
  - Summer (DST): UTC-6 (MDT)
- ZIP code: 87328
- Area code: 505
- FIPS code: 35-51420
- GNIS feature ID: 2408904

Navajo is an unincorporated community and census-designated place (CDP) on the Navajo Nation in McKinley County, New Mexico, United States. The population was 1,942 as of the 2020 census, up from 1,645 in 2010.

== Geography ==
The community is in northwestern McKinley County, on the east side of the valley of Black Creek. Its southwestern corner is bordered to the west by Apache County, Arizona. The community is served by Navajo Routes 12 and 31. Route 12 leads south 12 miles (19 km) to Fort Defiance, Arizona, and north 6 miles (10 km) to New Mexico State Road 134 in Crystal, while Route 31 leads east into the Chuska Mountains.

According to the U.S. Census Bureau, the Navajo CDP has a total area of 2.25 square miles (5.8 km^{2}), all land. Black Creek forms the western edge of the CDP and flows south-southwest to join the Puerco River, part of the Little Colorado River watershed, near Houck, Arizona.

Red Lake is just north of the Navajo CDP limits.

== Demographics ==
Historical population
Census	Pop.	Note	%±
2000	2,097		—
2010	1,645		−21.6%
2020	1,942		18.1%
U.S. Decennial Census

Largest ancestries (2000)	Percent
Navajo	95.0%
German	1.0%
Pueblo	1.0%

Languages (2000)	Percent
Spoke Navajo at home	64.25%
Spoke English at home	35.75%
Spoke English "not well" or "not at all"	10.27%

At the 2000 census there were 2,097 people, 475 households, and 406 families in the CDP. The population density was 928.1 inhabitants per square mile (358.3/km^{2}). There were 560 housing units at an average density of 247.8 per square mile (95.7/km^{2}). The racial makeup of the CDP was 96.42% Native American, 2.86% White, 0.48% from two or more races, and 0.24% from other races. Hispanic or Latino of any race were 0.62%.

Of the 475 households 68.0% had children under the age of 18 living with them, 40.6% were married couples living together, 37.7% had a female householder with no husband present, and 14.5% were non-families. 12.8% of households were one person and 0.8% were one person aged 65 or older. The average household size was 4.41 and the average family size was 4.81.

The age distribution was 51.9% under the age of 18, 9.4% from 18 to 24, 26.1% from 25 to 44, 10.5% from 45 to 64, and 2.0% 65 or older. The median age was 17 years. For every 100 females, there were 88.2 males. For every 100 females age 18 and over, there were 78.4 males.

The median household income was $14,688 and the median family income was $12,569. Males had a median income of $21,518 versus $24,083 for females. The per capita income for the CDP was $4,551. About 64.0% of families and 67.4% of the population were below the poverty line, including 76.0% of those under age 18 and 63.9% of those age 65 or over.

== Education ==
It is in Gallup-McKinley County Public Schools.

The Bureau of Indian Education (BIE) operates Crystal Boarding School, a K-6 boarding school, in Crystal (it has a Navajo address).

== See also ==
- List of census-designated places in New Mexico
