= Grand Falls (Arizona) =

Waterfall system on the Little Colorado River, Coconino County

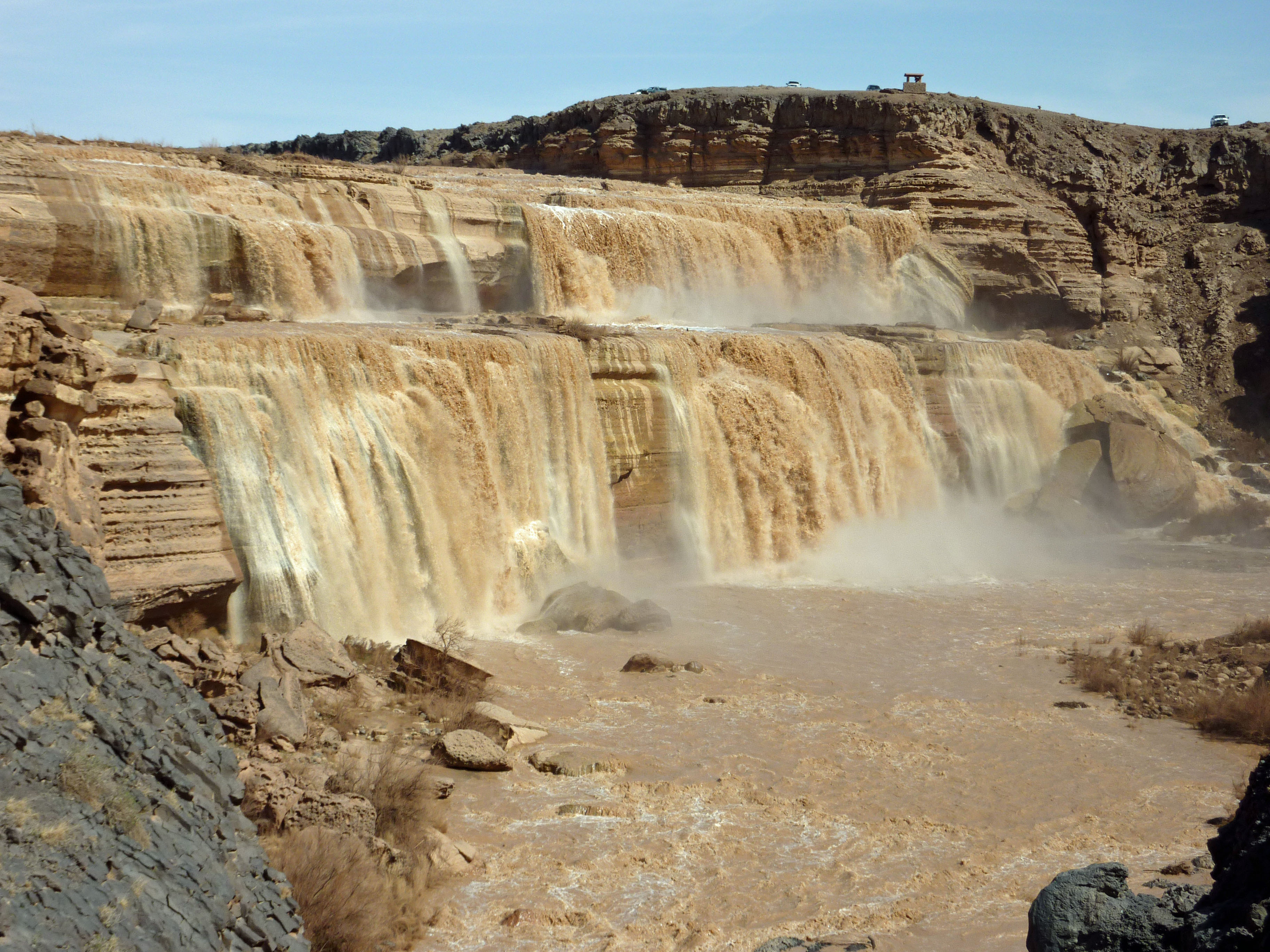
- Grand Falls of the Little Colorado River

- Location within the United States Location within Arizona
- Location: Painted Desert, Flagstaff, Arizona
- Coordinates: 35°25′39″N 111°12′03″WGrand Falls
- Total height: 185 feet (56 metres)

Grand Falls is a natural waterfall system located 30 miles (48.3 kilometers) northeast of Flagstaff, Arizona in the Painted Desert on the Navajo Nation. It is also called Chocolate Falls because of the color.

It dumps snow melt or seasonal rain into the gorge of the Little Colorado River below. It is known for its extremely muddy flow, which is a major contributor of Little Colorado River opacity. Heavy rains or snow melt will produce spectacular viewing, photography, and sound, whereas a scarcity of water will produce only trickles or no flow at all.

Grand Falls was formed when lava from nearby Merriam Crater in the San Francisco volcanic field flowed into the Little Colorado River, creating a lava dam. The river was forced to reroute itself around the dam and Grand Falls formed where the river rejoins its original course.

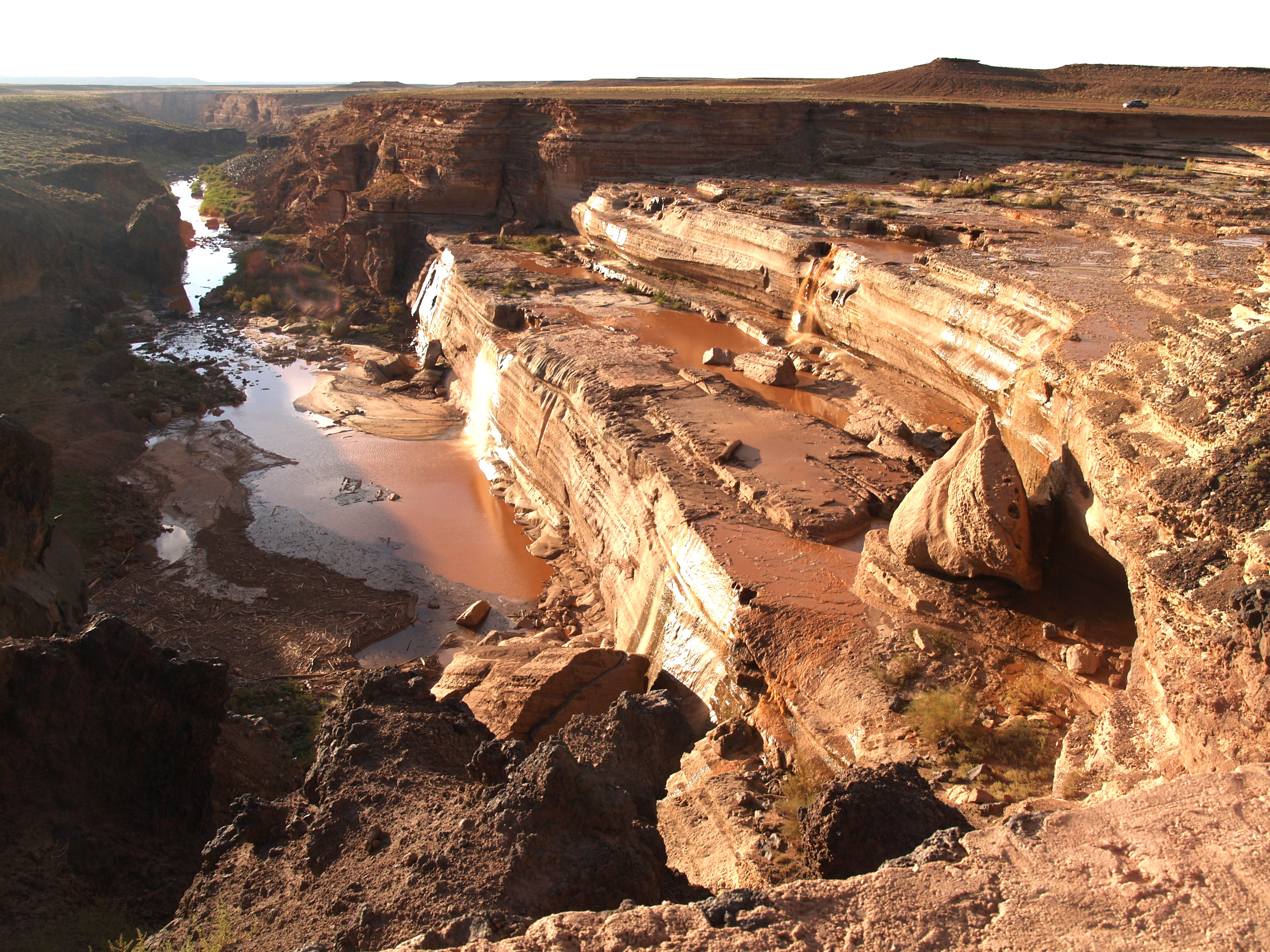
Grand Falls near Leupp, Arizona

The waterfall is remote and no major paved roads access it. The closest road, Grand Falls Road, crosses the floor of the Little Colorado River and at times during the year, only a four-wheel-drive vehicle can traverse it. The falls are dormant for months of the year and reduced to only a drip. To access the falls a passenger car can reach the south side of the river. However, a four-wheel-drive vehicle is then required and only Navajo guides or experienced back-country people are advised to take the road across the river.

The Falls used to be open to tourists prior to March 2023, but has since then been closed for its safety to the local environment.

== See also ==
- List of waterfalls
