= Indian route (United States) =

Type of highway in the United States

- Highway marker (shield) for Indian Route 18

Highway names
- Indian Route: Indian Route nn

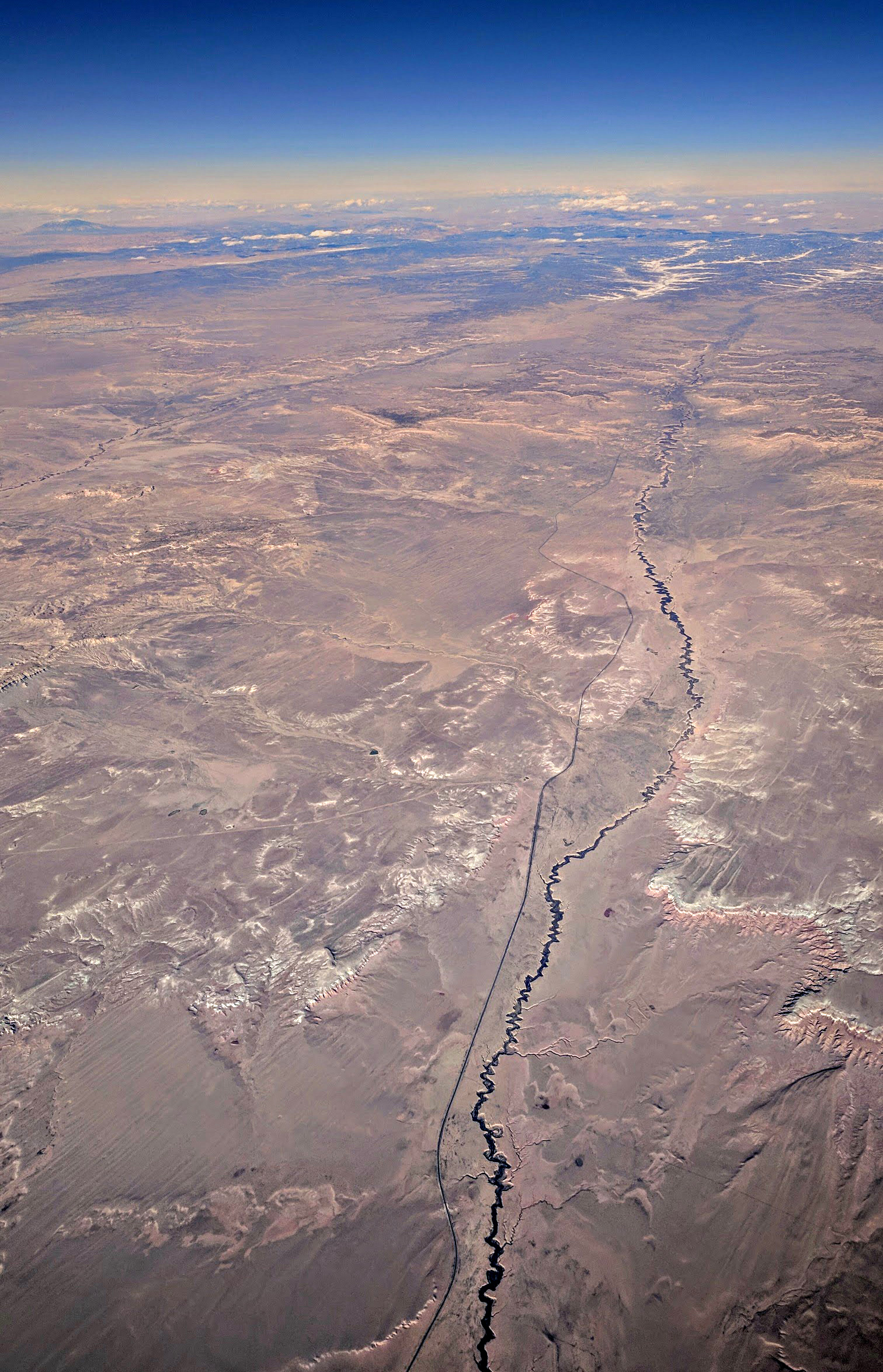
Aerial view looking north along Leupp–Oraibi Road (Indian Route 2) and the Oraibi Wash, across the Hopi Reservation in Arizona. In the distance, the route leads to Kykotsmovi Village, the home of Hopi tribal government, between Second Mesa (on the right) and Third Mesa (on the left).

An Indian route is a type of minor numbered road in the United States found on some Indian reservations. These routes are part of the Bureau of Indian Affairs (BIA) Road System, which also includes federal aid roads, interior or locally funded roads, highway trust fund roads, tribal public roads, county or township roads, parts of the state highway system, and other federal agency public roads.

== Description ==
Indian routes are signed by shields featuring a downward-pointing arrowhead with varying designs depending on the state and/or reservation. Maintenance of these routes varies by locality and could be the responsibility of the BIA, a given tribal nation, or both. BIA route numbers are used on sign posts, atlas maps, plans, programs, reports, and other bureau records requiring similar identification. A spur to an existing route is always assigned its own route number.

== Historical usage ==
Historically, the term "Indian route" referred to one or more components of an extensive network of trails used by indigenous peoples for war, trade, and migration, long before the advent of railroads and highways. These routes were often along relatively high ground or ridges where the soil dried quickly after rains and where there were few streams to be crossed, following important mountain passes to connect river drainages, while trails traveling across rather than along rivers usually followed the Fall Line. Oral tradition is usually the major source for route identification, but this is sometimes supplemented by field notes of land-grant surveys, old county maps, and historic narratives from scientists, explorers, soldiers and law enforcement officials. Later explorers, traders, and colonists followed some of the major routes, such as the Iroquois trail, up the Mohawk River, the Great Warrior Path that connected the mouth of the Scioto River to the Cumberland Gap and Tennessee Country, the Chickasaw-Choctaw Trail, which became the noted Natchez Trace, and the Occaneechi Trail, from the site of Petersburg, Virginia, southwest into the Carolinas.

== Sections ==
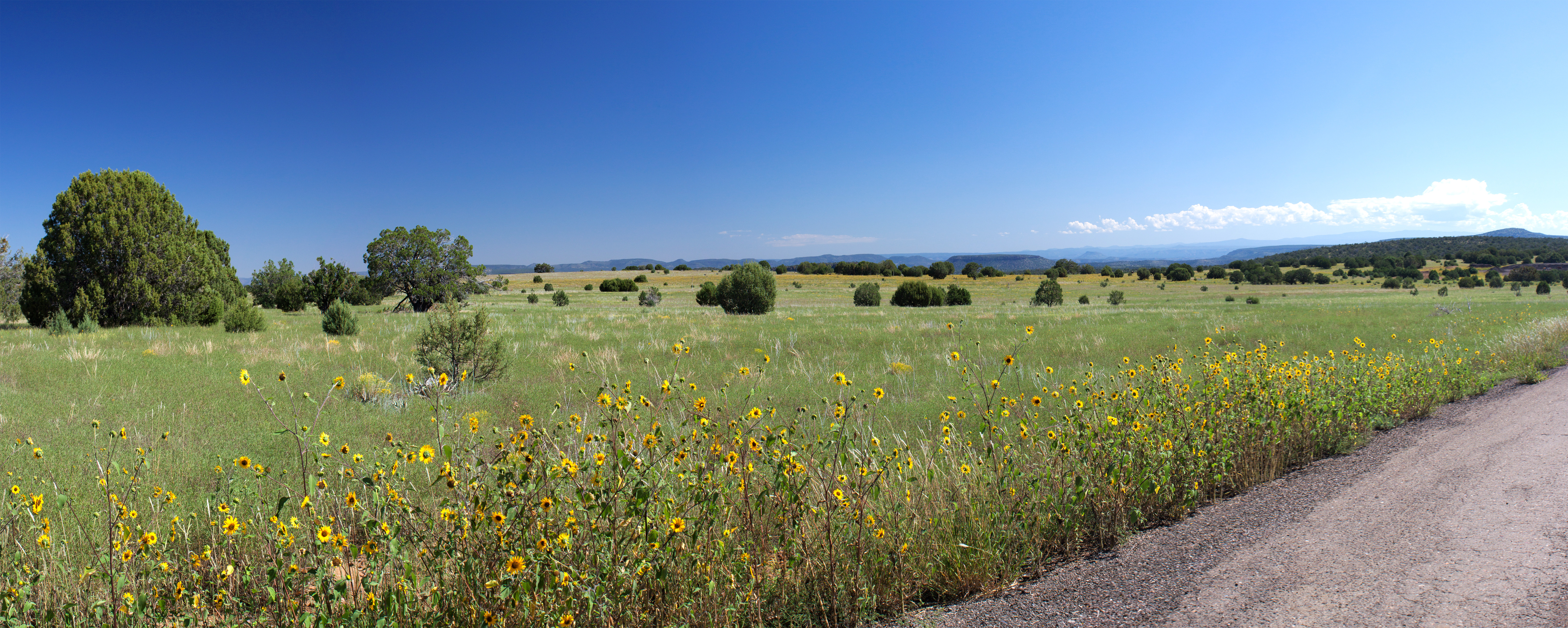
View from Indian Route 1300, San Carlos Apache Indian Reservation

Contemporary Indian routes are divided into sections, each of which represents a discrete and specifically defined portion of the route. Sections are usually numbered 10, 20, 30, etc. in one of the orders that the sections would be traversed during travel. A section break occurs when it is necessary to accurately report data associated with a change in the nature of the route. In particular, a section break is required whenever any of the following occur:

- The route crosses a state boundary
- The route crosses a county boundary
- The route crosses a reservation boundary
- The route crosses a congressional district boundary
- A bridge begins
- A bridge ends.
- The surface type changes
- The standard to which the road was constructed changes
- There is a significant change to the condition of the road

The main span of a bridge together with all its approach spans is a single section.

== See also ==
- Indian Reservation Roads Program
