= Sawmill, Arizona =

CDP in Apache County, Arizona

Sawmill, Arizona Niʼiijííh Hasání (Navajo)
- Census-designated place
- Location in Apache County and the state of Arizona

- Location in the United States
- Coordinates: 35°53′03″N 109°08′17″W
- Country: United States
- State: Arizona
- County: Apache

Area
  - Total: 6.16 sq mi (15.95 km^{2})
  - Land: 6.15 sq mi (15.93 km^{2})
  - Water: 0.0077 sq mi (0.02 km^{2})
- Elevation: 7,609 ft (2,319 m)

Population (2020)
  - Total: 564
  - Density: 92/sq mi (35.4/km^{2})
- Time zone: UTC-7 (MST)
- ZIP code: 86505
- Area code: 928
- FIPS code: 04-64590
- GNIS feature ID: 2409289

Sawmill is a census-designated place (CDP) in Apache County, Arizona, United States. Sawmill is a part of Fort Defiance Agency, which is on the Navajo Nation. The population was 748 at the 2010 census. It is named after and developed around a sawmill. A trading post has been present since 1907.

== Geography ==
According to the United States Census Bureau, the CDP has a total area of 5.78 square miles (14.96 km^{2}), of which 5.77 square miles (14.94 km^{2}) is land and 0.0077 square miles (0.02 km^{2}), or 0.14%, is water.

== Demographics ==
Historical population
Census	Pop.	Note	%±
2000	612		—
2010	748		22.2%
2020	564		−24.6%
U.S. Decennial Census

As of the census of 2000, there were 612 people, 161 households, and 123 families residing in the CDP. The population density was 105.3 inhabitants per square mile (40.7/km^{2}). There were 241 housing units at an average density of 41.5 per square mile (16.0/km^{2}). The racial makeup of the CDP was 97.1% Native American, 2.1% White, 0.5% from other races, and 0.3% from two or more races. 1.5% of the population were Hispanic or Latino of any race.

There were 161 households, out of which 44.7% had children under the age of 18 living with them, 46.6% were married couples living together, 23.6% had a female householder with no husband present, and 23.0% were non-families. 22.4% of all households were made up of individuals, and 9.3% had someone living alone who was 65 years of age or older. The average household size was 3.7 and the average family size was 4.5.

In the CDP, the age distribution of the population shows 40.4% under the age of 18, 9.6% from 18 to 24, 25.3% from 25 to 44, 16.8% from 45 to 64, and 7.8% who were 65 years of age or older. The median age was 25 years. For every 100 females, there were 98.7 males. For every 100 females age 18 and over, there were 91.1 males.

The median income for a household in the CDP was $12,875, and the median income for a family was $17,386. Males had a median income of $14,375 versus $23,409 for females. The per capita income for the CDP was $4,495. About 47.1% of families and 53.5% of the population were below the poverty line, including 53.1% of those under age 18 and 39.3% of those age 65 or over.

== Education ==
Most of Sawmill is a part of Window Rock Unified School District, while a small part is in the Chinle Unified School District.

Sawmill is served by Window Rock Elementary School, Tse Ho Tso Middle School, and Window Rock High School.

== Notable people ==
- Annie Dodge Wauneka, activist and former Navajo Nation Council member
