= Puerco River =

Waterway in Arizona

Puerco River Tó Nízhóní Rio Puerco or “Perky”
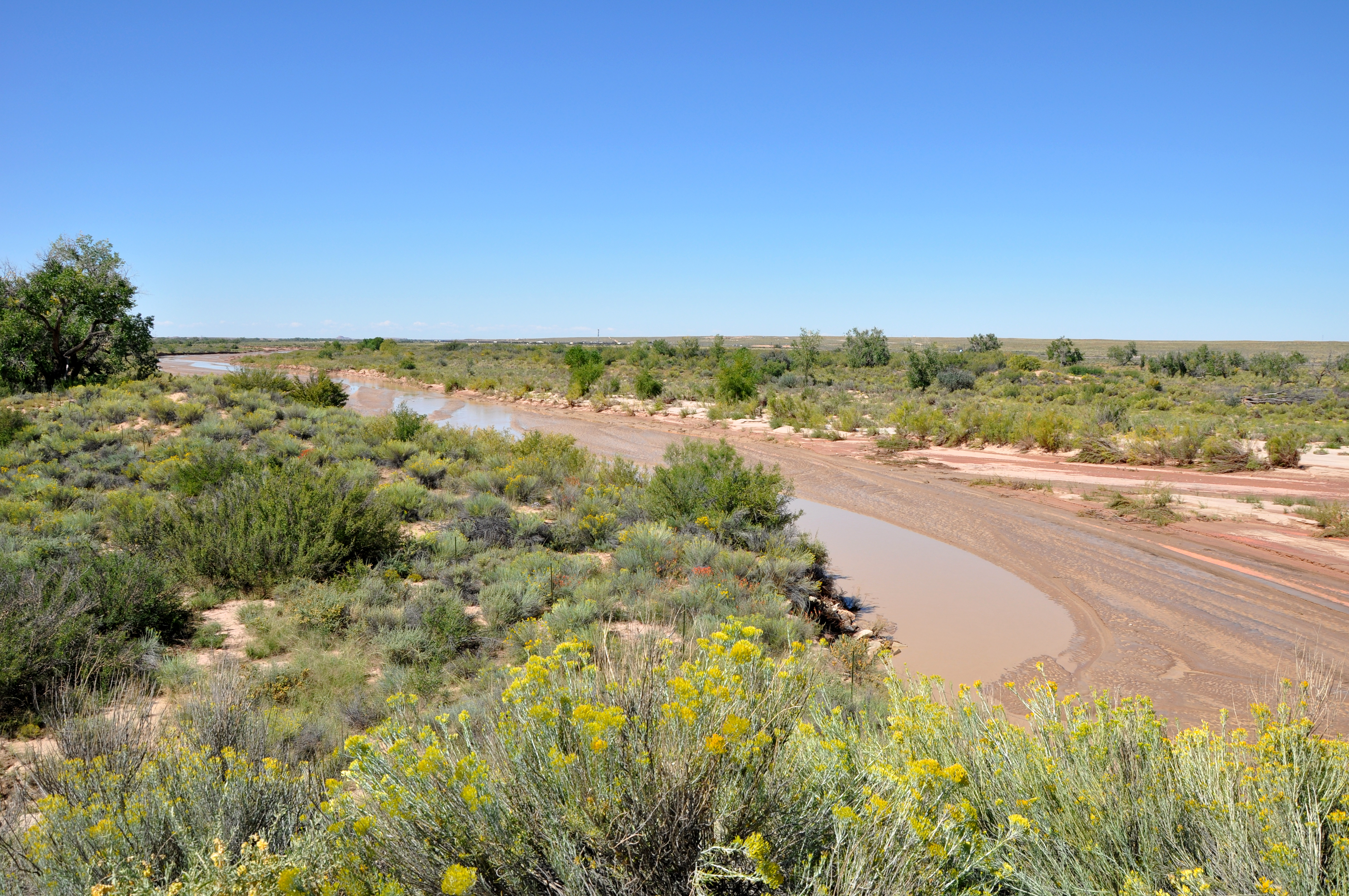
- Flowing near Puerco Pueblo, in Petrified Forest National Park

- The mouth of the Puerco River on the Little Colorado River, northeast-central Arizona

Location
- Country: United States
- State: Arizona, New Mexico
- Region: Colorado Plateau

Physical characteristics
- Source: near Hosta Butte
  - location: McKinley County, New Mexico
  - coordinates: 35°34′33″N 108°10′52″W
  - elevation: 7,930 ft (2,420 m)
- Mouth: Little Colorado River
  - location: near Holbrook, Navajo County, Arizona
  - coordinates: 34°53′20″N 110°07′17″W
  - elevation: 5,102 ft (1,555 m)
- Length: 167 mi (269 km)
- Basin size: 2,654 sq mi (6,870 km^{2})
- Discharge
  - location: near Chambers, Arizona
  - average: 70 cu ft/s (2.0 m^{3}/s)
  - minimum: 0 cu ft/s (0 m^{3}/s)
  - maximum: 17,800 cu ft/s (500 m^{3}/s)

The Puerco River (Navajo: Tó Nízhóní, Spanish: Rio Puerco, locally [ˈɹi.o ˈpwɛɹko]) is a tributary of the Little Colorado River in northwestern New Mexico and northeastern Arizona. It flows through arid terrain, including the Painted Desert.

== Name ==
The Puerco River is sometimes called Rio Puerco of the West, to distinguish it from the Rio Puerco of the East that rises in the same vicinity but flows east to the Rio Grande.

Although the word Puerco means pig, it also used to mean dirty or filthy in Spanish, this usage in the southwest United States is better translated as Dirty River or Muddy River due its high content of silt and mud.

In Navajo, the river is known as Tó Nízhóní, meaning 'beautiful water'.

== Geography ==
The intermittent river is the main tributary of the Little Colorado River, which is a tributary of the Colorado River. It drains an area of about 2,654 square miles (6,870 km^{2}) and is 167 miles (269 km) long. The river's average discharge is very low, less than 70 cubic feet per second (2.0 m^{3}/s) in normal years, because its drainage basin is extremely dry. For most of the year, the Puerco River is a braided wash containing little or no water, although large flash floods can occur in downpours.

=== Course ===
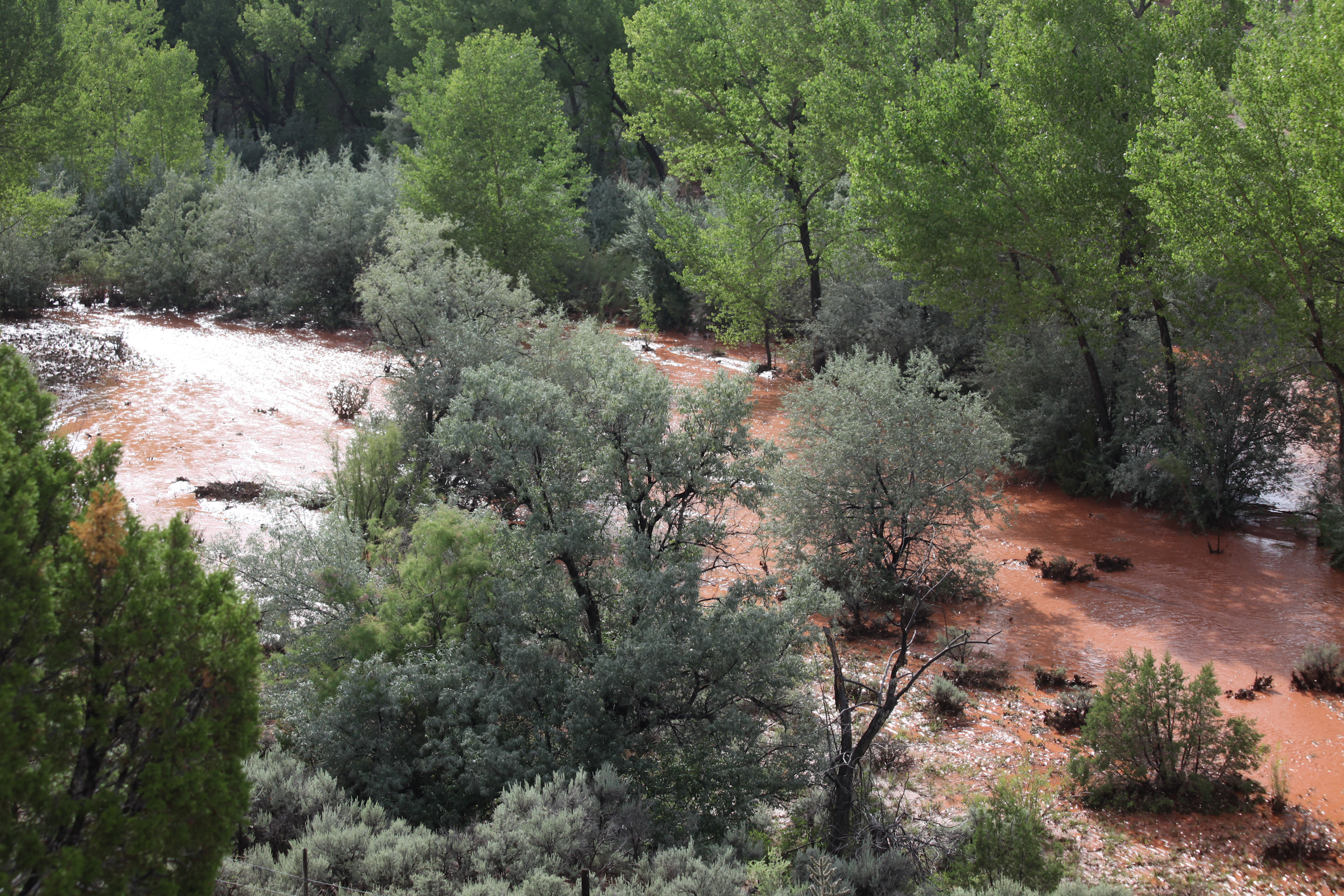
The Puerco River in McKinley County, New Mexico.

The Puerco River headwaters are on the western slopes of the Continental Divide of the Americas, 0.5 miles (0.80 km) east of Hosta Butte, in McKinley County, New Mexico. It flows first north, and then west, through a wide desert valley bordered by high rocky buttes and cliffs. It passes under Interstate 40, and receives the South Fork Puerco River from the right-south near Gallup. For most of its remaining course, I-40 and the former Atchison, Topeka and Santa Fe Railway (now the BNSF Railway) tracks follow the river's valley.

The Puerco River crosses into Apache County, Arizona. It flows by Houck, Sanders, and Chambers, and then flows through the middle of Petrified Forest National Park, where Lithodendron Wash enters from the left-north. The river then flows southwest to its confluence with the Little Colorado River, near the eastern side of Holbrook.

=== Discharge ===
The United States Geological Survey (USGS) operates a Puerco River stream gauge 1 mile (1.6 km) southwest of Chambers in Arizona. The maximum discharge recorded by this gauge between 1971 and 2009 was 17,800 cubic feet per second (500 m^{3}/s) on Sept. 30, 1971, and the minimum discharge was often zero, from a drainage basin of 2,156 square miles (5,580 km^{2}).

== Water pollution ==
Navajos in the Puerco River Valley have used surface waters in the Puerco River for livestock watering for decades.

From the 1950s through the early 1980s, the Puerco River ran almost continuously from being fed by mining wastewater, some untreated, from uranium mines upstream.

=== Radioactive spill ===
The Church Rock uranium mill spill is one of the worst radioactive spills in U.S. history. On July 16, 1979, a tailings pond at the Church Rock uranium mill, owned by United Nuclear Corporation, breached its dam and 93 million gallons (350,000 m^{3}) of radioactive, acidic uranium tailings solution flowed into the North Fork of the Puerco River. Approximately 1,100 short tons (1,000 t) of uranium mine waste contaminated 250 acres (100 ha) of land and up to 50 miles (80 km) of the Puerco River.

== See also ==
- List of tributaries of the Colorado River
- Petrified Forest National Park
- List of rivers of Arizona
- List of rivers of New Mexico
