= Eleanor Shirley =

American-Navajo jurist

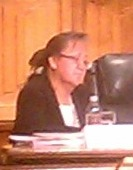
- Shirley in 2011

Interim Chief Justice of the Navajo Nation
- Incumbent
- Assumed office July 3, 2025
- Preceded by: JoAnn Jayne

Personal details
- Education: Fort Lewis College

Eleanor Shirley is an American and Navajo jurist serving as the interim chief justice of the Navajo Nation since 2025. A member of the Navajo Nation Bar Association since 1977, she has been an associate justice of the Navajo Nation Supreme Court since 2011 and previously served as a district court judge in Crownpoint, New Mexico.

Shirley was first appointed to the Supreme Court as a probationary justice in 2008. Her permanent appointment in 2011 followed a contentious confirmation process in which a Navajo Nation Council committee initially voted against her before the decision was reversed. She was formally recognized as interim chief justice on July 3, 2025.

== Early life and education ==
Shirley speaks the Navajo language. She earned a bachelor's degree in political science from Fort Lewis College.

== Career ==
Shirley has been a member in good standing of the Navajo Nation Bar Association since December 1977. She served as a district court judge for the Crownpoint, New Mexico Judicial District.

On June 27, 2008, then-president Joe Shirley Jr. appointed Eleanor Shirley to the Navajo Nation Supreme Court as a probationary associate justice. The Navajo Nation Council confirmed the probationary appointment on July 24, 2008.

In October 2010, as her probationary period concluded, the Council's Judiciary Committee voted against granting her a permanent appointment. The vote occurred despite a hearing where no negative information or comments about her were presented. Committee member Leonard Tsosie, a lawyer, stated the 4 to 3 vote against Shirley was an act of "revenge" for recent Supreme Court decisions that were unfavorable to the Council's leadership. Committee chairman Kee Allen Begay denied this accusation, stating the committee's decision was based on several factors, including Shirley's perceived "dependency" on chief justice Herb Yazzie, her "inadequate preparation," and a lack of dissenting opinions she had authored. The committee scheduled a meeting for October 28, 2010, with the intent to remove her from the bench.

In a reversal, the Law and Order Committee recommended Shirley for permanent appointment on July 27, 2011, and on August 29, president Ben Shelly issued a formal appointment letter. The Navajo Nation Council confirmed her as a permanent associate justice in October 2011, and she was sworn into office on October 19 by Window Rock, Arizona district court judge Carol Perry.

During her tenure, Shirley administered the oath of office to Speaker of the Navajo Nation Council, LoRenzo Bates on January 26, 2015. In July 2015, she served as acting chief justice, and in that capacity co-signed an agreement with the Navajo President and Speaker outlining tribal government priorities.

On July 3, 2025, Navajo Nation president Buu Nygren, speaker Crystalyne Curley, and Law and Order Committee chair Eugenia Charles-Newton formally recognized Shirley as the interim chief justice of the Navajo Nation. Her appointment followed the Council's decision not to make the previous probationary chief justice, JoAnn Jayne, permanent.

== See also ==
- List of Native American jurists
- Native American women in politics
