= JoAnn Jayne =

American politician

Chief Justice of the Navajo Nation
- In office January 24, 2018 – July 2, 2025
- Preceded by: Allen Sloan (acting)
- Succeeded by: Eleanor Shirley (interim)

Member of the Montana House of Representatives from the 15th district
- In office January 1, 2001 – January 5, 2009
- Preceded by: Rick Jore
- Succeeded by: Frosty Boss Ribs

Personal details
- Born: September 4, 1957 (age 69) Shiprock, New Mexico, U.S.
- Party: Democratic
- Children: 1
- Education: Arizona State University, Tempe (BS); University of Arizona (MS); University of Montana (JD)

JoAnn Jayne (born September 4, 1957) is an American and Navajo lawyer and jurist who served in the Montana House of Representatives and later became the first Native American woman Justice Court Judge in Montana history. She was appointed Chief Justice of the Navajo Nation in 2017 and confirmed for a probationary term in 2018, a role she held until her permanent confirmation was denied in 2025.

== Early life and education ==
Jayne was born on September 4, 1957, in Shiprock, New Mexico, and was raised in Tohatchi. A member of the Navajo Nation, she grew up on the Navajo Reservation as one of eleven children in a three-bedroom home. Her clan affiliations are Tábaahá (Water's Edge Clan), born for Kinyaa'áanii (Towering House People). Jer maternal grandfather was from the Tódích'íi'nii (Bitter Water Clan) and her paternal grandfather was from the Tábaahá (Water's Edge Clan).

Jayne completed a bachelor's degree in agricultural industry from Arizona State University and a M.S. in watershed management and hydrology from the University of Arizona. She earned J.D. from the University of Montana Law School in May 1993.

== Career ==
Before attending law school, Jayne worked as a department director for the Navajo Nation Water Management Branch. After law school, she owned a law office in Arlee, Montana, for 17 years. She is licensed to practice in Montana state and federal courts, as well as in five tribal courts, including the Navajo Nation. As of July 2017, she was an inactive member in good standing with the Navajo Nation Bar Association.

In 2000, Jayne, a Democrat, was first elected to the Montana House of Representatives and was re-elected in 2002. She ran unopposed in the elections for the 2004 and 2006 legislative sessions and served as a state representative from 2001 until 2008, when her service ended due to term limits. She was also a candidate for the Montana Senate at one time.

=== Judicial career ===
In 2012, Jayne was elected justice of the peace for Lake County, Montana, becoming the first Native American woman to serve as a Justice Court Judge in the state's history. She began her term on January 2, 2013.

In September 2013, her application for a District Court Judge position was rejected amid allegations of plagiarism. The issue arose from her submission of a court filing written by someone else as part of her application's writing sample, which Jayne described as an "inadvertent mistake made in her haste to finish her application packet." She ran for re-election as the incumbent Justice of the Peace in 2014.

Her judicial experience includes serving as an associate justice for the appeals court for the Confederated Salish and Kootenai Tribes, chief associate justice for the Blackfeet Tribal Appeals Court, and as a judge for both the Blackfeet Tribal Court and the Crow Tribal Court.

On July 11, 2017, Jayne was appointed to the Navajo Nation Supreme Court by president Russell Begaye to succeed acting justice Allen Sloan. The Navajo Nation Council confirmed her appointment as probationary chief justice for a two-year term on January 24, 2018. Upon her appointment, she became the third woman to serve as chief justice of the Navajo Nation Supreme Court. She was serving in this capacity as of 2021.

In February 2025, public hearings for her permanent confirmation were postponed after the Navajo Nation Bar Association failed to submit its required evaluation reports. In June 2025, the Navajo Nation Law and Order Committee voted 3-0, with one abstention, to deny her permanent confirmation, officially ending her tenure on the court. She was replaced by interim chief justice Eleanor Shirley in July 2025.

== Personal life ==
Jayne moved to Montana in 1987 and as of 2014, had lived in Lake County since 1992. She has one son, Harley Tanner. As of January 2018, she resided in Tohatchi, New Mexico.

== See also ==
- List of first women lawyers and judges in Montana
- List of Native American jurists
- List of Native American politicians
- Native American women in politics
