= Claudeen Arthur =

Native American lawyer (1942–2004)

Claudeen Bates Arthur

Chief Justice of the Supreme Court of the Navajo Nation
- In office November 24, 2003 – November 27, 2004
- Preceded by: Robert Yazzie
- Succeeded by: Herb Yazzie

Personal details
- Born: Claudeen Rosenda Bates; 1942; Ganado, Arizona, United States
- Died: November 27, 2004 (aged 62); Fort Defiance, Arizona
- Spouse: Harris Arthur (divorced)
- Children: 4
- Education: New Mexico State University (BA); Arizona State University (JD)

Claudeen Bates Arthur (née Claudeen Rosenda Bates, 1942 – November 27, 2004) was a Native American lawyer who was the first Navajo woman licensed as a lawyer in the United States and the first female Chief Justice of the Supreme Court of the Navajo Nation.

== Early life ==
Claudeen Rosenda Bates was born in 1942 in Ganado, Arizona, the daughter of Claude and Rose Bates. She had two sisters, Alberta and Ernestine, and a brother, Lorenzo. In her youth, Bates worked as a jockey at the family ranch in Upper Fruitland, New Mexico. She attended the Navajo Methodist Mission School and later graduated from the New Mexico State University with a bachelor's degree in Biology. Dissatisfied with being a science teacher at the Navajo Methodist Mission School, Arthur went on to get a Juris Doctor degree from the Arizona State University in 1974.

== Career ==
After graduating from college in 1974, Arthur spent two years at the New Mexico-based Navajo Legal Services and became one of the first two Navajo people, and the first Navajo woman, to be licensed as a lawyer in the United States. She was featured in a 1977 National Geographic story titled "The New Indians" which tells of Native Americans' "struggle to preserve grazing land". From 1978 to 1981, Arthur worked at the United States Department of the Interior as solicitor for the Bureau of Indian Affairs, following which she was appointed Attorney General of the Navajo Nation in 1983 and was credited with the creation and management of the Navaho Nation's Justice Department. She also provided counsel to both the Navaho Nation Council and the White Mountain Apache Tribe.

In October 2003, Arthur was confirmed as the successor to Robert Yazzie as Chief Justice of the Navajo Nation Supreme Court, becoming the third justice to be appointed to the court since its inception in 1985, as well as the first Navajo woman to hold the position. She was sworn in on November 24. After her death in 2004, Lorene Ferguson became Acting Chief Justice until Herb Yazzie was confirmed as Arthur's successor in 2005.

== Personal life and death ==
Shortly after graduating from the New Mexico State University, Claudeen Bates married Harris Arthur, who was appointed by President Jimmy Carter as Special Assistant to the Assistant Secretary for Land and Water in the Department of the Interior; the couple had four children, including Lydele, Todd, Christopher, and Sonja. She later divorced her husband. Claudeen Bates Arthur died at age 62 on November 27, 2004, at a hospital in Fort Defiance, Arizona, where she had been admitted to receive treatment for pancreatic cancer. Harris Arthur died less than a month later on December 18.

== See also ==
- List of first women lawyers and judges in the United States
