= Deannah Neswood-Gishey =

American and Navajo social worker

- Born: Deannah Neswood; 1964 or 1965 (age 60–61); St. Michaels, Arizona, U.S.
- Citizenship: Navajo Nation; United States
- Education: Mesa Community College; Arizona State University (BSW); New Mexico Highlands University (MSW)
- Children: 2
- Mother: Marie Roanhorse Neswood
- Military career
- Branch: United States Army; Arizona Army National Guard

Deannah Neswood-Gishey (born 1964 or 1965) is an American and Navajo social worker, military veteran, and public administrator who served as the executive director of the Navajo Nation Division of Social Services. A veteran of the United States Army and the Arizona Army National Guard, she has worked within the Navajo Nation's social service system for over two decades, including roles in child protective services and the Department for Self Reliance.

== Early life and education ==
Neswood-Gishey was born 1964 or 1965 and grew up in St. Michaels, Arizona. She was raised in a family of eight children by her mother, Marie Roanhorse Neswood. Her mother was the first woman to serve as a judge in the Navajo Nation court system, a career that Neswood-Gishey credits with inspiring her own commitment to public service. Five of the children in her family went on to earn at least a bachelor's degree.

Neswood-Gishey is an alumna of Mesa Community College. She earned a bachelor's degree in social work from Arizona State University in 1993 and later received a master's degree in social work from New Mexico Highlands University in 2000.

== Career ==
Neswood-Gishey is a veteran of both the United States Army and the Arizona Army National Guard. She has cited her military background as the source of her professional discipline.

Neswood-Gishey began her career with the Navajo Nation Division of Social Services around 1992. By 1997, she was employed as a social worker for child protective services, managing an average caseload of 200 clients per month, the majority of whom were on welfare. In 1998, she was based in Fort Defiance, Arizona, where she investigated cases of child abuse. She has held a license as a master social worker in New Mexico since 2004.

Prior to leading the division, Neswood-Gishey served as the program manager for the Navajo Nation Department for Self Reliance, the agency responsible for overseeing the tribe's Temporary Assistance for Needy Families (TANF) program. On April 5, 2019, Navajo Nation president Jonathan Nez appointed her as the executive director of the Division of Social Services.

In her first three weeks as acting director in 2019, she focused on program assessments, filling vacancies, and reclassifying positions. During her confirmation hearing later that year, delegates questioned her on specific issues including human trafficking prevention, foster care restoration plans, and elder abuse training. Her nomination was unanimously confirmed by the Naabik'iyati' Committee of the Navajo Nation Council in May 2019.

== Personal life ==
Neswood-Gishey is married to Frank Gishey, who works in construction. As of 1998, the couple had two sons. During the late 1990s, the family lived in St. Michaels but decided to move to a rural area in Lower Greasewood, Arizona. The move was motivated by a desire to escape rising gang violence in their suburban neighborhood and to return to a traditional Navajo lifestyle near their extended families. Their home in Lower Greasewood was built on land where Neswood-Gishey's father grew up.
