= Navajo Preparatory School =

Coordinates: 36°44′5.1″N 108°13′40.6″W

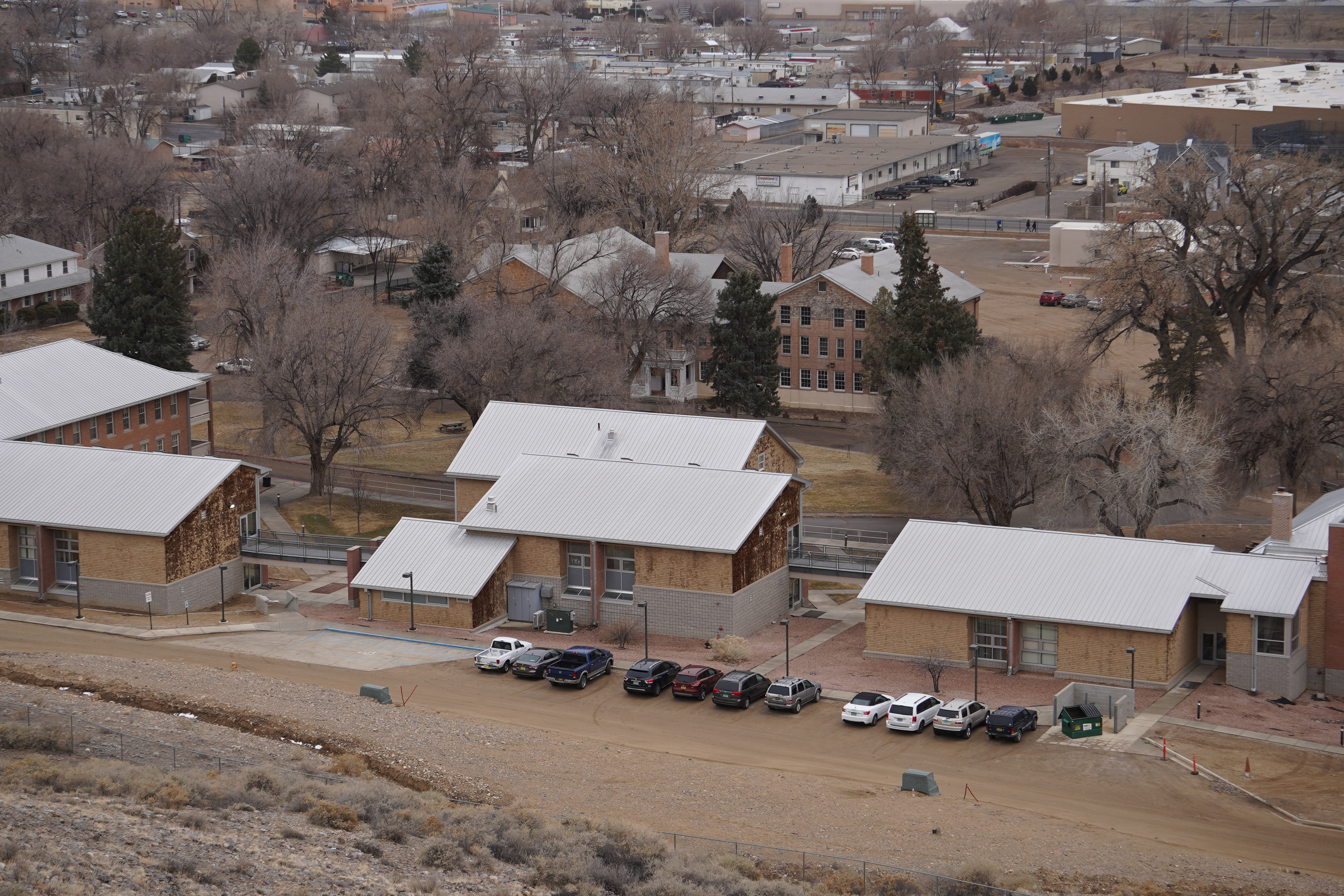

Location
- 1220 West Apache Street; Farmington, New Mexico 87401; United States

Information
- School type: College Preparatory School
- Motto: Yideską́ą́góó Naatʼáanii; Leading into the future
- Founded: 1891 as Navajo Methodist Mission School; 1991 as Navajo Prep
- NCES School ID: 590011600144
- Grades: 9-12
- Enrollment: 261 as of 2016
- Campus: Dormitory
- Colors: Black, Turquoise, Yellow, White
- Athletics conference: NMAA; District 1-AA
- Team name: Eagles
- Website: www.navajoprep.com

Navajo Preparatory School is a college preparatory school located in Farmington, New Mexico. The school is fully sanctioned by the Navajo Nation since 1991 when the previous Navajo Academy closed due to lack of funding. The campus is currently undergoing a remodelling project for the past few years that includes new dormitories, classrooms, and an athletic sports complex. The school mascot is the eagle, and the school colors are red, white, and blue.

The purpose of the program is to provide students with an academically challenging high school education which meets worldwide standards and criteria. It offers International Baccalaureate programs.

Navajo Prep is affiliated with the Bureau of Indian Education (BIE).

== History ==
Navajo Prep was also known as Navajo Methodist Mission (1891-1979), Navajo Mission Academy (1979-mid 80's) and Navajo Academy (mid 80's-1991).

=== Navajo Methodist Mission ===
In 1891, Mary L. Eldridge and Miss Mary Raymond were sent by the Women’s Home Missionary Society of the Methodist Episcopal Church to build a mission to administer to the spiritual needs of the Navajos in Jewett, known today as Hogback, New Mexico. Mrs. Mary Eldridge Tripp initially opened her cabin in 1896 as a day school for Navajo children. In 1899, a three-bedroom school house opened in Hogback, New Mexico. The school house consisted of three rooms. Two rooms were used as dorms; one for a boy’s side and the other for a girl’s side, the last room which was in the middle of the two rooms was used as the classroom. In 1899, a boarding school was attached to the school building. There were thirteen Navajo children enrolled as boarding students and twenty three white students as day students. From 1896 to 1903, the cabin that started the United Methodist Mission School was expanded. There was a new school house, new dormitory, and a new dining room built. Native American children that attended the school were so far away from home that they had trouble adjusting to the life they now lived by. Navajo children who attended the Mission Schools were forcibly taught to abandon their traditional Navajo spiritual and family ways and assimilate to Western ways of life.

Livestock and farming was a great part of the school’s historic character. Without the staff and students at the Mission, the students and staff would have little to eat because of how low the school budget became. More land was purchased in 1913 for fruit trees to be planted. There were one hundred acres of land for livestock and planting of crops, with ten acres of school ground. Children grew various types of food, such as fruit trees and vegetables. In 1911, Farmington experienced its heaviest rainfall ever. With a flood watch on 5 October 1911, children were still put to bed because the staff thought that the water would never reach their campus. On 6 October 1911 the Mission staff received a phone call at midnight that Durango, Colorado had three feet of water. Children were woken, given a blanket, and a loaf of bread. The flood hit the campus at four in the morning. The flood was half mile wide below the junction of the San Juan and Animas Rivers, and the main channel was forty feet deep. With no insurance, the loss to the Methodist amounted to $34,000.

=== Navajo Methodist Mission Academy/Navajo Academy ===
In 1976, the Navajo Tribal Council created the Navajo Academy with its first location in Ganado, Arizona. Navajo Academy and Navajo Mission had a similar academic goal that would help enhance the education of the Navajo people. With a similar mission, both schools decided to share the Mission campus in Farmington, New Mexico. This school became known as Navajo Methodist Mission Academy. The schools were not considered one school. Each school had different requirements and different objectives. Students were enrolled into different schools. During 1979, the Mission and the Academy combined their academic programs and came under the direction of one Board of Trustees. Over time the Navajo Mission School stopped its operation and the school became known as Navajo Academy. Navajo Academy continued to operate until July 1991.

== Academics and campus ==
Navajo Prep offers International Baccalaureate programs.

The school has dormitories available.

== Athletics and activities ==
Navajo Prep competes in NMAA's District 1-AAA with Crownpoint, Newcomb, Thoreau, Tohatchi, Wingate, and Zuni in most sports and Newcomb, Tohatchi, and Zuni in football.

=== Past state championships ===
Navajo Prep

- 1995 Girls Basketball, Class AA-2
- 1996 Girls Basketball, Class AA
- 1997 Girls Basketball, Class AA
- 1999 Girls Basketball, Class AA
- 2021 Girls Basketball, Class AAA
- 2024 Girls Basketball, Class AAA
- 2024 Boys Basketball, Class AAA

Navajo Academy

- 1991 Girls Basketball, Class AA-1

Navajo Mission

- 1968 Football, Class B
