= Pamela Neary =

American politician and community activist

Pamela Neary (born March 16, 1955) is an American politician and community activist. She served as a state legislator in the 1990s.

Neary received her bachelor's degree from Fort Lewis College in biology and political science and her master's degree in public affairs from the Humphrey School of Public Affairs. She moved from Colorado to Minnesota with her husband and family and settled in Afton, Minnesota. Neary worked for the Minnesota Office of the Legislative Auditor and was a program evaluator. She was also a community activist and substitute teacher. Neary served in the Minnesota House of Representatives in 1993 and 1994 and was a Democrat.
