= Fort Lewis College =

Public liberal arts college in Durango, Colorado, US

- Former names: Fort Lewis Indian School; Fort Lewis A&M College (1948–1964)
- Type: Public liberal arts college
- Established: 1911; 115 years ago
- Accreditation: Higher Learning Commission
- Academic affiliations: Council of Public Liberal Arts Colleges; Space-grant
- Endowment: $38.1 million (2025)
- President: Heather Shotton
- Provost: Mario Martinez
- Students: 3,544 (Fall 2024)
- Undergraduates: 3,393 (Fall 2024)
- Postgraduates: 152 (Fall 2024)
- Location: Durango, Colorado, U.S. 37.275°N 107.869999°W
- Campus: 247 acres (100 ha); Rural
- Colors: Dark blue, light blue, gold
- Nickname: Skyhawks
- Sporting affiliations: NCAA Division II – Rocky Mountain; USA Cycling Division I
- Mascot: Skyler the Skyhawk
- Website: fortlewis.edu

Fort Lewis College (FLC) is a public liberal arts college in Durango, Colorado, and the only four-year and graduate studies institution in the Four Corners region. FLC, in various forms, has been a U.S. military fort, an Indian boarding school, and eventually a public college.

In accordance with a 1911 mandate, Fort Lewis College provides tuition-free education to qualified Native American Tribal and Alaska Native Village members. The college serves a diverse community comprising 37% Native American/Alaska Native learners, representing 166 Native American Tribes and Alaska Native Villages, 43% first-generation students, 42% Pell Grant recipients, and 15% Hispanic students.

In 2008, the U.S. Department of Education designated FLC as a Native American-Serving, Non-Tribal Institutions (NASNTI). FLC is also recognized as a First Generation-Serving Institution by the State of Colorado and an emerging Hispanic-Serving Institution (HSI).

== History ==
The first Fort Lewis army post was constructed in Pagosa Springs, Colorado, in 1878, and was relocated in 1880 to Hesperus, Colorado, on the southern slopes of the La Plata Mountains. In 1891, Fort Lewis was decommissioned and converted into a federal, off-reservation Indian boarding school.

In 1911, the fort's property and buildings in Hesperus were transferred to the state of Colorado to establish an "agricultural and mechanic arts high school." That deed came with two conditions: that the land would be used for an educational institution, and "to be maintained as an institution of learning to which Indian students will be admitted free of tuition and on an equality with white students" in perpetuity.

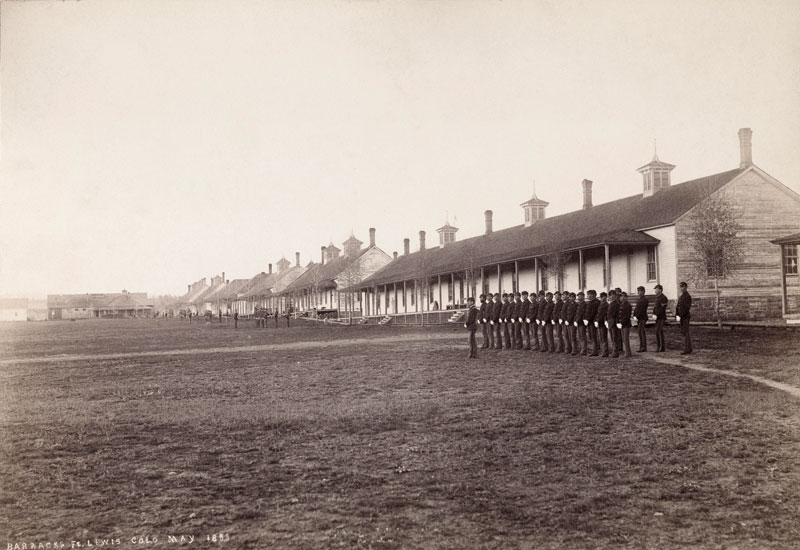
The Fort Lewis military post in Hesperus, Colorado, May 1883

In 1964, the college changed its mascot from the Aggies to the Raiders, and changed the school's colors from the green and yellow of the Colorado State University system it had been affiliated with to blue and gold. In 1994, the college's mascot became the Skyhawks. This was partly due to growing concerns over cultural insensitivity.

=== Reconciliation efforts ===
In 2019, Fort Lewis College formed the Committee on FLC History to examine its connection to the federal Indian boarding school system. The college has since undertaken initiatives including listening sessions, community engagement, and institutional changes aimed at reconciliation. In partnership with the Southern Ute Indian Tribe and the Ute Mountain Ute Tribe, FLC supported legislation investigating the impacts of federal Indian boarding schools in Colorado. The Board of Trustees reaffirmed its commitment to reconciliation in 2023.

In 2025, the Fort Lewis College Board of Trustees named Heather Shotton the new college president, making her the first Indigenous person to hold the position. Shotton, who is Cheyenne and Kiowa and a citizen of the Wichita & Affiliated Tribes, had previously served as FLC's Vice President of Diversity Affairs.

== Campus ==
The U.S. Green Building Council awarded the Fort Lewis College Student Union LEED Gold status for its sustainability features. It is the third LEED Gold building on campus, along with the Berndt Hall Biology Wing and Animas Hall. Those environmental awards helped FLC be named one of "America's Coolest Schools" by Sierra magazine, the official publication of the Sierra Club, in 2011.

== Academics ==
Fort Lewis College is divided into three academic units: the School of Arts & Sciences, the Katz School of Business, and the School of Education. These units collectively offer 60 undergraduate majors, 47 minors, and 23 certificates. The college also provides five graduate programs and four graduate certificates in education. Additionally, Fort Lewis College offers two "3+2" master's programs in social work and public history, in partnership with the University of Colorado-Denver and the University of Denver, respectively.

The institution is accredited by the Higher Learning Commission. Specific programs are also accredited by relevant professional bodies, including:

- Engineering: ABET
- Katz School of Business: Association to Advance Collegiate Schools of Business, covering degree programs in Accounting, Business Administration, Economics, and Marketing
- Music: National Association of Schools of Music

The college's education programs are also approved by the Colorado Department of Education.

== Athletics ==
The college's athletic teams, the Skyhawks, compete in the NCAA at the Division II level as a member of the Rocky Mountain Athletic Conference (RMAC); as well as the Western Intercollegiate Lacrosse Association (WILA) for women's lacrosse and a nationally ranked cycling program that competes at the Division I level of USA Collegiate Cycling. In 2017, FLC's cycling program won its 23rd national championship at the 2017 USA Cycling Collegiate Mountain Bike National Championships in Missoula, Montana.

=== Ray Dennison Memorial Field and foundational use of "student-athlete" ===
Home football games and lacrosse matches are hosted at Ray Dennison Memorial Field, which can accommodate 4,000 - 6,000 spectators. The field was named in honor of Fort Lewis A&M College football player Ray Dennison, a 26-year-old married father of three who died as a result of an on-field collision while playing in a football game vs. Trinidad Junior College in September 1955. Following his death, his widow filed a claim for death benefits with the Colorado Industrial Commission. The commission approved the claim which was affirmed on appeal by a Colorado district court. However, Fort Lewis College together with the State Compensation Insurance Fund appealed the claim to the Colorado Supreme Court. In 1957, the court ruled that his widow was not entitled to death benefits because football players are "student-athletes" and the employer-employee relationship does not exist. This ruling was foundational to defining the legal relationship between the colleges and their athletes and one of the earliest known uses of the term student-athlete.

Men's sports:

- Basketball
- Cross country
- Cycling (club)
- Football
- Golf
- Soccer
- Track and Field

Women's sports:

- Basketball
- Cross country
- Golf
- Lacrosse
- Soccer
- Softball
- Volleyball
- Track and Field

== Notable alumni ==
- Linden Ashby (attended) – actor
- David M. Beazley – Python developer and author
- Chris Camozzi (attended) – professional mixed martial artist
- Eric Coble – playwright and screenwriter
- Noah Dillon - musician, photographer, and director
- Salifu Jatta – professional footballer
- Myron Lizer – politician and businessman
- Nicco Montaño – professional mixed martial artist
- Pamela Neary – politician
- Brianne Nelson – distance runner
- Eleanor Shirley – judge and interim chief justice of the Navajo Nation
- Scott Stamper – professional football player
- Scott Tipton – politician
