= Marie Neswood =

Navajo judge and politician

- Neswood in 1977

Delegate to the Navajo Nation Council
- In office 1991–1995
- Constituency: St. Michaels Chapter

Judge of the Navajo Nation
- In office 1976–1989
- Constituency: Crownpoint District

Personal details
- Born: May 24, 1932 Crystal, New Mexico, U.S.
- Died: December 24, 2017 (aged 85)
- Citizenship: Navajo Nation; United States
- Children: 8; including Deannah
- Education: University of New Mexico

Marie Roanhorse Neswood (May 24, 1932 – December 24, 2017) was a Navajo judge and politician. She was the first woman confirmed as a judge for the Navajo Nation, serving on the bench from 1976 to 1989. Following her retirement from the judiciary, Neswood was elected as a delegate to the Navajo Nation Council, serving from 1991 to 1995.

== Early life and education ==
Neswood was born on May 24, 1932, and was originally from Crystal, New Mexico. Her father died when she was two years old. From the age of five, she assumed household responsibilities, including carrying water long distances and making bread. She attended St. Michael Indian School where she graduated from high school.

Neswood originally aspired to become a medical technologist because of her interest in science and mathematics. Without her prior knowledge, officials at her high school submitted her transcript to Saint Francis College, which awarded her a scholarship. She attended the college for one year while working to support herself but returned home to marry. She later enrolled in a University of New Mexico program held at Highlands University, where she completed a two-year business administration course in a single year.

== Career ==
Neswood began working for several departments of the Navajo tribe in 1964. Her early career included roles with the Office of the Prosecutor and the Navajo Nation Police Department. She also spent over a dozen years with the tribal judicial department, working as a court clerk in Shiprock, New Mexico.

Neswood completed a two-year law for the layperson curriculum at the University of New Mexico-Gallup Campus and participated in a scholarship program in Law for American Indians. She was a member of the 1971 class of the Pre-Law Summer Institute for American Indians and Alaska Natives and completed courses at the National Judicial College.

Neswood was appointed to the Crownpoint District Court and served as a judge for the Navajo Nation from 1976 to 1989. She was the first woman to be confirmed as a Navajo Nation judge. During her tenure on the bench, she served for a period as the acting chief justice of the Court of Appeals. In 1982, Neswood participated in the judicial deliberations regarding the creation of the Navajo Peacemaker Court. While initially expressing hesitation about blending traditional customs with formal court operations, she eventually gave her tentative support to the plan.

After retiring from the judicial branch, Neswood was elected to the Navajo Nation Council. She served as the Council Delegate for the St. Michaels Chapter from 1991 to 1995.

== Personal life ==
She married Nelson Neswood of lower Greasewood, Arizona. The couple had eight children and lived in St. Michaels, Arizona, in a home built by her husband. In 1966, Neswood was involved in a car accident while returning from Albuquerque, New Mexico with several of her children. The vehicle ended up in an arroyo, but she survived. Her husband died approximately two years prior to December 1976. Neswood was a devout Catholic.

Neswood died on December 24, 2017, at the age of 85. Funeral services were held in late December 2017 at St. Michael Catholic Church and the St. Michael Indian School Chapel.

== See also ==
- List of Native American jurists
- List of Native American politicians
- Native American women in politics
