= Supreme Court of the Navajo Nation =

Native American judicial authority

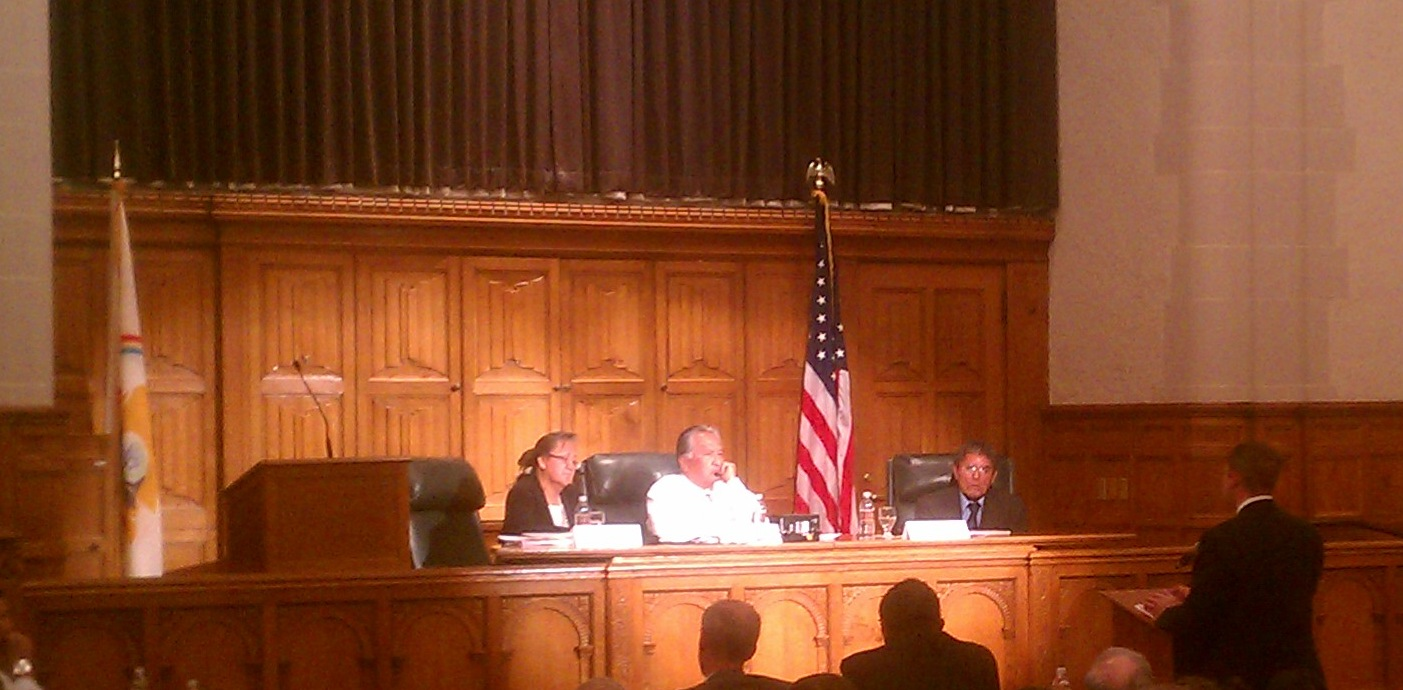
The Supreme Court heard oral arguments at Yale Law School in New Haven, Connecticut, on November 14, 2011. Pictured are former Chief Justice Herb Yazzie (center), Justice Eleanor Shirley (left), and Justice Wilson Yellowhair (right, sitting by special designation).

The Supreme Court of the Navajo Nation is the highest judicial Native American authority of the Navajo Nation, the largest American Indian nation in the United States. According to Harvard Law School, "the judicial system of the Navajo Nation is the most active tribal judicial system in the United States, with a case load that rivals, and in some instances exceeds, many municipal, county, and state judicial systems."

The Supreme Court of the Navajo Nation sits in Window Rock. It is a three-member body consisting of the Chief Justice JoAnn Jayne and Associate Justice Eleanor Shirley. The third seat is currently vacant; a district court judge temporarily fills the seat by designation when the Court hears a case.

== History ==
The Supreme Court of the Navajo Nation was originally created as the Navajo Tribal Court of Appeals on 1 April 1959 as part of the implementation of the Navajo Tribal Council's establishment of the judiciary as a separate branch of government, the "Judicial Branch of the Navajo Nation Government". Originally it was the court of last resort on the Navajo Nation. From 1978 to 1985 the "Supreme Judicial Council", a political body rather than a court, could hear appeals, on a discretionary basis, from the Navajo Tribal Court of Appeals.

In December 1985 the Supreme Judicial Council was eliminated and the Navajo Tribal Court of Appeals became the Supreme Court of the Navajo Nation. It was expressly made the court of last resort.

== See also ==
- Navajo Nation Bar Association
- Tribal sovereignty in the United States
