= Navajo Nation Bar Association =

The Navajo Nation Bar Association (NNBA) is the mandatory bar association responsible for licensing all legal practitioners who wish to appear in the courts of the Navajo Nation. Formed in 1978, the association operates within a legal framework that blends Anglo-American law with Navajo traditional law, which is rooted in the Nation's matriarchal culture. This integration was formalized in the early 1980s through an agreement to incorporate Navajo customs and traditions into the court system.

Membership in the NNBA is a prerequisite for practice and includes two types of legal practitioners, attorneys with law degrees and tribal court advocates. The tribal court advocate program allows enrolled members of the Navajo Nation to practice without a law degree after passing the bar exam, ensuring that practitioners have an indispensable understanding of Navajo life and culture. The NNBA administers its bar exam semiannually and requires all new members to attend a mandatory course on Navajo history, culture, and traditional law. In addition to licensing, the association holds annual conferences, provides training for the bar exam, and issues publications on Navajo law.

== History ==
The Navajo Nation Bar Association (NNBA) was formed in 1978. Its creation was driven by the leadership of lawyers and lay advocates from DNA-People's Legal Services, who fostered a new legal culture within the Nation. One of the founders was Tom Tso, who later became a judge and served as a president of the bar association before his judicial appointment.

The NNBA operates within a legal framework that is historically and philosophically distinct from Anglo-American systems. Navajo traditional law is rooted in a matriarchal society where women have historically held equal status with men in decisions affecting the family and tribe, a status the Navajo Supreme Court has described as "revered." This tradition contrasts sharply with external historical biases, such as the 19th-century U.S. Army officers at Fort Sumner who incorrectly assumed the matriarchal Navajo society was a patriarchy. Later, the introduction of the Anglo-American wage economy created a new economic dependency for Navajo women, leaving them in a vulnerable position upon divorce that had not existed in the traditional economy, where women held significant economic power and customarily kept the marital property. This shift necessitated the adoption of new legal remedies like alimony to address modern injustices.

In the early 1980s, the NNBA's president was involved in discussions with Navajo judges and the Judiciary Committee. These talks led to a formal agreement to incorporate Navajo customs and traditions as law into the court system, a key step in developing a modern jurisprudence that reflects the Nation's unique cultural values.

== Membership and the judiciary ==
Membership in the NNBA is a prerequisite for practicing in the Navajo Nation courts. The association has licensed hundreds of members, including both Navajo and non-Navajo individuals. As of 1983, the organization had about 250 members, most of whom had not attended law school. The membership includes two types of practitioners, attorneys who are law school graduates, and "tribal court advocates," who are not required to have a law degree but receive other legal training.

The tribal court advocate program allows enrolled members of the Navajo Nation to practice in the Nation's courts without a law degree, provided they pass the bar exam. According to the Navajo Supreme Court, this program helps to advance a modern judicial system that retains traditional Navajo norms by ensuring practitioners have an "indispensable" understanding of Navajo life and culture. Hilary C. Tompkins, a graduate of Dartmouth College who later became a solicitor for the U.S. Department of the Interior, began her legal career as a tribal court advocate after joining the NNBA in 1992.

Reflecting the high status of women in Navajo tradition, the Nation's modern judiciary has seen significant female leadership. As of 2002, the judiciary was majority-female, with nine of fifteen trial judges and two of three Supreme Court justices being women. Female judges have included Marie F. Neswood, who in 1983 was a senior judge and the highest-ranking female Navajo official. In a notable example of the leadership roles held by Native women, NNBA member Hilary Tompkins, in her capacity as U.S. solicitor, and Elouise P. Cobell, the lead plaintiff, were the lead negotiators in Cobell v. Salazar.

=== Bar examination ===
The NNBA administers its bar exam semiannually. To be eligible, a non-Navajo applicant must be a member of a state bar. A Navajo applicant must be a law school graduate, have completed a certified Navajo bar training course, or have served an apprenticeship of at least six months.

The exam covers a range of topics including Western Anglo law, Navajo traditional law, federal Indian law, the Navajo Treaty of 1868, and Navajo land and family law. Over the two decades leading up to 1993, the exam became significantly more difficult, leading to a lower passage rate for new advocates.

The association provides resources to help candidates prepare. The NNBA's Training Committee holds a week-long bar review course where members give presentations on exam subjects. After passing the exam, all new members must attend a mandatory "traditional teachings course" taught by Navajos that covers Navajo history, culture, and traditional law.

== Legal philosophy and practice ==
NNBA members practice within a legal system that consciously affirms traditional Navajo values, particularly regarding the equality of women. The Navajo Nation Bill of Rights includes an Equal Rights Amendment, added in 1980, which explicitly bars the denial of rights on account of sex and was intended to codify the traditional importance of women in Navajo society.

The Navajo Supreme Court actively applies these principles. For example, in adopting a husband-wife privilege, the court explicitly rejected the biased Anglo common law rationale that a wife has no separate legal existence from her husband, a premise that conflicts with Navajo tradition. This legal philosophy is reflected in practice, as Navajo women are primary users of the Nation's Peacemaker (mediation) system. Many women have been found to select the peacemaking process even in domestic violence cases, and women, such as Betty Donald of the Tuba City district, serve as peacemakers.

== Roles and activities ==
The primary role of the NNBA is to oversee the licensing of all legal practitioners who wish to appear in the Navajo Nation courts. The association holds an annual conference, which has served as a venue for official proceedings, including oral arguments by the Navajo Supreme Court. It also holds an annual meeting, such as the one on April 3, 1982, in Gallup, New Mexico, which featured Navajo Nation chairman Peter MacDonald as the keynote speaker. In addition, the bar association contributes to legal scholarship by issuing publications on Navajo law.
