= Secretarial Review =

1934 law on Native Americans

Secretarial Review is a part of the Indian Reorganization Act of 1934 (IRA) in the United States. According to this law, Native American tribes were expected to write constitutions loosely resembling the United States Constitution. These IRA constitutions provided for a tribal council elected by the population and a chair person for the tribe; the chair person was either elected at-large, or was chosen from among the members of the council.

There was generally no provision for a Tribal Judiciary. In the section of the tribal constitutions pertaining to the powers of the Tribal Council, there was generally a paragraph entitled "Manner of Review" which stated, "[a]ny resolution or ordinance which by the terms of this Constitution, is subject to review by the Secretary of the Interior, shall be presented to the Superintendent of the reservation who shall, within ten days thereafter, approve or disapprove of the same."

As Tribal leaders engage in constitutional reform, the review by the Secretary of Interior is often removed from the constitution.
