= Navajo Nation =

Largest federally recognized tribe in the United States

Navajo Nation Naabeehó Bináhásdzo (Navajo)
- Indian reservation
- Flag Seal
- Location of the Navajo Nation. Checkerboard-area in lighter shade (see § Geography)
- Established: June 1, 1868 (Treaty)
- Expansions: 1878–2016
- Chapter system: 1922
- Tribal Council: 1923
- Capital: Window Rock (Tségháhoodzání)
- Subdivisions: 5 Agencies: Chʼínílį́; Tó Naneezdizí; Naatʼáanii Nééz; Tséhootsooí; Tʼiistsʼózí; 110 Chapters

Government
  - Type: Tribal Autonomous administrative division
  - Body: Navajo Nation Council
  - President: Buu Nygren (D)
  - Vice President: Richelle Montoya
  - Speaker: Crystalyne Curley
  - Chief Justice: Eleanor Shirley (interim)

Area
  - Total: 27,000 sq mi (71,000 km^{2})

Population (2020)
  - Total: 165,158
  - Density: 6.0/sq mi (2.3/km^{2})
- 160,552 Native American; 4,606 White
- Time zone: MST/MDT
- Website: www.navajo-nsn.gov

Map of Navajo Nation agencies and chapters

Navajo Woman at a waterfall c. 1920

The Navajo Nation (Navajo: Naabeehó Bináhásdzo), also known as Navajoland, is a Native American reservation of Navajo people in the United States. It occupies portions of northeastern Arizona, northwestern New Mexico, and southeastern Utah. The seat of government is located in Window Rock, Arizona.

At roughly 17,544,500 acres (71,000 km^{2}; 27,413 sq mi), the Navajo Nation is the largest Native American reservation in the United States, exceeding the size of ten U.S. states. It is one of the few reservations whose lands overlap the nation's traditional homelands. In 2010, the reservation was home to 173,667 out of 332,129 Navajo tribal members; the remaining 158,462 tribal members lived outside the reservation, in urban areas (26%), border towns (10%), and elsewhere in the U.S. (17%). In 2020, the number of tribal members increased to 399,494, surpassing the Cherokee Nation as the largest tribal group by enrollment.

The United States gained ownership of what is today Navajoland in 1848 after the end of the Mexican–American War. Between 1863 and 1866, the U.S. Army forced more than 10,000 Navajo to leave their homeland and walk about 300 miles (480 km) east to Bosque Redondo, a camp in eastern New Mexico. This forced removal is known as the Long Walk. The Navajo were allowed to return home after their leaders signed the Treaty of Bosque Redondo with the United States on June 1, 1868. The reservation created by the treaty covered roughly 3,300,000 acres (13,000 km^{2}) along the line between the Arizona and New Mexico territories, which became a state border when both were admitted to the union in 1912. Unlike many reservations in the U.S., it has grown several times since then, reaching its current boundaries in 1934, and has kept its sovereignty.

The Navajo Nation governs itself through executive, legislative and judicial branches, a structure adopted when the government was reorganized in 1989. The executive branch is headed by the President of the Navajo Nation. Laws are made by the Navajo Nation Council, whose 24 delegates represent 110 local communities known as chapters; the council was reduced from 88 delegates to 24 in 2011. The official language of the Navajo Nation is Navajo (Diné Bizaad). The council voted to give it this status, and the law was signed by the president on December 24, 2024.

Coal has long been an important source of jobs and income for the Navajo Nation. The Navajo Generating Station, a coal-fired power plant near Page, Arizona, and the Kayenta Mine that supplied it both closed in 2019. Most of their workers were Native American, and the closures cost the tribal government millions of dollars a year in revenue. The reservation also includes well-known sites that draw visitors, such as Monument Valley, which the Navajo Nation runs as a tribal park, and Canyon de Chelly National Monument, which lies entirely on Navajo tribal trust land and is run by the National Park Service in partnership with the Navajo Nation.

As of 2020, more than 30 percent of households on the reservation did not have running water. Uranium mining has also left contamination behind. Between 1944 and 1986, close to 30 million tons of uranium ore were mined on Navajo land, and more than 500 abandoned mines remain on and near the reservation. In May 2020, early in the COVID-19 pandemic, the Navajo Nation passed New York State to have the highest per-capita infection rate in the United States.

== Terminology ==
In English, the official name for the area was Navajo Indian Reservation, as outlined in Article II of the 1868 Treaty of Bosque Redondo. On April 15, 1969, the tribe changed its official name to the "Navajo Nation", which is displayed on its seal. In 1994, the Tribal Council rejected a proposal to change the official designation from "Navajo" to "Diné", a traditional name for the people. Councilmembers in opposition to the change argued that Diné represented the people in their time of suffering before the Long Walk, and that Navajo is the appropriate designation for the future. In the Navajo language, Diné means "the People", a term used in many languages as an endonym. Among the Navajo populace, both terms are employed. In 2017, the Navajo Nation Council again rejected legislation to change the name to "Diné Nation", citing potential "confusion and frustration among Navajo citizens and non-Navajos".

In Navajo, the geographic entity with its legally defined borders is known as Naabeehó Bináhásdzo. This contrasts with Diné Bikéyah and Naabeehó Bikéyah for the general idea of "Navajoland". Neither of these terms should be confused with Dinétah, the term used for the traditional homeland of the Navajo. This is located in the area among the four sacred Navajo mountains of Dookʼoʼoosłííd (San Francisco Peaks), Dibé Ntsaa (Hesperus Mountain), Sisnaajiní (Blanca Peak), and Tsoodził (Mount Taylor).

== History ==
The Navajo people's tradition of governance is rooted in their clans and oral history. The clan system of the Diné is integral to their society. The system has rules of behavior that extend to the manner of refined culture that the Navajo people call "walking in beauty". The philosophy and clan system were established long before the Spanish colonial occupation of Dinétah, through to July 25, 1868, when Congress ratified the Navajo Treaty with President Andrew Johnson, signed by Barboncito, Armijo, and other chiefs and headmen present at Bosque Redondo, New Mexico.

The Navajo people have continued to transform their conceptual understandings of government since signing the Treaty of 1868. Social, cultural, and political academics continue to debate the nature of modern Navajo governance and how it has evolved to include the systems and economies of the Western world.

=== Reservation and expansion ===
Border changes and expansions of the Navajo Reservation from 1868 to 1934

Map of the Navajo Nation shown within the Four Corners region of the Southwestern United States

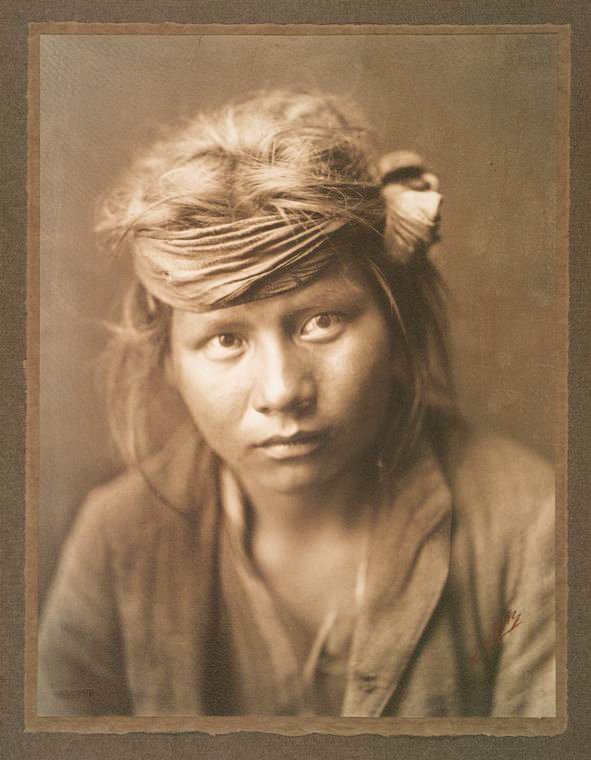
1904 photograph of a young Navajo man

In the mid-19th century, primarily in the 1860s, most of the Navajo were forced to abandon their homes due to a series of military campaigns by the U.S. Army conducted with a scorched-earth policy and sanctioned by the U.S. government. The Army burned their homes and agricultural fields, and stole or killed livestock, to weaken and starve the Navajo into submission. In 1864, the main body of Navajo, numbering 8,000 adults and children, were marched 300 miles (500 km) on the Long Walk to imprisonment in Bosque Redondo. The Treaty of 1868 established the "Navajo Indian Reservation" and the Navajo people left Bosque Redondo for this territory.

The borders were defined as the 37th parallel in the north; the southern border as a line running through Fort Defiance; the eastern border as a line running through Fort Lyon; and in the west as longitude 109°30′.

As drafted in 1868, the boundaries were defined as:

the following district of country, to wit: bounded on the north by the 37th degree of north latitude, south by an east and west line passing through the site of old Fort Defiance, in Canon Bonito, east by the parallel of longitude which, if prolonged south, would pass through old Fort Lyon, or the Ojo-de-oso, Bear Spring, and west by a parallel of longitude about 109º 30' west of Greenwich, provided it embraces the outlet of the Canon-de-Chilly [Canyon de Chelly], which canyon is to be all included in this reservation, shall be, and the same hereby, set apart for the use and occupation of the Navajo tribe of Indians, and for such other friendly tribes or individual Indians as from time to time they may be willing, with the consent of the United States, to admit among them; and the United States agrees that no persons except those herein so authorized to do, and except such officers, soldiers agents, and employees of the Government, or of the Indians, as may be authorized to enter upon Indian reservations in discharge of duties imposed by law, or the orders of the President, shall ever be permitted to pass over, settle upon, or reside in, the territory described in this article.

Though the treaty had provided for one hundred miles by one hundred miles in the New Mexico Territory, the size of the territory was 3,328,302 acres (13,470 km^{2}; 5,200 sq mi)—slightly more than half. This initial piece of land is represented in the design of the Navajo Nation's flag by a dark-brown rectangle.

As no physical boundaries or signposts were set in place, many Navajo ignored these formal boundaries and returned to where they had been living prior to the U.S. occupation. A significant number of Navajo had never lived in the Hwéeldi (near Fort Sumner). They remained or moved near the Little Colorado and Colorado rivers, on Naatsisʼáán (Navajo Mountain), and some lived with Apache bands.

The first expansion of the territory occurred on October 28, 1878, when President Rutherford Hayes signed an executive order pushing the reservation boundary 20 miles (32 km) to the west. Further additions followed throughout the late 19th and early 20th century (see map). Most of these additions were achieved through executive orders, some of which were confirmed by acts of Congress. For example, President Theodore Roosevelt's executive order to add the region around Aneth, Utah in 1905 was confirmed by Congress in 1933.

The eastern border was shaped primarily as a result of allotments of land to individual Navajo households under the Dawes Act of 1887. This experiment was designed to assimilate Native Americans into mainstream American culture. The federal government proposed to divide communal lands into plots assignable to heads of household – tribal members – for their subsistence farming, in the pattern of small family farms common among Americans. This was intended to extinguish tribal land claims for such territory. The land allocated to these Navajo heads of household was initially not considered part of the reservation. Further, the federal government determined that land "left over" after all members had received allotments was to be considered "surplus" and available for sale to non-Native Americans. The allotment program continued until 1934. Today, this patchwork of reservation and non-reservation land is called the "checkerboard area". It resulted in the loss of much Navajo land.

In the southeastern area of the reservation, the Navajo Nation has purchased some ranches, which it refers to as its Nahata Dził, or New Lands. These lands are leased to Navajo individuals, livestock companies, and grazing associations.

In 1996, Elouise Cobell (Blackfeet) filed a class-action lawsuit against the federal government on behalf of an estimated 250,000–500,000 plaintiffs, Native Americans whose trust accounts did not reflect an accurate accounting of money owed them under leases or fees on trust lands. The settlement of Cobell v. Salazar in 2009 included a provision for a nearly $2 billion fund for the government to buy fractionated interests and restore land to tribal reservations. Individuals could sell their fractionated land interests on a voluntary basis, at market rates, through this program if their tribe participated.

Through March 2017, under the Tribal Nations Buy-Back Program, individual Navajo members received $104 million for purchase of their interests in land; 155,503 acres were returned to the Navajo Nation for its territory by the Department of Interior under this program.

=== Clan governance ===
In traditional Navajo culture, the Navajo tribal body is separated into smaller self-governing bodies, matrilineal kinship groups, typically referred to as clans. Individual clans typically could not represent the needs, goals, and qualities of other Navajo clans. Children are considered to be born into the mother's family and gain their social status from her and her clan. The mother's eldest brother traditionally has a strong influence on rearing the children.

Every Navajo person is linked to four clans. When introducing themselves, Navajo people name their mother's clan first, then their father's clan, followed by the clans of their maternal and paternal grandfathers. In Navajo tradition, the first four clans were created by Changing Woman, and Bitter Water (Tódíchʼííʼnii) is one of them. Other clans came later. Most are named after places linked to their early history, while some are named after outside peoples whose members joined the Navajo, such as the Zuni, Apache, Ute and Mexican clans.

One of the main purposes of the clan system has been to regulate marriage. Traditionally, a person should not marry someone who belongs to the same clan as their mother or father. Ben Shelly, president of the Navajo Nation from 2011 to 2015, warned that the clan system was becoming too restrictive, since clan brothers and sisters might one day have no choice but to marry each other.

Before contact with Europeans, Navajo communities handled most matters at the local level. A gathering known as the Naachʼid was held as a ceremony for plentiful water and fertility, and it also served as a council in times of war and peace.

The clan leadership have served as a de facto government on the local level of the Navajo Nation. Despite today's modern form of governance that deals with legal and administrative issues, clan-based leadership is a critical aspect of the culture, as it plays an important role in fostering social unity and direction for the local branches of the tribe, especially concerning traditions and interpersonal interactions.

Clan ties also play a part in the Navajo justice system. In 1982, Navajo judges voted to create the Navajo Peacemaker Court, which later became the Peacemaking Program. In peacemaking, a leader called a naatʼáanii guides a "talking out" process by bringing together the community and clan members affected by a dispute.

==== Rejection of Indian Reorganization Act ====
In 1933, during the Great Depression, the Bureau of Indian Affairs (BIA) attempted to mitigate environmental damage due to over-grazing on reservations. Significant pushback was given by the Navajo, who did not feel that they had been sufficiently consulted before the measures were implemented. BIA Superintendent John Collier's attempt to reduce livestock herd size affected responses to his other efforts to improve conditions for Native Americans. The herds had been central to Navajo culture, and were a source of prestige.

Also during this period, under the Indian Reorganization Act (IRA) of 1934, the federal government was encouraging tribes to revive their governments according to constitutional models shaped after that of the United States. Because of the outrage and discontent about the herd issues, the Navajo voters did not trust the language of the proposed initial constitution outlined in the legislation. This contributed to their rejection of the first version of a proposed tribal constitution.

In the various attempts since, members found the process to be too cumbersome and a potential threat to tribal self-determination. The constitution was supposed to be reviewed and approved by BIA. The earliest efforts were rejected primarily because segments of the tribe did not find enough freedom in the proposed forms of government. In 1935 they feared that the proposed government would hinder development and recovery of their livestock industries; in 1953 they worried about restrictions on development of mineral resources.

They continued a government based on traditional models, with headmen chosen by clan groups.

== Language ==
On December 30, 2024, Navajo Nation President Buu Nygren made the Navajo language the official language of the Navajo Nation by signing legislation. He said: "One of my priorities coming in as President has always been to make sure that we make Navajo cool again." This is in order to promote the intergenerational preservation of the Navajo language within the Navajo Nation and intending to work in conjunction with the Diné Language Teachers Association to foster the utilization of the Navajo language. The name of the language in the Navajo tongue is Diné Bizaad. In 2025, it was reported that approximately 170,000 people speak Navajo at home.

Historically, in 1880s the language had been prohibited from being taught or spoken in mission schools. This mandate was enforced by J. D. C. Atkins, the Commissioner of Indian Affairs. This ban was later enlarged to the government-run schools located on the Navajo Nation. In 1984, teachers on the Navajo Nation began teaching students in the Navajo language as mandated by the Nation itself. The mandate stated that "The Navajo language is an essential element of the life, culture, and identity of the Navajo people...Navajo language instruction shall include to the greatest extent practicable: thinking, speaking, comprehension, reading and writing skills, and study of the formal grammar of the language."

== Navajo Nation and federal government jurisdictions ==
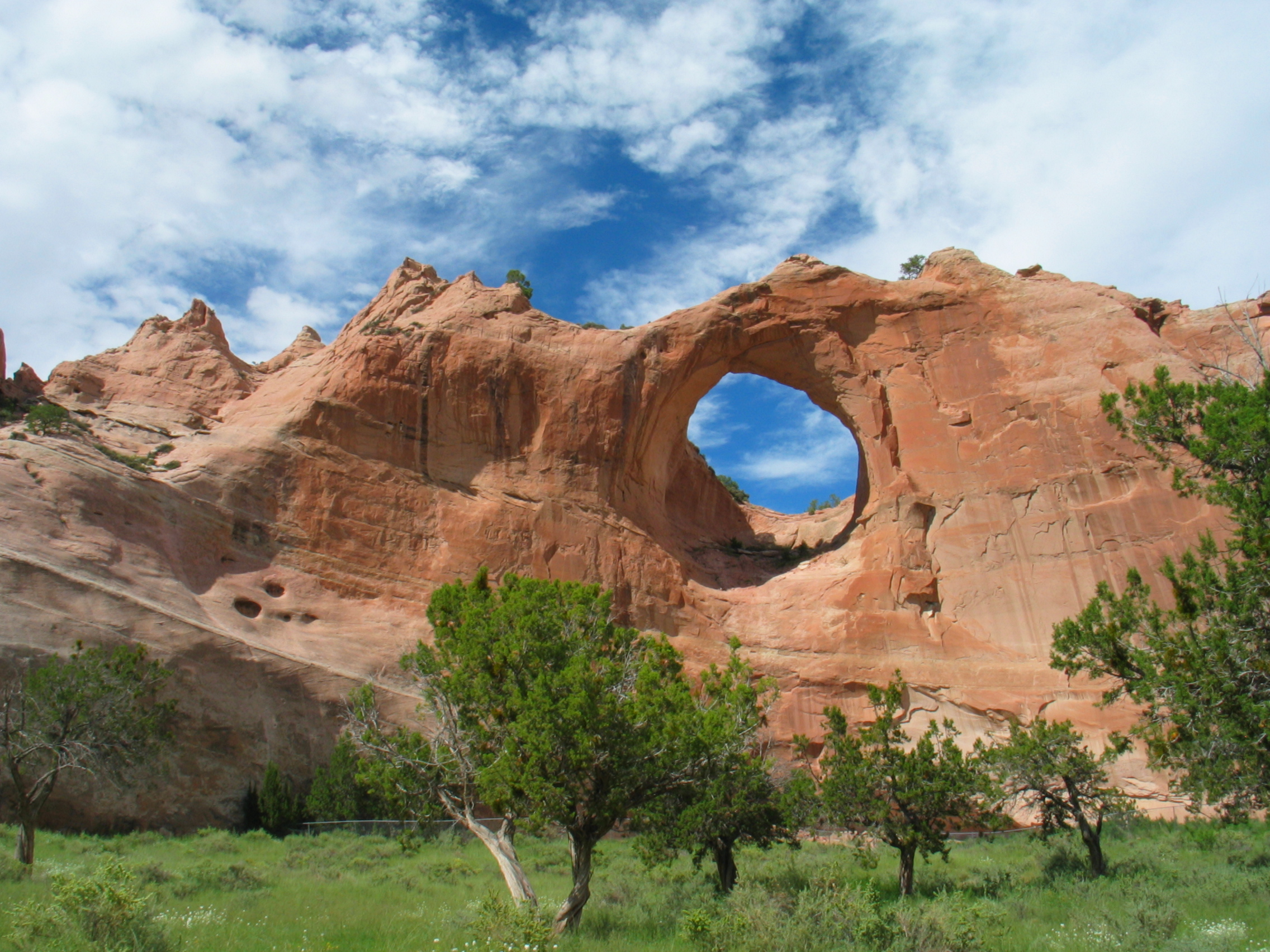
Tségháhoodzání, the "Window Rock"

The Navajo Nation must submit all proposed laws to the United States Secretary of the Interior for Secretarial Review, through the Bureau of Indian Affairs (BIA).

Most conflicts and controversies between the federal government of the United States and the Nation are settled by negotiations outlined in political agreements. The Navajo Nation Code consists of codified rules and laws of the Navajo Nation. The Navajo Nation Code has 26 titles, covering subjects from the Navajo Nation Government to Commerce and Trade to Water. The 2010 version is available on the Navajo Nation Office of Legislative Services, as well as a section for amendments beginning from January 2014 to December 2022.

A map that outlines the boundaries of the Navajo Nation is available on the Navajo Land Department's Website. Also, see Diné Land Use's website for the history of the Navajo Nation's land base. Lands within the boundaries of the Navajo Nation are composed of Public, Tribal Trust, Tribal Fee, Bureau of Land Management (BLM), Private, State, and BIA Indian Allotment Lands. Within the Arizona and Utah portions of the Navajo Nation, there are few private and BIA Indian Allotments in comparison to New Mexico's portion, which consists of a checkerboard pattern of all the aforementioned lands. The Eastern Agency, as it is referred to, consists of primarily Tribal Fee, BIA Indian Allotments, and BLM Lands. Although there are more Tribal Fee Lands in New Mexico, the Navajo Nation government intends to convert most or all Tribal Fee Lands to Tribal Trust, which has some benefits according to the Bureau of Indian Affairs.

== Government ==
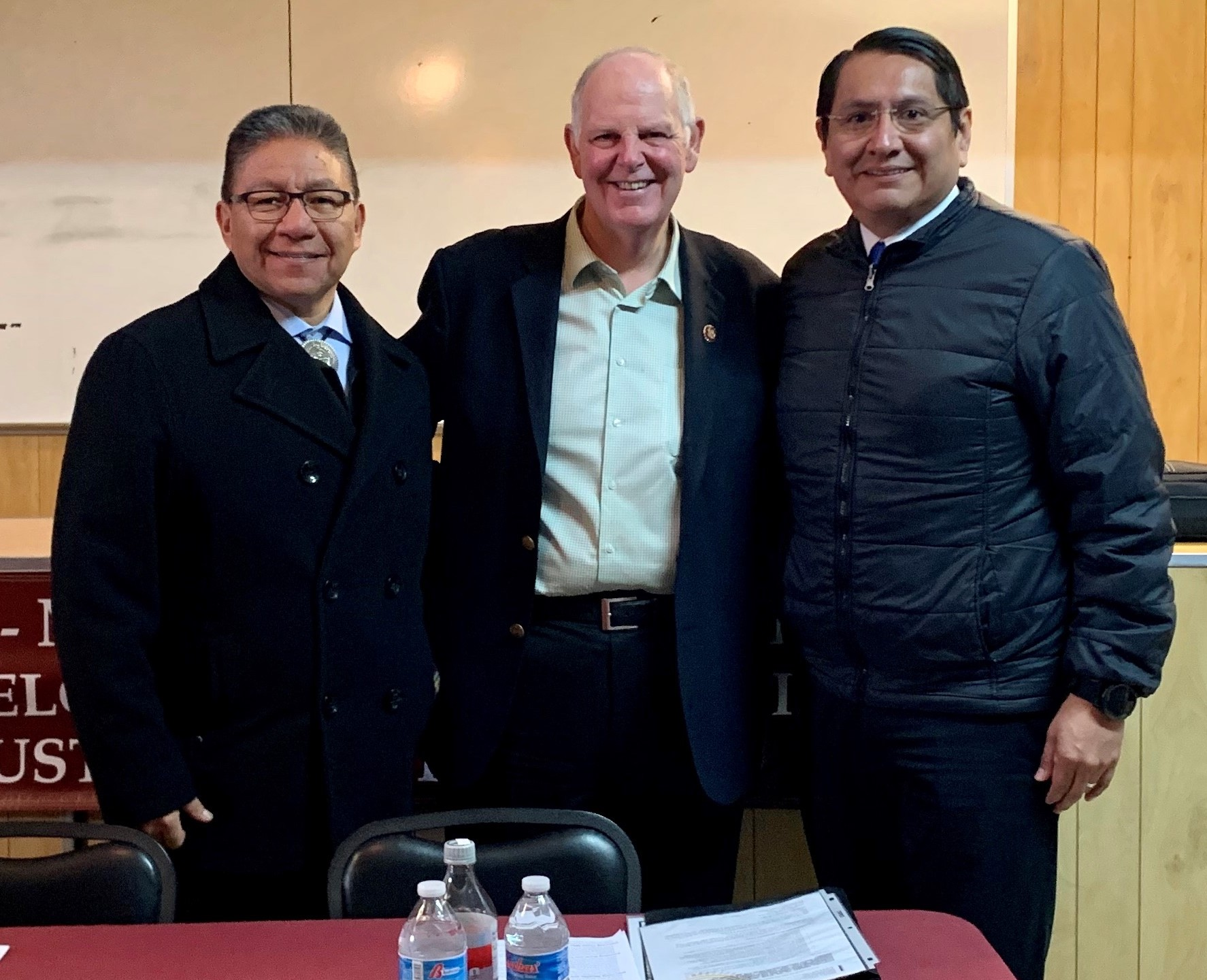
Vice President Myron Lizer, Congressman Tom O'Halleran and President Jonathan Nez in 2020

The Title II Amendment of 1989 established the Navajo Nation government as a three-part system (changes to the judicial branch had already begun in 1958). Two branches would become independent of the Navajo Nation Council, the legislative body where all government decision making was centralized before the change.

The president and vice-president are elected every four years. The Executive nominates judges of the District Courts, and the Supreme Court. The nation consists of several divisions, departments, offices, and programs as established by law.

=== Constitution ===
In 2006, a committee for a "Navajo Constitution" began advocating for a Navajo constitutional convention. The committee's goal was to have representation from every chapter on the Navajo Nation represented at a constitutional convention. The committee proposed the convention be held in the traditional naachid/modern chapter house format, where every member of the nation wishing to participate may do so through their home chapters. The committee was formed by former Navajo leaders Kelsey Begaye, Peterson Zah, Peter MacDonald, Ivan Gamble (a writer/social activist), and other local political activists.

=== Judiciary branch ===
Prior to the Long Walk of the Navajo, judicial powers were exercised by peace chiefs (Hózhǫ́ǫ́jí Naatʼááh) in a mediation-style process. While the people were held at Bosque Redondo, the U.S. Army handled severe crimes. Lesser crimes and disputes remained in the purview of the villages' chiefs. After the Navajo return from Bosque Redondo in 1868, listed criminal offenses were handled by the U.S. Indian Agent of the Bureau of Indian Affairs with support of the U.S. Army, while lesser disputes remained under Navajo control.

In 1892, BIA Agent David L. Shipley established the Navajo Court of Indian Offenses and appointed judges. Previously, judicial authority was exercised by the Indian Agent.

In 1950, the Navajo Tribal Council decided that judges should be elected. By the time of the judicial reorganization of 1958, the council had determined that, due to problems with delayed decisions and partisan politics, appointment was a better method of selecting judges.

The president makes appointments, subject to confirmation by the Navajo Nation Council; however, the president is limited to the list of names vetted by the Judiciary Committee of the council.

The current judicial system for the Navajo Nation was created by the Navajo Tribal Council on 16 October 1958. It established a separate branch of government, the "Judicial Branch of the Navajo Nation Government", which became effective 1 April 1959. The Navajo Court of Indian Offenses was eliminated; the sitting judges became judges in the new system. The resolution established "Trial Courts of the Navajo Tribe" and the "Navajo Tribal Court of Appeals", which was the highest tribal court and its only appellate court.

In 1978, the Navajo Tribal Council established a "Supreme Judicial Council", a political body rather than a court. On a discretionary basis, it could hear appeals from the Navajo Tribal Court of Appeals. Subsequently, the Supreme Judicial Council was criticized for bringing politics directly into the judicial system and undermining "impartiality, fairness and equal protection".

In December 1985, the Navajo Tribal Council passed the Judicial Reform Act of 1985, which eliminated the Supreme Judicial Council. It redefined the "Navajo Tribal Court of Appeals" as the "Navajo Nation Supreme Court", and redefined "Trial Courts of the Navajo Tribe" as "District Courts of the Navajo Nation". Navajo courts are governed by Title 7, "Courts and Procedures", of the Navajo Tribal Code.

From 1988 to 2006, there were seven judicial districts and two satellite courts. As of 2010, there are ten judicial districts, centered respectively in Alamo (Alamo/Tó'hajiilee), Aneth, Chinle, Crownpoint, Dilkon, Kayenta, Ramah, Shiprock, Tuba City and Window Rock. All of the districts also have family courts, which have jurisdiction over domestic relations, civil relief in domestic violence, child custody and protection, name changes, quiet title, and probate. As of 2010, there were 17 trial judges presiding in the Navajo district and family courts.

=== Executive branch ===
The Navajo Nation Presidency, in its current form, was created on December 15, 1989, after directives from the federal government guided the Tribal Council to establish the current judicial, legislative, and executive model. This was a departure from the system of "Council and Chairmanship" from the previous government body.

Conceptual additions were made to the language of Navajo Nation Code Title II, and the acts expanded the new government on April 1, 1990. Qualifications for the position of president include fluency in the Navajo language (this has seldom been enforced and in 2015 the council changed the law to repeal this requirement). Term limits allow only two consecutive terms.

=== Legislative branch ===
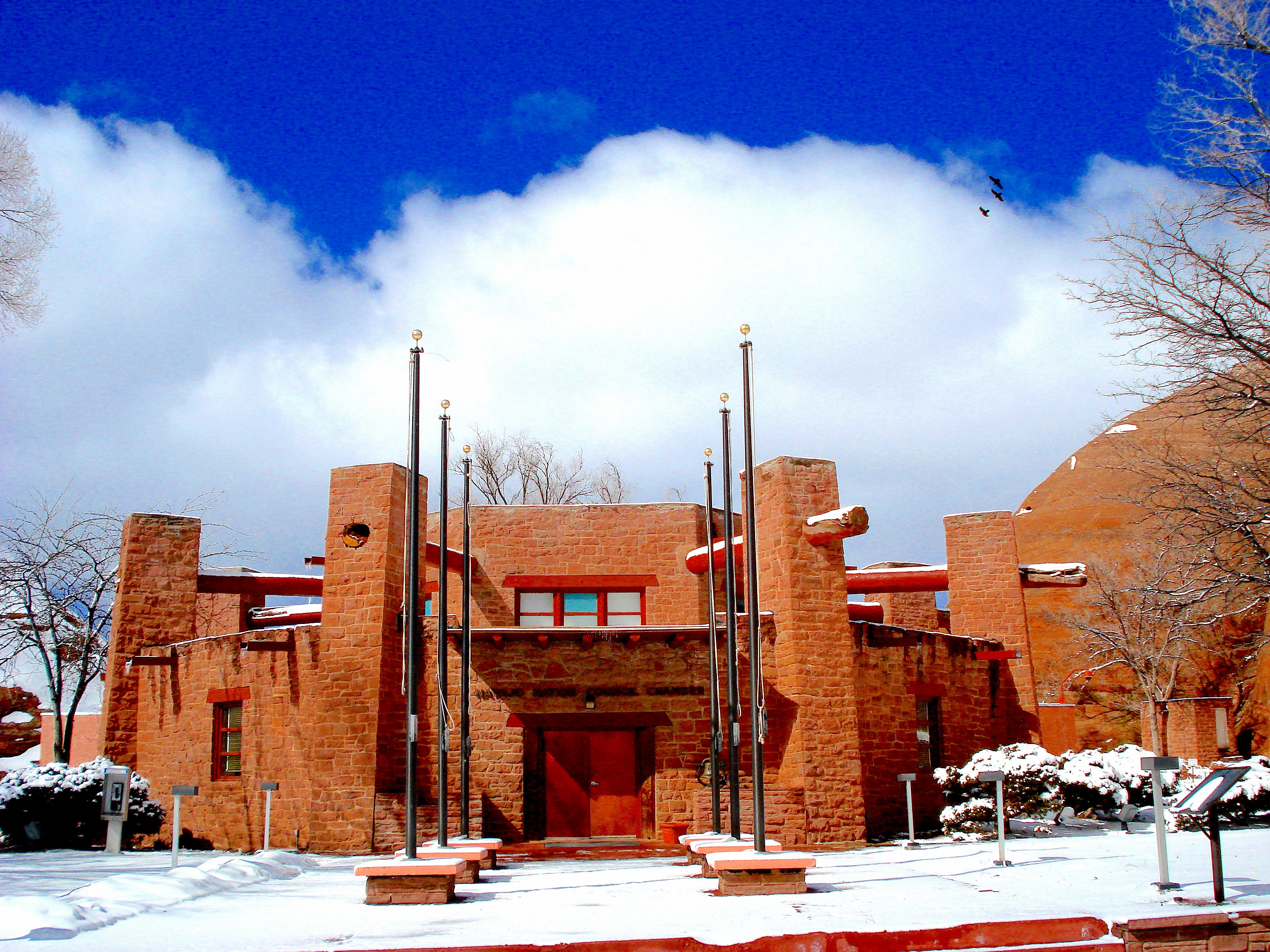
Navajo Nation Council Chamber, a National Historic Landmark

The Navajo Nation Council, formerly the Navajo Tribal Council, is the legislative branch of the Navajo Nation. As of 2010, the Navajo Nation Council consists of 24 delegates, representing the 110 chapters, elected every four years by registered Navajo voters. Prior to the November 2010 election, the Navajo Nation Council consisted of 88 representatives. The Navajo voted for the change in an effort to have a more efficient government and to curb tribal government corruption associated with council members who established secure seats.

==== Chapters ====
In 1927, agents of the U.S. federal government initiated a new form of local government entities called Chapters, modeled after jurisdictional governments in the US such as counties or townships. Each chapter elected officers and followed parliamentary procedures.

By 1933, more than 100 chapters operated across the Navajo Nation. The chapters served as liaisons between the Navajo and the federal governments, respectively. They also acted as voting precincts for the election of tribal council delegates. They served as forums for local tribal leaders but the chapters had no authority within the structure of the Navajo Nation government.

In 1998, the Navajo Tribal Council passed the "Local Governance Act" (LGA), which expanded the political roles of the existing 110 chapters. It authorized them to make decisions on behalf of the chapter members and to take over certain roles previously delegated to the council and executive branches. This included entering into intergovernmental agreements with federal, state and tribal entities, subject to approval by the Intergovernmental Relations Committee of the council. As of 2006, 44 chapters were LGA certified.

=== Administrative divisions ===
==== Agencies and chapters ====
The Navajo Nation is divided into five agencies. The seat of government is located at the Navajo Governmental Campus in Window Rock/Tségháhoodzání. These agencies are composed of several chapters each, and reflect the five Bureau of Indian Affairs (BIA) agencies created in the early formation of the Navajo Nation.

The five agencies within the Navajo Nation are Chinle Agency in Chinle, Arizona; Eastern Navajo Agency in Crownpoint, New Mexico; Western Navajo Agency in Tuba City, Arizona; Fort Defiance Agency in Fort Defiance, Arizona; and Shiprock Agency in Shiprock, New Mexico. The BIA agencies provide various technical services under direction of the BIA's Navajo Area Office at Gallup, New Mexico.

Agencies are divided into chapters as the smallest political unit, similar to municipalities or small U.S. counties. The Navajo capital city of Window Rock is located in the chapter of St. Michaels, Arizona.

The Navajo Nation also operates executive offices in Washington, D.C. to facilitate government-to-government relations and for lobbying services and congressional relations.

==== Departments and divisions ====
===== Law enforcement =====
Navajo law enforcement consists of approximately 180 tribal police officers as of 2023.

Certain classes of crimes, such as capital cases, are prosecuted and adjudicated in Federal courts. However, the Navajo Nation operates its own divisions of law enforcement via the Navajo Division of Public Safety, commonly referred to as the Navajo Nation Police (formerly Navajo Tribal Police). Law enforcement functions are also delegated to the Navajo Nation Department of Fish and Wildlife: Wildlife Law Enforcement and Animal Control Sections; Navajo Nation Forestry Law Enforcement Officers; and the Navajo Nation EPA Criminal Enforcement Section; and Navajo Nation Resource Enforcement (Navajo Rangers).

Other local, state and federal law enforcement agencies routinely work on the Navajo Nation, including the BIA Police, National Park Service U.S. Park Rangers, U.S. Forest Service Law Enforcement and Investigations, Bureau of Land Management Law Enforcement, Drug Enforcement Administration (DEA), US Marshals, Federal Bureau of Investigation as well as other Native American units such as the Ute Mountain Agency and the Hopi Agency plus Arizona Highway Patrol, Utah Highway Patrol, New Mexico Department of Public Safety (State Police and Highway Patrol), Apache County Sheriff's Office, Navajo County Sheriff's Office, McKinley County Sheriff's Office.

===== Other agencies =====
- Transportation
- Health
- Education
- Navajo Nation Parks & Recreation

==== Regional Commissions ====
Regional government functions are carried out by the "District Grazing Committees" and "Off-Reservation Land Boards", "Major Irrigation Projects Farm Boards", and "Agency Councils."

=== Politics ===
==== Notable Navajo politicians ====
- Henry Chee Dodge, first chairman of Navajo Tribal Council (1922–1928, 1942–1946)
- Tom B. Becenti, tribal judge and chapter official from Eastern Navajo Agency. WWII veteran. He is known to have helped develop the Navajo Tribal Court System while preserving traditional Navajo Fundamental Law.
- Peter MacDonald, Navajo Tribal chairman removed for cause and convicted of crimes (1971–1983, 1987–1989)
- Jacob (JC) Morgan, first chairman elected by the tribe, serving 1938–1942
- Lilakai Julian Neil, first woman elected to Navajo Tribal Council, serving 1946–1951
- John Pinto, New Mexico state senator (1977–2019), code talker and military veteran, teacher and National Education Association organizer
- Amos Frank Singer, early Council delegate from Kaibito and designer of Navajo Seal
- Joe Shirley Jr., oversaw the reduction in seats on the Navajo Council
- Annie Dodge Wauneka, Navajo Tribal councilwoman and philanthropist (1951–1978)
- Peterson Zah, chairman and first president of the Navajo Nation (1983–1987, 1991–1995)

==== Infrastructure ====
The Navajo Tribal Utility Authority provides utility services for houses. By 2019, it was conducting a campaign to electrify remaining houses without electricity. As of 2019 about 15,000 houses, with 60,000 residents, did not have electricity; at that time the authority electrified, on an annual basis, 400–450 houses. The Navajo Nation has thirteen grocery stores, twelve health facilities, 170 hospital beds, thirteen intensive care unit beds, fifty-two isolation rooms, and twenty-eight ventilators.

Coconino County installed a Wi-Fi hotspot between the Page Magistrate Court Buildings and Coconino County Health and Human Services Northern Region Office at 467 Vista Ave. in Page, Arizona. While remaining in a vehicle, this hotspot, named CountyWi-Fi, is freely accessible and does not require a network password. Northern Arizona University (NAU), with clearance from Navajo and Hopi officials, extended free wi-fi signals to parking lots on the Navajo Nation for any college and K-12 student. Coconino County offers assistance for rent and utilities based on income eligibility. Assistance may be granted for electric, gas, wood, water, propane, rental, or utility deposits when moving.

==== International cooperation ====
In December 2012, Ben Shelly led a delegation of Navajo overseas to Israel, where they toured the country as representatives for the Navajo people. In April 2013, Shelly's aide, Deswood Tome, led a delegation of Israeli agricultural specialists on a tour of resources on the Navajo Nation. The visit by Israelis was criticized by some indigenous people who believe that Palestinians in Israel have a status similar to their own.

In 2020, Ireland donated to the Navajo and Hopi Nations during the COVID-19 pandemic in a program called "pay it forward". A GoFundMe page was created to help the Hopi and Navajo tribes fight COVID-19. It raised over four million dollars, with tens of thousands coming from Irish donors. At the time, the Navajo and Hopi tribes had the highest rates of COVID-19 outside of New York and New Jersey. The communications director for the fundraiser, Cassandra Begay, attempted to spread awareness through Twitter. Chief of the Choctaw Nation, Gary Batton, responded to these donations, saying "We have become kindred spirits with the Irish in the years since the Irish potato famine. We hope the Irish, Navajo and Hopi peoples develop lasting friendships, as we have."

== Geography ==
Map showing populated places on the Navajo Nation and surrounding area

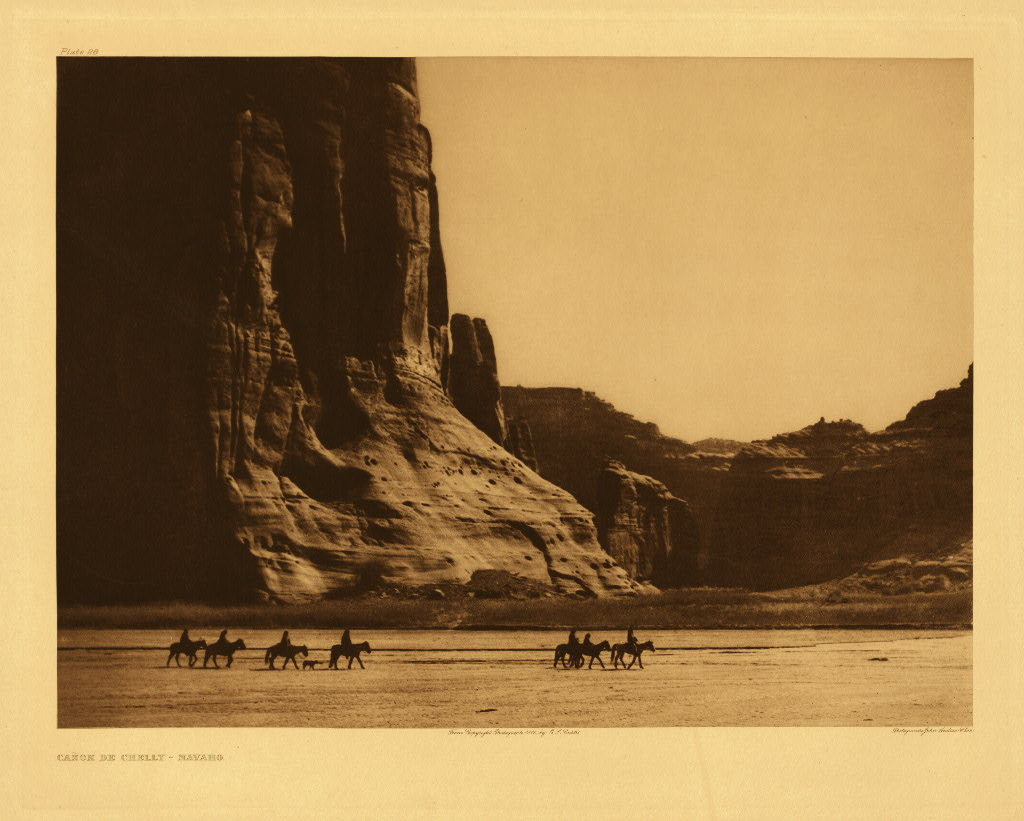
Navajo. Seven riders on horseback and dog trek against background of canyon cliffs. Edward S. Curtis (1904)

The land area of the Navajo Nation is over 27,000 square miles (70,000 km^{2}), making it the largest Indian reservation in the United States; it is approximately 8,000 km^{2} larger than the state of West Virginia.

Adjacent to or near the Navajo Nation are the Southern Ute of Colorado, and the Ute Mountain Ute Tribe of Colorado, Utah, and New Mexico, both along the northern borders; the Jicarilla Apache Tribe to the east; the Zuni Pueblo and White Mountain Apache to the south; and the Hualapai Bands in the west. The Navajo Nation's territory fully surrounds the Hopi Indian Reservation.

In the 1980s, a conflict over shared lands peaked when the Department of the Interior attempted to relocate Navajo residents living in what is still referred to as the Navajo–Hopi Joint Use Area. The litigious and social conflict between the two tribes and neighboring communities ended with "The Bennett Freeze" Agreement, completed in July 2009 by President Barack Obama. The agreement lessened the contentious land disagreement by providing a 75-year lease to Navajo who had land claims dating to before the US occupation of the territory.

Situated on the Navajo Nation are Canyon de Chelly National Monument, Monument Valley, Rainbow Bridge National Monument, the Shiprock monadnock, and the eastern portion of the Grand Canyon. Navajo Territory in New Mexico is popularly referred as the "Checkerboard" area because it is interrupted by Navajo and non-Native fee ownership of numerous plots of land. In this area, Navajo lands are intermingled with fee lands, owned by both Navajo and non-Navajo, and federal and state lands under various jurisdictions. Three large non-contiguous sections located in New Mexico are also under Navajo jurisdiction: these are the Ramah Navajo Indian Reservation, the Alamo Navajo Indian Reservation, and the Tohajiilee Indian Reservation near Albuquerque.

=== Climate ===
Much of the Navajo Nation is situated on the Colorado Plateau. The large variation in altitude (3,080 to 10,346 feet; 939 to 3,153 m) throughout the Navajo Nation produces considerable variations in climate, from an arid, desert climate, accounting for 55% of the area, through an intermediate steppe region, to the cold, sub-humid climate of the mountainous 8% of the area. Average daily temperatures range from 43 to 60 °F (6 to 16 °C), with a low of 4 °F (−16 °C) in mountainous regions and a high of 110 °F (43 °C) in the desert. Average rainfall is 16–27 inches (410–690 mm) at higher elevations, and 7–11 inches (180–280 mm) in the desert.

=== Daylight saving time ===
The Navajo Nation observes daylight saving time (DST) on its Arizona land as well as on its Utah and New Mexico lands. However, the rest of Arizona does not observe DST, including the Hopi Reservation, an enclave within the Arizona portion of the Nation.

== Demographics ==
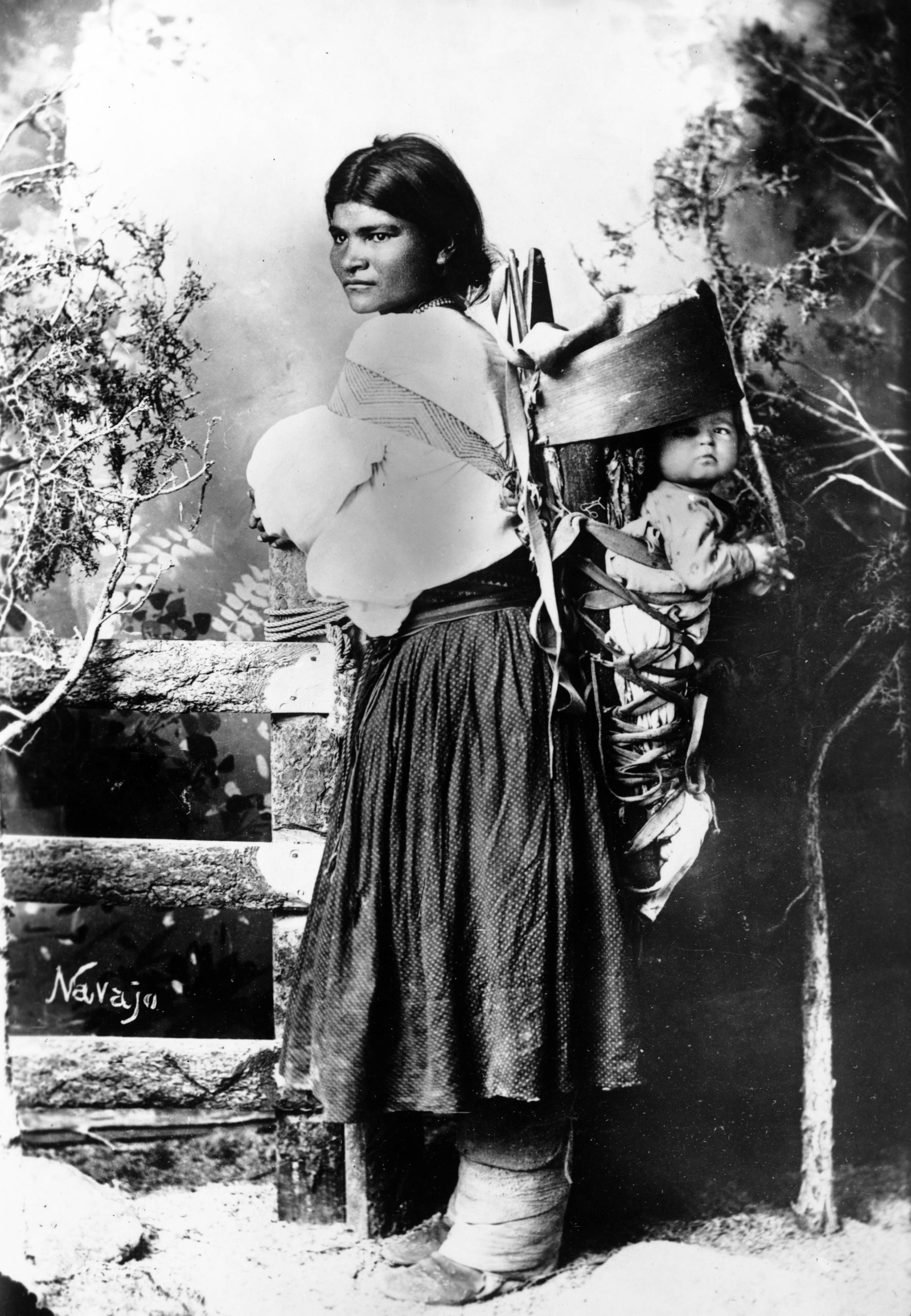
Navajo woman and child, c. 1880–1910

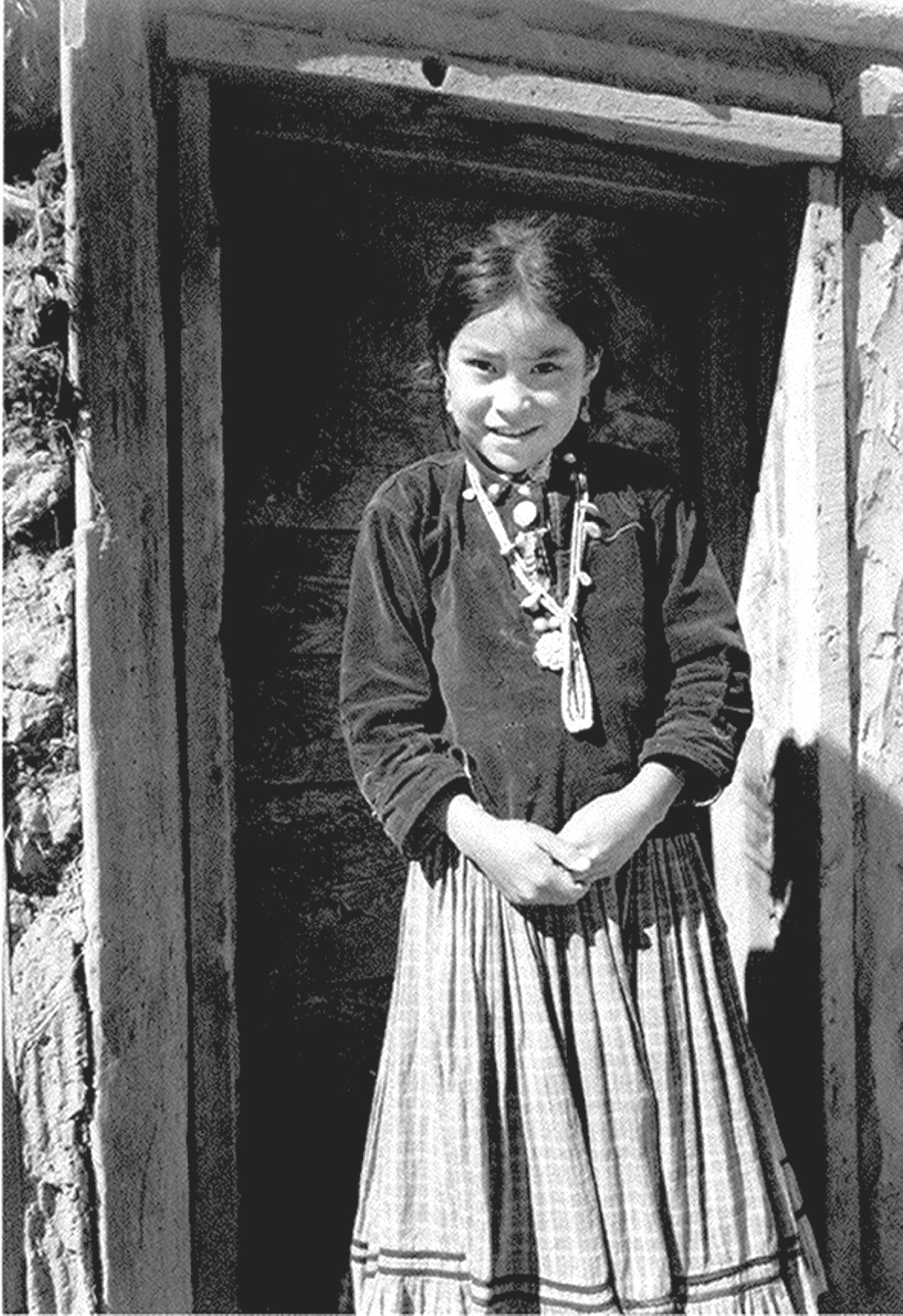
Navajo girl Canyon de Chelly, (1941) Ansel Adams

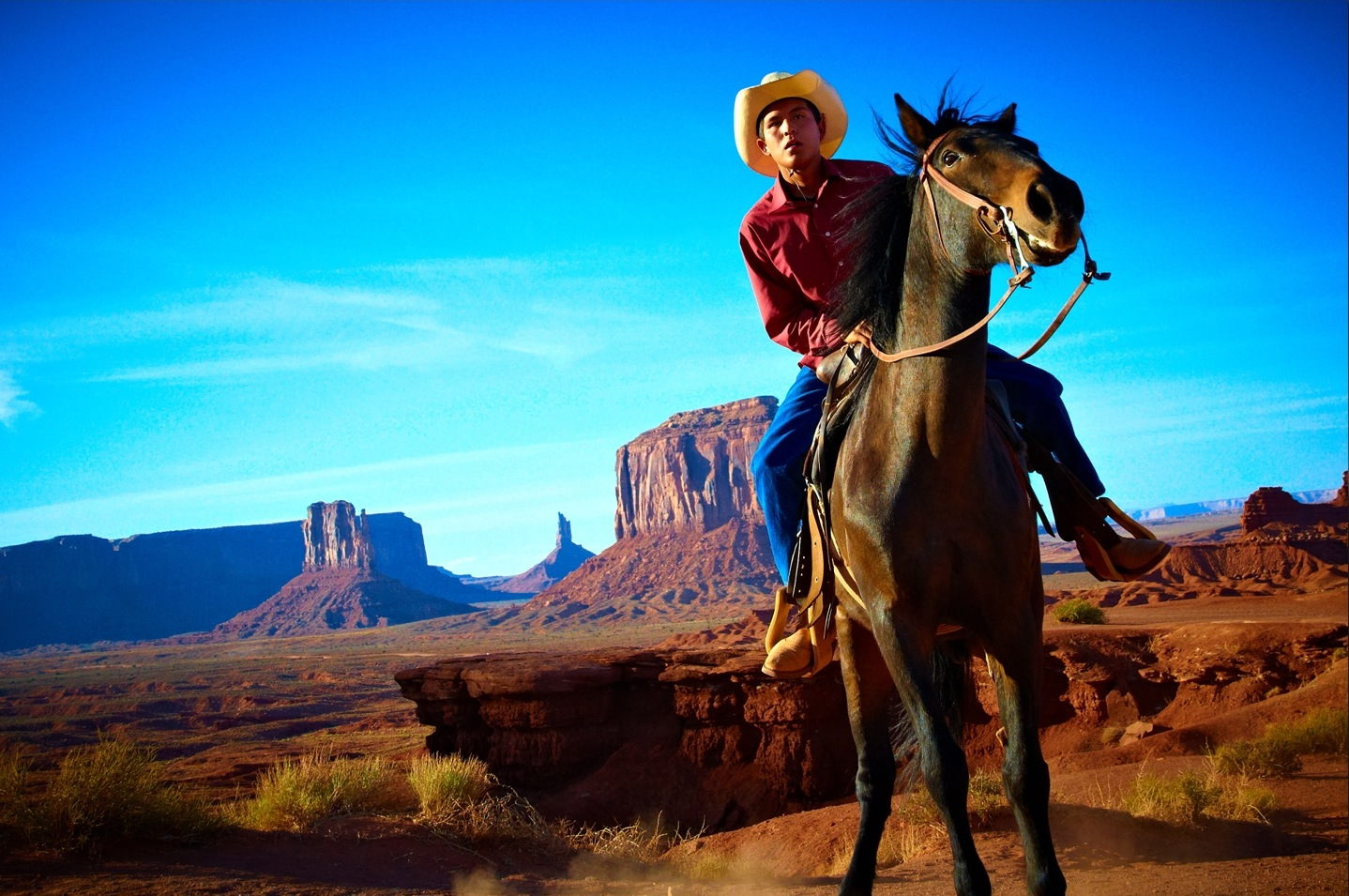
A Navajo man on horseback in Monument Valley

On the 2010 census, 166,826 residents identified as Navajo or other Native American, 3,249 as White/European American, 401 Asian or Pacific Islanders, 208 African American, and the remainder identify as some other group or more than one ancestry. The 2010 census recorded 109,963 individuals who report speaking a language at home that is neither Asian nor Indo-European. DiscoverNavajo.com reports that 96% of the Navajo Nation is American Indian, and 66% of Navajo tribe members live on Navajo Nation.

The average family size was 4.1, and the average household was home to 3.5 persons. The average household income in 2010 was $27,389.

Nearly half of the enrolled members of the Navajo tribe live outside the nationʼs territory, and the total enrolled population is 300,048, as of July 2011. As of 2016, 173,667 Diné lived on tribal lands.

== Education ==
Historically, the Navajo Nation resisted compulsory western education, including boarding schools, as imposed by the government in the aftermath of the Long Walk. Navajo families and society have provided traditional and home education with considerable scope and depth since before the U.S. annexation.

Continued education and retention of Navajo students in school are significant challenges. Major problems faced by the Nations relates to helping students improve their grades and to prevent a very high drop-out rate among high school students. Over 150 public, private, and Bureau of Indian Affairs schools serve Nation students from kindergarten through high school. Most schools are funded from the Navajo Nation under the Johnson O'Malley program.

The Nation runs community Head Start programs, the only ones in the field of education fully operated by the Navajo Nation government. Post-secondary education and vocational training are available on and off the territory.

The Navajo Nation operates Tséhootsooí Diné Bi'ólta', a Navajo-language immersion school for grades K–8 in Fort Defiance, Arizona. Located on the Arizona-New Mexico border in the southeastern quarter of the Navajo Nation, the school strives to revitalize Navajo among children of the Window Rock Unified School District. Tséhootsooí Diné Bi'ólta' has thirteen Navajo language teachers who instruct only in the Navajo language. Five English language teachers instruct in the English language. Kindergarten and first grade are taught completely in the Navajo language, while English is incorporated into the program during third grade, when it is used for about 10% of instruction.

=== Primary and secondary education ===
The Nation has access to six systems of primary and secondary academic institutions that serve Navajo students, including:

- Arizona public schools
- New Mexico public schools
- Utah public schools
- Bureau of Indian Education-operated public schools
- Association of Navajo-controlled schools
- Navajo Preparatory School, Inc.
- Catholic Schools

=== Diné College – Tsaile campus ===
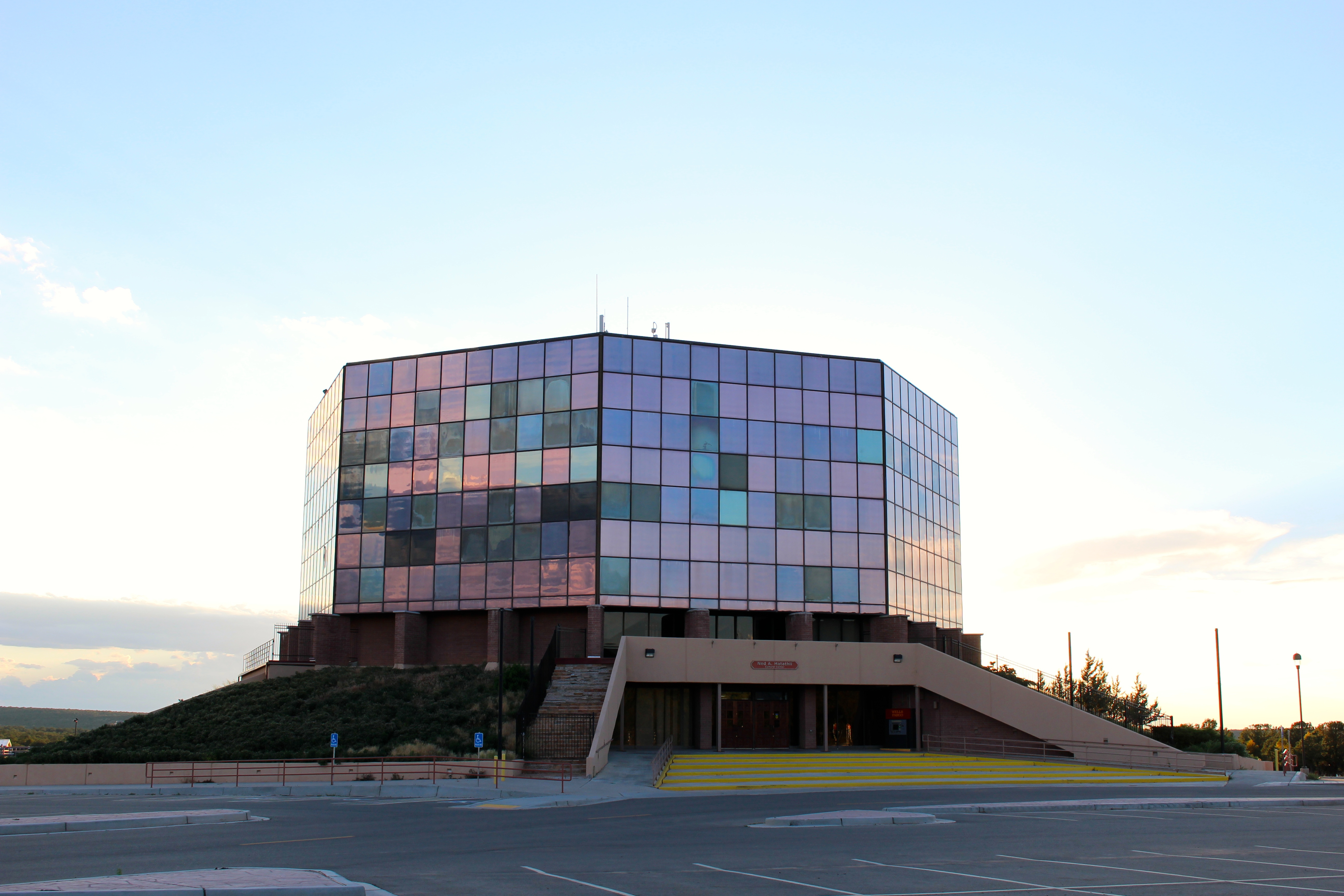
The Ned A Hataałi Center at Diné College's Tsaile campus

The Navajo Nation operates Diné College, a two-year tribal community college, with its main campus at Tsaile in Apache County, Arizona. The college also operates seven sub-campuses throughout the nation. The Navajo Nation Council founded the college in 1968 as the first tribal college in the United States. Since then, tribal colleges have been established on numerous reservations and now total 32. Diné College has 1,830 students enrolled, of which 210 are students seeking transfer to four-year institutions in order to earn bachelor's degrees.

==== Center for Diné Studies ====
The college includes the Center for Diné Studies. Its goal is to apply Navajo Sa'ah Naagháí Bik'eh Hózhóón principles to advance quality student learning through Nitsáhákees (thinking), Nahat'á (planning), Iiná (living), and Siihasin (assurance) in study of the Diné language, history, and culture.

=== Navajo Technical University (NTU) ===
Located in Crownpoint, New Mexico, Navajo Technical University is a tribal university offering various vocational, technical, and academic degrees and certificates. NTU was opened in 1979 as the Navajo Skill Center, intended to provide opportunity to unemployed people of the Navajo Nation. The center has since been renamed multiple times in response to growth and its changing programs. In 1985, it was renamed to Crownpoint Institute of Technology; in 2006, it was renamed again to Navajo Technical College. Finally, in 2013, it was designated a "university" in recognition of its program expansion, under resolution codified by the Navajo Nation Council.

=== Navajo Preparatory School ===
Navajo Preparatory School is located in Farmington, New Mexico, on a small patch of land owned by the Navajo Nation. It is the only Navajo-sanctioned college-preparatory school for Native Americans, and it offers International Baccalaureate programs.

== Environmental and health concerns ==
=== Uranium mining ===
Extensive uranium mining took place in areas of the Navajo Nation from the 1940s, and stringent worker and environmental safety laws were not passed and enforced until the early 1960s.

Studies have proven uranium mining created severe environmental consequences for miners and nearby residents. Several types of cancer occur at much higher rates than the national average in these locations. Especially high are the rates of reproductive-organ cancers in teenage Navajo girls, which are 17 times the national average for teenage girls. In 1990, Congress passed the Radiation Exposure Compensation Act.

Residents of the Red Water Pond Road area have requested relocation to a new, off-grid village to be located on Standing Black Tree Mesa. Cleanup is underway on the Northeast Church Rock Mine Superfund site. They proposed this as an alternative to the EPA-proposed relocation of residents to Gallup.

==== Navajo neurohepatopathology ====
The Navajo are uniquely affected by a rare and life-threatening autosomal recessive multi-system disorder called Navajo Neurohepatopathology (NNH). This genetic condition is estimated to occur in one of every 1,600 live births. The most severe symptoms include neuropathy and liver dysfunction (hepatopathy), both of which may be moderate and progressive or severe and fatal, as it often is in cases that develop in infants (before six months of age) or children (1–5 years). Other symptoms include corneal anesthesia and scarring, injuries due to lack of sensation, cerebral leukoencephalopathy, failure to thrive, and recurrent metabolic acidosis, with intercurrent infections.

=== Diabetes ===
Diabetes mellitus is a major health problem among the Navajo, Hopi and Pima nations, whose members were diagnosed at a rate about four times higher than the age-standardized U.S. estimate. Medical researchers believe increased consumption of carbohydrates, coupled with genetic factors, play significant roles in the prevalence of this chronic disease among Native Americans.

=== Severe combined immunodeficiency ===
One in every 2,500 children in the Navajo population inherits severe combined immunodeficiency (SCID). This genetic disorder results in births of children with virtually no immune system. In the general population, the genetic disorder is much rarer, affecting one in 100,000 children. The disorder is sometimes known as "bubble boy disease". This condition is a significant cause of illness and death among Navajo children. Research reveals a similar genetic pattern among the related Apache.

In a December 2007 Associated Press article, Mortan Cowan, director of the Pediatric Bone Marrow Transplant Program at the University of California, San Francisco, noted that, although researchers have identified about a dozen genes that cause SCID, the Navajo/Apache population has the most severe form of the disorder. This is due to the mutations in the gene DCLRE1C, which leads to a defective copy of the protein Artemis. Without the gene, children's bodies are unable to repair DNA or develop disease-fighting cells.

=== COVID-19 pandemic ===
The COVID-19 pandemic was first documented in the Navajo Nation on March 17, 2020. On March 20, a stay-at-home order was issued after 14 cases of COVID-19 were confirmed, with an 8 p.m. to 5 a.m. curfew enforced. Beginning April 12, a 57-hour weekend curfew was declared. At that point, there were 698 confirmed cases of COVID-19, including 24 deaths, among members of the Navajo Nation living in New Mexico, Arizona and Utah. On April 19, the Navajo Department of Health issued an emergency public health order mandating the use of masks outside the home, in addition to existing orders for sheltering in place and for nightly and weekend curfews.

By April 20, the Navajo Nation had the third-highest infection rate in the United States, after those of New York and New Jersey. On May 18, it surpassed New York as most affected U.S. region per capita, with 4,071 positive COVID-19 tests and 142 fatalities recorded.

On April 25, the Nation announced that it was joining ten other tribes in a lawsuit against the U.S. Secretary of the Treasury, over what the plaintiffs said was an unfair allocation of money under the Coronavirus Aid, Relief, and Economic Security Act (CARES Act). On May 5, $600 million of aid money was delivered to the Navajo Nation, a month after the legislation was signed into law.

As of February 2022, there had been 50,428 confirmed cases of COVID-19 in the Navajo Nation, and 1,619 deaths associated with the virus.

=== Water rights and protection ===
Water rights for the Navajo Nation have been a source of environmental conflict for decades, as Navajo lands have provided energy and water for residents of neighboring states while many of the Navajo do not have electricity or running water in their homes. Beginning in the 1960s, coal mining by Peabody coal at Black Mesa withdrew more than 3 million gallons of water/day from the Navajo aquifer, reducing the number of springs on the reservation. The Navajo Generating Station also consumed about 11 billion gallons of water per year to provide power for the Central Arizona Project that pumps water from Lake Havasu into Arizona.

Native American tribes along the Colorado River were left out of the 1922 Colorado River Compact that divided water among the states, forcing tribes to negotiate settlements with the states for water. The Navajo negotiated water settlements with New Mexico and Utah in 2009 and 2020 respectively, but had not reached an agreement with Arizona in 2023.

On June 22, 2023, the US Supreme Court ruled in Arizona v. Navajo Nation that the federal government of the United States has no obligation to ensure that the Navajo Nation has access to water. The court ruled that the 1868 treaty establishing the Navajo Reservation reserved necessary water to accomplish the purpose of the Navajo Reservation but did not require the United States to take affirmative steps to secure water for the Tribe.

Additionally, environmental crises, such as the 2015 Gold King Mine waste water spill have had lasting impact on the Nation's access to clean water.

== Economy ==
Number of sheep (dibé) present on the Navajo Nation

The Navajo economy and culture have long been based on the raising of sheep and goats. Navajo families process the wool and sell it for cash or spin it into yarn and weave blankets and rugs for sale. The Navajo are also noted for their skill in creating turquoise and silver jewelry. Navajo artists have other traditional arts, such as sand painting, sculpture and pottery.

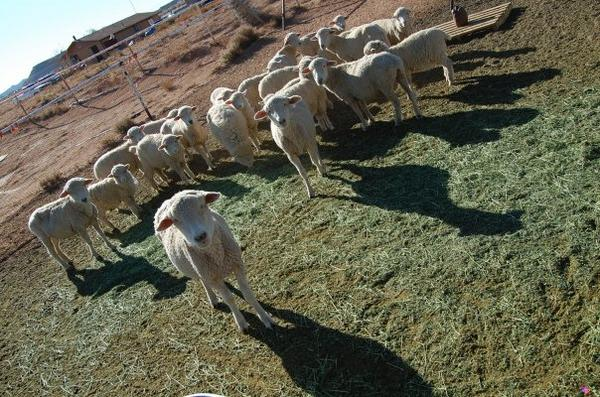
Sheep remain an important aspect of Navajo culture and economy.

The Navajo Nation has created a mixture of industry and business that has provided the Navajo with alternative opportunities to traditional occupations. The Nation's median cash household income is around $20,000 per year. However, using federal standards, unemployment levels fluctuate between 40 and 45%. About 40% of families live below the federal poverty rate.

Economic development within the Navajo Nation has fluctuated over its history but has largely remained limited. One obstacle to investment has been the incompatibility of its two land management systems. Tribal lands are held in common and leased to individuals for specific purposes, such as home construction or for livestock grazing. Financial institutions outside of tribal lands require assets, including land, to be used as collateral when potential borrowers seek capital. Since individuals do not own the land outright, financial institutions have little recourse if borrowers default on their loans. Additionally, the wide-ranging bureaucracy involving elements of the U.S. Department of Interior, the Bureau of Indian Affairs, and the tribal government has created a complex network that is cumbersome and time-consuming for investors and businesses to navigate.

Self-employed Navajo workers and Navajo entrepreneurs are often involved in the grey economy. For instance, artisans staff roadside shops and cater to American and international tourists, travelers passing through Navajo Nation, and to the Navajo people themselves. Other Navajo workers find employment in the nearby cities and towns of Page, Arizona; Flagstaff, Arizona; Farmington, New Mexico; Gallup, New Mexico; Cortez, Colorado; and other towns along the I-40 corridor. Commute times vary for these workers. Because of the remoteness of some Navajo communities, they can last up to several hours. Economic push-pull factors have led a sizable portion of the workforce to temporarily or permanently relocate to these border towns or to large metropolitan areas further away, such as Phoenix, Arizona; Albuquerque, New Mexico; Los Angeles, California; Chicago, Illinois; Denver, Colorado; and Salt Lake City, Utah.

Navajo college students and graduates studying at universities in cities and towns outside the reservation may elect to stay there rather than return to the Navajo Nation because of the relative abundance of employment opportunities, connections with other classmates, and higher quality of life. This phenomenon contributes to human capital flight or "the brain drain", where highly skilled or highly educated individuals are attracted or pushed to a location with different or more economic opportunities. They are not incorporated into the community and local economy of origin.

The tribe has grown peaches (Prunus persica) since the 1700s. In the late 1800s the Bureau of Indian Affairs began to discourage traditional methods of peach growing. Wytsalucy (2019) genotyped some of the trees and distinguished them from those grown elsewhere. Wytsalucy's analysis illuminates the different course that Navajo breeding of peach has taken from peach breeding elsewhere.

=== Natural resources ===
Mining – especially of coal and uranium – provided significant income to both the Navajo Nation and individual Navajos in the second half of the 20th century. Many of these mines have closed. However, in the early 21st century, mining still provides significant revenues to the tribe in terms of leases (51% of all tribal income in 2003). Navajos are among the 1,000 people employed in mining.

==== Coal ====
The volume of coal mined on the Navajo Nation land has declined in the early 21st century.

Peabody Energy's Black Mesa coal mine, a controversial strip mine, was shut down in December 2005 because of its adverse environmental impacts. It lost an appeal in January 2010 to reopen.

The Black Mesa mine fed the 1.5 GW Mohave Power Station at Laughlin, Nevada, via a slurry pipeline that used water from the Black Mesa aquifer. The nearby Kayenta Mine used the Black Mesa & Lake Powell Railroad to move coal to the former Navajo Generating Station (2.2 GW) at Page, Arizona. The Kayenta mine provided the majority of leased revenues for the tribe. The Kayenta mine also provided wages to those Navajo who were among its 400 employees.

The Chevron Corporation's P&M McKinley Mine was the first large-scale, surface coal mine in New Mexico when it opened in 1961. It closed in January 2010.

The Navajo Mine opened in 1963 near Fruitland, New Mexico, and employs about 350 people. It supplies sub-bituminous coal to the 2 GW Four Corners Power Plant via the isolated 13-mile Navajo Mine Railroad. Parts of the Navajo Nation, through the Navajo Transitional Energy Company, acquired the mine and three mines in Montana and Wyoming.

The Navajo Nation has been working towards a transition away from coal energy with the aid of environmental activists in Diné CARE, which led to the cancellation of the proposed Desert Rock Power Plant in 2011, and the shutdown of the Navajo Generating Station in 2019.

==== Uranium ====
The uranium market, which was active during and after the Second World War, slowed near the end of that period. The Navajo Nation has suffered considerable environmental contamination and health effects as a result of poor regulation of uranium mining in that period. As of 2005, the Navajo Nation has prohibited uranium mining altogether within its borders.

==== Oil and natural gas ====
There are developed and potential oil and gas fields on the Navajo Nation. The oldest and largest group of fields is in the Paradox Basin in the Four Corners area. Most of these fields are located in the Aneth Extension in Utah, but there are a few wells in Colorado, New Mexico and Arizona. The first well was drilled in the Aneth Extension in 1956. In 2006 the Paradox Basin fields were injected with water and carbon dioxide to increase declining production. There are also wells in the Checkerboard area in New Mexico that are on leased land owned by individual Navajo.

The selling of leases and oil royalties have changed over the years. The Aneth Extension was created from Public Domain lands as part of a 1933 exchange with the federal government for lands flooded by Lake Powell. Congress appointed Utah as trustee on behalf of Navajos living in San Juan County, Utah for any potential revenues that came from natural resources in the area. Utah initially created a three-person committee to make leases, receive royalties and improve the living conditions for Utah Navajo. As the revenues and resulting expenditures increased, Utah created the twelve-member Navajo Commission to do the operational work. The Navajo Nation and Bureau of Indian Affairs are also involved.

Several Navajo organizations deal with oil and gas. The Utah Diné Corporation is a nonprofit organization established to take over from the Navajo Commission. The Navajo Nation Oil and Gas Company owns and operates oil and natural gas interests, primarily in New Mexico, Colorado, and Utah. Federally incorporated, it is wholly owned by the Navajo Nation.

==== Renewables ====
In early 2008, the Navajo Nation and Houston-based International Piping Products entered into an agreement to monitor wind resources, with the potential to build a 500-megawatt wind farm some fifty miles (80 km) north of Flagstaff, Arizona. Known as the Navajo Wind Project, it is proposed as the second commercial wind farm in Arizona after Iberdrola's Dry Lake Wind Power Project between Holbrook and Overgaard-Heber. The project is to be built on Aubrey Cliffs in Coconino County, Arizona.

In December 2010, the President and Navajo Council approved a proposal by the Navajo Tribal Utility Authority (NTUA), an enterprise of the Navajo Nation, and Edison Mission Energy to develop an 85-megawatt wind project at Big Boquillas Ranch, which is owned by the Navajo Nation and is located 80 miles west of Flagstaff. The NTUA plans to develop this into a 200-megawatt capacity at peak. This has been planned as the first majority-owned native project; NTUS was to own 51%. An estimated 300–350 people will construct the facility; it will have 10 permanent jobs. In August 2011, the Salt River Project, an Arizona utility, was announced as the first utility customer. Permitting and negotiations involve tribal, federal, state and local stakeholders. The project is intended not only as a shift to renewable energy but to increase access for tribal members; an estimated 16,000 homes are without access to electricity.

The wind project has foundered because of a "long feud between Cameron [Chapter] and Window Rock [central government] over which company to back". Both companies pulled out. Negotiations with Clipper Windpower looked promising, but that company was put up for sale after the recession.

=== Parks and attractions ===
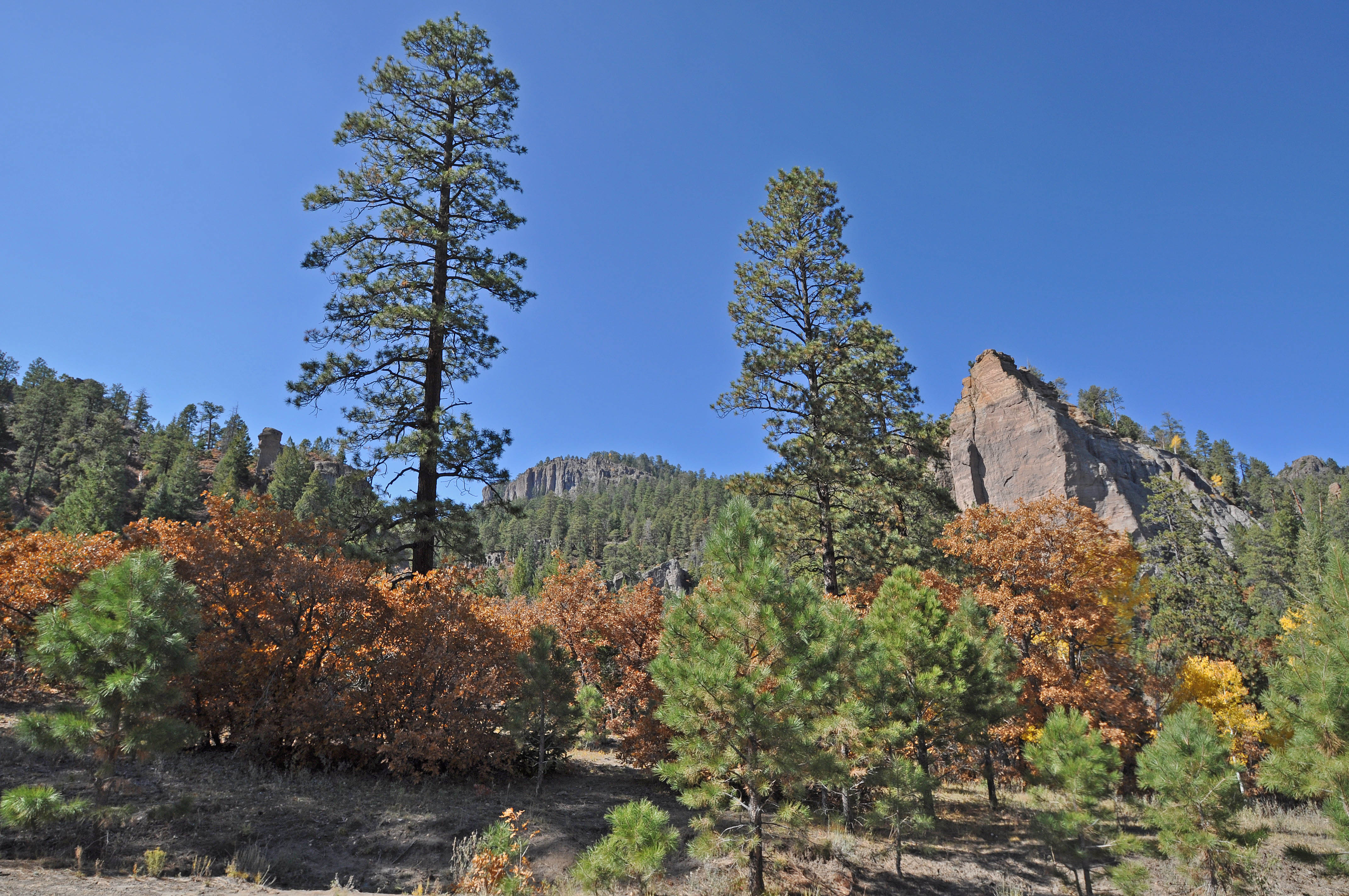
Narbona Pass Chuska Mountains

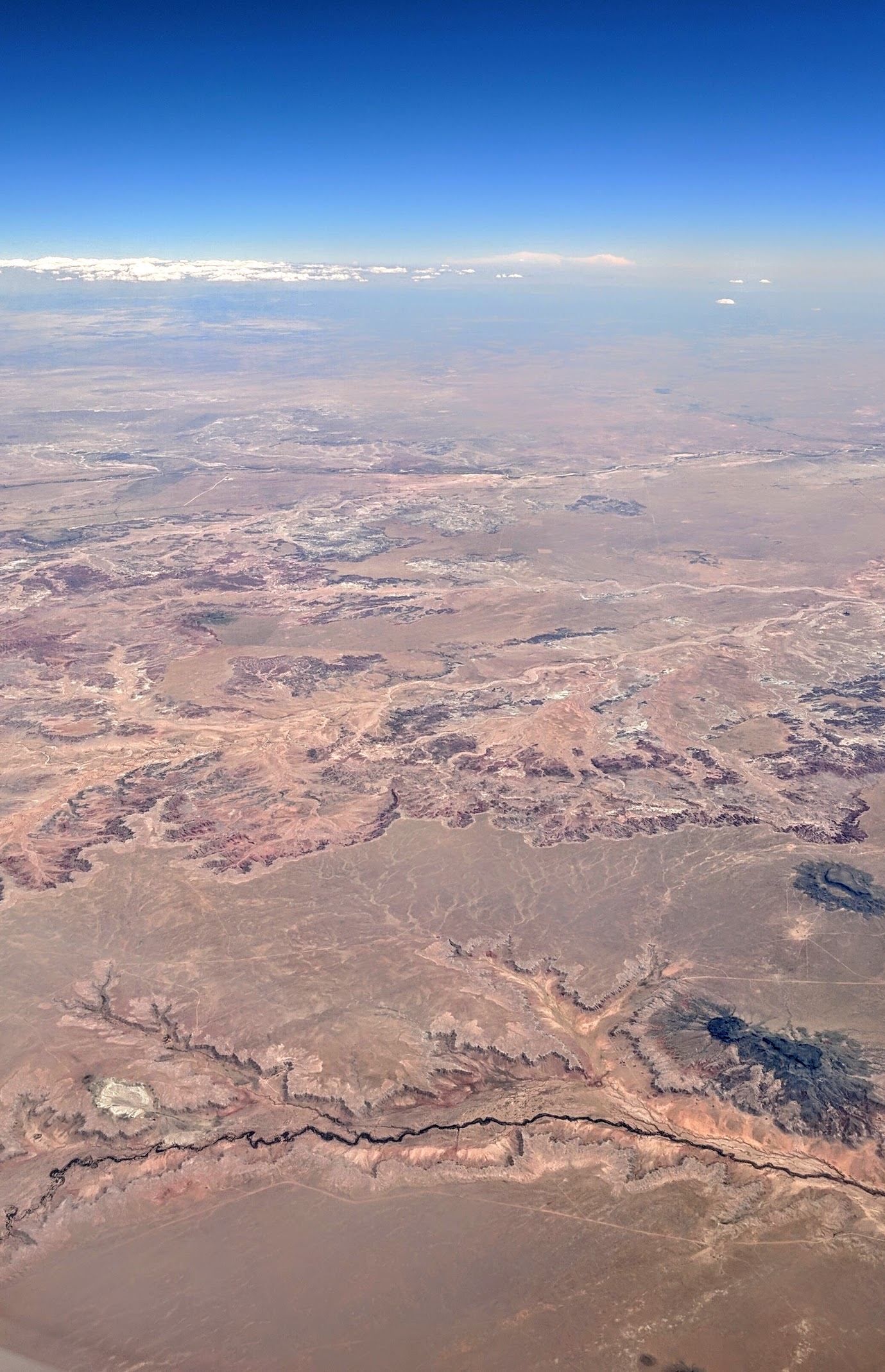
Aerial view looking south across Arizona's Painted Desert with part of the Navajo Reservation in the foreground

Tourism is important to the Navajo Nation. Parks and attractions within traditional Navajo lands include:

- Shiprock Pinnacle (large volcanic remnants, elevation 7,178 ft (2,188 m), located in New Mexico near Shiprock)
- Navajo Mountain (mountain along Utah and Arizona border, elevation 10,318 ft (3,145 m))
- Chaco Canyon
- Bisti/De-Na-Zin Wilderness
- Canyon De Chelly National Monument
- Navajo National Monument
- Window Rock Tribal Park
- Navajo Nation Museum
- Navajo Nation Zoological and Botanical Park
- Navajo Bridge
- Kinlichee Ruins
- Hubbell Trading Post National Historic Site
- Grand Falls
- Narbona Pass
- Hovenweep National Monument Outside of but bordering the Navajo Nation.

==== Navajo Tribal Parks ====
The Navajo Nation has four Tribal Parks, which bring tourists and revenue to the Tribe.

- Monument Valley Navajo Tribal Park (on the Utah and Arizona border, near the town of Kayenta, Arizona)
- Little Colorado River Gorge Navajo Tribal Park
- Lake Powell Navajo Tribal Park – includes Antelope Canyon and hiking trail to Rainbow Bridge National Monument
- Four Corners Monument Navajo Tribal Park

Navajo Nation Parks & Recreation also operates Tseyi Heritage Cottonwood Campground at Canyon de Chelly, Camp Asaayi at Bowl Canyon, and the Navajo Veterans Memorial Park.

=== Art and crafts ===
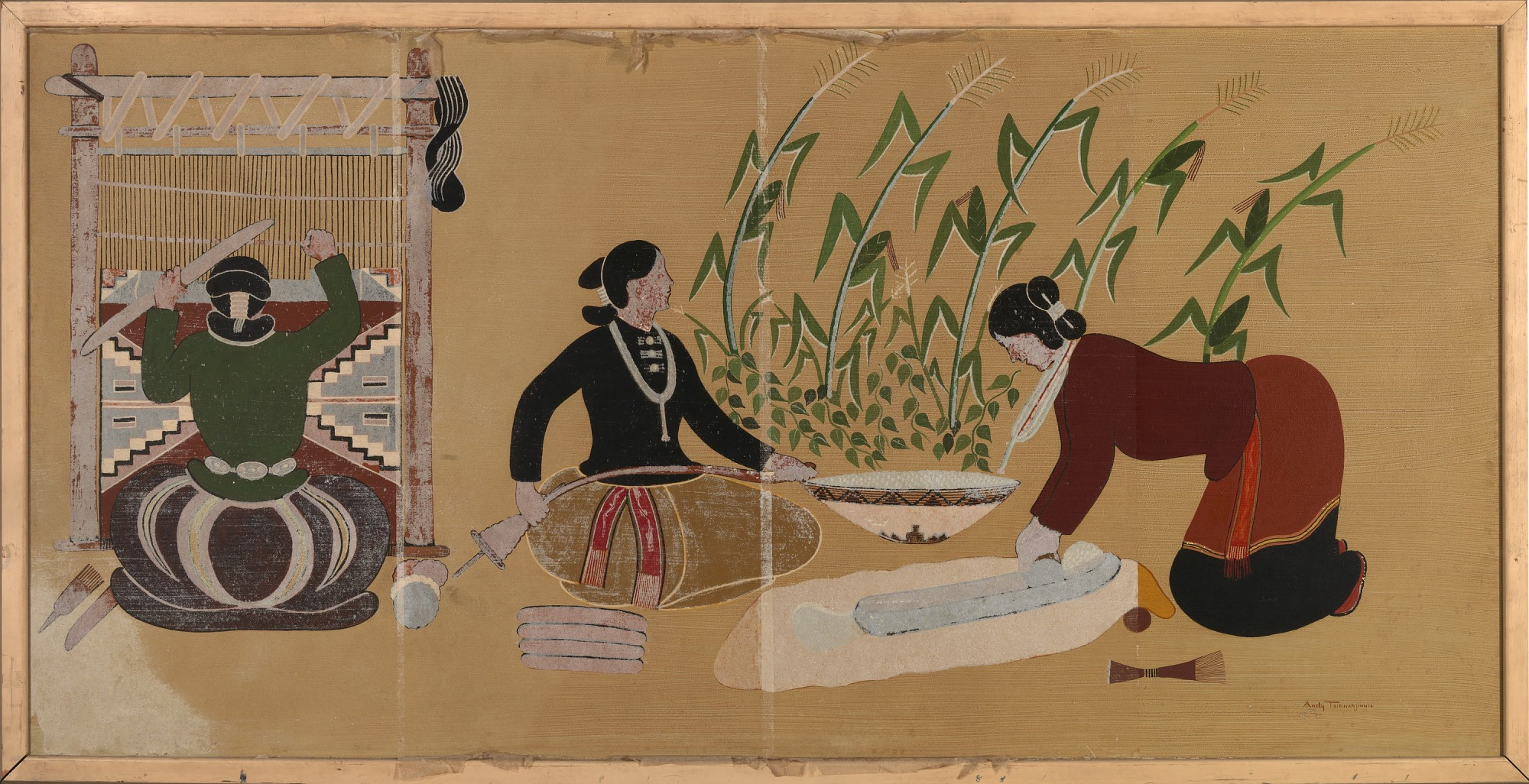
Navajo Women by Andy Tsihnahjinnie. Oil on fiberboard, 1934

An important small business group on the Navajo Nation is handmade arts and crafts industry. A survey conducted by the Arizona Hospitality Research & Resource Center reported that the Navajo nation made $20,428,039 from the art and crafts trade in 2011.

Since the introduction of sheep into the New World, Navajos have traditionally made use of either the vertical loom or the back strap loom (belt loom) to weave yarns. The early weaving practice was such that unprocessed wool was chiefly used to make blankets and which still retained its lanolin and suint (sweat), and which could repel water on the one hand, but which left an unpleasant odor to the finished woolen product on the other. Today, modern techniques have replaced the old, and wool is preprocessed and treated with an alkali substance. By 1900, the weaving of traditional Navajo blankets had been replaced by rug-making.

=== Diné Development Corp. ===
The Diné Development Corporation was formed in 2004 to promote Navajo business and seek viable business development to make use of casino revenues.

== Media ==
=== Newspaper ===
The Navajo Nation is served by various print media operations. The Navajo Times used to be published as the Navajo Times Today. Created by the Navajo Nation Council in 1959, it has been privatized. It continues to be the newspaper of record for the Navajo Nation. The Navajo Times is the largest Native American-owned newspaper company in the United States. Other newsprint groups also serve the Navajo Nation, including the Navajo/Hopi Observer, serving Navajo, Hopi and the towns of Winslow and Flagstaff.

=== KTNN ===
Established as a Navajo Nation Enterprise in 1985, KTNN is a commercial radio station that provides information and entertainment, and is located on AM 660.

== See also ==
- Navajo Nation Bar Association
