= List of high schools in Utah =

This is a list of all high schools or their equivalent in the state of Utah.

== Beaver County ==
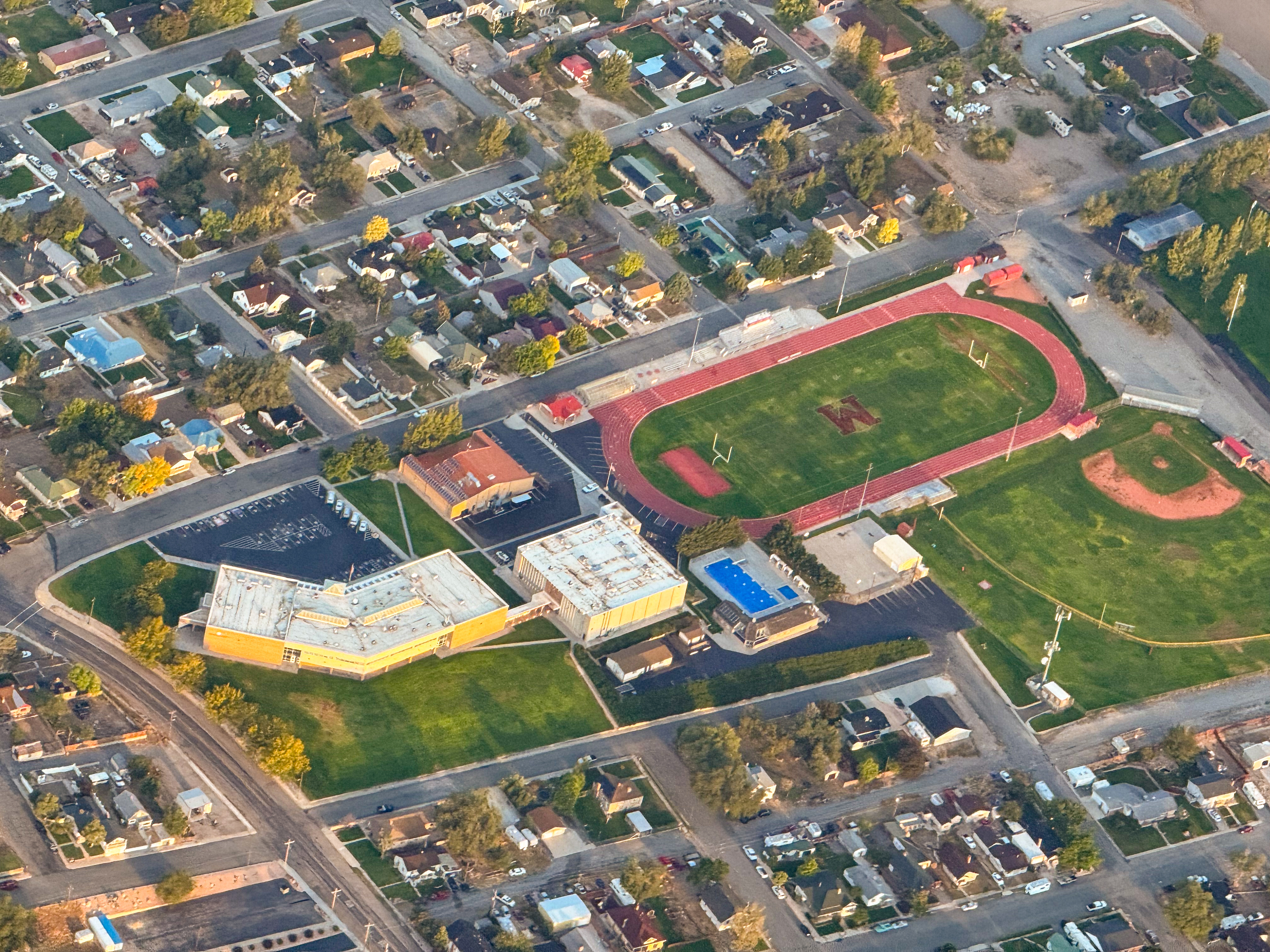
Milford High School

- Beaver County School District
  - Beaver High School – Beaver
  - Milford High School – Milford

== Box Elder County ==
- Box Elder School District
  - Bear River High School – Garland
  - Box Elder High School – Brigham City
  - Sunrise High School – Brigham City

== Cache County ==
- Cache County School District
  - Cache High School – Logan
  - Mountain Crest High School – Hyrum
  - Sky View High School – Smithfield
  - Green Canyon High School – North Logan, Utah
  - Ridgeline High School – Millville, Utah
- Logan City School District
  - Logan High School – Logan
  - Logan High School South Campus – Logan
- State charter and private
  - Fast Forward Charter High School – Logan
  - InTech Collegiate High School – North Logan

== Carbon County ==
- Carbon School District
  - Carbon High School – Price
  - Lighthouse Alternative – Price
- State charter and private
  - Pinnacle High School – Price

== Daggett County ==
- Manila High School – Manila

== Davis County ==
- Davis School District
  - Bountiful High School – Bountiful
  - Canyon Heights School – Kaysville
  - Clearfield High School – Clearfield
  - Davis High School – Kaysville
  - Farmington High School – Farmington
  - Layton High School – Layton
  - Legacy Preparatory Academy – Woods Cross
  - Mountain High School – Kaysville
  - Northridge High School – Layton
  - Syracuse High School – Syracuse
  - Viewmont High School – Bountiful
  - Woods Cross High School – Woods Cross
- State charter and private
  - Island View School – Syracuse

== Duchesne County ==
- Duchesne County School District
  - Altamont High School – Altamont
  - Duchesne High School – Duchesne
  - Tabiona School – Tabiona
  - Union High School – Roosevelt

== Emery County ==
- Emery County School District
  - Emery High School – Castle Dale
  - Green River High School – Green River

== Garfield County ==
- Garfield County School District
  - Bryce Valley High School – Tropic
  - Escalante High School – Escalante
  - Panguitch High School – Panguitch

== Grand County ==
- DayStar Adventist Academy – Castle Valley
- Grand County High School – Moab

== Iron County ==
- Iron County School District
  - Canyon View High School – Cedar City
  - Cedar High School – Cedar City
  - Foothill High School – Cedar City
  - Parowan High School – Parowan
- State charter and private
  - SUCCESS Academy at Southern Utah University – Cedar City
  - Havenwood Academy – Cedar City

== Juab County ==
- Juab School District
  - Juab High School – Nephi
- Tintic School District
  - Tintic High School – Eureka
  - West Desert High School – Trout Creek

== Kane County ==
- Kane County School District
  - Kanab High School – Kanab
  - Valley High School – Orderville

== Millard County ==
- Millard County School District
  - CBA Center – Delta – charter school within school district
  - Delta High School – Delta
  - EskDale High School – Eskdale
  - Millard High School – Fillmore

== Morgan County ==
- Morgan High School – Morgan

== Piute County ==
- Piute School District
  - Piute High School – Junction

== Rich County ==
- Rich High School – Randolph

== Salt Lake County ==
- Canyons School District
  - Alta High School – Sandy
  - Brighton High School – Cottonwood Heights
  - Hillcrest High School – Midvale
  - Jordan High School – Sandy
  - Corner Canyon High School – Draper
- Granite School District
  - Cottonwood High School – Murray
  - Cyprus High School – Magna
  - Granger High School – West Valley City
  - Granite Peaks High School – South Salt Lake
  - Hunter High School – West Valley City
  - Kearns High School – Kearns
  - Olympus High School – Holladay
  - Skyline High School – Millcreek Township
  - Taylorsville High School – Taylorsville
- Jordan School District
  - Bingham High School – South Jordan
  - Copper Hills High School – West Jordan
  - Herriman High School – Herriman
  - Mountain Ridge High School – Herriman
  - Riverton High School – Riverton
  - Valley High School – South Jordan
  - West Jordan High School – West Jordan
- Murray City School District
  - Murray High School – Murray
- Salt Lake City School District
  - East High School – Salt Lake City
  - Highland High School – Salt Lake City
  - Horizonte High School – Salt Lake City
  - Innovations Early College High School – Salt Lake City
  - West High School – Salt Lake City
- State charter and private
  - Academy for Math, Engineering, and Science (AMES) – Murray – charter school attached to Cottonwood High School
  - American Heritage – South Jordan
  - American Preparatory Academy (APA) – West Valley City, Utah
  - Beehive Academy of Science and Technology – Sandy
  - City Academy – Salt Lake City
  - East Hollywood High School – West Valley City
  - Intermountain Christian School – Holladay
  - Itineris Early College High School – West Jordan
  - Juan Diego Catholic High School – Draper
  - Judge Memorial Catholic High School – Salt Lake City
  - Leadership Academy of Utah (LAU)(grades 6-12)
  - Paradigm High School – South Jordan
  - Providence Hall High School- Herriman
  - Realms Of Inquiry – Salt Lake City
  - Rowland Hall-St. Mark's School – Salt Lake City
  - Salt Lake Center for Science Education (SLCSE) – Salt Lake City – charter school
  - Salt Lake School of the Performing Arts – Salt Lake City – charter school attached to Highland High School
  - Summit Academy High School – Bluffdale
  - Vista Private School (part of Vista Treatment Centers) – West Jordan
  - Waterford School – Sandy
  - Woodland Hills School – Murray

== San Juan County ==
- San Juan School District
  - Monticello High School – Monticello
  - Monument Valley High School – Monument Valley
  - Navajo Mountain High School – Navajo Mountain
  - San Juan High School – Blanding
  - Whitehorse High School – Montezuma Creek

== Sanpete County ==
- North Sanpete School District
  - North Sanpete High School – Mount Pleasant
- South Sanpete School District
  - Gunnison Valley High School – Gunnison
  - Manti High School – Manti
  - Sanpete Academy – Ephraim
- State charter and private
  - Wasatch Academy – Mount Pleasant

== Sevier County ==
- Sevier School District
  - Cedar Ridge High School – Richfield
  - North Sevier High School – Salina
  - Richfield High School – Richfield
  - South Sevier High School – Monroe

== Summit County ==
- North Summit School District
  - North Summit High School – Coalville
- Park City School District
  - Park City High School – Park City
  - Park City Learning Center – Park City
- South Summit School District
  - South Summit High School – Kamas
- The Winter Sports School in Park City

== Tooele County ==
- Tooele County School District
  - Blue Peak High School – Tooele
  - Dugway High School – Dugway
  - Grantsville High School – Grantsville
  - Stansbury High School – Stansbury Park
  - Tooele High School – Tooele
  - Wendover High School – Wendover
  - Deseret Peak High School - Tooele

== Uintah County ==
- Uintah School District
  - Uintah High School – Vernal
- Ute Tribe Education Department
  - Uintah River High School – Fort Duchesne

== Utah County ==
- Alpine School District
  - American Fork High School – American Fork
  - Cedar Valley High School – Eagle Mountain
  - East Shore High School – Orem
  - Lehi High School – Lehi
  - Lone Peak High School – Highland
  - Mountain View High School – Orem
  - Orem High School – Orem
  - Pleasant Grove High School – Pleasant Grove
  - Skyridge High School – Lehi
  - Timpanogos High School – Orem
  - Westlake High School – Saratoga Springs
- Nebo School District
  - Landmark High School – Spanish Fork
  - Maple Mountain High School – Spanish Fork
  - Payson High School – Payson
  - Salem Hills High School – Salem
  - Spanish Fork High School – Spanish Fork
  - Springville High School – Springville
- Provo City School District
  - The Center for High School Studies – Provo
  - Independence High School – Provo
  - Provo High School – Provo
  - Slate Canyon School – Provo
  - Timpview High School – Provo
- State charter and private
  - American Heritage School – American Fork
  - American Leadership Academy – Spanish Fork
  - Heritage School – Provo
  - Discovery Academy – Provo
  - Liahona Academy – Pleasant Grove
  - Liberty Academy – Salem
  - Lumen Scholar Institute – Orem
  - Merit Academy – Springville
  - New Haven School – Provo
  - Park City Independent, Orem
  - Rockwell Charter High School – Eagle Mountain
  - Karl G. Maeser Preparatory Academy – Lindon
  - Utah County Academy of Sciences (UCAS) – Orem – charter school at Utah Valley University, in cooperation with the Alpine, Nebo, and Provo School Districts
  - Walden School of Liberal Arts – Provo

== Wasatch County ==
- Wasatch County School District
  - Wasatch High School – Heber City
  - Wasatch Alternative High School – Heber City

== Washington County ==
- Washington County School District
  - Career Tech High School – St. George
  - Crimson Cliffs High School – St. George
  - Desert Hills High School – St. George
  - Dixie High School – St. George
  - Enterprise High School – Enterprise
  - Hurricane High School – Hurricane
  - Millcreek High School – St. George
  - Pine View High School – St. George
  - Snow Canyon High School – St. George
- State charter and private
  - SUCCESS Academy at Dixie State College – St. George
  - Tuacahn High School for the Performing Arts – Ivins
- Diamond Ranch Academy

== Wayne County ==
- Wayne High School – Bicknell

== Weber County ==
- Ogden City School District
  - Ben Lomond High School – Ogden
  - Millcreek High School – Ogden
  - Ogden High School – Ogden
  - Washington High School – Ogden
- Weber County School District
  - Bonneville High School – Ogden
  - Canyon High School – Ogden
  - Fremont High School – Plain City
  - Roy High School – Roy
  - Two Rivers High School – Ogden
  - Weber Innovations High School – Ogden
  - Weber High School (grades 9–12), – Ogden
- State charter and private
  - DaVinci Academy of Science and the Arts (grades 9–12), Ogden
  - NUAMES Early College High School
  - St. Joseph Catholic High School – Ogden
  - Venture High School (grades 9–12) – Marriott-Slaterville
  - Leadership Academy of Utah (LAU) (grades 6-12)

== Defunct schools ==
- East Carbon High School (closed) – East Carbon
- Notre Dame Catholic High School (closed)
- Creekside High School – Murray (closed)
- South High School – Salt Lake City – (closed 1988)
- Brigham Young High School – Provo – (closed 1968)

== See also ==
- List of school districts in Utah
