= SUCCESS Academy =

Charter school in Utah

Location
- 351 University Blvd. Cedar City, Utah 84720; United States; 37°40′29″N 113°4′20″W

Information
- Type: Charter
- Motto: Diligence in the Pursuit of Excellence
- Established: 2005
- Founder: Iron County School District, Southern Utah University, Bill and Melinda Gates Foundation
- School district: Iron and Washington County School District
- Director: Ben Kaufman
- Principal: Gavin Hawkley (SUU SUCCESS), Brian Reed (UT SUCCESS)
- Faculty: 36 between two campuses
- Grades: SUU (9-12) UT (10-12)
- Enrollment: SUU (200) UT (300) (2021-2022)
- Colors: Blue and white
- Website: SUCCESS Academy Website

SUCCESS Academy (Southern Utah Center for Computer, Engineering and Science Students) is an early college high school based in Cedar City, Utah, United States. SUCCESS Academy has two campuses, one located at Southern Utah University (SUU) in the Iron County School District, one at Utah Tech University in the Washington County School District.

== History ==
The Southern Utah Center for Computer, Engineering and Science Students, commonly known as SUCCESS Academy, was founded in 2005. SUCCESS Academy is a charter school sponsored by the Iron County School District. SUCCESS Academy was selected by the Utah Partnership to participate in an Early College High School grant. The grant money was provided by the Bill and Melinda Gates Foundation.

SUCCESS Academy currently has two school locations. The first is located in Cedar City, Utah on the Southern Utah University campus. The second is in St. George on the Utah Tech University campus.

SUU SUCCESS Academy first opened their doors in August 2005. They were originally located in the SUU Science Building. They are currently located in the Multipurpose Building on SUU campus. SUU SUCCESS started with 9th and 10th grade students but is currently open to 9th-12th graders.

== Founding ==
The Utah Partnership was created under the direction of Governor Michael Leavitt. It was charged with the task to identify and create Early College High Schools. These were often referenced as High-Tech Highs. The founders of SUCCESS Academy are the Iron County School District, Southern Utah University and funding from the Bill and Melinda Gates Foundation.

== Awards ==
SUCCESS Academy has been nationally recognized for several awards. Recent awards include being chosen by Newsweek as the top high school in America for Beating the Odds for college readiness, and for its students rising above financial obstacles and challenges. Another award is for SAGE test results. For the state of Utah, SUCCESS received the top Math scores in the state. In Language Arts, they received fourth place in the state. In 2019, SUCCESS Academy was named #2 Best School District in Utah, #2 Safest School District in Utah, and #4 for Utah School Districts with the Best Teachers by Niche. SUCCESS Academy had also been given #2 Best School District in Utah by Niche in 2018. Several SUCCESS academy students have been named Sterling Scholars at their boundary schools and received the Daniels Scholarship.

== Graduation information ==
The first class that graduated from SUU SUCCESS was in 2008, and from DSU SUCCESS in 2009.

The graduation rates for SUCCESS Academy students are:

	DSU		SUU	
2012	High school diploma	97.5%	High school diploma	100%
	Associate degree	95%	Associate degree	82.05%
2013	High school diploma	100%	High school diploma	98%
	Associate degree	93.02%	Associate degree	94%
2014	High school diploma	98.25%	High school diploma	98%
	Associate degree	77.19%	Associate degree	95.35%
2015	High school diploma	94.12%	High school diploma	97.5%
	Associate degree	89.36%	Associate degree	94.87%

== Iron County Campus ==
Classes taught at SUU Campus (37°40′29″N 113°4′20″W):

9th	10th	11th	12th
Math 1	Math 2	Math 3	English 2010
Math 2	Math 3	Math 1050	Engineering 2010
Physics	English	Art 1010	Psychology 1010
Science Research	Bio 1010/1015	History 1700	Math 1050
English	Bio 1020/1025	Chem 1010/1015	CSIS 1000
	Humanities 1010	English 1010	Math 1210
		Math 1060	Math 1210
		Math 1040	
		LM 1010	

Clubs:

- Science Club
- Computer Science Club (officially titled SUCCESS Academy Computer Technology Club)
- Photobook Club
- Math Club
- Creative Writing Club
- National Honor Society
- Chess Club
- Health Occupations Students of America

SUU SUCCESS Academy also features a Student Government.

== Washington County Campus ==
Classes taught at Utah Tech Campus (37°5′43″N 113°34′40″W):

10th	10th CIT Cohort	11th	11th CIT Cohort	12th
Biology 1010	App Development	Communications 2110	CS 1410	Individual Studies
Chemistry 1010/1015	Communication 2110	English 2010	CS 2420	POLS 1100
English 1010	CS 1400	History 1700	DES 2500	
Honors Chemistry	CS Principles	Humanities 1010	History 1510	
Honors English 10	Design 1300	Math 1040	IT 1100	
Library Science 1010	Exploring Computer Science	Math 1060	IT 1200	
Science Research	Math TBD	Physics 1010/1015	IT 2400	
Secondary Math II Honors	Political Science 1100	Art 1010	Math 1050	
Math 1010 or Math 1050	Web Design 1400	Science Research	Math 1060	
	Web Development 1	Individual Studies (with special permission)	Nutrition and Food Science 1020	

Clubs:

- Astronomy Club
- Book Club
- Computer Club
- Honor Society
- Science Club

== See also ==
- Education in Utah
- Itineris Early College High School
- List of school districts in Utah
- Utah Schools for the Deaf and the Blind
