= List of school districts in Utah =

The following is a list of public school districts within the State of Utah in the United States. In addition to the schools governed by these districts, the state has approximately 100 charter schools that operate independently of school districts, but still receive public funds. There are also approximately 120 private and parochial schools that operate within state.

== Districts ==
According to state law, all school districts are separate from county and municipal governments. There are no public school systems in Utah dependent on other layers of government.

All data is from the 2016-17 school year and is slightly outdated.

Superintendents are up to date as of 3/10/2017

Educator Statistics 2016 (based on FTE licensed classroom teachers PK-12)

Name	Number of students	Number of elementary schools	Number of middle/junior high schools	Number of high schools	Number of special purpose schools	Number of licensed classroom teachers	Superintendent
Alpine School District	78,659	59	13	10	15	2,960	Samuel Y. Jarman
Beaver County School District	1,563	3	1	2	2	67	Ray Terry
Box Elder School District	11,341	15	6	3	5	447	Ronald D. Tolman
Cache County School District	16,976	16	6	2	6	642	Steven C. Norton
Canyons School District	33,899	30	8	5	6	1,377	James Briscoe
Carbon School District	3,500	5	2	1	3	151	Steven E. Carlsen
Daggett School District	181	2	0	1	2	17	E. Bruce Northcott
Davis School District	69,879	60	16	8	7	2,575	Dan Linford
Duchesne County School District	5,076	8	1	4	2	224	David Brotherson
Emery County School District	2,220	6	2	2	1	116	Larry W. Davis
Garfield County School District	922	5	1	3	1	52	Tracy Davis
Grand County School District	1,451	1	1	1	2	79	Scott L. Crane
Granite School District	67,822	63	16	8	7	2,696	Rich K. Nye
Iron County School District	8,933	9	2	3	4	388	Lance Hatch
Jordan School District	52,324	34	10	5	9	2,016	Anthony Godfrey
Juab School District	2,412	3	1	1	1	92	Rick Robins
Kane County School District	1,209	4	1	4	2	66	Ben Dalton
Logan City School District	5,957	6	1	1	3	245	Frank Schofield
Millard County School District	2,803	5	2	3	0	138	David V. Styler
Morgan County School District	2,836	2	2	1	2	109	Douglas D. Jacobs
Murray City School District	6,502	7	2	1	4	258	Jennifer Covington
Nebo School District	31,895	27	8	5	4	1,235	Rick Nielsen
North Sanpete School District	2,377	5	1	1	3	111	Samuel Ray
North Summit School District	1,034	1	1	1	3	48	Jerre Holmes
Ogden City School District	12,128	14	3	2	6	510	Sandy Coroles
Park City School District	4,763	4	2	1	6	246	Ember Conley
Piute County School District	291	2	0	1	3	24	Shane Erickson
Provo City School District	16,983	13	2	2	6	601	Keith Rittel
Rich School District	492	2	1	1	3	30	Dale Lambom
Salt Lake City School District	23,600	28	5	4	6	1,034	Elizabeth Grant
San Juan School District	2,975	6	1	5	1	161	Edward Lyman
Sevier School District	4,520	5	3	3	6	199	Cade J. Douglas
South Sanpete School District	3,157	3	2	2	3	158	Kent Larsen
South Summit School District	1,537	2	1	2	2	72	Shad Sorenson
Tintic School District	258	2	0	2	1	17	Kodey Hughes
Tooele County School District	13,988	16	3	6	3	596	Scott A. Rogers
Uintah School District	7,287	7	2	1	4	301	Mark Dockins
Wasatch County School District	6,286	5	1	1	2	256	Paul Sweat
Washington County School District	28,167	24	10	6	7	1,181	Larry Bergeson
Wayne County School District	469	2	1	1	1	33	John Fahey
Weber School District	31,184	28	9	5	10	1,266	Gina Butters
Charter Schools	67,509	49	22	28	6	2,912	
Total	633,896	587	170	123	172	25,705	

== See also ==
- List of high schools in Utah
- Utah Schools for the Deaf and the Blind
