= Spanish Fork High School Gymnasium =

- U.S. National Register of Historic Places
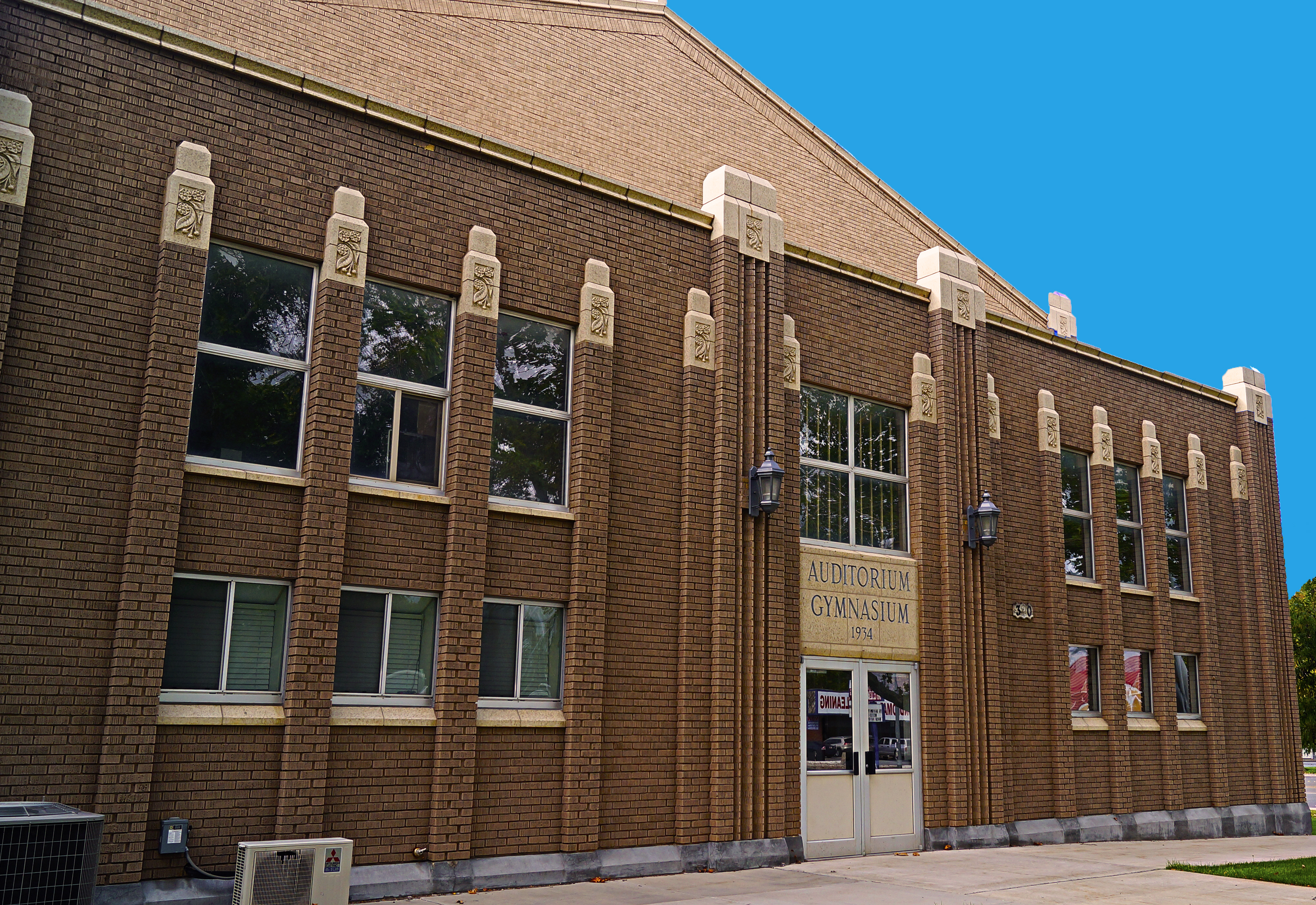
- The former auditorium/gymnasium, September 2017, is now used by the Nebo School District as part of its main office

- Location within Utah Location within the United States
- Location: 300 South Main Street; Spanish Fork, Utah; United States
- Coordinates: 40°6′20″N 111°39′16″W
- Area: less than one acre
- Built: 1935
- Architectural style: Art Deco
- MPS: Public Works Buildings TR
- NRHP reference No.: 85000819
- Added to NRHP: April 1, 1985

The Spanish Fork High School Gymnasium at 320 South Main Street (SR-198) in Spanish Fork, Utah, United States is an Art Deco style building built in 1935 by the Public Works Administration. It was listed on the National Register of Historic Places in 1985. It is not part of the current Spanish Fork High School campus, which is a number of blocks to the northwest of the original gymnasium. Instead it is used by the Nebo School District as part of its main offices.

== See also ==
- National Register of Historic Places listings in Utah County, Utah
