= Craig Patterson =

American football player (born 1964)

No. 76
- Position: Defensive end

Personal information
- Born: July 18, 1964 (age 62); Santa Cruz, California, U.S.
- Listed height: 6 ft 4 in (1.93 m)
- Listed weight: 314 lb (142 kg)

Career information
- High school: Emery County (Huntington, Utah)
- College: BYU
- NFL draft: 1990: undrafted

Career history
- Cincinnati Bengals (1990)*; Phoenix Cardinals (1990–1991)
- * Offseason or practice squad member only

Career NFL statistics
- Fumble recoveries: 1
- Interceptions: 1
- Stats at Pro Football Reference

Craig Patterson (born July 18, 1964) is an American former professional football player who was a defensive end for the Phoenix Cardinals of the National Football League (NFL) in 1991. He played college football for the BYU Cougars.
