= UCAS (disambiguation) =

UCAS may be the acronym of the Universities & Colleges Admissions Service, a clearing house for applications to degree programmes at British universities and colleges.

UCAS may also refer to:

- University of the Chinese Academy of Sciences, a public research university in Beijing, China
- University College of Applied Sciences, a public university in Gaza, Palestine
- Unified Canadian Aboriginal Syllabics, formal name of a script
  - Unified Canadian Aboriginal syllabics (Unicode block), encoded script
- Unmanned Combat Air System(s)
  - Joint Unmanned Combat Air Systems (J-UCAS)
  - Unmanned Combat Air System Demonstrator program (UCAS-D)
- Utah County Academy of Sciences, a small charter high school in Orem, Utah, United States
- The United Canadian and American States, a country in the fictional Shadowrun universe.
