= Intermountain Christian School =

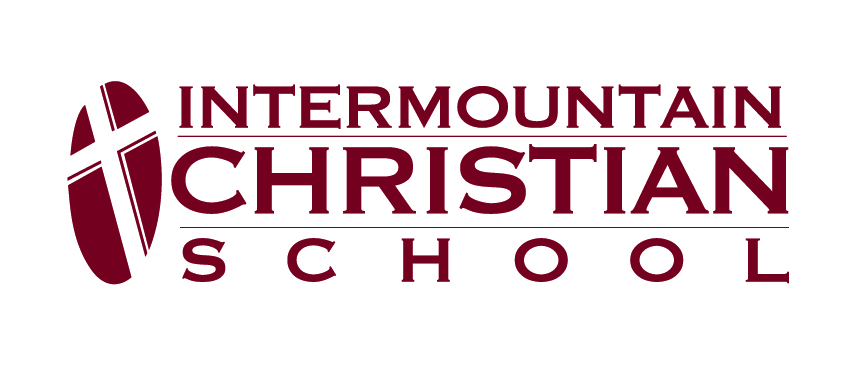

- Intermountain Christian School in 2026

Location
- 6515 Lion Lane; Holladay, Utah 84121; United States; 40°37′54″N 111°48′14″W

Information
- Former name: Evangelical Free Church School
- Type: Christian private, elementary, middle, high school
- Motto: Intermountain Christian School is a Christ-centered learning community that exists to equip and inspire students to thrive in God’s world.
- Religious affiliation: Non-denominational Christian
- Established: 1982
- Status: Open
- NCES School ID: A9300993
- Head of school: Matt Parker
- Staff: 55
- Teaching staff: 26
- Grades: PreK-12
- Gender: Co-ed
- Enrollment: 290 (2023-24)
- Average class size: 20
- Hours in school day: 6.9
- Colors: Maroon, white
- Mascot: Lion
- Accreditation: Association of Christian Schools International (ACSI), CSI (Christian Schools International) and COGNIA
- Website: www.intermountainchristian.org

Intermountain Christian School (ICS) is a private non-denominational Christian school in Holladay, Utah, United States, that was founded in 1982.

== Facilities and curriculum ==
The school building features computer labs, a school library, a dual-purpose cafeteria and fellowship hall, and a gymnasium used for athletics, basketball, and volleyball, as well as church activities.

ICS has an athletics program, with several sports for boys and girls. Middle and high school girls play basketball, volleyball and soccer. High school boys play baseball, basketball, soccer, and golf. Middle school boys play soccer and basketball.

At the elementary level, the school offers music, physical education, library, and computer classes, along with core classes. There is also a school band in which fifth grade students can join.

== See also ==
- List of high schools in Utah
