= Utah County Academy of Sciences =

Location
- 940 West 800 South, Orem, Utah and 2121 N 550 W, Provo, Utah; United States; 40.2827°N 111.7178°W

Information
- Type: Public Charter
- Established: August 2005
- School district: Alpine, Nebo, and Provo
- Authorizer: Utah State Charter School Board
- Principal: Jennilyn Derbidge
- Teaching staff: 22.04 (FTE)
- Grades: 9-12
- Enrollment: 549 (2023-2024)
- Student to teacher ratio: 24.91
- Colors: Green and Yellow
- Mascot: Prairie Falcon
- Website: www.ucas-edu.net

Utah County Academy of Sciences (UCAS) /ˈjuːˈkæs/ is a small charter high school in association with Utah Valley University (UVU) in Orem, Utah, United States. UCAS students travel from school districts in the surrounding Utah County area, including Nebo School District, Alpine School District, and Provo School District.
