= Provo High School =

Location
- 1199 North Lakeshore Drive; Provo, Utah; 40.249959°N 111.715599°W

Information
- Type: Public High School
- School district: Provo School District
- Principal: Kami Alvarez
- Teaching staff: 79.19 (FTE)
- Grades: 9-12
- Enrollment: 2,023 (2024-2025)
- Student to teacher ratio: 25.55
- Colors: Green, white, and black
- Mascot: Bulldog
- Website: provohigh.provo.edu

Provo High School is a public secondary school located in Provo, Utah, United States. It is one of three high schools in the Provo City School District and was the oldest secondary school in the city. In the Summer of 2017 the school district began building a new school and construction was finished in August 2018.

== History ==
Provo High School was founded in 1912. It did not graduate its first students until 1921. The students originally met at Provo Center School before a specific high school building was built in 1920. The current Provo High School was built in 2018.

== Move ==
In December 2015, the Provo City School District voted to sell the 25-acre property where Provo High School was and move to a location in the western side of the city, rather than rebuild on the current site. It was later revealed that nearby Brigham Young University was purchasing the land for $25 million. The new high school site is located on a 42-acre plot at 1199 N. Lakeshore Drive. The layout includes three stories, three classroom wings, and three gymnasiums. It opened to the public in August 2018.

== Academics ==
=== Distance Learning/Concurrent Enrollment ===
Provo High School offers 23 distance learning classes through the Utah Valley University (UVU) Live Interactive program.

With the concurrent enrollment program, Provo High School students are able to take a class and receive college credit from Utah Valley University. There are 37 classes available, and, depending on the course, students are required to have a 2.0+ GPA or a 3.0+ as a prerequisite. Students can earn from three to 30 credit hours.

=== AP ===
In 2016, 41% of students who took AP exams passed with a score of 3 or more, with a total number of 523 tests taken. In 2015, 51% of students passed AP exams.

=== PUP ===
Provo High used to offer a "gifted talent magnet" program for 7th and 8th graders called Provo Unlimited Progress. PUP allowed academically gifted students to attend classes at the high school all day. PUP students are kept in classes together for core subjects except in special cases where students require more rigorous coursework. To get in, 6th graders at any of the nearby middle schools participate in a special testing session (usually in November or December) and parents must submit an online application for the student. They ended this program in the 2017-2018 year.

== Notable alumni ==
- Paul D. Boyer, chemist
- Kirk Chambers, former professional football player
- Barney Clark, first person to live with an artificial heart
- Mason Cobb, college football player
- Kyle Collinsworth, professional basketball player
- Sean Covey, business executive and author
- Annie D. Danielewski, aka Poe, singer/songwriter
- Mark Z. Danielewski, author
- Brandon Davies, professional basketball player
- Devin Durrant, former professional basketball player, religious leader
- Tracy Hickman, novelist
- Matthew S. Holland, academic administrator, religious leader
- Michelle Kaufusi, 45th mayor of Provo
- Vance Law, college baseball coach
- John Lewis (Arizona politician), politician
- Gifford Nielsen, former professional football player, religious leader
- Dallin H. Oaks, religious leader
- Ryan Smith, businessman
- Brett Vroman, former professional basketball player
- Mekeli Wesley, former professional basketball player
- Tai Wesley, former professional basketball player
- Kyle Whittingham, college football coach

== See also ==
- List of high schools in Utah
