= InTech Collegiate Academy =

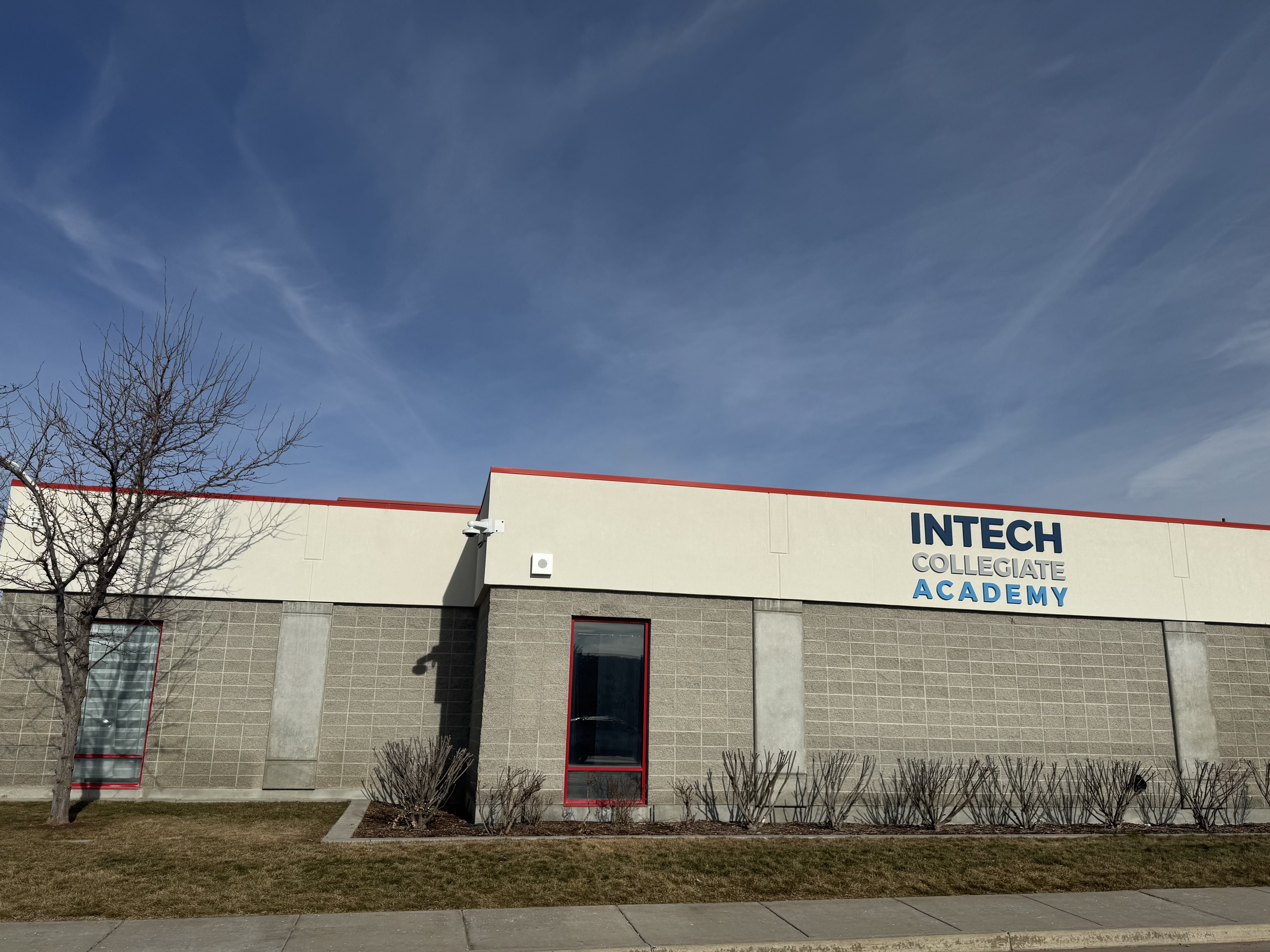

Location
- 1301 North 600 West, Suite 110; Logan, Utah 84341; United States
- 41°45′20″N 111°51′02″W

Information
- Former name: InTech Collegiate High School (2006-2020)
- Type: Public; Charter; Early College High School
- Established: 2006; 20 years ago
- Founder: Steve Zsiray
- School board: Board Website
- CEEB code: 450288
- NCES School ID: 490003901129
- Principal: Jason Stanger
- Teaching staff: 10.75 (FTE)
- Grades: 7-12
- Enrollment: 199 (2023-2024)
- Student to teacher ratio: 18.51
- Colors: Navy; White; Sky blue
- Mascot: Moose
- Accreditation: Cognia
- USNWR ranking: 2nd in Utah (U.S. News & World Report, 2021)
- National ranking: 383 (U.S. News & World Report, 2021)
- Affiliation: Utah State University
- Website: intechacademy.org

InTech Collegiate Academy (often known simply as InTech) is a STEM-focused, early college high school partnered with Utah State University and located in Logan, Utah, United States on the main campus of Bridgerland Technical College. InTech serves students in 7th through 12th grades.

== Statistics ==
- Grade levels (2006-2007): 9–10
- Grade levels (2007-2008): 9–11
- Grade levels (2008-2020): 9–12
- Grade levels (From 2020): 7-12

== Awards and recognition ==
The Utah Board of Education gave the school an "A" grade in 2017. The U.S. News & World Report listed ICA as the top high school in Utah four times from 2012 to 2019. ICA was listed as 273 in national rankings in 2019.

== See also ==
- List of high schools in Utah
