= Valley High School (Orderville, Utah) =

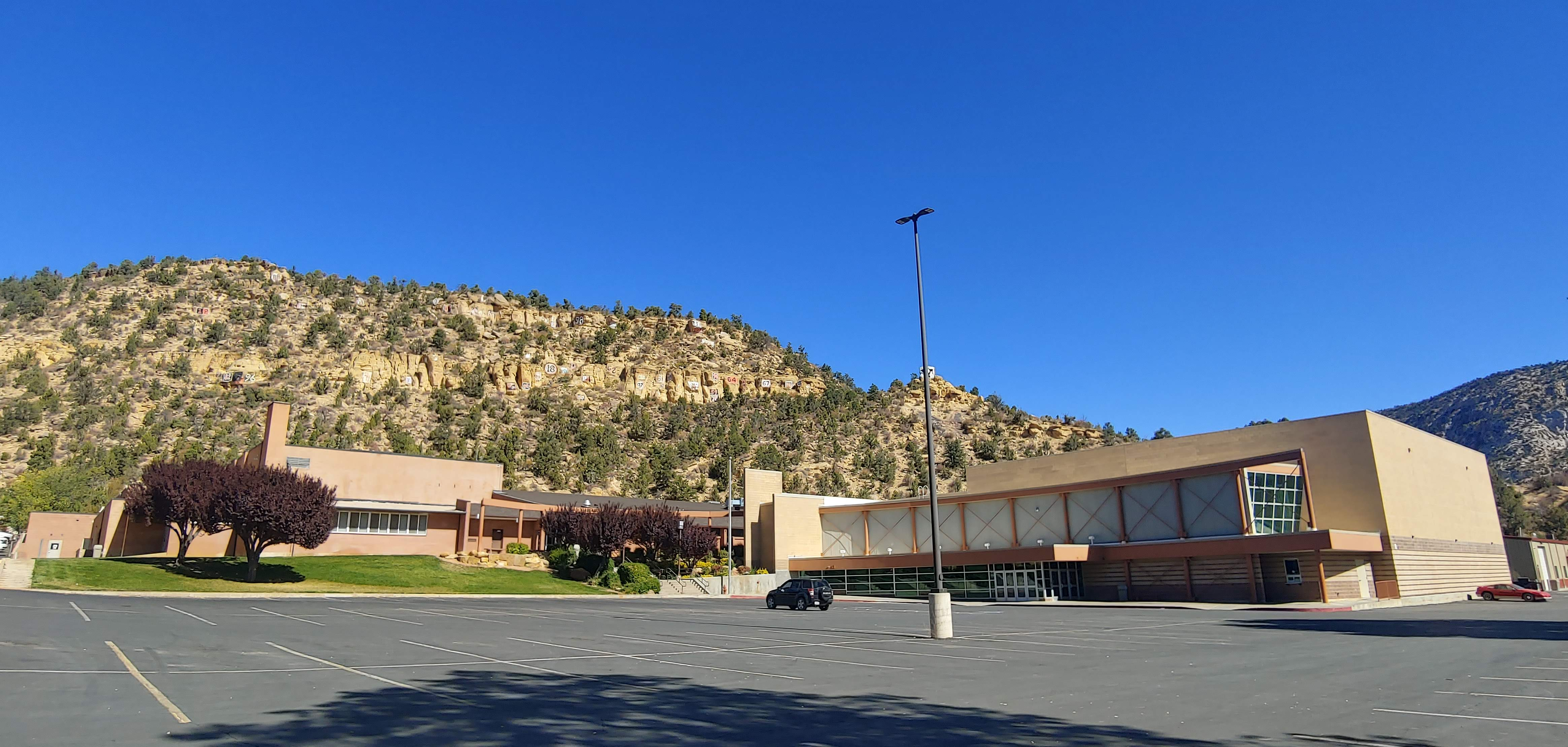

Location
- 150 N Center Street, Orderville, Utah; 1A Region 20
- Coordinates: 37.2784°N 112.6380°W

Information
- Type: Public high school
- Motto: "Education today, success tomorrow"
- School district: Kane County School District
- Principal: Jim Wood
- Teaching staff: 11.19 (FTE)
- Grades: 7-12
- Enrollment: 154 (2023–2024)
- Student to teacher ratio: 13.76
- Colors: Black and orange
- Team name: Buffaloes
- Website: http://www.vhs.kane.k12.ut.us/

Valley High School is a public high school located in Orderville, Utah. It sits in Class 1A of the Utah High School Activities Association. The school mascot is the Buffalo and the school colors are black and orange.

== History ==
Valley High School was founded in 1927. The Kane County School District designated that every school in the district would be red and white. The origin of the school colors and mascot are not known. The original school was torn down in 1982 and the new building that stands today was finished in 1983.

== Extracurricular activities ==
=== Athletics ===
The Valley Buffalos are the official varsity and JV teams for Valley High School. The baseball team has won three state championships: 2002, 2014, 2017. The basketball team has won three state championships: 1981, 1993, and 1995. The boys' golf team has won state four times in a row, that being in 2015,2016,2017,2018. The girls' basketball team have won 7 state championships, while the volleyball team has won two state titles.
