= Providence Hall Charter School =

Providence Hall

Location
- 4795 W Patriot Ridge Drive, Herriman, Utah; Herriman, Utah; United States; 40.5038188°N 112.0122554°W

Information
- Type: Public charter
- Established: 2008
- Authorizer: Utah State Charter School Board
- Director: Nathan Marshall
- Teaching staff: 146
- Grades: K-12
- Enrollment: 2072
- Mascot: The Patriots
- Publication: Patriot Podcast: The Hall Way! (Podcast)
- Website: www.providencehall.com

Providence Hall is a K-12 charter school located in Herriman, Utah.

Providence Hall was originally planned to be location in neighboring city Bluffdale, but relocated to Herriman in late 2007.

It is entirely certified to be an International Baccalaureate school, with all programs from Primary Years Program (PYP), Middle Years Program (MYP), and Diploma Program (DP). Students are admitted through a lottery.

== Elementary School ==
Providence Hall Elementary School teaches grades K-5. They have an emphasis on "inquiry-based, authentic, and hands-on learning". The framework for the curriculum is an Elementary Primary Years Programme. The principal is Michael Fry. An expansion started in the summer of 2022 to add classroom space and a full-sized gym. This expansion included a building that will sit directly behind the elementary school. It added 2 kindergarten classes, and 3 additional grade levels, 1st, 2nd, and 3rd. It entailed building 11 new classrooms, 1 weight room, a boardroom, an IT office, 3 school level offices, a PE storage and office, a full regulation size gym with 6 basketball hoops and 3 volleyball net systems, a faculty lounge, and storage. The expansion brought the existing student count from around 800 to around 900 total students. Additionally, the project included a playing field surrounding the building, new parking area for the school, as well as a pull around lane for pickup and drop off that will wrap around the rear of the building.

== Junior High ==
The junior high teaches grades 6th through 8th. They operate on an A/B schedule. The principal is Chris Winfree. Band, orchestra, and choir are also offered.

Sports offered:

- Cross Country (Co-Ed)
- Girls Volleyball
- Boys Basketball
- Girls Basketball
- Boys Soccer
- Girls Soccer

== High School ==
the school has multiple clubs and organizations including National Honors Society, Naval JROTC, speech and debate, dance, cheer, and choir. The principal is Melissa McPhail.

Sports offered:

- Football
- Golf
- Volleyball
- Cross country
- Tennis
- Soccer
- Basketball
- Wrestling
- Softball

The football program was added in 2019 and a football stadium was built. There are plans to build a performing arts center in the future. Home games are currently played at Zions Bank Stadium.

On October 28, 2024, the high school flooded via the main waterline breaking. The gym, stage, main and west hallways, elevator, and multiple classrooms flooded. Because of this, the students had to do online school until November 18.
