= Cedar High School =

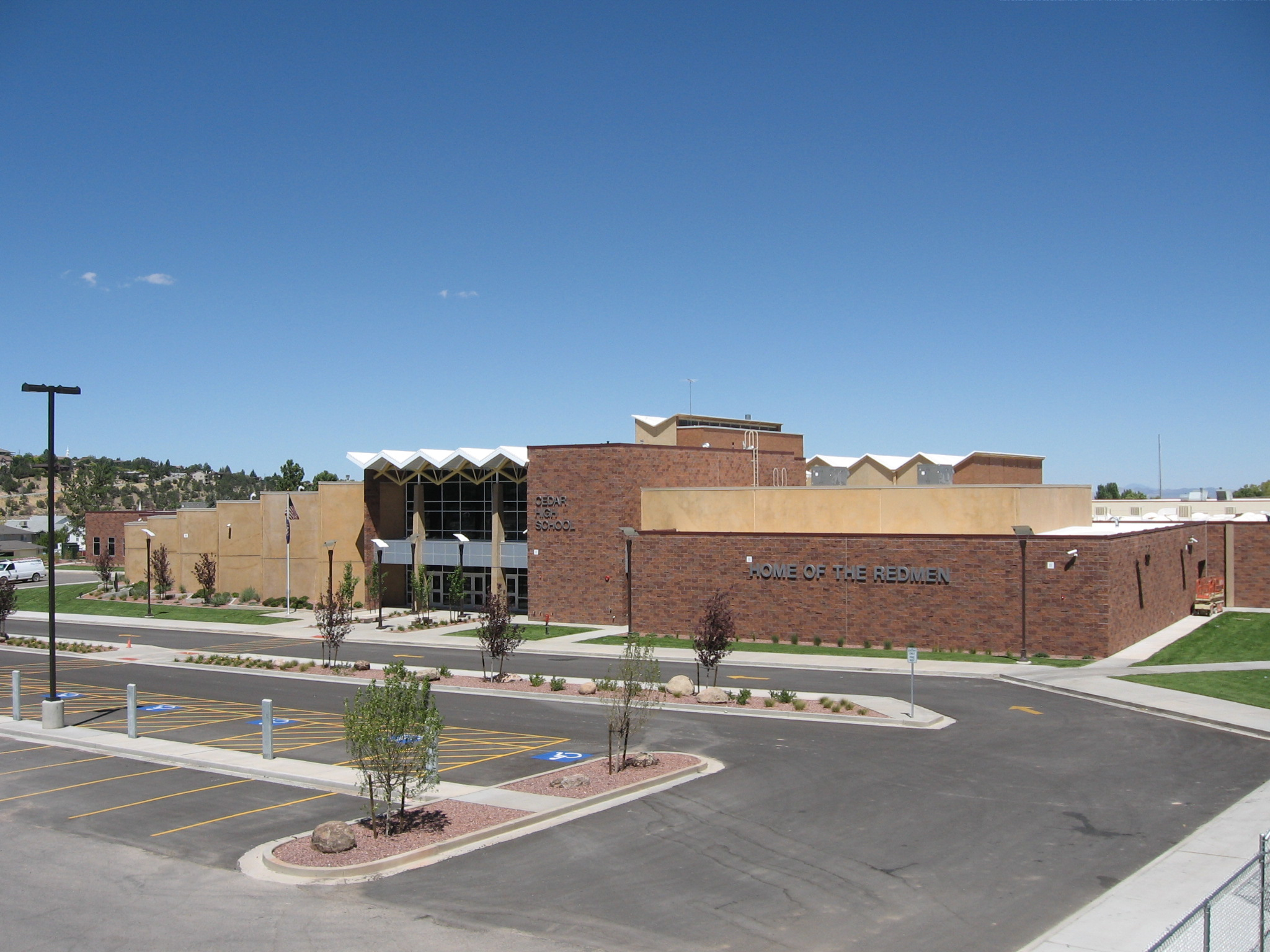

Location
- 703 W 600 S Cedar City, Utah 84720; United States; 37°39′56″N 113°04′22″W

Information
- Other names: Cedar City High School or CHS
- Type: Public high school
- School district: Iron County School District
- NCES School ID: 490039000278
- Principal: Terri Sanders
- Grades: 9-12
- Enrollment: 1,341 (2023-2024)
- Colors: Crimson, Gold and White
- Nickname: Reds
- Website: chs.ironk12.org

Cedar High School, also known as Cedar City High School or CHS, is a public high school in Cedar City, Utah, United States.

== History ==
Cedar High School was founded in September 1940. The school building was located on Center Street and 300 West. It was designed to house 350 students and became overcrowded as the student body grew to 500. (Cedar High School was never part of Branch Agricultural College, which was across the street from the original High School location.)

The school was founded in 1940 and incorporated high school students from Cedar City and the surrounding area. In 1942 CHS got its mascot under President Jay Thorley. Cedar High School belongs to the Iron County School District. The current building was completed for the 1963–1964 academic year. The building has had expansions over the years. The most recent was completed in 2010, and includes a commons area, band room, and a counselling center. Current enrollment is approximately 1100.

== Sports ==
CHS is a 4A school in region 9 in all sport's programs with the exception of football which moved down to 3A in 2025.They are the only Region 9 team that is not located in Washington County Utah

CHS sports include baseball, basketball, cheerleading, cross country, football, golf, Mohey Tawa (drill team), soccer, softball, swimming, tennis, track, volleyball, water polo and wrestling.

The boys' basketball team won their first 2A State championship in 1975. They won the 3A Utah State Basketball Championship in 1994 and 1995. The boys' baseball team won the 3A Utah State Championship in 1975.

== Notable alumni ==
- Gordon Church – American man who was murdered for being gay
- Ally Condie – author of the New York Times bestseller Matched
- Michael O. Leavitt – Governor of Utah and Secretary of Health and Human Services
- John Ursua – professional football player for the Seattle Seahawks

== Mascot controversy ==
In early 2019, the Iron County School Board was asked to reconsider the school's mascot "The Redmen." The board formed an advisory committee to investigate the change. After the committee voted 17–2 to change the mascot, the school board voted 3–2 in favor of retiring the mascot. Cedar High School students later selected "Reds" as a replacement.
