= Canyon View High School (Cedar City, Utah) =

High school in Utah, United States

Coordinates: 37°42′50″N 113°03′47″W

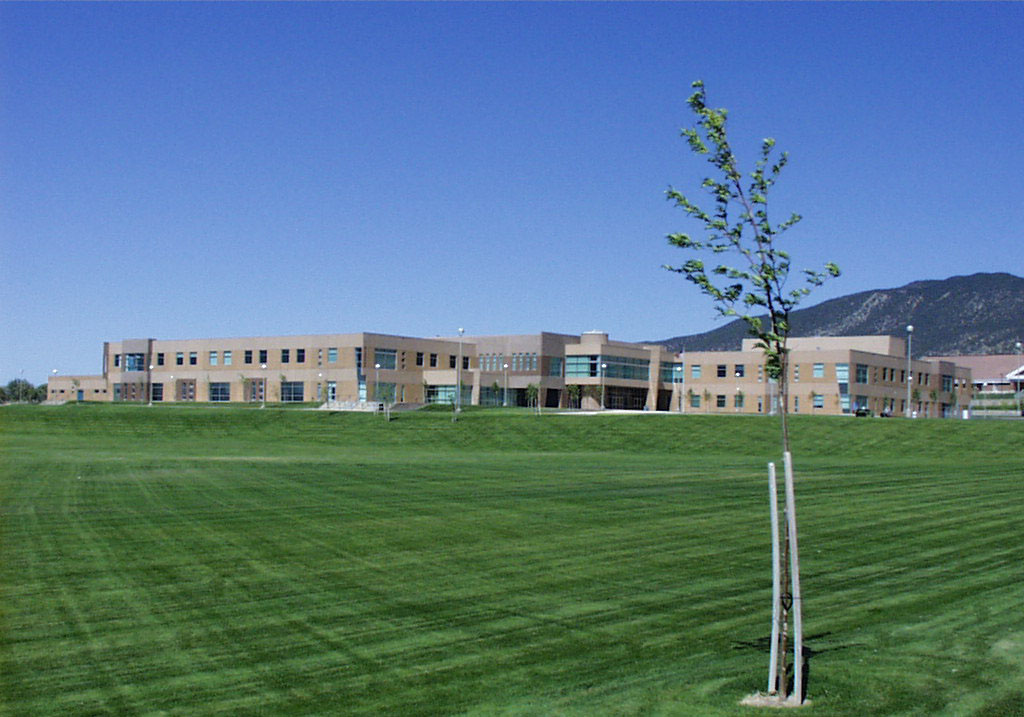
- Cedar City, Utah, United States

Information
- Established: 1997
- Teaching staff: 59.19 (FTE)
- Enrollment: 1,021 (2024–2025)
- Student to teacher ratio: 17.25
- Colors: black, silver, and teal
- Mascot: Falcon
- Website: http://cvhs.ironk12.org/

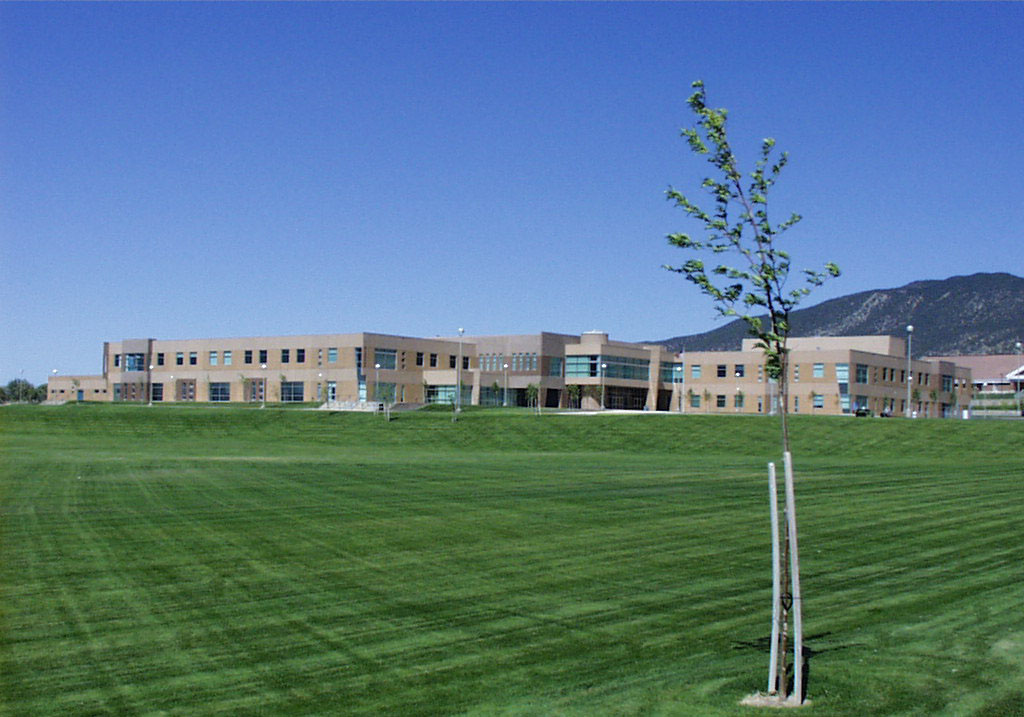
Canyon View High School

Canyon View High School (also known as CV and CVHS) was established in 1997 in Cedar City, Utah. Its mascot is the Falcon. The school colors are black, silver, and teal. It has approximately 1,000 students and 50 faculty members. Its current principal is Dennis Heaton.

This school is in Iron County School District, Region 12, and is a 3A school.

== History ==
Not knowing the future growth of the school, in 1999 the Iron County School District released that they were building a new Canyon View High School building just across the street from the already newly built school. In the fall of 2000, students were finally able to enter the current building of Canyon View.

Athletics:

State winners:

Sport	Years
Boys Basketball: 1	1999
Girls Basketball: 2	2006, 2025
Drill Team: 5	2021, 2022, 2023, 2024, 2025
Softball: 1	2006
Boys Cross County: 2	2023, 2025
Boys Baseball: 1	2025
Girls Volleyball 1	2025
Marching Band: 1	2002, 2025
Girls Wrestling: 3	2024, 2025, 2026
Softball: 1	2006
Baseball: 1	2025

== Boundaries ==
Canyon View High School boundaries currently include the northern half of Cedar City, as well as Enoch, Newcastle, Beryl, and other parts of Iron County.

== Notable alumni ==
- Mitch Talbot - MLB pitcher
- Shayne Smith (comedian) - Stand-up comedian
