= Itineris Early College High School =

Location
- 8714 Roy Del Circle, West Jordan, Utah 84088; United States; 40.593232°N 111.974875°W

Information
- Type: Public charter
- Established: 2004
- Authorizer: Utah State Charter School Board
- Principal: Renée Edwards
- Teaching staff: 18.54 (FTE))
- Enrollment: 384 (2023-2024)
- Student to teacher ratio: 20.71
- Website: https://iechs.org

Itineris Early College High School is an independent public charter school that first opened in 2004. It was located in West Jordan, Utah, USA, on the campus of Salt Lake Community College. In 2014, The school was relocated to a new building nearby the Salt Lake Community College campus.
