= Cedar City, Utah =

City in the United States

- City
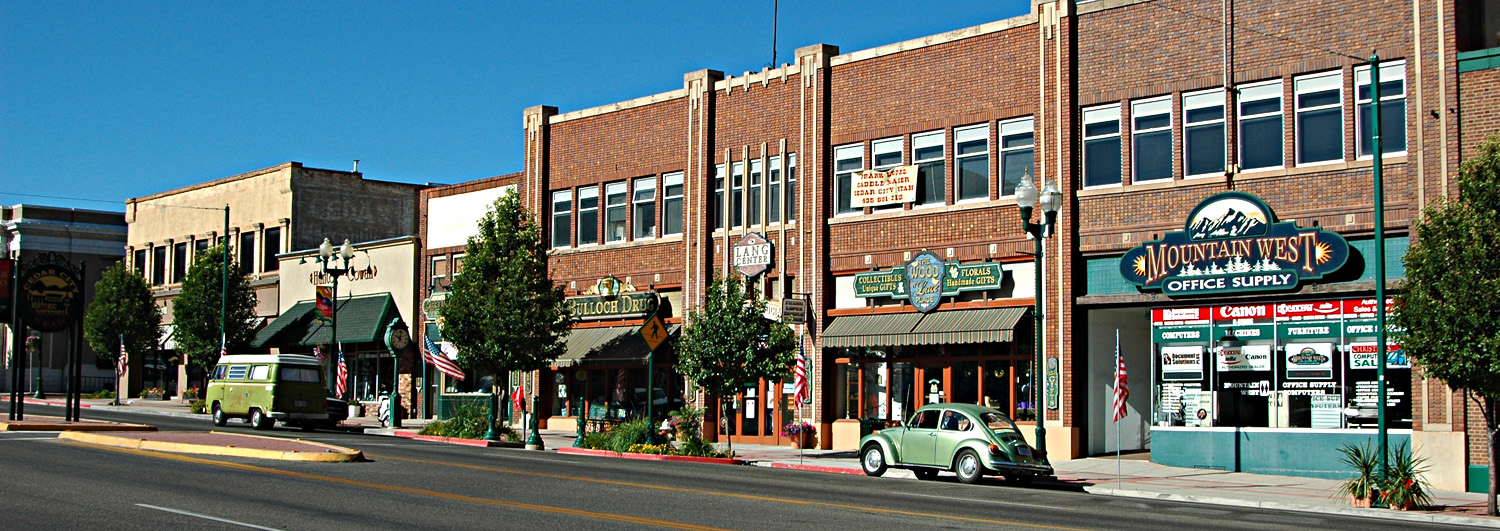
- Main Street in September 2005

- Flag Logo
- Nickname: Festival City USA
- Interactive map of Cedar City, Utah
- Location within Utah Location within the United States
- Coordinates: 37°40′39″N 113°05′43″W
- Country: United States
- State: Utah
- County: Iron
- Founded: November 11, 1851
- Incorporated: February 18, 1868
- Named for: Juniper ("cedar") trees

Area
  - Total: 35.95 sq mi (93.10 km^{2})
  - Land: 35.87 sq mi (92.89 km^{2})
  - Water: 0.081 sq mi (0.21 km^{2})
- Elevation: 5,670 ft (1,730 m)

Population (2020)
  - Total: 35,235
  - Density: 982.4/sq mi (379.32/km^{2})
- Time zone: UTC−7 (Mountain (MST))
  - Summer (DST): UTC−6 (MDT)
- ZIP codes: 84720-84721
- Area code: 435
- FIPS code: 49-11320
- GNIS feature ID: 2409415
- Website: www.cedarcityut.gov

Cedar City is the largest city in Iron County, Utah, United States. Located 250 miles (400 km) south of Salt Lake City, it is 170 miles (270 km) north of Las Vegas on Interstate 15. Southern Utah University is located in Cedar City. It is the home of the Utah Shakespeare Festival, the Utah Summer Games, and other events. As of the 2020 census the city had a population of 35,235, up from 28,857 in the 2010 census.

== History ==
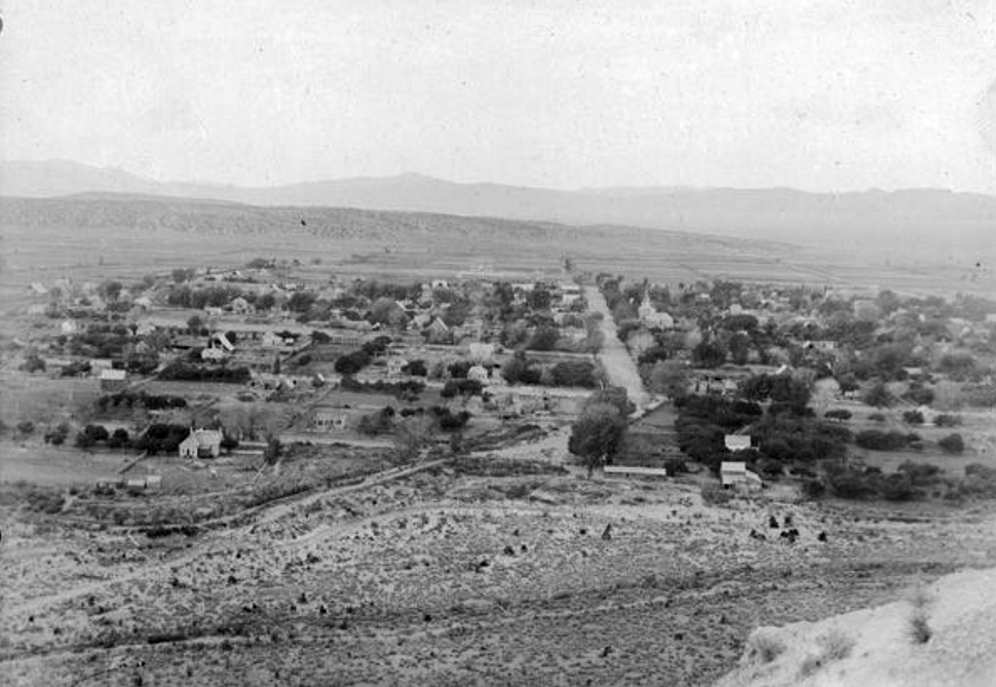
View of Cedar City, 1902

The presence of prehistoric people in the Cedar City area is revealed by rock art found in Parowan Gap to the north and Fremont sites dated to A.D. 1000 and 1300. Ancestors of the present-day Southern Paiute people met the Domínguez–Escalante expedition in this area in 1776. Fifty years later, in 1826, mountain man and fur trader Jedediah Smith traveled through the area, exploring a route from Utah to California.

Cedar City was originally settled in late 1851 by Mormon pioneers originating from Parowan, Utah, who were sent to build an iron works. The site, known as "Fort Cedar" or "Cedar City", was equidistant from vast iron deposits 10 miles (16 km) west and coal resources 10 miles (16 km) east up Cedar Canyon, but was named after the abundant local trees (which are not cedars but junipers). Two companies of men led by Henry Lunt reached the fort site in a blizzard on November 11, 1851, making that date the official founding. In 1855, a new site, closer to the iron works and out of the flood plain of Coal Creek, was established at the suggestion of Brigham Young. A furnace operated from September 1852 for three years, producing about 25 tons of pig iron, using iron ore deposits located in the Iron Mountain District.

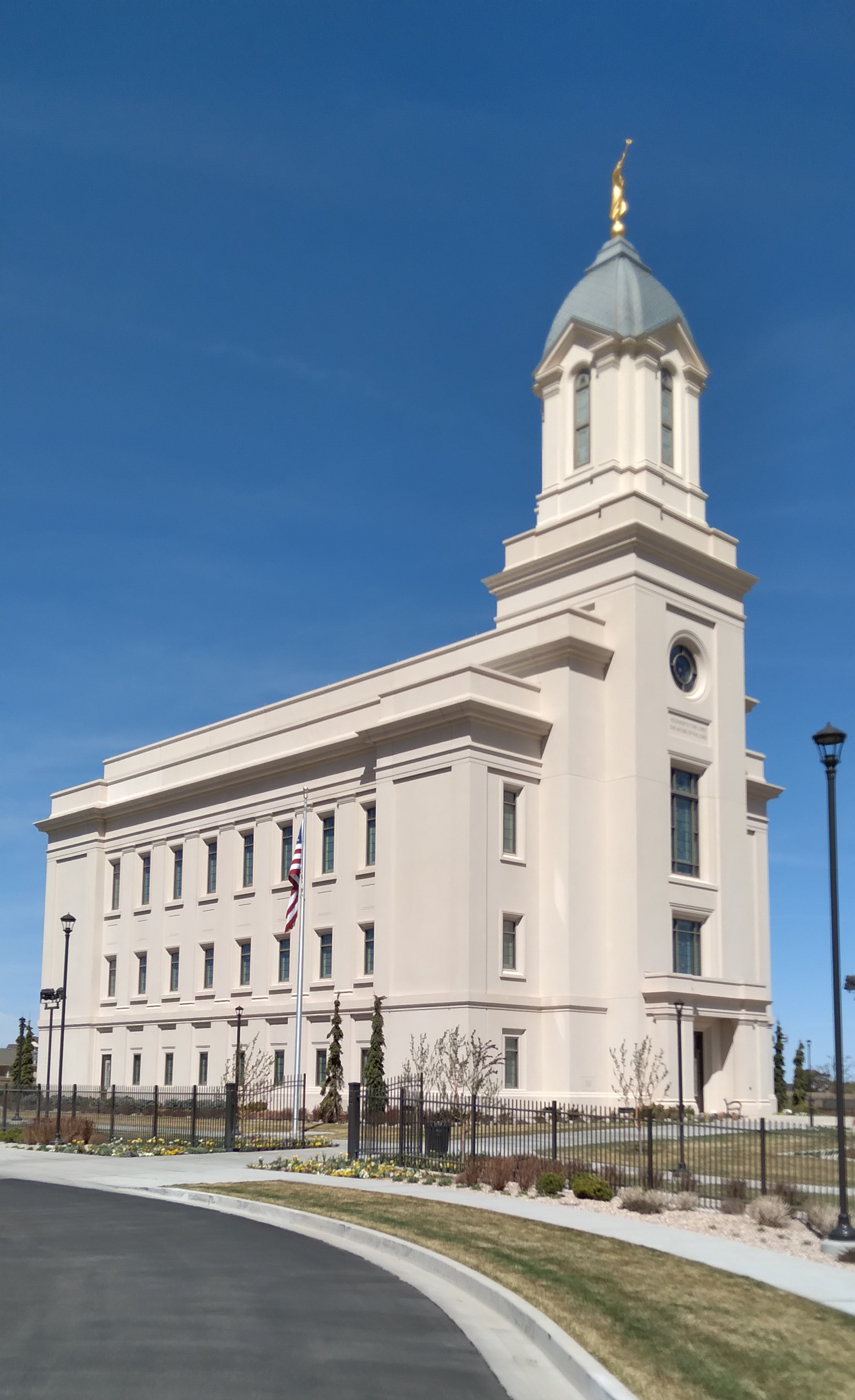
Cedar City Temple

Cedar City was incorporated on February 18, 1868.

The ironworks closed in 1858, though mining continued in the area until the 1980s. The completion of a railroad connection to Cedar City in 1923 established the area as a tourism gateway to nearby Bryce Canyon National Park, Zion National Park, Grand Canyon National Park, and Cedar Breaks National Monument. Cedar City continues to be a center of tourism, commercial development, education, and the arts in southwestern Utah.

The city has shared in the rapid growth of much of southwestern Utah since the late 1980s.

On December 10, 2017, the Church of Jesus Christ of Latter-day Saints dedicated its Cedar City Utah Temple.

== Geography ==
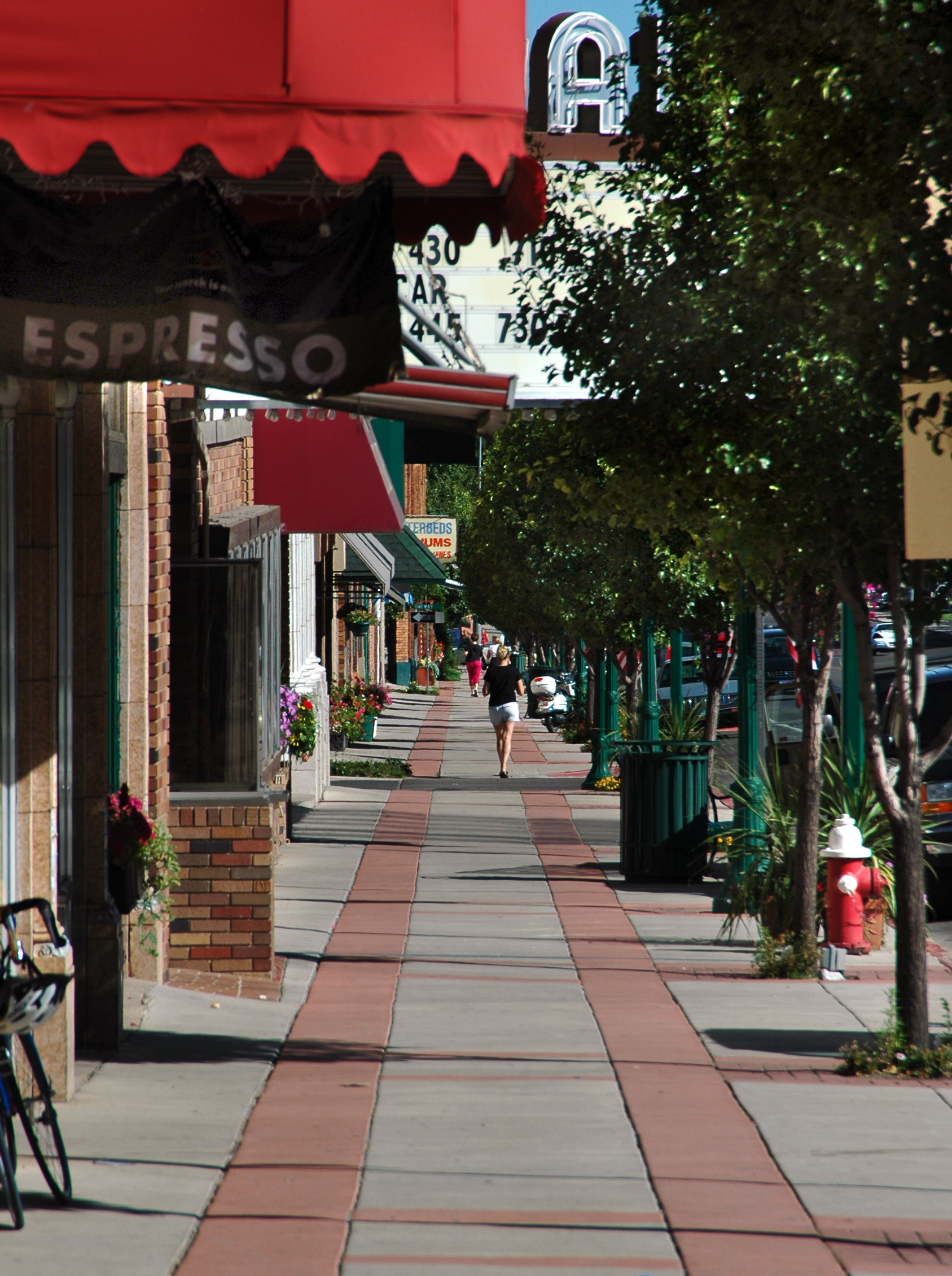
Historic Main Street

Cedar City is located in the southeast Great Basin and is approximately 20 miles (32 km) north of the northeastern edge of the Mojave Desert. Its elevation of 5,846 feet (1,782 m) gives it a somewhat cooler climate compared to the nearby St. George region, though it retains cultural ties to the city. For example, the two share a daily newspaper.

According to the United States Census Bureau, the city has a total area of 20.1 square miles (52 km^{2}), all land. In some of the older neighborhoods in the city, an irrigation system is utilized by many residents for their lawns and gardens, as "water is diverted from a natural stream (Coal Creek) into a series of canals and ditches for residential flood irrigation".

=== Climate ===
The city is located on the western edge of the Markagunt Plateau, in a high desert valley, Cedar Valley, with no ocean drainage. The climate is the typical semi-arid climate (BSk) of the Mountain West, though snowfall can be quite heavy, reaching a historical maximum of 36.9 inches (0.94 m) in January 1949.

Climate data for Cedar City, Utah, 1991–2020 normals, extremes 1948–present
Month	Jan	Feb	Mar	Apr	May	Jun	Jul	Aug	Sep	Oct	Nov	Dec	Year
Record high °F (°C)	70 (21)	73 (23)	86 (30)	86 (30)	96 (36)	102 (39)	105 (41)	101 (38)	99 (37)	89 (32)	76 (24)	68 (20)	105 (41)
Mean maximum °F (°C)	56.6 (13.7)	61.8 (16.6)	70.5 (21.4)	77.4 (25.2)	86.2 (30.1)	95.1 (35.1)	98.9 (37.2)	95.7 (35.4)	90.2 (32.3)	80.8 (27.1)	69.0 (20.6)	58.2 (14.6)	99.3 (37.4)
Mean daily maximum °F (°C)	42.8 (6.0)	47.4 (8.6)	56.2 (13.4)	62.6 (17.0)	73.1 (22.8)	84.7 (29.3)	91.0 (32.8)	88.5 (31.4)	80.6 (27.0)	67.1 (19.5)	53.4 (11.9)	42.1 (5.6)	65.8 (18.8)
Daily mean °F (°C)	30.4 (−0.9)	34.3 (1.3)	41.5 (5.3)	47.2 (8.4)	56.4 (13.6)	66.6 (19.2)	74.0 (23.3)	72.1 (22.3)	63.1 (17.3)	50.5 (10.3)	38.5 (3.6)	29.2 (−1.6)	50.3 (10.2)
Mean daily minimum °F (°C)	18.0 (−7.8)	21.3 (−5.9)	26.8 (−2.9)	31.9 (−0.1)	39.7 (4.3)	48.5 (9.2)	57.1 (13.9)	55.6 (13.1)	45.5 (7.5)	33.9 (1.1)	23.6 (−4.7)	16.3 (−8.7)	34.9 (1.6)
Mean minimum °F (°C)	−2.1 (−18.9)	3.6 (−15.8)	13.0 (−10.6)	19.4 (−7.0)	26.5 (−3.1)	35.3 (1.8)	47.5 (8.6)	46.2 (7.9)	32.0 (0.0)	19.7 (−6.8)	6.5 (−14.2)	−2.5 (−19.2)	−7.5 (−21.9)
Record low °F (°C)	−26 (−32)	−24 (−31)	−1 (−18)	6 (−14)	16 (−9)	27 (−3)	40 (4)	35 (2)	23 (−5)	−7 (−22)	−12 (−24)	−23 (−31)	−26 (−32)
Average precipitation inches (mm)	0.82 (21)	0.98 (25)	1.23 (31)	1.01 (26)	0.94 (24)	0.48 (12)	1.02 (26)	0.86 (22)	0.75 (19)	1.23 (31)	0.84 (21)	0.88 (22)	11.04 (280)
Average snowfall inches (cm)	8.7 (22)	9.0 (23)	8.6 (22)	4.9 (12)	0.9 (2.3)	0.2 (0.51)	0.0 (0.0)	0.0 (0.0)	0.1 (0.25)	2.1 (5.3)	6.7 (17)	6.6 (17)	47.8 (121.36)
Average precipitation days (≥ 0.01 in)	6.0	7.0	7.4	7.0	5.8	2.6	6.2	5.9	4.7	5.3	5.1	6.3	69.3
Average snowy days (≥ 0.1 in)	5.2	4.7	4.8	2.9	0.8	0.2	0.0	0.0	0.2	1.1	3.6	4.1	27.6
Source 1: NOAA (snow/snow days 1981–2010)
Source 2: National Weather Service

== Demographics ==
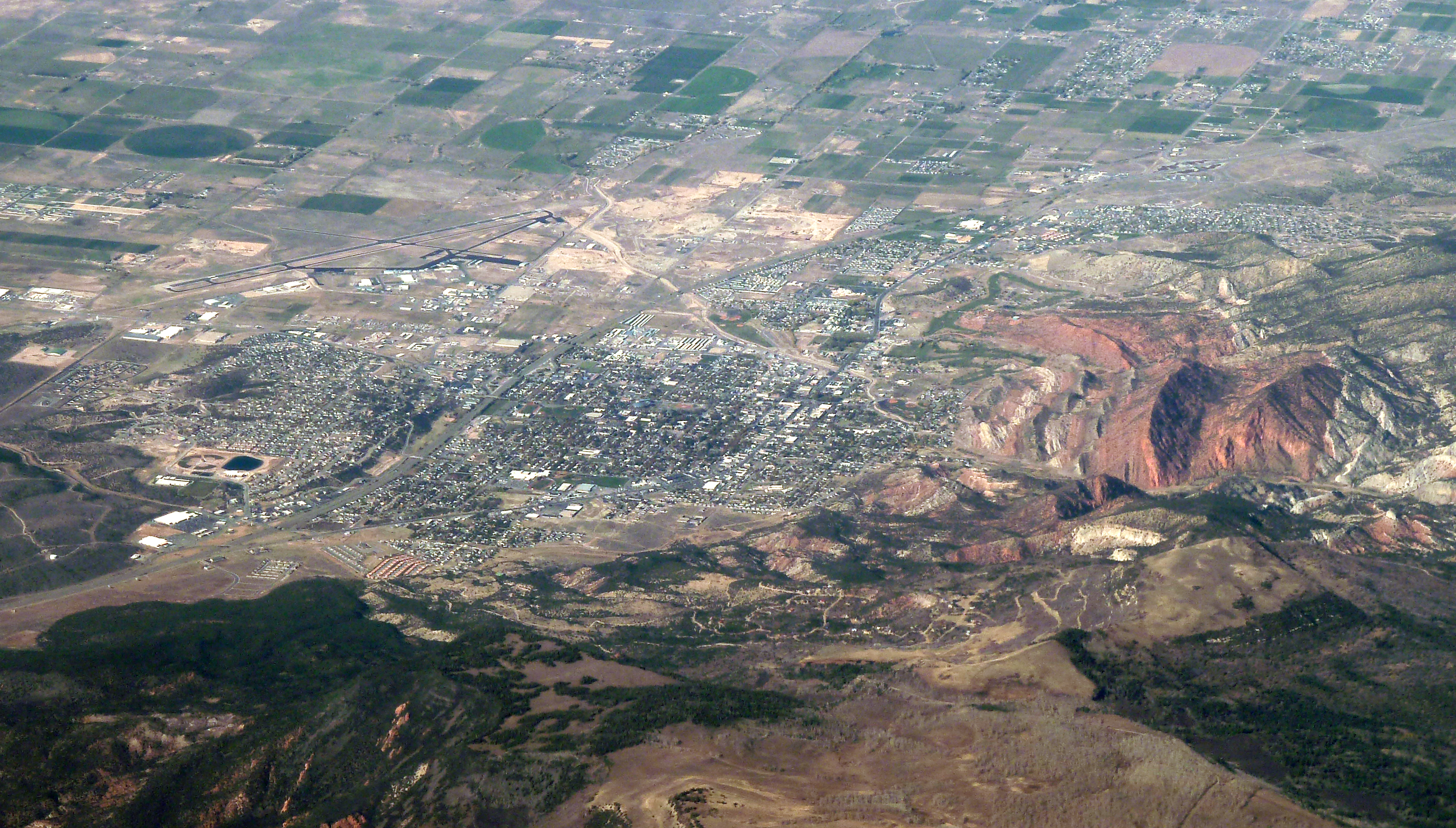
Aerial photo of Cedar City.

Historical population
Census	Pop.	Note	%±
1860	301		—
1870	517		71.8%
1880	691		33.7%
1890	967		39.9%
1900	1,425		47.4%
1910	1,705		19.6%
1920	2,462		44.4%
1930	3,615		46.8%
1940	4,695		29.9%
1950	6,106		30.1%
1960	7,543		23.5%
1970	8,946		18.6%
1980	10,972		22.6%
1990	13,443		22.5%
2000	20,527		52.7%
2010	28,857		40.6%
2020	35,235		22.1%
U.S. Decennial Census

=== 2020 census ===
As of the 2020 census, Cedar City had a population of 35,235. The median age was 26.2 years. 26.5% of residents were under the age of 18 and 11.7% of residents were 65 years of age or older. For every 100 females there were 97.9 males, and for every 100 females age 18 and over there were 95.2 males age 18 and over.

95.2% of residents lived in urban areas, while 4.8% lived in rural areas.

There were 11,824 households in Cedar City, of which 35.8% had children under the age of 18 living in them. Of all households, 52.3% were married-couple households, 17.8% were households with a male householder and no spouse or partner present, and 23.7% were households with a female householder and no spouse or partner present. About 20.8% of all households were made up of individuals and 7.8% had someone living alone who was 65 years of age or older.

There were 12,723 housing units, of which 7.1% were vacant. The homeowner vacancy rate was 1.1% and the rental vacancy rate was 4.8%.

Racial composition as of the 2020 census
Race	Number	Percent
White	29,506	83.7%
Black or African American	377	1.1%
American Indian and Alaska Native	805	2.3%
Asian	542	1.5%
Native Hawaiian and Other Pacific Islander	215	0.6%
Some other race	1,449	4.1%
Two or more races	2,341	6.6%
Hispanic or Latino (of any race)	3,821	10.8%

=== 2000 census ===
As of the census of 2000, there were 20,527 people, 6,486 households, and 4,682 families residing in the city. The population density was 1,021.8 people per square mile (394.5 people/km^{2}). There were 7,109 housing units at an average density of 353.9 per square mile (136.6/km^{2}). The racial makeup of the city was 92.06% White, 2.53% African American, 1.11% Native American, 0.47% Asian, 0.33% Pacific Islander, 1.65% from other races, and 1.86% from two or more races. Hispanic or Latino of any race were 4.14% of the population.

There were 6,486 households, out of which 39.0% had children under the age of 18 living with them, 59.8% were married couples living together, 9.1% had a female householder with no husband present, and 27.8% were non-families. 16.3% of all households were made up of individuals, and 5.8% had someone living alone who was 65 years of age or older. The average household size was 3.07 and the average family size was 3.37.

In the city, the population was spread out, with 28.2% under the age of 18, 27.4% from 18 to 24, 22.6% from 25 to 44, 14.0% from 45 to 64, and 7.8% who were 65 years of age or older. The median age was 23 years. For every 100 females, there were 95.6 males. For every 100 females age 18 and over, there were 91.0 males.

The median income for a household in the city was $32,403, and the median income for a family was $37,509. Males had a median income of $31,192 versus $19,601 for females. The per capita income for the city was $14,057. About 14.5% of the families and 22.1% of the population were below the poverty line, including 20.2% of those under the age of 18 and 4.2% of those 65 and older.

== Education ==
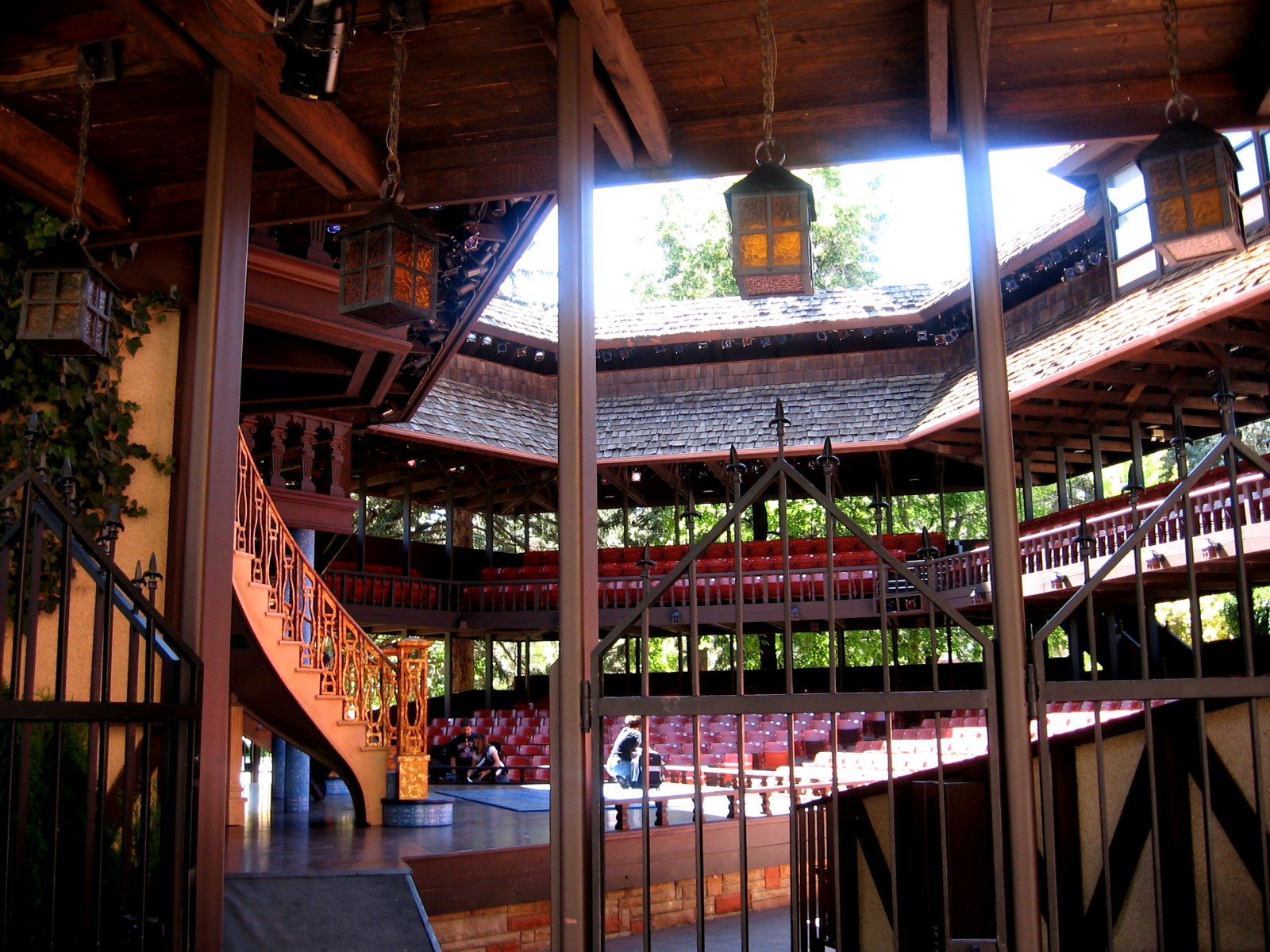
Adams Memorial Theatre at Southern Utah University

Cedar City is served by the Iron County School District.

Cedar City is home of two High Schools, Cedar High School and Canyon View High School.

Cedar City is home to Southern Utah University.

== Economy ==
The economy is mostly centered on a small manufacturing hub, tourism, Southern Utah University, and home construction. The largest employers in Cedar City (2019 data) are listed below.

Employer	Number of Employees
Southern Utah University	2000-2999
Iron County School District (Public Education)	1000-1999
Intermountain Health (formerly Intermountain Healthcare)	500-1500
Cedar City Corporation (Government Services)	250-499
Genpak (Packaging Manufacturing)	250-499
Federal Government (Government Services)	250-499
State of Utah (Government Services)	250-499
Walmart	250-499

== Transportation ==
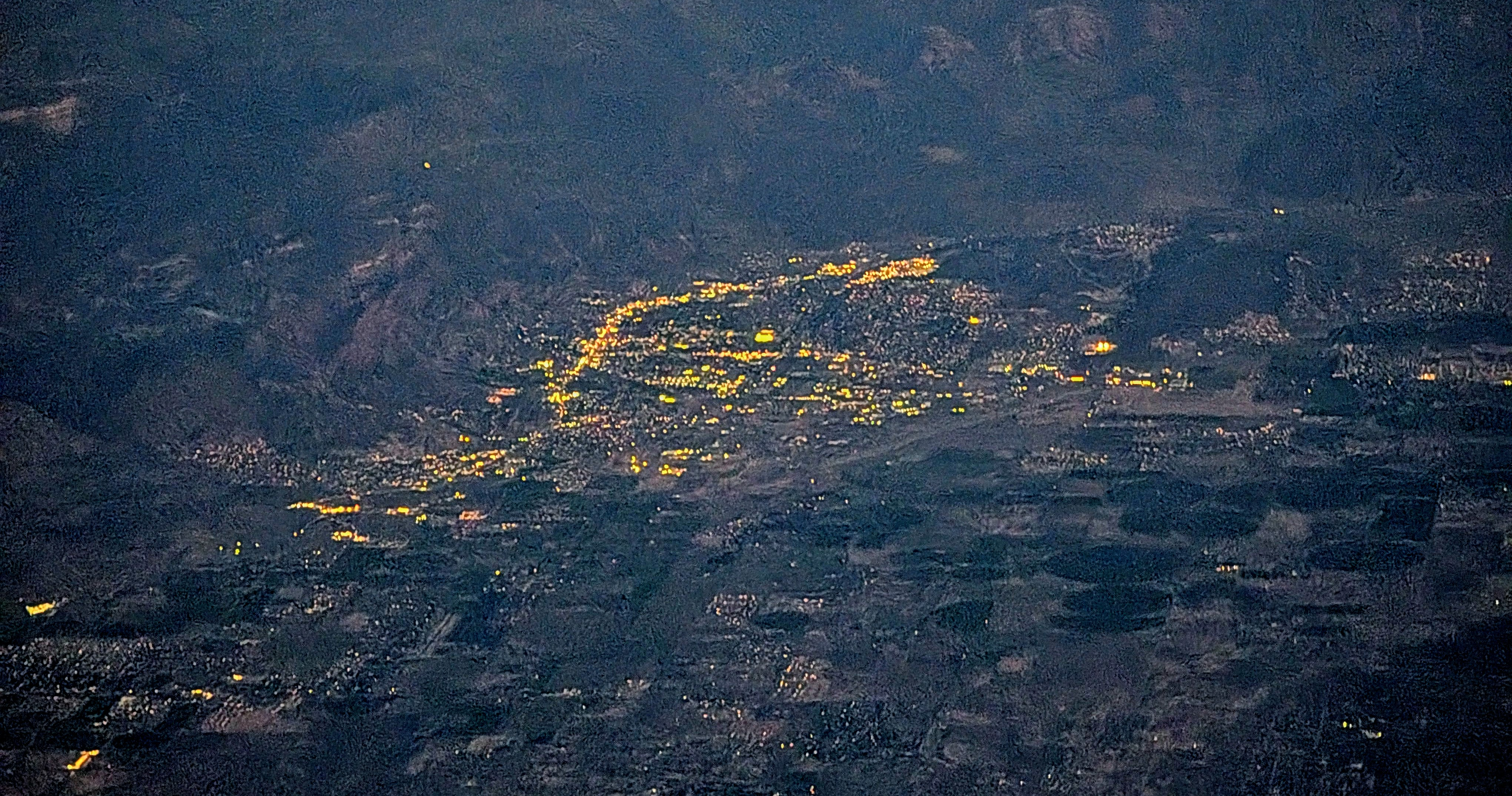
Aerial view of Cedar City at dusk, with municipal airport runway to the lower right of city

Interstate 15 connects the city with St. George (50 miles) and Las Vegas (170 miles) to the southwest, and to Interstate 70 (75 miles) and Salt Lake City (250 miles) to the north. State roads connect Cedar City with Panaca, Nevada, near US 93 (80 miles); and to Kanab, via US-89 (80 miles). Similar to St. George, the city enjoys an excellent location on the West's regional transportation network. Los Angeles is 439 miles (707 km) southwest and San Diego is 500 miles (800 km) southwest on Interstate 15, Phoenix is 465 miles (748 km) south via Interstate 15 and US-93, and Denver is 580 miles (930 km) northeast via Interstates 15 and 70.

A branch line of the Union Pacific Railroad serves customers on the city's western outskirts. The branch connects to the railway's main line at Lund.

Cedar City Regional Airport offers flights via Delta Connection.

Cedar City is served by a local bus system.

== Notable people ==
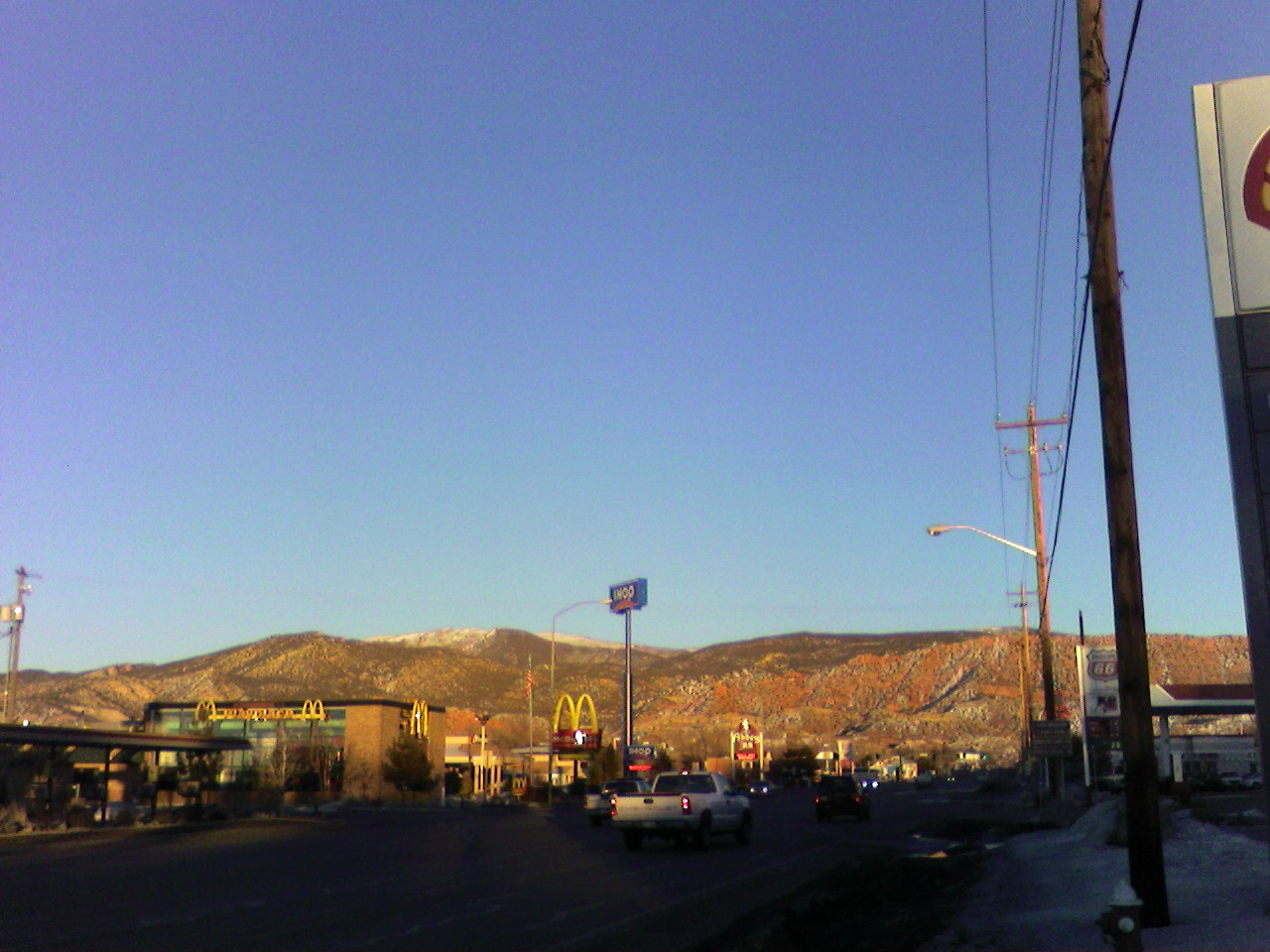
The mountains east of Cedar City at sunset

- Christine Cavanaugh (1963–2014), voice actress
- Lamar Clark, boxer; born in Cedar City
- Ally Condie, author
- Melvin Dummar (1944–2018), claimed heir of Howard Hughes
- Riley Griffiths, actor
- Mike Leavitt, former Utah governor, former administrator of the United States Environmental Protection Agency, and former secretary of the U.S. Department of Health and Human Services; born and educated in Cedar City
- Celeste Maloy, U.S. representative for Utah
- L. E. Modesitt Jr., author
- Doug Murdoch, author
- Del Parson, artist; lives in Cedar City
- Helen Foster Snow, journalist
- Mitch Talbot, professional baseball player; born in Cedar City

== See also ==
- List of cities and towns in Utah
- Dixie National Forest
- Groovefest American Music Festival
