= Iron County School District =

School district in Cedar City, Utah

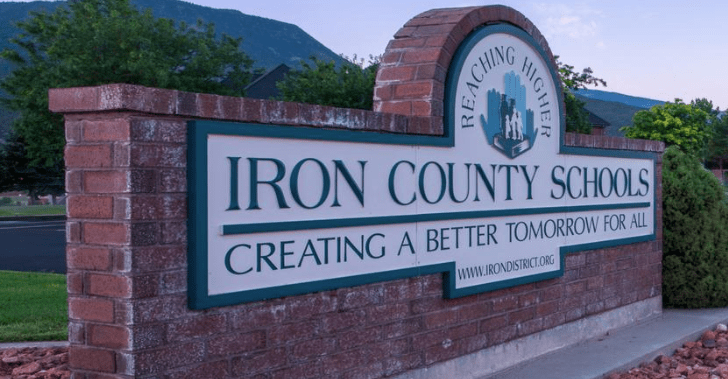
- sign located outside the school district office building

Location
- Cedar City, Utah United States

District information
- Type: Public
- Motto: Creating a Better Tomorrow for All
- Grades: K–12
- Established: December 23, 1851; 174 years ago
- Superintendent: Dr. Lance Hatch
- Schools: Nine elementary schools Two middle schools Five high schools
- NCES District ID: 4900390

Students and staff
- Students: 9,923

Other information
- Website: irondistrict.org

Iron County School District is a school district in Cedar City, Utah.

The first school in Iron County was dedicated on December 23, 1851, in Parowan, Utah. In 1853, school was also held in Cedar City at the Old Fort. In 1856, the first school in Cedar city was built. Today, Iron County School District has eight secondary schools, nine elementary schools, and two preschools. It has a total enrollment of approximately 8,900 students.

== Schools ==
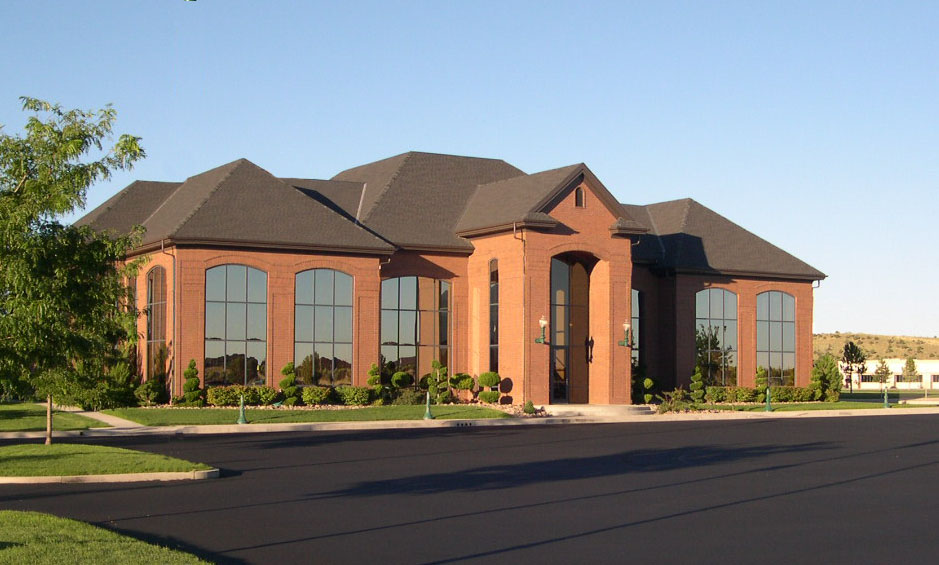
Iron County School District office, August 2005

- High schools:
  - Canyon View High School, Cedar City website
  - Cedar High School, Cedar City website
  - Parowan High School, Parowan website
  - Southwest Education Academy website
  - Launch High School website
- Middle schools:
  - Canyon View Middle School, Cedar City website
  - Cedar Middle School, Cedar City website
- Elementary schools:
  - East Elementary website
  - Enoch Elementary website
  - Escalante Valley Elementary website
  - Fiddlers Canyon Elementary website
  - Iron Springs Elementary website
  - North Elementary website
  - Parowan Elementary website
  - South Elementary website
  - Three Peaks Elementary website
- Other schools:
  - Gateway Preparatory Academy (not part of Iron County School District), Enoch City website
  - Preschool website
  - SUCCESS Academy, Cedar City website

== School board ==
The school district is managed by a five-member school board, one from each of the five component districts.

== See also ==
- List of school districts in Utah
