= Provo School District =

Public school district in Provo, Utah, United States

Provo City School District

Location
- 280 West 940 North; Provo, Utah 84604; United States

District information
- Grades: K - 12
- Established: 1898
- Superintendent: Wendy Dau

Other information
- Website: provo.edu

The Provo City School District is a school district in Provo, Utah, United States, which has boundaries that almost entirely coincide with those of the city, except for one small portion.

== Description ==
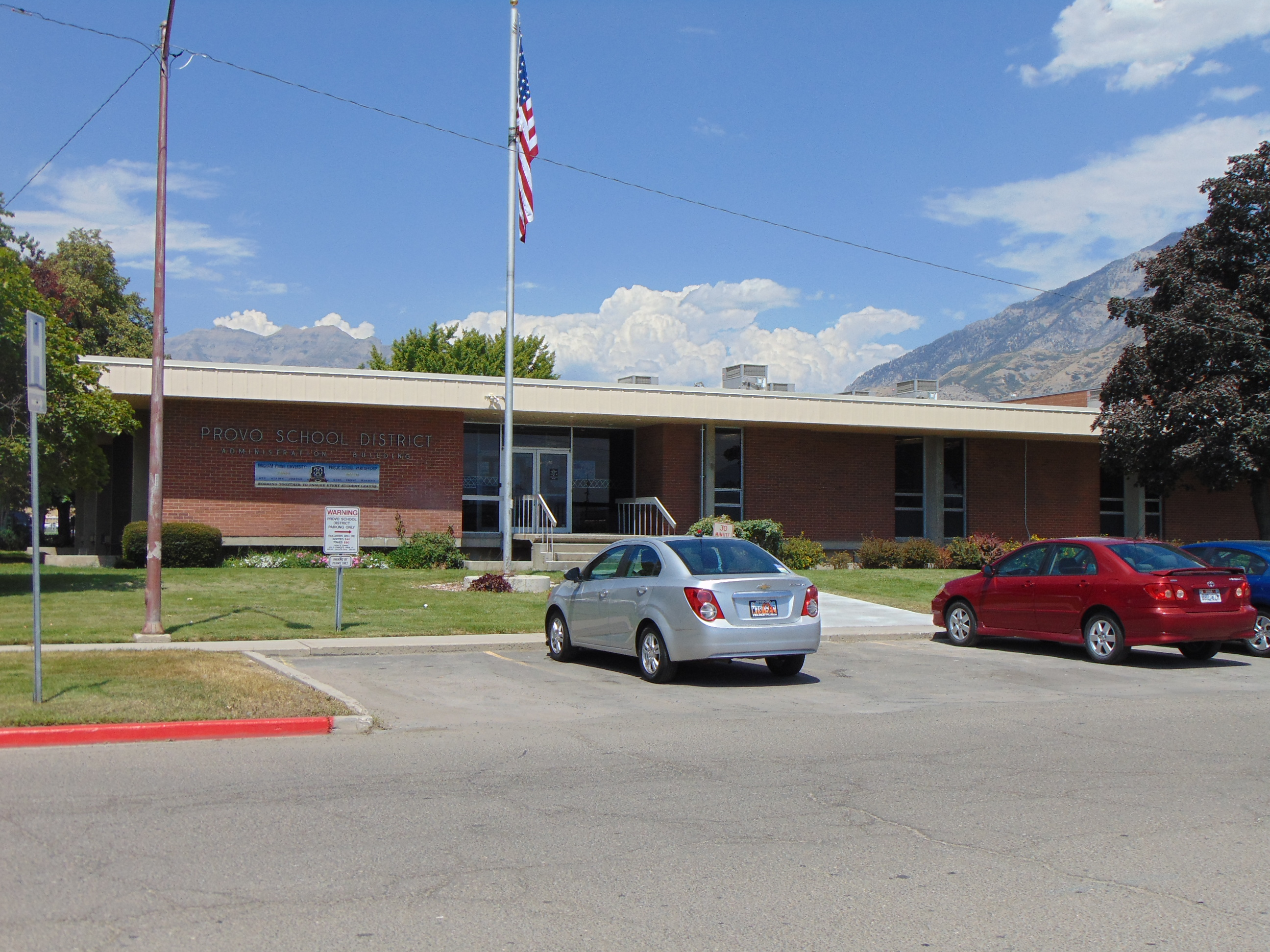
Provo City School District offices, August 2016

The school district is run by a school board elected by city residents. The districts for electing the school board members are drawn by the Provo City Council. There are currently 17,800 students enrolled.

The district operates two traditional high schools, an alternative high school, two middle schools, thirteen elementary schools, and a web-based school that serves all grade levels. The district continues to have a positive influence on the community by offering both traditional and proven non-traditional education to its students. These non-traditional alternatives include preschool training for disabled students, adult high school completion, the largest selection of on-line courses in the state and concurrent enrollment where students can earn high school and college credits simultaneously. Programs such as advanced placement, special education, music, career technology, elementary dual language, multicultural programs, gifted and talented programs and many other enrichment programs in all curriculum areas are offered by the district. The district has strong technical and foreign language programs in both traditional and online offerings, and is one of the few Districts in the state to offer elementary foreign languages.

== Board of education ==
As of January 24, 2021, the following individuals comprised the Provo City School District Board of Education:

Melanie Hall - President – District 2

Assigned Schools: Rock Canyon, Centennial

Rebecca Nielsen - Vice President - District 6

Assigned Schools: Lakeview, Westridge

Nate Bryson - District 1

Assigned Schools: Canyon Crest, Edgemont, Timpview

McKay Jensen - District 3

Assigned Schools: Wasatch

Jennifer Partridge - District 4

Assigned Schools: Provost, Provo Peaks, Spring Creek

Teri McCabe - President – District 5

Assigned Schools: Amelia, Franklin, Sunset View

Gina Hales - District 7

Assigned Schools: Timpanogos, Dixon, Independence, Provo High

== District Administration ==
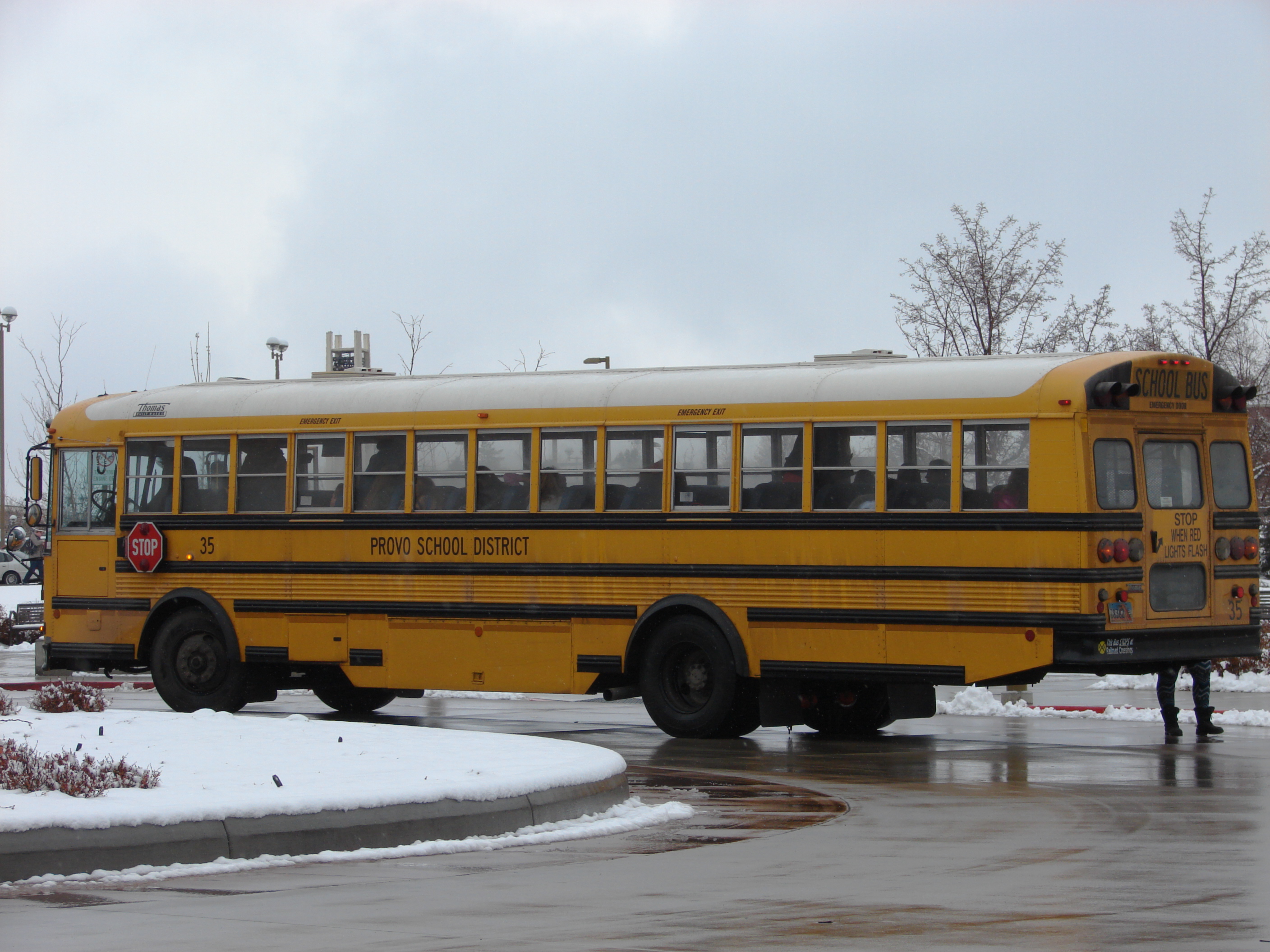
Provo City School District bus, January 2016

As of July 25, 2017, Provo City School District Administration was:

Wendy Dau - Superintendent (as of 2023)

Douglas Finch - Assistant Superintendent over Student Services

Anne-Marie Harrison - Assistant Superintendent over Teaching and Learning

Jarod Sites - Director of Human Resources

Rebecca Rogers - Director of Human Resource - Classified Employees and Benefits

Stefanie Bryant - Business Administrator

Devyn Dayley - Director of Accounting

Laura Larsen - Director of Child Nutrition

Alex Judd - Assistant Superintendent over Elementary Education

Todd McKee - Assistant Superintendent over Secondary Education

Mark Wheeler - Director of Facilities

Suraj Syal - Director of Special Education

Chad Duncan - Director of Technology

Caleb Price - Coordinator of Communications and Public Relations

== Opportunities for the Gifted and Talented ==
=== Magnet schools ===
Students who qualify are invited to attend the Center for Accelerated Studies (CAS) for students in grades four through six. This school caters to the needs of gifted students. The Gifted Magnet Program in the district is for students in grades seven through eight and provides services to students who score in the top ten on a test by giving them access to high school-level material while remaining with their middle school-aged peers. This program has been updated and is now folded into the two middle schools in the district: Dixon Middle School and Centennial Middle School.

== Dual Language Immersion Programs ==
The Dual Language Immersion program gives elementary students the opportunity to become fluent in an additional language by the time he or she exits the sixth grade.

Schools with Dual Language Immersion Programs:

- Canyon Crest Elementary—Spanish
- Edgemont Elementary—French
- Timpanogos Elementary—Spanish
- Wasatch Elementary—Mandarin Chinese
- Lakeview Elementary—Portuguese

== Provo School District Foundation ==
The Provo School District Foundation facilitates charitable giving that fund programs and services not provided by the state or federal government, including after-school activities. The Foundation passes resources from contributors to the schools, classrooms and programs that need the most assistance, or can be designated to the entity the donor sees most fit.

== Schools ==
=== High schools ===
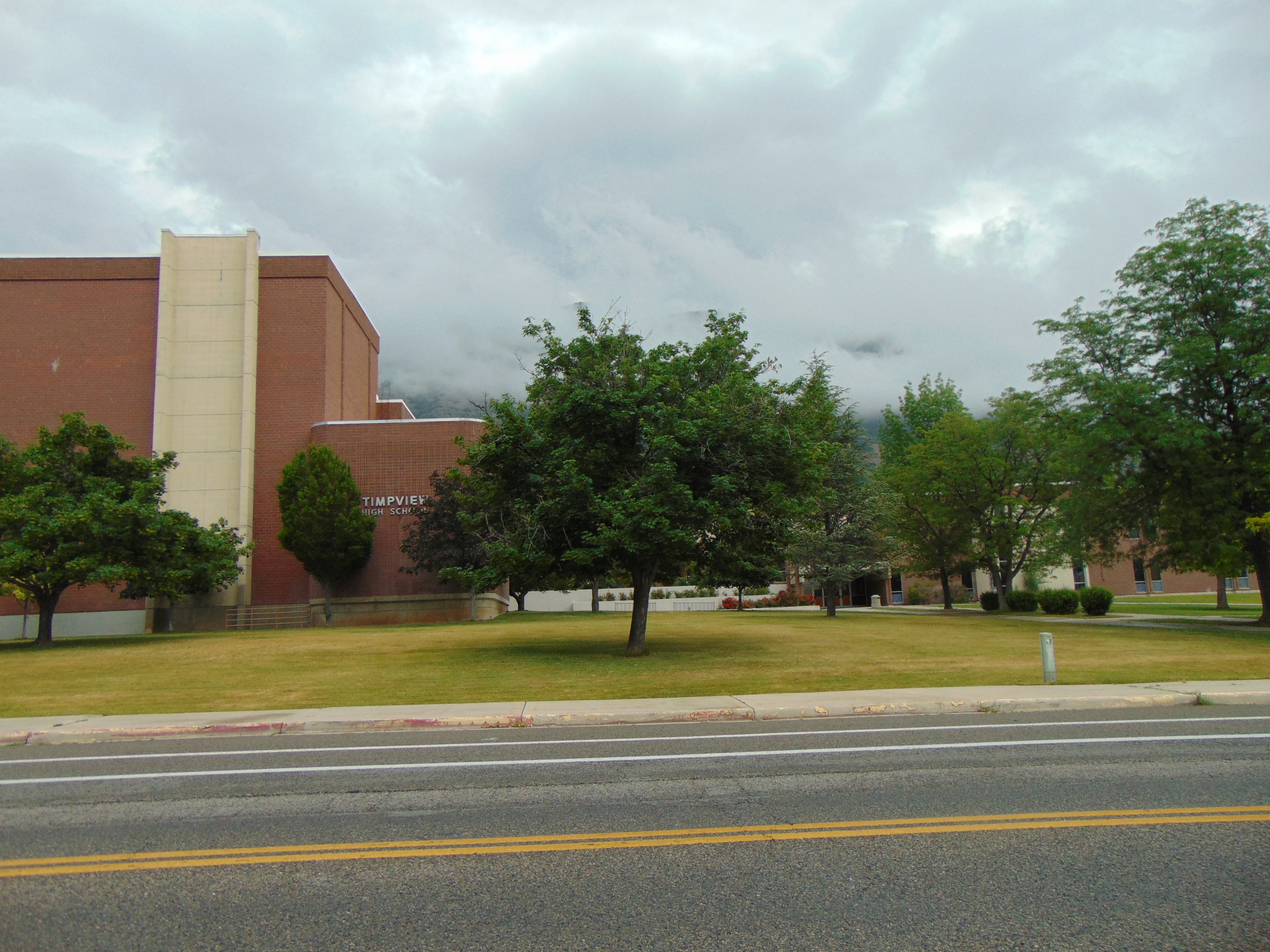
Timpview High School, June 2016

- Provo High School

Jarod Sites, Principal

- Timpview High School

Momi Tuua, Principal

- Independence High School

Jacob Griffin, Principal

=== Middle schools ===
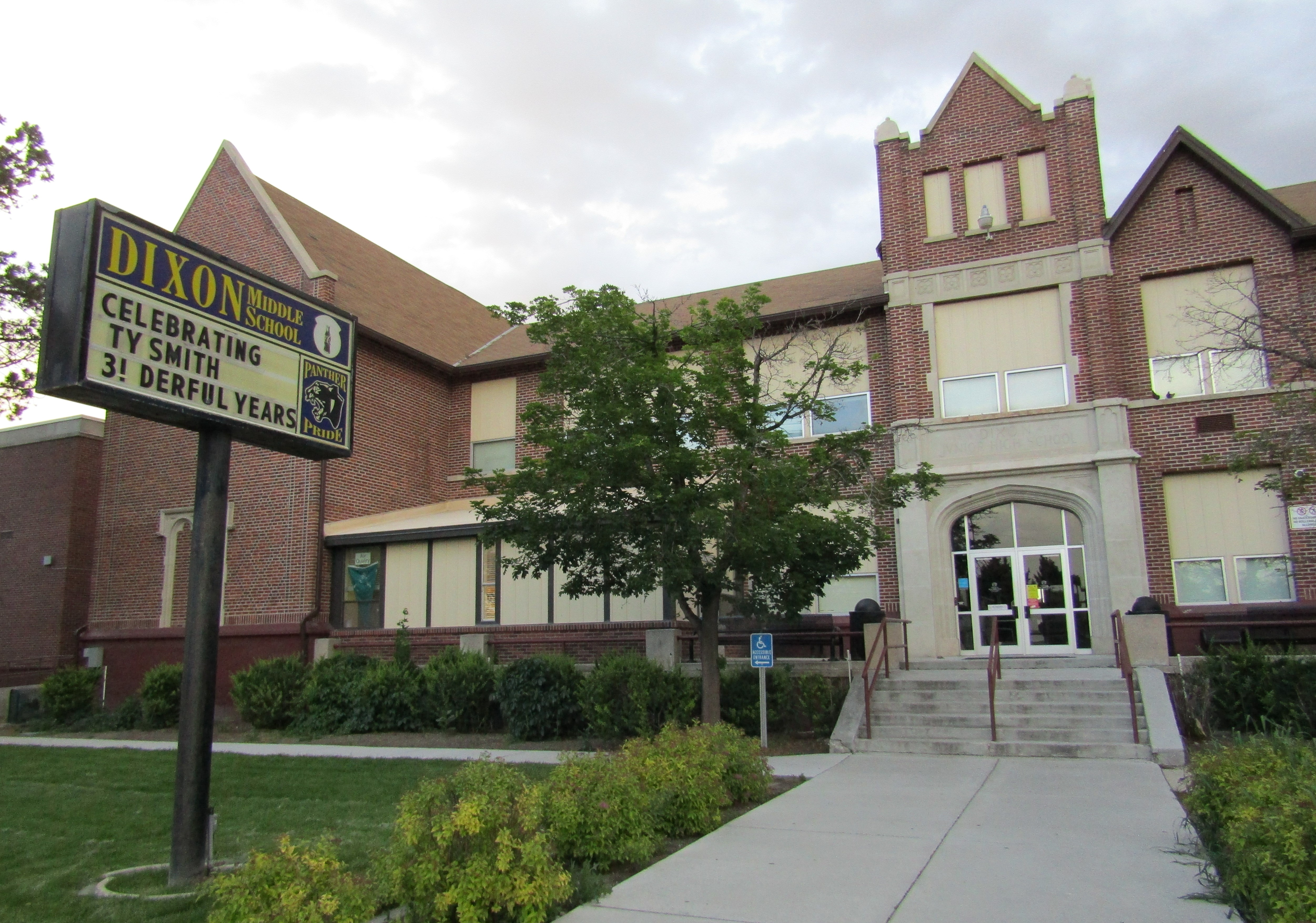
Dixon Middle School, May 2018

- Centennial Middle School

Brooke Taylor, Principal

- Dixon Middle School

John Anderson, Principal

=== Elementary schools ===
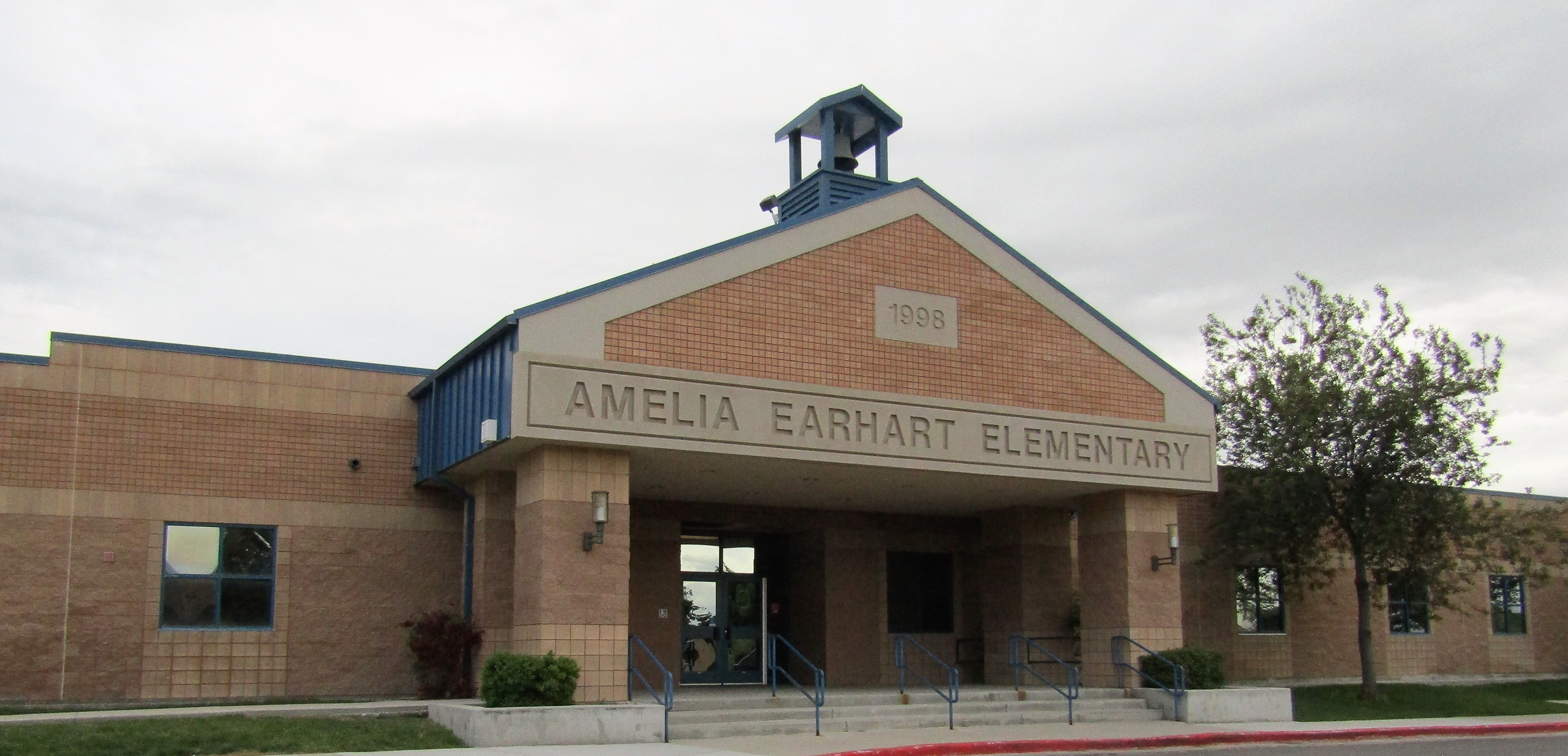
Amelia Earhart Elementary, May 2017

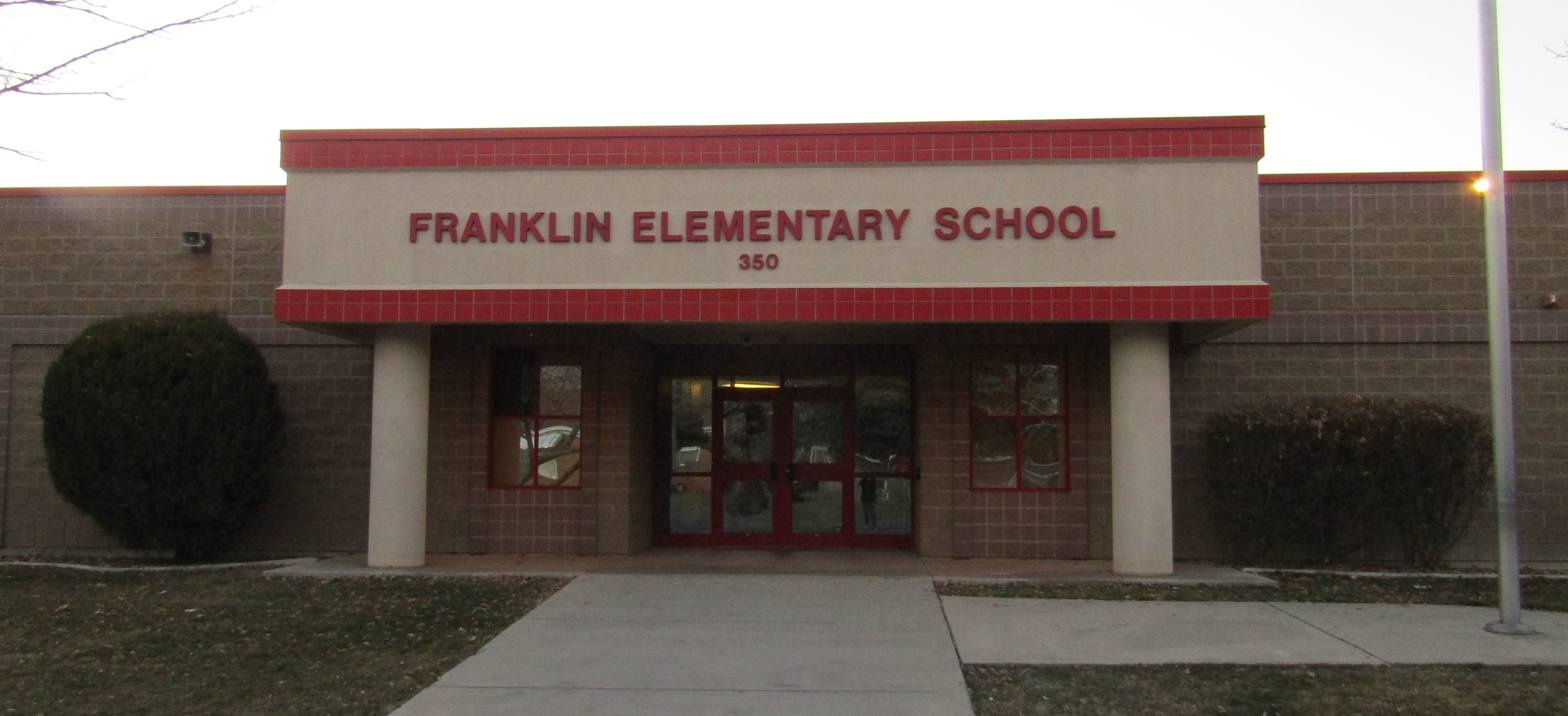
Franklin Elementary School, December 2017

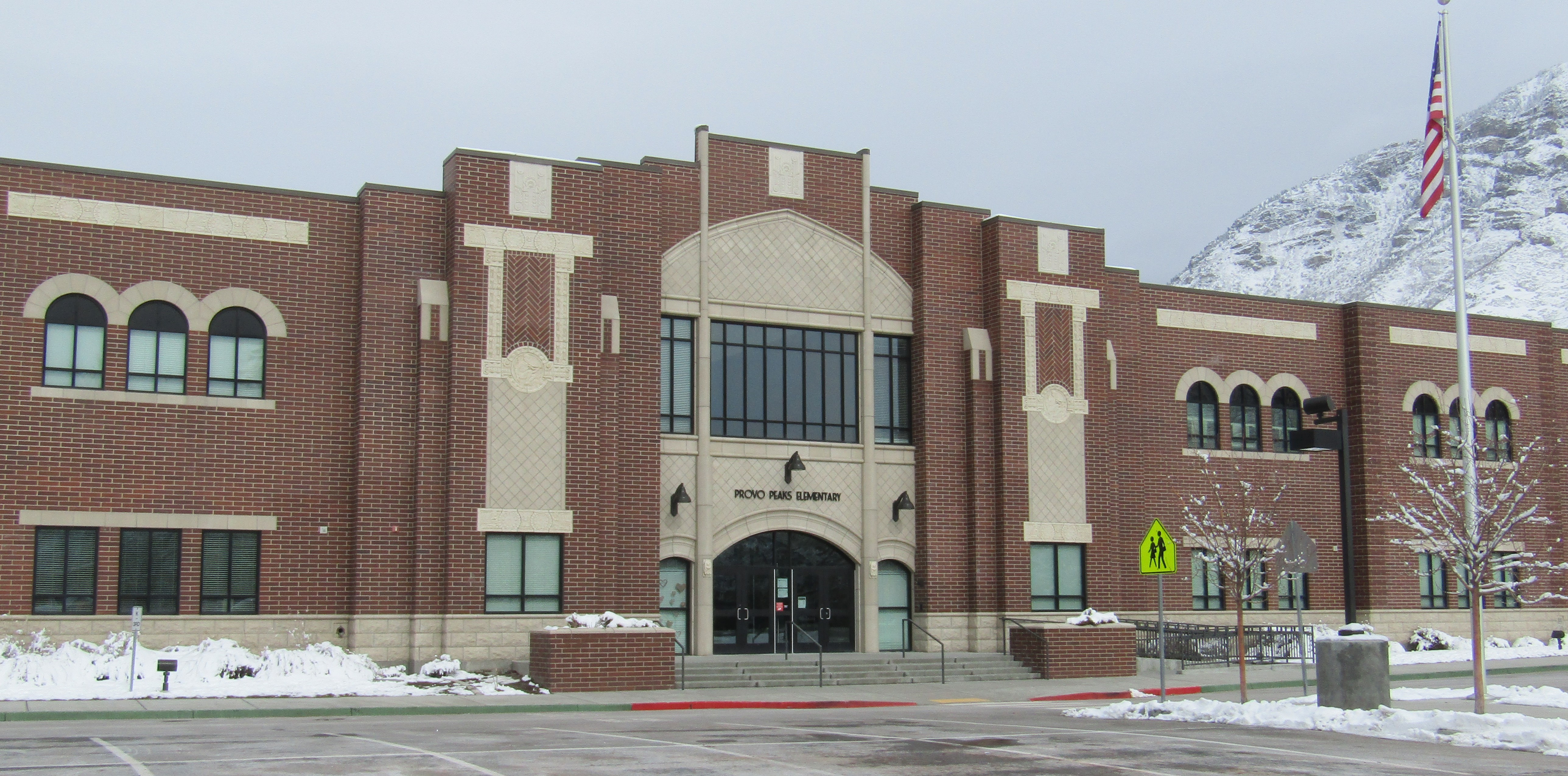
Provo Peaks Elementary, February 2017

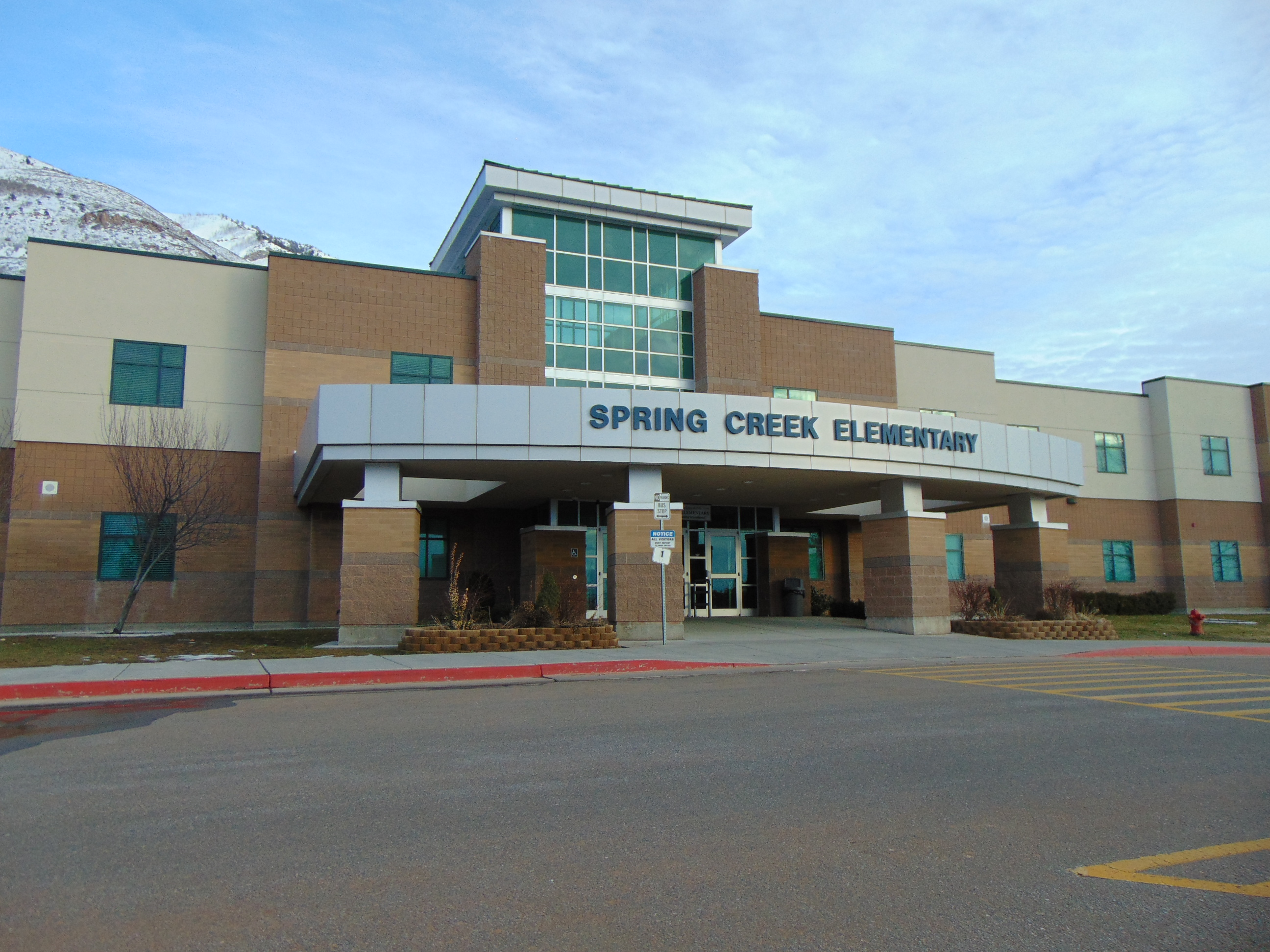
Spring Creek Elementary School, February 2017

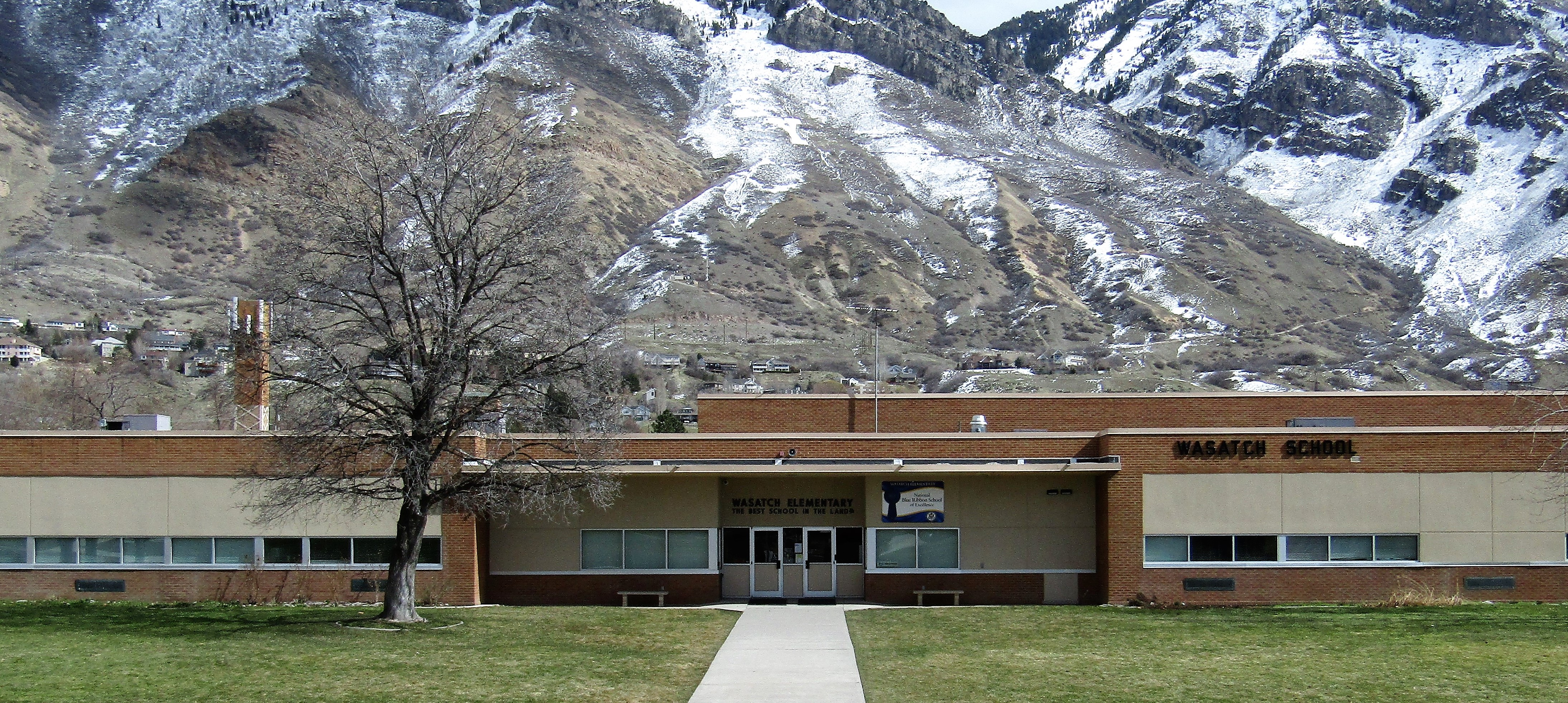
Wasatch Elementary School, March 2017

- Amelia Earhart Elementary School

Ryan McCarty, Principal

- Canyon Crest Elementary School

Sean Edwards, Principal

- Edgemont Elementary School

Harmony Kartchner, Principal

- Franklin Elementary School

Jason Benson, Principal

- Lakeview Elementary School

Jamie Leite, Principal

- Provo Peaks Elementary School

Mark Burge, Principal

- Provost Elementary School

Kami Alvarez, Principal

- Rock Canyon Elementary School

Seth Hansen Principal

- Spring Creek Elementary School

Ruthann Snow, Principal

- Sunset View Elementary School

Chris Chilcoat, Principal

- Timpanogos Elementary School

Carrie Rawlins, Principal

- Wasatch Elementary School

Chris Furhiman, Principal

- Westridge Elementary School

Kim Hawkins, Principal

=== Specialized Schools ===
- Provo Adult Education

Nikki Wake, Principal

- Provo Transition Services/East Bay Post High

Brent McCabe, Principal

- Sunrise Preschool

, Facilitator

- Oak Springs School

Travis Cook, Principal

- Adult ESOL

Teresa Tavares, Principal

- E-School

Brad Monks, Principal

== See also ==
- List of school districts in Utah
