= Nebo School District =

School district in Utah, United States

Location
- 350 South Main; Spanish Fork, Utah; Utah County United States

District information
- Motto: Your Partner in Education
- Grades: PK–12
- Superintendent: Rick Nielsen
- Schools: 49
- NCES District ID: 4900630

Students and staff
- Students: 43,696 (2024–25)
- Teachers: 1623.63 (on an FTE basis)
- Student–teacher ratio: 26.91

Other information
- Website: www.nebo.edu

Nebo School District is a public school district that serves the southern part of Utah County.

== Description ==
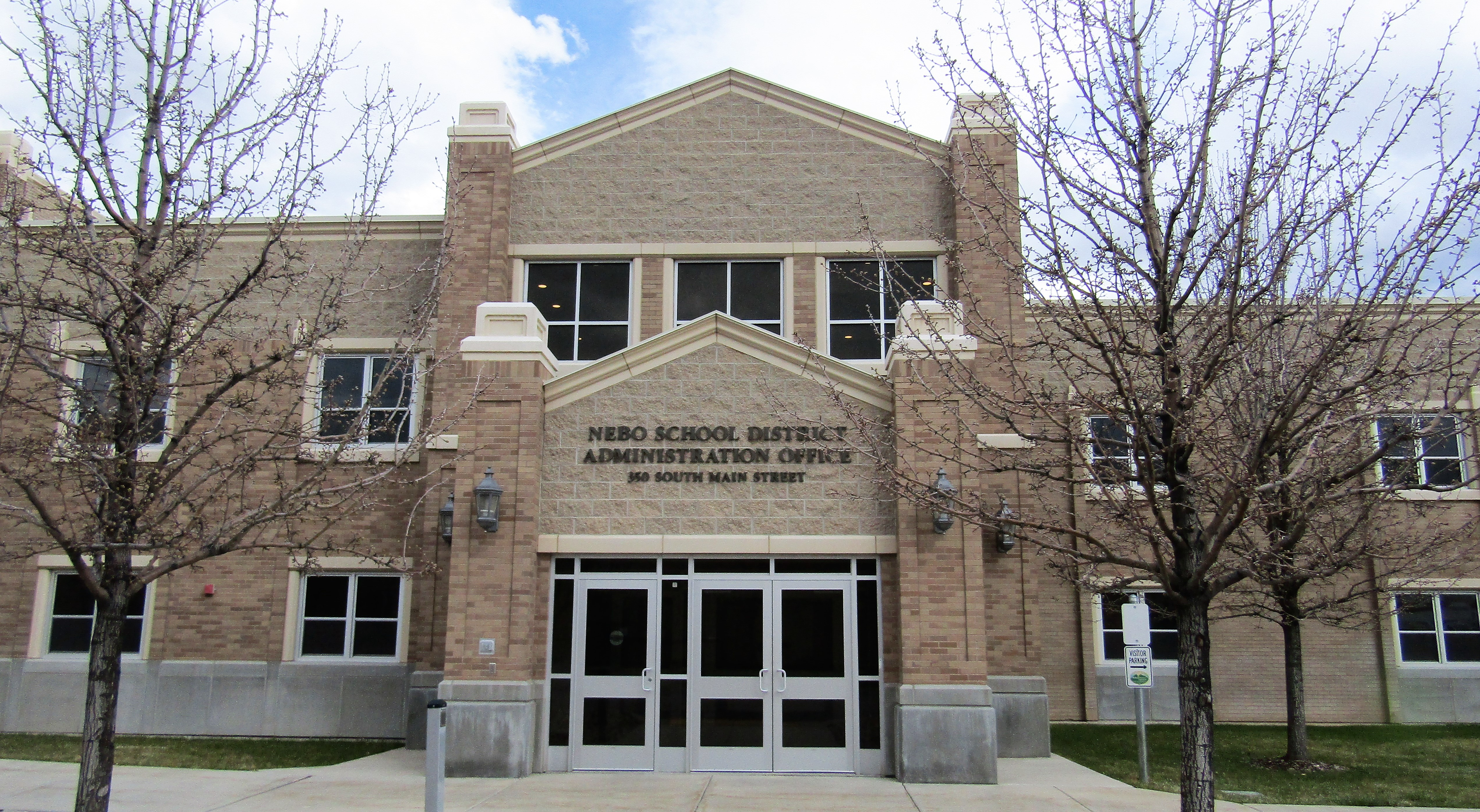
Nebo School District main offices

The district covers more than 1,300 square miles. It is named for nearby Mount Nebo, the tallest peak in the Wasatch Range. The district borders the Alpine, Provo City, Wasatch County, North Sanpete, Juab, and Tintic School Districts.

With more than 42,000 students, Nebo is the seventh largest school district in Utah. The district operates 31 elementary schools (grades K–5), five middle schools (grades 6–7), five junior high schools (grades 8–9), and six high schools (grades 10–12). It also operates various alternative-education programs.

== High schools ==
=== Payson High ===
Established in 1912, the previous building was finished in 1967, with a new building announced in 2023 and completed for the 2025-2026 school year. The student body comes from Payson, as well as from a number of nearby communities such as Santaquin, Goshen, Genola, and Elberta. The current principal is Jesse Sorenson. The school's mascot is the Lions, named in support for the local Lions Club in 1928. Payson High was used as a filming location for the 1984 film Footloose. Payson was originally inhabited by the indigenous Ute giving Payson historical significance. Payson High School is notable for its academic and CTE (Career and Technical Education) programs, including a social media team that oversees @payson_lions Instagram and TikTok accounts as some of the largest high school social media profiles in the country.

=== Spanish Fork High ===
Originally built in 1962 with a new building having been finished in 2024, Spanish Fork High was the first high school in the Nebo School District. It covers the city of Spanish Fork and outlying communities. The school principal is Matt Christensen. The school mascot is the Mighty Dons, and its colors are red and gray.

=== Salem Hills High ===
Opened on August 20, 2008, Salem Hills was the first new high school constructed by the Nebo School District since the 1970s. Students come from Payson, Salem, Elk Ridge, and Woodland Hills. The school principal is Ryan McGuire. Its mascot is a Skyhawk, with school colors light blue, navy blue, and gold. In December 2008, Salem Hills was awarded the "2008 Best K-12 Education Project Design" by the Intermountain Contractors for the State of Utah.

In 2021, Salem Hills High the National Performing Arts School of Excellence award. This makes them the first high school in Utah to receive the award.

== Junior high schools ==
- Mapleton Junior High

Jo Lynn Ford, Principal

- Payson Junior High

Kevin Mecham, Principal

- Spanish Fork Junior High

Saia Naulu, Principal

- Springville Junior High

Tiffanie Miley, Principal

- Salem Junior High

Keith Richards, Principal

== Middle schools ==
- Spring Canyon Middle School (Springville)

Alison Hansen, Principal

- Maple Grove Middle School (Mapleton)

Nate Whitney, Principal

- Mt. Nebo Middle School (Payson)

Kelly Taylor, Principal

- Valley View Middle School (Salem)

David Knudsen, Principal

- Diamond Fork Middle School (Spanish Fork)

Dr. Brenda Burr, Principal

== Elementary schools ==
- Apple Valley (Santaquin)
- Art City (Springville)
- Barnett (Payson)
- Brockbank (Spanish Fork)
- Brookside (Springville)
- Canyon (Spanish Fork)
- Cherry Creek (Springville)
- East Meadows (Spanish Fork)
- Foothills (Salem)
- Goshen (Goshen)
- Hobble Creek (Mapleton)
- Larsen (Spanish Fork)
- Maple Ridge (Mapleton)
- Mapleton (Mapleton)
- Meadow Brook (Springville)
- Mount Loafer (Salem)
- Orchard Hills (Santaquin)
- Park (Spanish Fork)
- Parkview (Payson)
- Rees (Spanish Fork)
- Riverview (Spanish Fork)
- Salem (Salem)
- Sage Creek (Springville)
- Santaquin (Santaquin)
- Sierra Bonita (Spanish Fork)
- Spanish Oaks (Spanish Fork)
- Spring Lake (Payson)
- Taylor (Payson)
- Westside (Springville)
- Wilson (Payson)
