= Emery County School District =

School district in Utah, United States

Emery County School District, also known as the Emery School District, is a school district headquartered in Huntington, Utah.

Its boundary is parallel with that of Emery County.

== History ==
Dennis Nelson served as superintendent until 1987, when he stated he would retire from the position.

In May 2021 the board of trustees decided that Jason Strate be the superintendent. In June 2021 the board decided that Ryan Maughan will be the new superintendent.

== Schools ==
High schools

- Emery High School
  - In previous eras it was common for people visiting the school and students to have firearms within their vehicles due to the firearm-centric culture of Emery County. By 1999 the district made plans to stop this practice in wake of Utah state laws prohibiting the practice.
- Green River High School

Middle schools

- Canyon View Middle School
- San Rafael Middle School

Elementary schools

- Book Cliff Elementary School
- Castle Dale Elementary School
- Cleveland Elementary School
- Cottonwood Elementary School
  - It opened in 1967 and was a continuation of the former Orangeville Elementary School.
- Ferron Elementary School
- Huntington Elementary School
