= Utah Dineh Corporation Inc =

The Utah Dineh Corporation is a nonprofit organization which was established in order to maintain the Utah Navajo Oil Reserve revenues in the Aneth Oil Field section of Utah. Much of this area is within the Utah Navajo side of San Juan County, Utah.

The Special Trustee for American Indians testified to the House Committee on Natural Resources and stated that his office did not have the capacity to administer the Utah Navajo Trust Fund in a manner required by the 1933 Act.

Currently, the decision to grant the Utah Dineh Corps the ability to maintain the oil-royalty trust fund is still being decided at a senatorial level in the US Senate.

== History ==
According to the testimony from Ross Swimmer, it was appropriate for either the Navajo Nation or a nonprofit organization made up of Navajo citizens to serve as the trustee, thus it opened the door to will allow the Utah Navajos an opportunity they have never been able to fully experience—that experience known as self-determination. Therefore, the Utah Dineh Corp. was established to maintain these Oil Revenue Funds

On June 16, 2008, Navajo Nation Council Delegates Kenneth Maryboy, Davis Filfred, Mark Maryboy, and San Juan County Commissioner-Elect Phil Lyman of Blanding, Utah traveled to Washington, D.C. to present a working model of how an easy transition from the State of Utah handling Utah Navajo royalty money, to a functioning Utah Navajo organization before Congress.

Also, December 8, 2009, The U.S. Senate Indian Affairs Committee conducted two hearings that Wednesday morning. The back-to-back hearings which took place in Room 628 Dirksen Senate Office Building, in Washington, D.C.

== Senate Bill 1690 ==
Senate Bill 1690 is a bill to amend the Act of March 1, 1933, to transfer certain authority and resources to the Utah Dineh Corporation, and for other purposes. It is a bill sponsored by Rep. Robert Bennett(R-UT).

The Utah Navajos would then utilize this non-profit organization in creating the Utah Dineh Corporation. This corporation has a board of directors with members from each Utah Chapter. The Utah Dineh Corporation is a Utah Nonprofit Corporation organized for the specific purpose of fulfilling the mandate of the 1933 and 1968 Acts.

The Corporation would contract with a private investment firm for money management and establish processes whereby the money collected and investment earned will be used to further the intent of the trust fund.

== Intent of the Utah Dineh Corp. ==
The intent of S.1690 is to designate a new trustee in the manner recommend by Mr. Swimmer and, in doing so, allow the Utah Navajos to manage their own assets.

San Juan County, Utah provides law enforcement, fire protection, emergency medical services, senior services, road maintenance, telecommunication and water services to the seven Utah Navajo chapters in which the Navajo Nation does not. There for the intent of this organization is to provide the monetary means in co-ordinating conjunction with the San Juan County services.

As stated by Council Delegate Maryboy, "The prospect of being able to control millions of dollars generated in Utah, for the benefit of Utah Navajos, seems to have awakened Window Rockʼs otherwise dormant interest in its tribal members who live north of the Arizona border."

== See also ==
- Senate Bill 1690
- Navajo Nation
