= Davis Filfred =

American politician

Navajo Nation Council Delegate
- In office January 22, 2007 – January 10, 2011
- President: Joe Shirley Jr.
- Preceded by: Mark Maryboy
- Succeeded by: Charlaine Tso

Personal details
- Born: 1967 (age 58–59) Cortez, Colorado
- Spouse: Janice Filfred
- Occupation: Public Service (Chapter President, Navajo Tribal Police)

Davis Filfred (born 1967) is an American politician for the Navajo Nation Council Delegate in the Utah Navajo Section.

Davis Filfred succeeded the position of retiring Navajo Councilman, Mark Maryboy on the Navajo Nation election process. Davis Filfred serves the same Navajo Nation districts along with Kenneth Maryboy for his Navajo Nation Council Councilman seat. Filfred also works with Rebecca M. Benally in helping create a more efficient process for the Navajo Nation educational system.

Davis Filfred is also a United States Marine Corps Veteran of the Persian Gulf War (1990–1991).

== Life ==
Filfred graduated from White Horse High School in 1985 and studied one year at the College of Eastern Utah in Blanding, UT. He also spent three years at Utah Technical College in Salt Lake City, Utah and received an A.A.S. Degree in Residential and Industrial Wiring.

Filfred frequently volunteers his time as a leader in the Boy Scouts of America.

== Military life ==
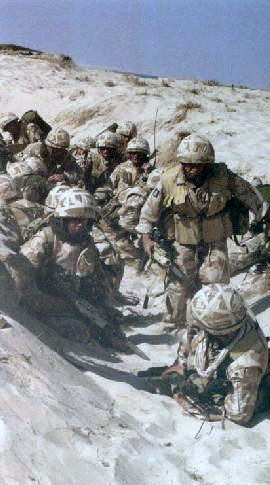
Coalition Soldiers - Operation Desert Shield/Desert Storm 1991

Thru 1990 to 1994, Davis served in the United States Marine Corps and achieved the Rank of Sgt. or pay-grade E-5 for the Marines.

During his enlistment, Filfred served with Marine Corps unit MAG-46 at the former Marine Corps Air Station El Toro near Irvine, California and with the Marine Corps unit MWSS-374 at the former Marine Corps Air Station Tustin located in Tustin, California.

In 1990, the Persian Gulf War broke out after Saddam Hussien's Iraqi forces invaded Kuwait. Marine task forces formed the initial core for Operation Desert Shield/Desert Storm while U.S. and Coalition troops mobilized, and later liberated Kuwait, at which time Filfred along with fellow military men and women were deployed as well during this operation.

After being discharged, he returned to the reservation where he joined with the Navajo Nation Tribal Police in the Shiprock District.

== Community member ==
Filfred began a life in politics, first positioning himself in the Aneth Community as the Vice President of Aneth Chapter, then as Local School Board Secretary at Aneth Community School. Since he is a veteran, Filfred became a representative for the Southeastern Utah Diné Veterans Organization (SUDVO) - and soon after became its Commander.

== Navajo Nation Council Delegate ==
Davis announcing his run for the Navajo Nation Council Delegate seat.

In 2006, Filfred was elected into the legislative body of Navajo Nation Government as a Navajo Nation Council Delegate for the Mexican Water, Aneth and Red Mesa Chapters. These areas expand the Arizona and Utah borders with a constituency of nearly 10,000 people.

Upon election, he was positioned on the Health and Social Services Committee in the Navajo Nation Council as the Northwern Agency Representative.

=== 2006 Navajo election results ===
Aneth Chapter
Davis Filfred 611
Kenneth Maryboy 398
Herman Farley 172
Russell Gould 215

Mexican Water Chapter
Davis Filfred 124
Kenneth Maryboy 254
Herman Farley 134
Russell Gould 119

Red Mesa Chapter
Davis Filfred 195
Kenneth Maryboy 353
Herman Farley 232
Russell Gould 275

=== Special Prosecutor Investigation on Navajo Council ===
In October 2010, Navajo tribal other officials, were charged in an investigation of discretionary funds just weeks before the 2010 November election. Not Guilty was what was pleaded for the Councilmen charged for fraud, conspiracy and theft.

Washington D.C.-based Special prosecutor Alan Balaran reported results on the investigation in which he filed criminal complaints against Vice President Ben Shelly and at least 77 members of the 88-delegate Council as part of a sweeping investigation into the use of discretionary funds that Filfred and Kenneth Maryboy were named in as well.

=== Navajo Nation Council reduction ===
On Dec. 15, 2009, Tribal members voted to reduce the Navajo Tribal Council from 88 to 24 members, and the Navajo Nation Supreme Court ordered immediate implementation of the redistricting in a May 28, 2010 decision.

With this Navajo Nationwide action, it resulting in pitting Councilman Filfred against fellow Councilman Maryboy during the November 2, 2010 General Elections.

Councilman Filfred was defeated by Maryboy for a newly redistricted "Shiprock Agency" section on the Navajo Reservation.

=== 2010 Navajo election results ===
Davis Filfred

Total Votes by Chapter - 1,053

039 - Aneth Chapter 347

028 - Mexican Water Chapter 149

099 - Red Mesa Chapter 261

031 - TeecNosPos Chapter 116

030 - Sweet Water Chapter 180

Kenneth Maryboy

Total Votes by Chapter - 1,114

039 - Aneth Chapter 251

028 - Mexican Water Chapter 173

099 - Red Mesa Chapter 280

031 - TeecNosPos Chapter 230

030 - Sweet Water Chapter 180

(Write-in) "Francis Redhouse"

Total Votes by Chapter - 593

039 - Aneth Chapter 151

028 - Mexican Water Chapter 33

099 - Red Mesa Chapter 84

031 - TeecNosPos Chapter 222

030 - Sweet Water Chapter 103

== Utah Navajo Trust Fund ==
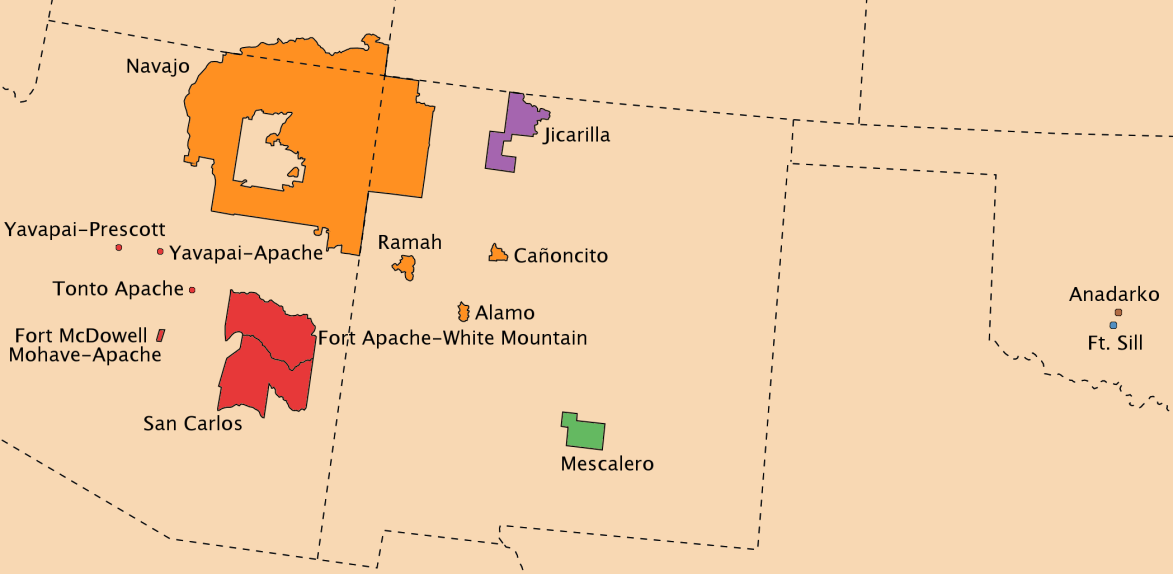
Utah Navajo: Northernmost section of the Navajo Nation (in Orange)

But between 1933 and 1990, the Utah Navajo Oil Trust Fund was plundered of $150 million, according to a Utah legislative auditor's report. The Navajos' lawsuit against the state is still pending. The State of Utah is the only state in the Nation administering a trust fund for the benefit of American Indians whose lands are within state boundaries. The Utah Navajos have sought to have a more active role in the distribution of the royalties and this would present that opportunity. Legislative leadership has committed to provide a way to make the transition process as seamless as possible for the beneficiaries.

Trust Fund to Sunset

Currently since, Utah's Navajo Trust Fund statute is set to sunset in 2008. Utah Governor Jon Huntsman and Legislative Leadership in 2007 have joined together in asking Congress to create a new disbursement system for the royalties. The Utah Legislative leadership are now actively working with the Utah Navajo Element in regards to controlling of these royalties.

Utah Senate Minority Leader Mike Dmitrich saying Our congressional delegation must create a vehicle to distribute these monies in a way that all of the Chapter Houses have input.

Kenneth Maryboy and Davis Filfred have been active in the Utah Navajo Trust fund as well as helping the transition between Utah's Primary role in control the Utah Navajo Trust to the Utah Navajos themselves.

== Utah Navajo oil revenues ==
Recently Council Delegates Kenneth Maryboy, Davis Filfred, and Former Council Delegate Mark Maryboy have been actively working to ensure that the Aneth Oil Royalties stay with the Utah Navajo people.

However such causes are not without competition, the Navajo Nation itself has been working counter to the Utah Navajo people in taking control over the entire section of the Aneth Oil Revenues. It presents a significant problem with a line of issues both Filfred and Kenneth Maryboy are up against.

=== Senate Bill 1690 ===
The first hearing was on Senate Bill 1690 , which would transfer trustee authority and resources for the Utah Navajo Trust Fund from the state of Utah to the Utah Dineh Corporation. The second hearing is an oversight hearing to examine the chronic backlog of Indian land transaction decisions at the Interior Department. The backlog effectively blocks many tribes from using their lands, often for years, until those decisions are made.

Locally, the biggest issue is an emotional tussle over a trust fund that holds royalties from oil and gas leases in and around Aneth. That fund's assets doubled to more than $52 million this year when Utah agreed to settle a lawsuit over alleged abuses during the decades that the state oversaw it.

Utah gave up its oversight role two years ago, and no projects to benefit the Utah Navajos — many of whom have no electricity or running water — can be initiated until Congress picks a new trustee. The Navajo Nation, which receives 62.5 percent of the royalties, wants control of the whole fund.

On June 16, 2008, Kenneth Maryboy, Mark Maryboy, Davis Filfred, and Commissioner Phil Lyman of Blanding, Utah will travel to Washington, D.C. to present a working model of how an easy transition from the State of Utah handling Utah Navajo royalty money, to a functioning Utah Navajo organization before Congress.

Locally, the biggest issue is an emotional tussle over a trust fund that holds royalties from oil and gas leases in and around Aneth. That fund's assets doubled to more than $52 million this year when Utah agreed to settle a lawsuit over alleged abuses during the decades that the state oversaw it.

Utah gave up its oversight role two years ago, and no projects to benefit the Utah Navajos — many of whom have no electricity or running water — can be initiated until Congress picks a new trustee. The Navajo Nation, which receives 62.5 percent of the royalties, wants control of the whole fund.

Delegate Davis Filfred's position on the matter is that other Navajos resent the trust fund settlement, thinking it showered the Utah Navajos with cash when the royalties are actually being tied up.

"People think we have all the money, which we don't," said Filfred who is pushing for local control.

"The Navajo Nation does not know how to spend money," Filfred said. "It keeps spending money it doesn't have and digging further into the red."

Oil fund at center of Utah Navajo Nation Council election

== Navajo relationship with the State of Utah ==
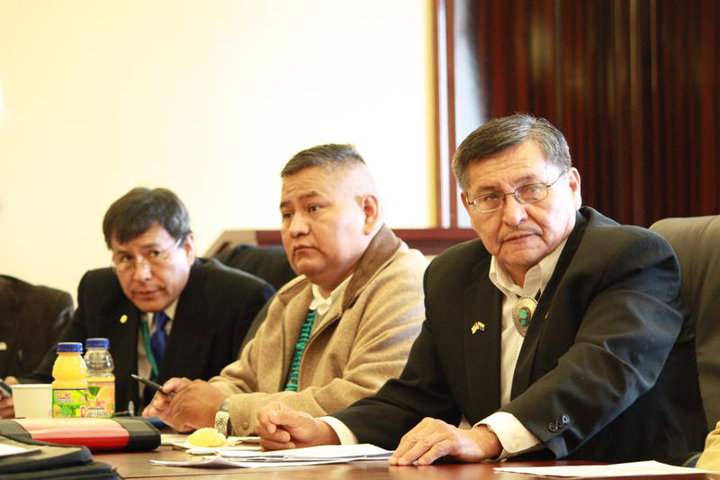
Navajo Delegates Kenneth Maryboy, Davis Filfred, & Vice President Ben Shelly attended the Indian Caucus Day @ the Utah State Capitol advocating for the Navajo constituents living in Utah.

On Jan. 27, 2009, A Navajo delegation attended Indian Caucus Day. Utah Navajo Delegates Maryboy and Davis Filfred attended the Indian Caucus Day at the Utah State Capitol to advocate on behalf of Navajo constituents living in the state of Utah.

Elected leaders from the Utah's five tribes met with former Utah State Gov. Jon M. Huntsman Jr., Gov. Gary R. Herbert, Attorney General Mark Shurtleff and a number of program directors to emphasize the importance of maintaining adequate funding for programs which provide direct services to tribal citizens.

Thestate of Utah announced major budgetary problems for the upcoming fiscal year and has proposed possible cuts of 15 percent for state agencies. At the caucus, tribal leaders urged Utah state leaders to recognize the limitation in state services currently available to Utah tribes and asked for specific programs to be maintained, despite the economic challenges faced by the state.

Bears Ears Davis Filfred

== United States Marine Corps Veteran ==
Davis Filfred w/Honor Guard hoisting federal and state colors on November 11, 2006 @ the Montezuma Creek Elementary School, Utah

As the Commander of the Southeastern Utah Diné Veterans Organization, Filfred has made himself available to local Veteran's Affairs events around the Four Corners area such as Flag ceremonies and welcoming home events for recently returning Military men and women from overseas combat deployments.

Recently, members of the Southeast Diné Veterans Organization, joined by the new superintendent of Mesa Verde National Park, Cliff Spencer, hoisted nine flags representing the two tribes of both Ute Mountain Tribal Members and Navajo Tribal Members, as well as the four states.

The 2010-2011 Miss Utah Navajo sang the national anthem in the Navajo language as well as Filfred hoisting the American Flag during a gathered at the Four Corners National Monument on November 11, 2010 (Veterans Day) to celebrate the completion of a million dollar plaza renovation.

== See also ==
- United States Marine Corps
- Literacy is Empowering Project
- Navajo Nation
- Montezuma Creek, Utah
- Aneth, Utah
- KTNN Radio
- Uranium mining in the United States
- Supreme Court of the Navajo Nation
- Navajo language
- Navajo music
- Navajo people
- Navajo Rug
- Southern Athabaskan languages
- Dinetah
