= Maryboy (surname) =

Maryboy is a surname. Notable people with the surname include:

- Kenneth Maryboy (born 1961), American politician
- Mark Maryboy (born 1955), American politician
- Nancy C. Maryboy (fl. 1995), Cherokee and Navajo astronomer and educator
