= Recapture Canyon =

Canyon in Utah, US

Coordinates: 37°35′N 109°25.5′W

Recapture Canyon is a canyon along Recapture Creek (a tributary of the San Juan River) east of Blanding, San Juan County, Utah, United States. It is an archaeological site, and is located on federal land. The Bureau of Land Management closed it to motorized vehicles in 2007 due to damage caused by illegal trail construction.

Recapture Canyon contains dwellings, burial sites, and artifacts of the Ancient Pueblo peoples, including cliff dwellings built between 1150 and 1300 AD.

On Saturday May 10, 2014, San Juan County Commissioner Phil Lyman organized a protest aimed at legally opening the trail to all-terrain vehicles. The protest attracted several militia members from the Bundy ranch. Bureau of Land Management undercover agents documented the illegal ride. Lyman was convicted of misdemeanor trespassing, for which he served ten days in jail and paid restitution of $96,000. On December 22, 2020 Lyman was pardoned by President Donald Trump.
