= 2024 Utah gubernatorial election =

- November 5, 2024
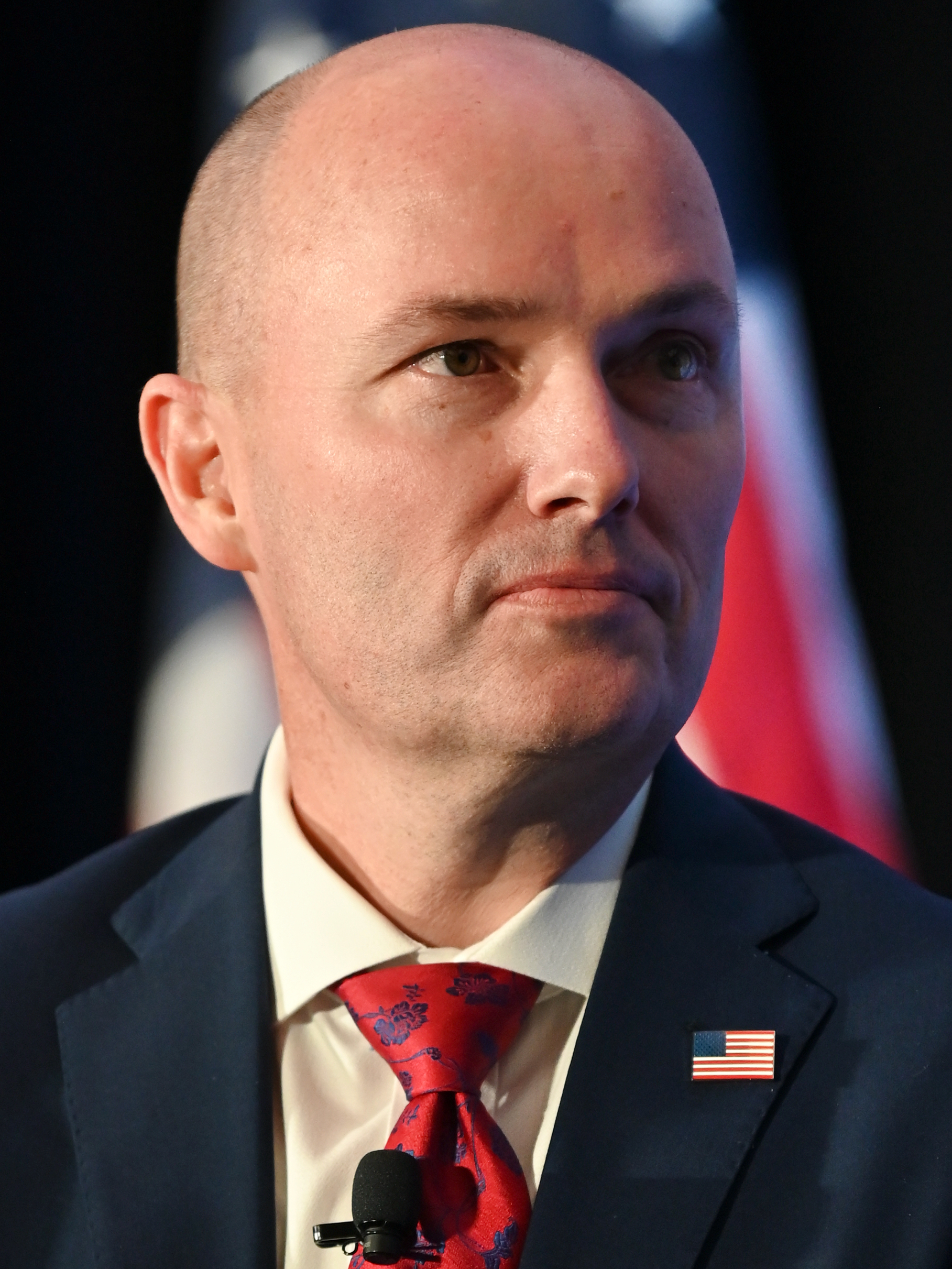

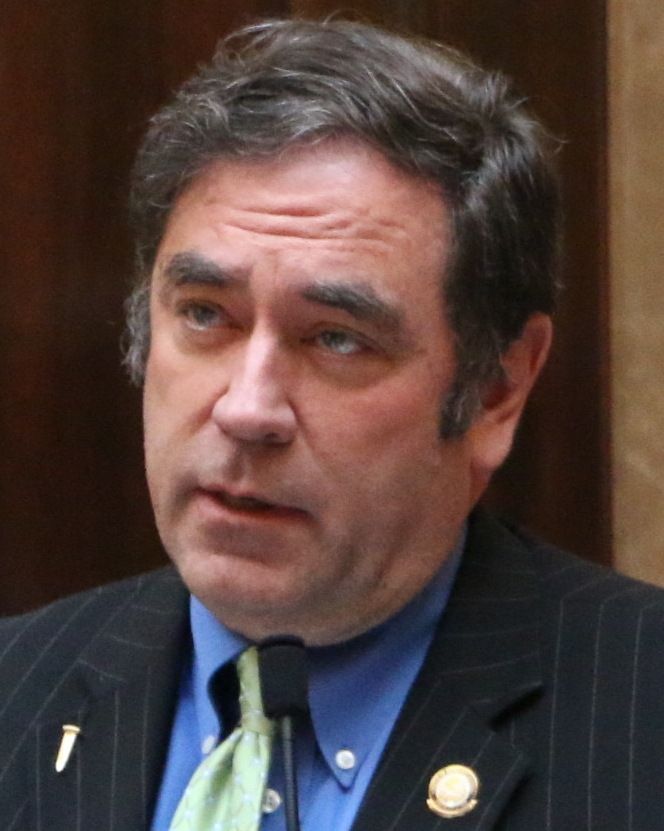

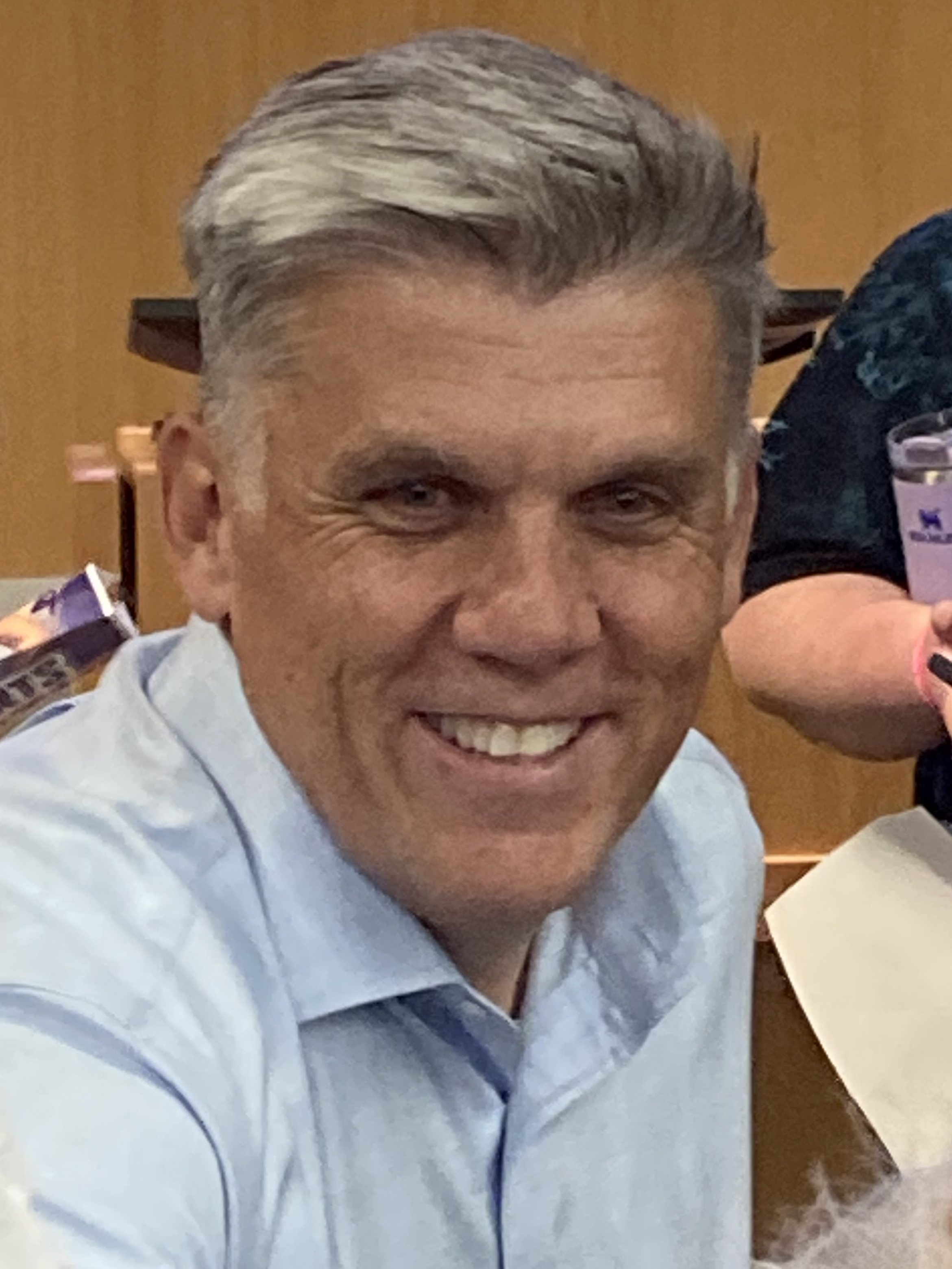
Nominee	Spencer Cox	Brian King	Phil Lyman (write-in)
Party	Republican	Democratic	Independent Republican
Running mate	Deidre Henderson	Rebekah Cummings	Natalie Clawson (write-in)
Popular vote	781,431	420,514	200,551
Percentage	52.89%	28.46%	13.57%
- Cox: 30–40% 40–50% 50–60% 60–70% 70–80% King: 40–50%
Governor before election
Spencer Cox
Republican
Elected Governor
Spencer Cox
Republican

The 2024 Utah gubernatorial election was held on November 5, 2024, to elect the governor of Utah.

Incumbent Governor Spencer Cox ran for a second term, winning the Republican primary against state representative Phil Lyman with 54.4% of the vote; Lyman later mounted a write-in campaign for the general election. Cox won the general election in November, defeating Democratic nominee and state representative Brian King as well as Lyman.

This was the worst performance for a Republican gubernatorial candidate since 1992, which also saw a major independent candidate. Cox's 24.43% margin of victory was also the smallest since 2004. Democrats have not won a gubernatorial election in Utah since 1980.

== Background ==
Utah is considered to be a strongly red state at the federal and state levels: Republicans control all statewide executive offices, the entire congressional delegation, and supermajorities in both state legislative chambers. In the 2020 presidential election, Donald Trump carried Utah by 20.5%.

Cox was first elected in 2020, defeating Christopher Peterson by 32.65%.

== Republican primary ==
Incumbent Republican governor Spencer Cox faced criticism from many conservatives for his moderate political positions, including his veto of HB11, and opposition to former president Donald Trump. Cox was booed at the Utah Republican state convention in April 2024. He faced a primary challenge from state representative Phil Lyman, who won over 67% of the vote at the convention. However, Cox collected enough signatures to appear on the primary ballot. Cox consistently led Lyman in polls and won re-nomination, though Lyman refused to concede.

=== Candidates ===
==== Nominee ====
- Spencer Cox, incumbent governor
  - Running mate: Deidre Henderson, incumbent lieutenant governor

==== Eliminated in primary ====
- Phil Lyman, state representative
  - Running mate: Natalie Clawson, attorney
  - Previous running mate: Layne Bangerter, former special assistant to the president

==== Eliminated at convention ====
- Sylvia Miera-Fisk, commercial pilot
- Carson Jorgensen, former chair of the Utah Republican Party (2021–2023) and candidate for Utah's 2nd congressional district in 2020
  - Running mate: Corrine Johnson, activist
- Scott Robbins, U.S. Marine Corps veteran

==== Declined ====
- Jason Chaffetz, former U.S. representative from Utah's 3rd congressional district (2009–2017)
- Robert O'Brien, former U.S. National Security Advisor (2019–2021)

=== Endorsements ===
Phil Lyman

Individuals

- Riley Gaines, competitive swimmer

Political parties

- Utah Republican Party

Organizations

- Eagle Forum

=== Fundraising ===
Campaign finance reports as of June 13, 2024
Candidate	Raised	Spent	Cash on hand
Spencer Cox (R)	$1,263,235	$2,142,975	$645,543
Phil Lyman (R)	$1,408,004	$1,051,850	$356,153
Source: State of Utah Financial Disclosures

=== Polling ===
Poll source	Date(s) administered	Sample size (Note: Key: A – all adults RV – registered voters LV – likely voters V – unclear)	Margin of error	Spencer Cox	Phil Lyman	Other	Undecided
Noble Predictive Insights	June 20–21, 2024	432 (LV)	± 4.7%	55%	42%	2% (Note: "Would not vote" with 2%)	1%
HarrisX (Note: Poll sponsored by the Deseret News and the University of Utah)	June 4–7, 2024	477 (RV)	± 4.5%	62%	25%	–	12%
Noble Predictive Insights	April 8–16, 2024	283 (RV)	± 5.8%	51%	4%	9% (Note: Scott Robbins with 4%; Sylvia Fisk with 3%; Carson Jorgenson with 2%)	36%
Dan Jones & Associates	January 16–21, 2024	428 (RV)	± 4.7%	50%	3%	11% (Note: Scott Robbins with 5%; Sylvia Fisk and Carson Jorgenson with 3%)	37%

=== Results ===
==== Convention ====
Republican convention results
Candidate/Running mate	Round 1		Round 2	
Candidate/Running mate	Votes	%	Votes	%
Phil Lyman/Layne Bangerter	1663	44.24%	2495	67.54%
Spencer Cox/Deidre Henderson	1085	28.86%	1199	32.46%
Carson Jorgensen/Corrine Johnson	970	25.80%	Eliminated	
Scott Robbins	21	0.56%	Eliminated	
Sylvia Miera-Fisk	20	0.53%	Eliminated	
Inactive Ballots	2 ballots		4 ballots	

==== Debate ====
2024 Utah gubernatorial election Republican primary debate
No.	Date	Host	Moderator	Link	Republican	Republican
P Participant A Absent N Not invited I Invited W Withdrawn						
P Participant A Absent N Not invited I Invited W Withdrawn					Cox	Lyman
1	Jun. 11, 2024	Utah Debate Commission	Carolina Ballard	YouTube	P	P

==== Primary ====
Primary results by county: Cox: 50–60%; 60–70%; Lyman: 50–60%; 70–80%

Republican primary results
Party	Candidate	Votes	%
Republican	Spencer Cox (incumbent) Deidre Henderson (incumbent)	232,164	54.40%
Republican	Phil Lyman Natalie Clawson	194,639	45.60%
Total votes		426,803	100.00%

=== Aftermath ===
Lyman later sued, claiming that the Republican convention was responsible for selecting the party's nominee and that the primary was illegal. The Utah Supreme Court rejected his argument. Lyman later announced that he would run as a write-in candidate.

Cox has since backed Trump after an assassination attempt made during a rally in Pennsylvania on July 13, stating in a letter: "Your life was spared. Now, because of that miracle, you have the opportunity to do something that no other person on earth can do right now: unify and save our country." Cox also stated in a later news conference: “I am doing everything I can to help and support him...We will still have lots of disagreements, I’m sure, and we’ll still do everything we can to help the state of Utah and help the Republican Party be successful.”

== Democratic primary ==
=== Candidates ===
==== Nominee ====
- Brian King, state representative from the 23rd district (2009–present) and former Minority Leader of the Utah House of Representatives (2015–2023)
  - Running mate: Rebekah Cummings, director of digital matters at the University of Utah

=== Endorsements ===
Brian King

Political parties

- Utah Democratic Party

== Libertarian Party ==
=== Candidates ===
==== Nominee ====
- J. Robert Latham, attorney, nominee for lieutenant governor in 2012, and nominee for Utah's 2nd congressional district in 2020
  - Running mate: Barry Short, businessman, perennial candidate, and nominee for lieutenant governor in 2016 and 2020

== Independent American Party ==
=== Candidates ===
==== Nominee ====
- Tommy Williams, perennial candidate and nominee for U.S. Senate in 2022
  - Running mate: Archie Williams, heavy equipment operator and perennial candidate

== Independents ==
=== Candidates ===
==== Declared ====
- Tom Tomeny, businessman
  - Running mate: William Lansing Taylor, geologist

== Other candidates ==
=== Republican write-in ===
- Phil Lyman, state representative
  - Running mate: Natalie Clawson

== General election ==
=== Debates ===
2024 Utah gubernatorial election debates
No.	Date	Host	Moderator	Link	Republican	Democratic	Libertarian	Write-in
P Participant A Absent N Not invited I Invited W Withdrawn								
P Participant A Absent N Not invited I Invited W Withdrawn					Cox	King	Latham	Lyman
1	Sep. 11, 2024	Utah Debate Commission	Jason Perry	YouTube	P	P	P	N

=== Predictions ===
Source	Ranking	As of
The Cook Political Report	Solid R	July 13, 2024
Inside Elections	Solid R	July 14, 2023
Sabato's Crystal Ball	Safe R	June 4, 2024
RCP	Solid R	July 13, 2024
Elections Daily	Safe R	July 12, 2023
CNalysis	Solid R	August 17, 2024

=== Fundraising ===
Campaign finance reports as of October 14, 2024
Candidate	Raised	Spent	Cash on hand
Spencer Cox (R)	$2,415,468	$3,782,382	$158,370
Brian King (D)	$632,080	$651,962	$24,436
Source: State of Utah Financial Disclosures

=== Polling ===
Poll source	Date(s) administered	Sample size	Margin of error	Spencer Cox (R)	Brian King (D)	Robert Latham (L)	Tommy Williams (I)	Other	Undecided
Noble Predictive Insights	October 25–28, 2024	695 (LV)	± 3.7%	43%	26%	3%	3%	18% (Note: Lyman (Write-in) with 15%; "Refused" with 3%)	6%
HarrisX	October 15–19, 2024	813 (RV)	± 3.4%	51%	19%	3%	4%	2% (Note: Tomeny (I) with 2%)	22%
HarrisX	October 15–19, 2024	813 (RV)	± 3.4%	61%	21%	4%	7%	6% (Note: Tomeny (I) with 6%)	–
Noble Predictive Insights	October 2–7, 2024	539 (LV)	± 4.22%	54%	26%	–	–	–	20%
Noble Predictive Insights	October 2–7, 2024	539 (LV)	± 4.22%	49%	23%	2%	2%	5% (Note: Lyman (Write-in) with 5%)	19%
Noble Predictive Insights	October 2–7, 2024	600 (RV)	± 4.0%	52%	26%	–	–	–	21%
Public Policy Polling (D) (Note: Poll sponsored by Brian King's campaign)	September 27–28, 2024	612 (LV)	± 4.0%	45%	32%	–	–	–	23%
Public Policy Polling (D)	September 27–28, 2024	612 (LV)	± 4.0%	35%	24%	3%	–	19% (Note: Lyman (Write-In) with 19%)	18%
Lighthouse Research (Note: Poll sponsored by the Utah Debate Commission.)	August 29 – September 4, 2024	518 (RV)	± 4.31%	48%	27%	7%	4%	8% (Note: Tomeny (I) with 2%)	5%
HarrisX	August 2–9, 2024	800 (RV)	± 3.5%	56%	17%	4%	6%	–	17%
HarrisX	August 2–9, 2024	800 (RV)	± 3.5%	59%	19%	–	–	–	22%

=== Results ===
2024 Utah gubernatorial election
Party	Candidate	Votes	%	±%
Republican	Spencer Cox (incumbent); Deidre Henderson (incumbent)	781,431	52.89%	−10.09
Democratic	Brian King; Rebekah Cummings	420,514	28.46%	−1.89
Write-In	Phil Lyman; Natalie Clawson	200,551	13.57%	N/A
Libertarian	J. Robert Latham; Barry Evan Short	41,164	2.79%	−0.73
Independent American	Tommy Williams; Archie Williams	27,480	1.86%	+0.09
Independent	Tom Tomeny; William Lansing Taylor	5,792	0.39%	N/A
Write-In	Charlie Tautuaa; Sylvia Miera Fisk	525	0.04%	N/A
Total votes		1,477,457	100.00%	N/A
Republican hold				

==== By county ====
Cox won 27 of 29 counties, with King winning the other two.

County	Spencer Cox Republican		Brian King Democratic		Phil Lyman Republican (write-in)		Various candidates Other parties		Margin		Total
County	#	%	#	%	#	%	#	%	#	%	Total
Beaver	2,120	67.75%	251	8.02%	592	18.92%	166	5.31%	1,528	48.83% (Note: Compares margin over Lyman.)	3,129
Box Elder	18,423	64.30%	3,535	12.34%	4,682	16.34%	2,012	7.02%	13,741	47.96%	28,652
Cache	36,185	60.27%	13,061	21.76%	7,483	12.46%	3,306	5.51%	23,124	38.52%	60,035
Carbon	5,710	61.31%	2,094	22.48%	1,006	10.80%	503	5.40%	3,616	38.83%	9,313
Daggett	391	72.81%	72	13.41%	52	9.68%	22	4.10%	319	59.40%	537
Davis	95,679	57.63%	40,181	24.20%	20,103	12.11%	10,057	6.06%	55,498	33.43%	166,020
Duchesne	5,721	65.24%	728	8.30%	1,664	18.98%	656	7.48%	4,057	46.27%	8,769
Emery	3,256	66.04%	469	9.51%	955	19.37%	250	5.07%	2,301	46.67%	4,930
Garfield	1,914	69.47%	393	14.26%	344	12.49%	104	3.77%	1,521	55.21%	2,755
Grand	2,186	43.67%	2,433	48.60%	170	3.40%	217	4.33%	-247	-4.93%	5,006
Iron	16,814	61.50%	3,967	14.51%	4,775	17.46%	1,785	6.53%	12,039	44.03%	27,341
Juab	3,821	59.78%	491	7.68%	1,697	26.55%	383	5.99%	2,124	33.23%	6,392
Kane	2,628	59.93%	859	19.59%	717	16.35%	181	4.13%	1,769	40.34%	4,385
Millard	3,708	58.80%	499	7.91%	1,706	27.05%	393	6.23%	2,002	31.75%	6,306
Morgan	4,293	63.10%	772	11.35%	1,373	20.18%	365	5.37%	2,920	42.92%	6,803
Piute	718	76.06%	53	5.61%	147	15.57%	26	2.75%	571	60.49%	944
Rich	1,088	76.24%	132	9.25%	136	9.53%	71	4.98%	952	66.71%	1,427
Salt Lake	222,608	44.07%	220,368	43.63%	40,035	7.93%	22,057	4.37%	2,240	0.44%	505,068
San Juan	2,241	35.94%	1,994	31.98%	1,715	27.51%	285	4.57%	247	3.96%	6,235
Sanpete	8,052	62.80%	1,240	9.67%	2,767	21.58%	762	5.94%	5,285	41.22%	12,821
Sevier	7,341	68.06%	777	7.20%	2,162	20.04%	506	4.69%	5,179	48.02%	10,786
Summit	11,202	43.94%	11,435	44.86%	1,952	7.66%	902	3.54%	-233	-0.91%	25,491
Tooele	19,827	59.17%	7,104	21.20%	4,079	12.17%	2,497	7.45%	12,723	37.97%	33,507
Uintah	10,208	65.88%	1,428	9.22%	2,610	16.84%	1,249	8.06%	7,598	49.04%	15,495
Utah	171,100	57.25%	54,536	18.25%	59,531	19.92%	13,693	4.58%	111,569	37.33%	298,860
Wasatch	10,043	54.87%	4,574	24.99%	2,993	16.35%	693	3.79%	5,469	29.88%	18,303
Washington	53,786	56.08%	15,977	16.66%	21,025	21.92%	5,122	5.34%	32,761	34.16%	95,910
Wayne	925	57.13%	287	17.73%	354	21.87%	53	3.27%	571	35.27%	1,619
Weber	59,443	53.74%	30,804	27.85%	13,726	12.41%	6,645	6.01%	28,639	25.89%	110,618
Totals	781,431	52.89%	420,514	28.46%	200,551	13.57%	74,961	5.07%	360,917	24.43%	1,477,457

==== By congressional district ====
Cox won all four congressional districts.

District	Cox	King	Representative
1st	54%	29%	Blake Moore
2nd	51%	31%	Celeste Maloy
3rd	53%	28%	John Curtis (118th Congress)
3rd	53%	28%	Mike Kennedy (119th Congress)
4th	54%	26%	Burgess Owens

== Notes ==
Partisan clients
