= Kenneth Maryboy =

Navajo politician

Navajo Nation Council Delegate
- In office January 22, 2001 – January 10, 2011
- President: Joe Shirley Jr.
- Preceded by: David L. John

Commissioner Dist. 3 of San Juan County
- In office January 2, 2007 – January 1, 2011
- Preceded by: Manuel Morgan

Personal details
- Born: May 13, 1961 (age 65)
- Party: Democratic
- Spouse: Cherly J. Maryboy
- Occupation: Radio (Sports, Basketball)

Kenneth Maryboy (born May 13, 1961) is a Navajo politician for San Juan County, Utah, and was Navajo Nation Council Delegate. Maryboy is a former San Juan County Commissioner. Maryboy was the third Democrat in a row to have been elected to the Commissioner District 3 position since District 3's inception in 1984. Kenneth was replaced on the commission in 2015 by Rebecca M. Benally.

Kenneth Maryboy is the brother of Mark Maryboy who served the Navajo Nation Council Delegates for 16 years and also served as the San Juan County Commissioner for four terms. Kenneth also shares the same Navajo Nation council representation as Davis Filfred, in the Utah Section of the reservation.

He also works alongside Rebecca M. Benally, the San Juan School Board for the Utah Navajo student curriculum, and Bruce Adams for the San Juan County affairs.

Maryboy was once again reelected during the 2010 National Midterm and Navajo Nation Elections in the positions of San Juan County Commissioner District 3 and as a Council Delegate in the newly reduced 24 member Navajo Nation Tribal Council, respectively.

== Early life ==
At age 18, Mayboy lived with his mother and younger brother on a reservation near Bluff, Utah. They were barely making ends meet on his meager wages as a welder. Although times were rather harsh, Kenneth managed to improve his skills at welding and as an electrician.

Later in life, Maryboy, known as a "Medicine Man" among people living on land encompassing the Four-Corners Region of the United States, ministered to the physical, mental and spiritual needs of his people. Maryboy bridged the gap between the old ways of the Navajo, and the current life in America.

During Rodeo seasons he would be asked to announce for many different events and venues.

=== KTNN radio announcer ===
In April 1993, KTNN 660 AM, a Navajo Language AM radio station, broadcasting from Window Rock, Arizona, began commentaries for the NBA team, the Phoenix Suns.

Maryboy, along with the KTNN Sports Director, L.A. Williams did the play-by-play for their first Suns game. This was a first amongst Navajo Broadcasting stations to be affiliated with a Major League Basketball team.

=== Navajo Santa ===
Invoking his own happy childhood memories of the celebration of Christmas at St. Christopher's Mission, Maryboy created a program, the Navajo Santa, to help serve his people with the spirit of Christmas all year long. He adapted the concept of Santa Claus to meet the needs of the Native Americans who are among the most impoverished people in the U.S. The program provides gifts of food, clothing, blankets, and toys, medical care, and other services.

December 2007 Navajo Santa Event

_{"I would like to see that the understanding and the caring will continue on—that people will understand togetherness and what caring means to other people I still envision a lot more things that I might be able to do, not only in the Navajo Nation but maybe in a broader area as well where there is need."}

A non-profit organization, Navajo Santa was created to bring food, blankets, warm clothing, toys, and other necessities to Navajos in need on the reservation in southeastern Utah. Entirely volunteer supported, Navajo Santa provides an exchange of culture and support between Navajos and non-Navajos.

His solo Christmas Eve visits have grown into an annual Navajo feast with gifts of clothing, tools and toys for over 700 people. Kids who can't make it to the event because they're sick or lack transportation get a personal visit from Kenneth or one of his elves.

"My grandfather taught me that you learn to be a man and a warrior by sharing and by keeping promises," he says.

=== Caring Institute Award ===
On November 18, 2002, Kenneth went to Washington, D.C., to receive the Caring Institute Award, an honor previously given to Mother Teresa, President Jimmy Carter and Rosalynn Carter, and Paul Newman. Other winners include former Senator Bob Dole and Reverend Billy Graham.

== Navajo Nation Council Delegate ==
Council Delegate Maryboy informing his supports of former Navajo Chairman Peter MacDonald's endorsement of his reelection campaign

In 2000, Maryboy was elected into the legislative body of Navajo Nation Government as a Navajo Nation Council Delegate for the Mexican Water, Aneth and Red Mesa Chapters. These areas expand the Arizonan and Utahn borders with a constituency of nearly 10,000 people.

Upon election, Kenneth positioned himself in the Navajo Economic Development committee where he serves as the Vice Chair for the Navajo Nation Nation Council.

=== Navajo Nation Council reduction ===
On Dec. 15, 2009, Tribal members voted to reduce the Navajo Tribal Council from 88 to 24 members, and the Navajo Nation Supreme Court ordered immediate implementation of the redistricting in a May 28, 2010 decision. With this Navajo Nation-wide action, it resulting in pitting Councilman Maryboy against fellow Councilman, Davis Filfred during the November 2, 2010 General Elections.

Councilman Maryboy defeated Councilman Filfred for a newly redistricted "Shiprock Agency" section on the Navajo Reservation.

=== 2010 Navajo Election results ===
Kenneth Maryboy WINNER

Total Votes by Chapter - 1,114

039 - Aneth Chapter 251

028 - Mexican Water Chapter 173

099 - Red Mesa Chapter 280

031 - TeecNosPos Chapter 230

030 - Sweet Water Chapter 180

Davis Filfred

Total Votes by Chapter - 1,053

039 - Aneth Chapter 347

028 - Mexican Water Chapter 149

099 - Red Mesa Chapter 261

031 - TeecNosPos Chapter 116

030 - Sweet Water Chapter 180

(Write-in) "Francis Redhouse"

Total Votes by Chapter - 593

039 - Aneth Chapter 151

028 - Mexican Water Chapter 33

099 - Red Mesa Chapter 84

031 - TeecNosPos Chapter 222

030 - Sweet Water Chapter 103

2010 Investigation into Navajo Nation Lawmakers Discretionary Funds

In October 2010, Navajo tribal officials, were charged in an investigation of slush funds just weeks before the November election. Not Guilty was what was pleaded for the Councilmen charged for fraud, conspiracy and theft.

Washington D.C.-based Special prosecutor Alan Balaran reported results on the investigation in which he filed criminal complaints against current Vice President/President-Elect, Ben Shelly, and at least 77 members of the 88-delegate Council as part of a sweeping investigation into the use of discretionary funds that Davis Filfred and Maryboy were named in as well.

== 2014 Navajo Presidential Campaign ==
Kenneth Maryboy was one of Seventeen Candidates Campaigning for Navajo Nation President, He lost the Primary against Chris Deschnee and Joe Shirley JR., placing fifth with 3,738 Votes.

== San Juan County Commissioner ==
Commissioner Kenneth Maryboy (2010)

In November 2006, Kenneth Maryboy was elected as the San Juan County Commissionership for District 3. The commissionership delegates handle county issues in Monticello, Utah. The San Juan County Commissioner seat is a three person council which oversee's the needs and issues for San Juan County's residents.

Commissioner Maryboy won a bid to the Commissionership nomination after an extensive primary battle between himself and Andrew Tso of Montezuma Creek, Utah during the 2010 San Juan County Primaries.

=== 2010 Primary Election results ===
San Juan County, Utah

County Commission Dist #3

Kenneth Maryboy DEM

Bluff 85

Montezuma Creek 97

Aneth 69

Mexican Hat 47

Red Mesa 43

Early Voting 1

Canvass 6

TOTAL 348

Andrew Tso DEM

Bluff 21

Montezuma Creek 45

Aneth 77

Mexican Hat 3

Red Mesa 23

Early Voting 4

Canvass 4

TOTAL 177

Commissioner Maryboy shortly after taking the Oath for Commissioner

=== San Juan County 2010 General Election ===
After successfully defeating Andrew Tso, Maryboy went on to be reelected to his particular county office, unopposed, in the 2010 San Juan County General election.

== Commissionership issues ==
=== Conflicting dual-elected positions issues ===
After being elected as the San Juan County Commissioner and as the Navajo Nation Council Delegate, questions arose as to the legitimacy and ethics as an elected official of both seats. Members elected to positions on two governments bodies was a hot button issue.

Following the October 16, 2007 Navajo Nation Council vote, granting delegates to maintain service as Councilmen & County Representatives, Maryboy to was allowed to maintain his positions as both the San Juan County Commissioner and Navajo Nation Council Delegate for the Aneth, Red Mesa, and Mexican Water Chapters

=== The Navajo voice of San Juan ===
Kenneth Maryboy has to balance his role as a Navajo leader with duties as a San Juan County commissioner, taking office in January. His brother, Mark Maryboy, made history when he was elected in 1986 as the first American Indian county commissioner, also in San Juan, in Utah's history. The county has had one Navajo county commissioner ever since.

"More than 55 percent of registered voters in San Juan County are Native Americans, and they need to be represented, which is something that maybe Anglo commissioners had not had that perspective before." - Bruce Adams (San Juan Commissioner Dist. 1)

== Utah Navajo issues ==
Utah Navajo Strip: located in Southeast Utah

Historically, Utah Navajos were ignored not only by the county and state governments but also by the Navajo Nation.

Located in the Four-Corners regions of the United States, the narrow Utah strip that is home to 8,000 of the Navajo Nation's 300,000 citizens. San Juan County officials long believed Utah Navajos were primarily the responsibility of the tribe. The Council, on the other hand, held that their Utah kin could fend for themselves after a 1933 federal mandate awarded them 37.5 percent of royalties from the rich oil fields near Aneth on Utah's portion of the reservation.

=== Utah Navajo Trust Fund ===
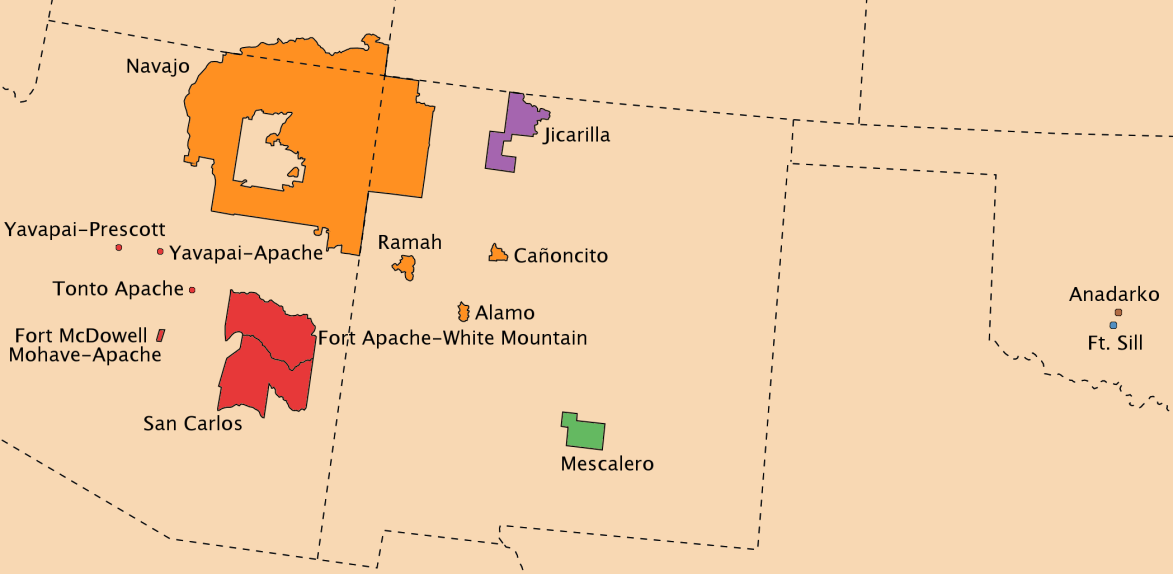
Utah Navajo: Northernmost section of the Navajo Nation (in Orange)

But between 1933 and 1990, the Utah Navajo Oil Trust Fund was plundered of $150 million, according to a Utah legislative auditor's report. The Navajos' lawsuit against the state is still pending. The State of Utah is the only state in the Nation administering a trust fund for the benefit of American Indians whose lands are within state boundaries. The Utah Navajos have sought to have a more active role in the distribution of the royalties and this would present that opportunity. Legislative leadership has committed to provide a way to make the transition process as seamless as possible for the beneficiaries.

Trust Fund to Sunset

Currently since, Utah's Navajo Trust Fund statute is set to sunset in 2008. Utah Governor Jon Huntsman and Legislative Leadership in 2007 have joined together in asking Congress to create a new disbursement system for the royalties. The Utah Legislative leadership are now actively working with the Utah Navajo Element in regards to controlling of these royalties.

Utah Senate Minority Leader Mike Dmitrich saying Our congressional delegation must create a vehicle to distribute these monies in a way that all of the Chapter Houses have input.

Kenneth Maryboy and Davis Filfred have been active in the Utah Navajo Trust fund as well as helping the transition between Utah's Primary role in control the Utah Navajo Trust to the Utah Navajos themselves.

=== Lack of Navajo Nation infrastructure on Utah Navajo land ===
According to Kenneth's he feels his position and mission for his constituents are to help bring basic services to the people in his district. In fact, the Navajo Nation services which are not on the Utah side of the reservation include:

• Navajo Division of Public Safety Locations: 30 in Arizona, 13 in New Mexico

• Emergency Medical Services: 9 in Arizona, 4 in New Mexico

• Fire and Rescue Services: 6 in Arizona

• Criminal Investigation Section: 5 in Arizona, 2 in New Mexico

• Corrections: 4 in Arizona, 3 in New Mexico

• Victim Assistance: 2 in Arizona, 2 in New Mexico

• Police Districts: 4 in Arizona, 2 in New Mexico

• Office of Chief Prosecutors: 3 in Arizona, 4 in New Mexico

No Navajo Nation Health, Education and Welfare offices are in Utah: • Division of Health: 22 in Arizona, 11 in New Mexico

• Navajo Area Agency on Aging: 4 in Arizona, 2 in New Mexico

• Behavioral Health Services: 4 in Arizona, 2 in New Mexico

• Communicable Disease Program: 5 in Arizona, 2 in New Mexico

• Food Distribution Program: 5 in Arizona, 3 in New Mexico

• WIC Program: 4 in Arizona, 2 in New Mexico

• Division of Dine Education: 17 in Arizona, 8 in New Mexico

• Office of Dine Youth: 4 in Arizona, 2 in New Mexico,

• Dept. of Head Start: 4 in Arizona, 2 in New Mexico

• Office of Special Education/Rehabilitation: 5 in Arizona, 2 in New Mexico

• Office of Scholarship/Financial Assistance: 4 in Arizona, 2 in New Mexico

• Division of Social Services: 12 in Arizona, 9 in New Mexico

• Regional Offices: 5 in Arizona, 3 in New Mexico

• Sub Offices: 7 in Arizona, 6 in New Mexico

=== Utah Navajo oil revenues ===
Recently Counsel Delegates Kenneth Maryboy, Davis Filfred, and Former Counsel Delegate Mark Maryboy have been actively working to ensure that the Aneth Oil Royalties stay with the Utah Navajo people.

However such causes are not without competition, the Navajo Nation itself has been working counter to the Utah Navajo people in taking over the Aneth Oil Revenues. It presents a significant problem with a line of issues Kenneth is up against.

On June 16, 2008, Kenneth Maryboy, Mark Maryboy, Davis Filfred, and the honorable Phil Lyman of Blanding, Utah will travel to Washington, D.C. to present a working model of how an easy transition from the State of Utah handling Utah Navajo royalty money, to a functioning Utah Navajo organization before Congress.

Also, December 8, 2009, The U.S. Senate Indian Affairs Committee conducted two hearings that Wednesday morning. The back-to-back hearings which took place in Room 628 Dirksen Senate Office Building, in Washington, D.C.

=== Senate Bill 1690 ===
The first hearing was on Senate Bill 1690 , which would transfer trustee authority and resources for the Utah Navajo Trust Fund from the state of Utah to the Utah Dineh Corporation Inc. The second hearing is an oversight hearing to examine the chronic backlog of Indian land transaction decisions at the Interior Department. The backlog effectively blocks many tribes from using their lands, often for years, until those decisions are made.

Locally, the biggest issue is an emotional tussle over a trust fund that holds royalties from oil and gas leases in and around Aneth. That fund's assets doubled to more than $52 million this year when Utah agreed to settle a lawsuit over alleged abuses during the decades that the state oversaw it.

Utah gave up its oversight role two years ago, and no projects to benefit the Utah Navajos — many of whom have no electricity or running water — can be initiated until Congress picks a new trustee. The Navajo Nation, which receives 62.5 percent of the royalties, wants control of the whole fund.

"Hell no," says Kenneth Maryboy, one of the council candidates and a San Juan County commissioner. "Keep the money in Utah." Oil fund at center of Utah Navajo Nation Council election

=== Navajo relationship with the State of Utah ===
Navajo Nation Delegation to Utah State Legislature

On Jan. 27, 2009, a Navajo delegation attended Indian Caucus Day. Utah Navajo Delegates Maryboy and Davis Filfred attended the Indian Caucus Day at the Utah State Capitol to advocate on behalf of Navajo constituents living in the state of Utah.

Elected leaders from the Utah's five tribes met with former Utah State Gov. Jon M. Huntsman Jr., Gov. Gary R. Herbert, Attorney General Mark Shurtleff and a number of program directors to emphasize the importance of maintaining adequate funding for programs which provide direct services to tribal citizens.

Thestate of Utah announced major budgetary problems for the upcoming fiscal year and has proposed possible cuts of 15 percent for state agencies. At the caucus, tribal leaders urged Utah state leaders to recognize the limitation in state services currently available to Utah tribes and asked for specific programs to be maintained, despite the economic challenges faced by the state.

Kenneth Maryboy went on to state, "With proposed budgetary cuts, it is important as tribal leaders that we are clear about what state programs we believe are most important to retain. It is also pertinent we are clear about what our goals are in terms of strengthening state and tribal relations."

== Life away from politics ==
Currently, although politics does take up much of Kenneth's time, he has found hobbies and activities to help balance out the public service life. With his family collectively joining him, Kenneth spends time with ATVs and hunting as a side passion. The Maryboy family is quite closely involved with many outdoor racing venues such as mudbogging and drag racing. In fact the Maryboy family runs a racing club called Whiterock Racing.
