= Swallow's Nest (Blanding, Utah) =

- U.S. National Register of Historic Places
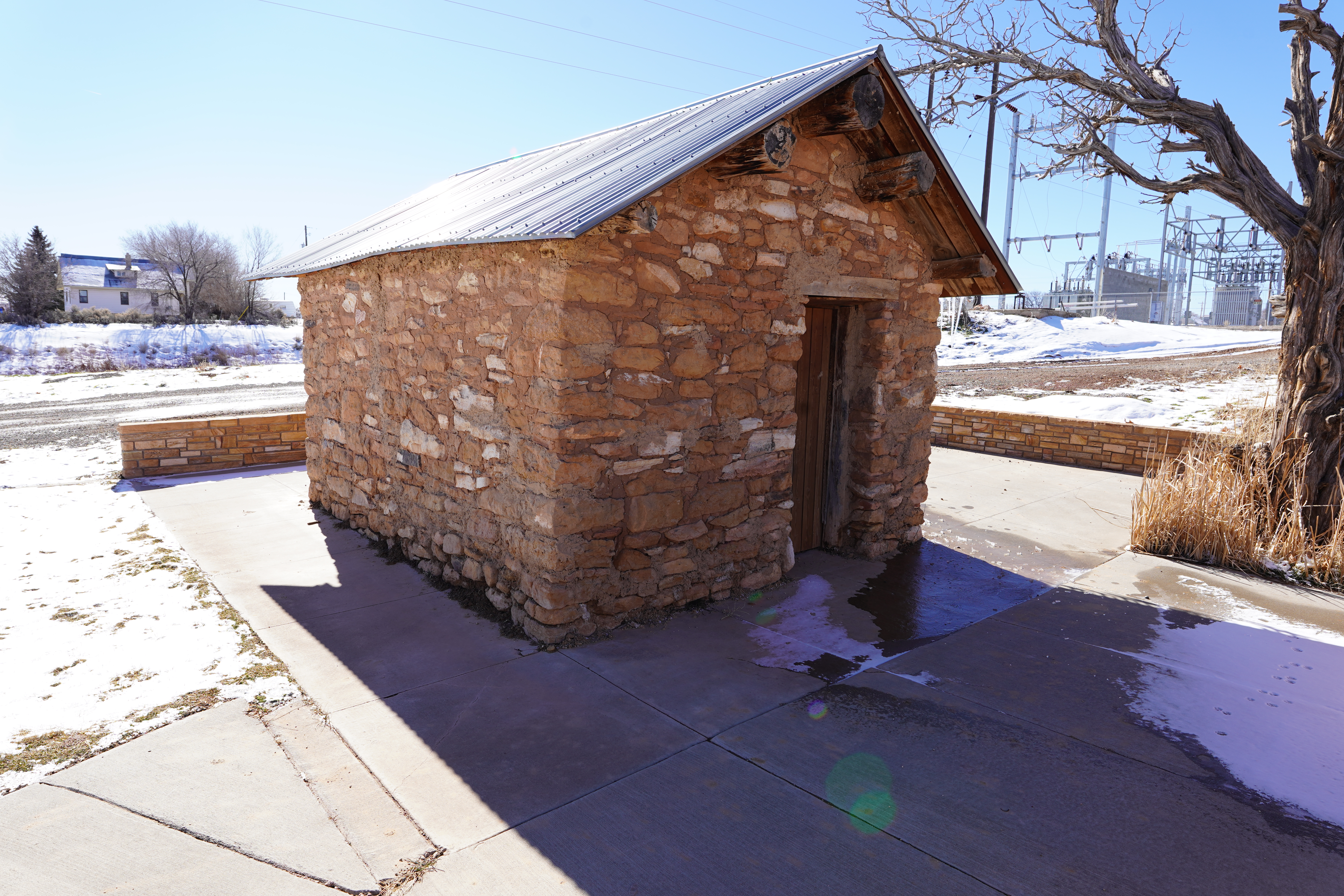

- Location within Utah Location within the United States
- Location: 2 N. Grayson Pkwy., Blanding, Utah
- Coordinates: 37°37′30″N 109°28′18″W
- Built: 1925
- Architect: Lyman, Albert Robison
- NRHP reference No.: 96000164
- Added to NRHP: February 23, 1996

The Swallow's Nest, also known as the Albert Robison Lyman Study, is a small sandstone building in Blanding, Utah. It was built in 1925 by Albert Robison Lyman as a retreat for writing. Lyman used the study until 1938 as a place for contemplation, where he could write in silence without inhibiting the activities of his family in the main house.

== Description ==
The Swallow's Nest is located on the Nicklovis Ranch, named by Albert R. Lyman for its former owner, Nicholas Lovis. The retreat was built about 350 feet (110 m) from the main ranch house, which was itself built about 1914.

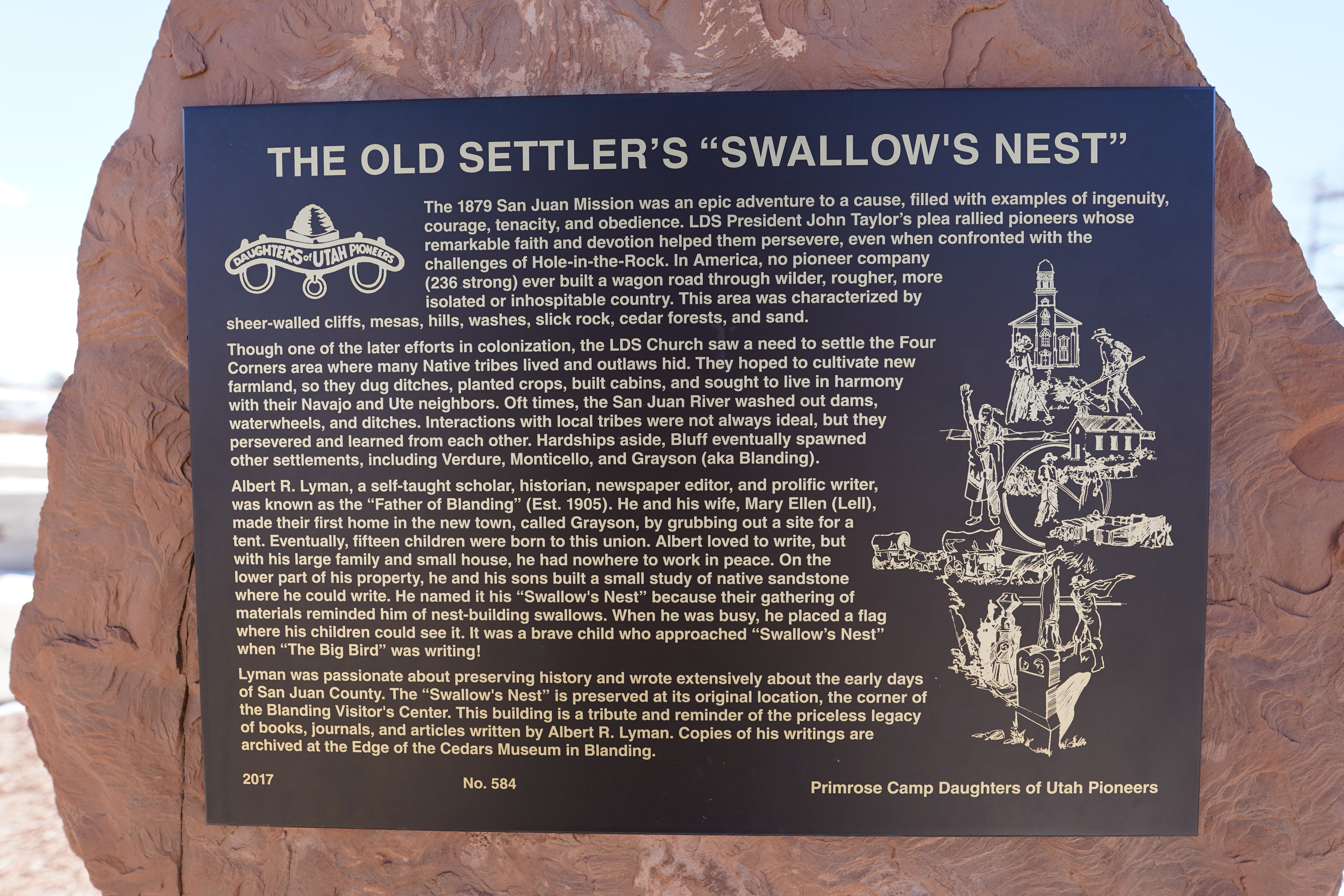
Swallow's Nest plaque

The one room building is built in random rubble sandstone obtained locally. The low gable roof is supported by log purlins on log columns. The door is on the north side, with single windows on the south and west sides. The interior has a rough wood floor and is finished with lime-washed mud plaster on the walls. A masonry firebox is located in the southwest corner, which may have served a wood stove. A rough built-in writing desk with bookshelves is located in the southeast corner.

== Albert Lyman ==
Albert Robison Lyman, his wife Mary Ellen ("Lell") and daughter Casse were the first settlers of Blanding in 1905. Born in Fillmore, Utah in 1880, Lyman's family settled in Bluff in 1880 as part of a party of Mormon settlers sent to colonize the San Juan River region of southeast Utah. The Lymans bought the Nicklovis ranch in 1912 for $770. Albert and Lell had fifteen children; six sons and nine daughters, leading to an understandable need on the part of Albert for a quiet place to pursue his writing. The cabin was designed with a metal flag that could be raised when Albert did not wish to be disturbed. Albert wrote and published "The Voice of the Intangible" during the 1925-1938 period. In 1938 the Lymans sold the property to Ray and Elizabeth Young and moved to Salt Lake City to try to preserve Lell's failing health. After Lell's death in 1939, Albert married her sister at Lell's insistence and Albert and Gladys moved back to Blanding in 1942, where Albert continued to write about the San Juan region from their house in Blanding.

The ranch property that included the Swallow's Nest changed hands several times, finally being acquired by the town of Blanding for a park. The cabin is now part of the town visitor center property.

Through many years of neglect the west side of the Swallow's Nest was caved in. In 1988 when the house was owned by Segal Realty, the family that lived on the land rebuilt the west wall and helped restore the Swallow's Nest to a usable state.
