= DeVan L. Shumway =

American publisher

DeVan L. "Van" Shumway (22 September 1930 – 23 April 2008) was an American publisher and aide to President Richard M. Nixon. He served as spokesperson for Nixon's Committee to Re-Elect the President and was a staunch defender of Nixon through the Watergate scandal.

== Life and career ==
Shumway was a native of Blanding, Utah. He attended the University of Utah and served in the United States Marine Corps during the Korean War. He then took a position at United Press International. Following his work on the unsuccessful re-election campaign of George Murphy, he went to work for Nixon, becoming the director of public relations on Nixon's re-election committee in 1972. He was one of three original recipients of Nixon's "enemies list" memo.

Shumway worked as a newspaper editor from 1973 to 1974, then directed public information for the Commodity Futures Trading Commission starting in 1975. In 1978 Shumway took a position as publisher of trade publication The Oil Daily. Following its sale, he later published Utility Spotlight before retiring in 2000.

Shumway died of lung disease at Johns Hopkins Hospital in Baltimore, Maryland.
