= KBDX =

- Blanding, Utah; United States
- Broadcast area: Monticello, Utah
- Frequency: 92.7 MHz
- Branding: Red Rock 92

Programming
- Format: Classic hits
- Affiliations: AP News

Ownership
- Owner: William Boyle; (San Juan Record Inc)

History
- First air date: 2001

Technical information
- Licensing authority: FCC
- Facility ID: 89048
- Class: C2
- ERP: 600 watts
- HAAT: 1070 meters
- Transmitter coordinates: 37°50′24″N 109°27′41″W
- Translators: 96.1 K241AO (Cortez, Colorado); 98.1 K251BC (Kayenta, Arizona); 101.5 K268AV (Moab)

Links
- Public license information: Public file; LMS
- Webcast: Listen live
- Website: redrock92.com

KBDX (92.7 FM) is a radio station broadcasting a classic hits format. Licensed to Blanding, Utah, United States, the station is currently owned by William Boyle, through licensee San Juan Record Inc, and features programming from AP News.

The station's music programming is classic hits, or a blend of 1970s and 1980s pop hits. For public affairs, KBDX carries national reports on the hour, along with weather updates provided by a meteorologist.

The station operates as a Class C2 FM facility, broadcasting its 600-watt signal from a high-elevation transmitter site on Abajo Peak, just west of Monticello, Utah. This location, at an elevation of 11,368 feet (3,465 m), gives the station a wider coverage area, making it audible from areas south of Shiprock, New Mexico, to north of Moab, Utah.

KBDX utilizes a network of FM translators to widen its broadcast area. They are in Moab, Utah: 101.5 FM (K268AV) and Cortez, Colorado: 96.1 FM (K241AO)

== History ==
Prior to KBDX signing on, the area was served by an AM station on 790 known as KUTA. That station signed off in the 1990s. KBDX started as a construction permit in June of 1998, receiving its license to cover in 2001.
