= Shayne Smith (comedian) =

American stand-up comedian and podcaster

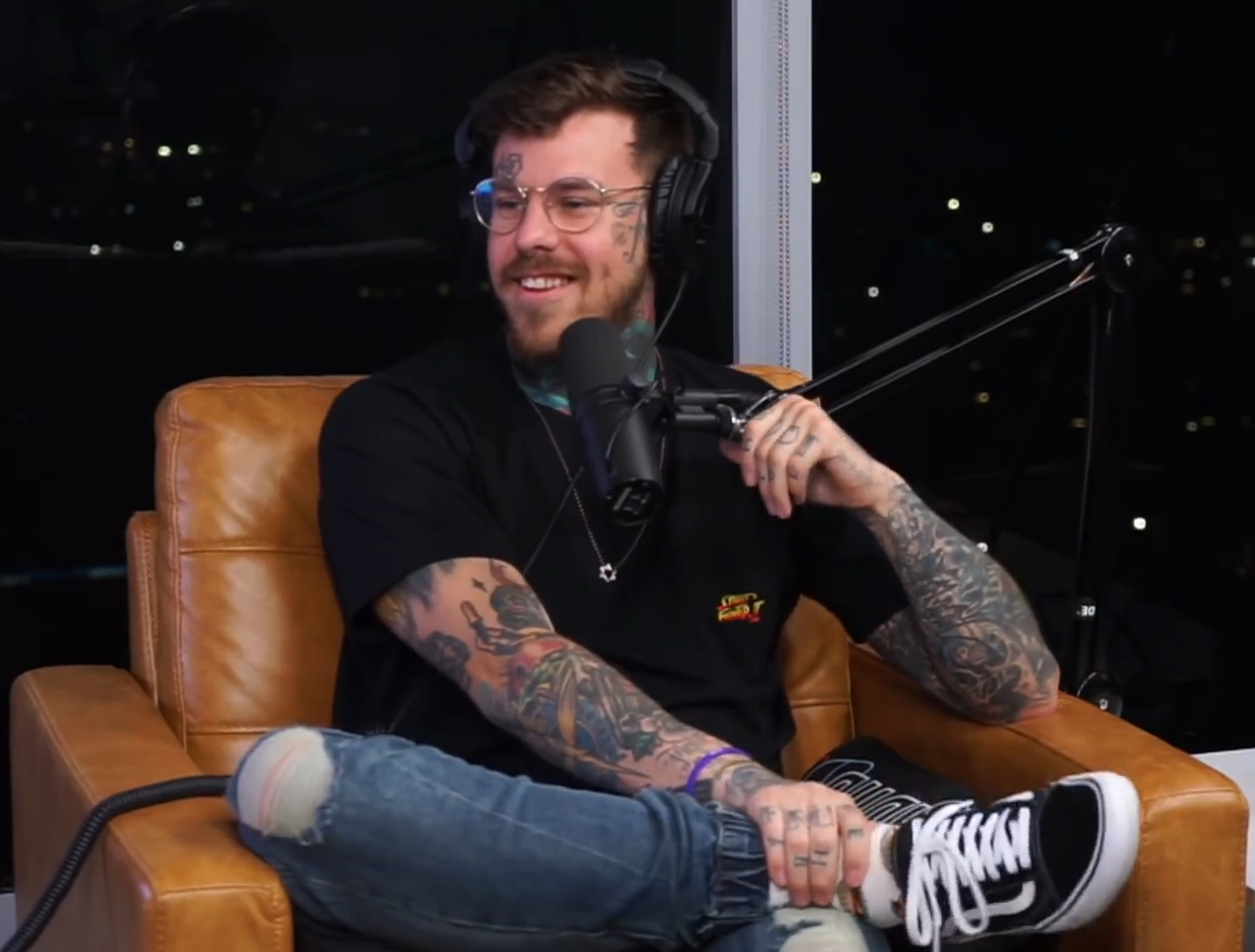
- Smith in 2019
- Born: December 15, 1986 (age 39)

Comedy career
- Medium: Stand-up comedy
- Genres: Observational comedy; black comedy; surreal humor; self-deprecation
- Website: shaynesmithcomedy.com

Shayne Louis Smith (born December 15, 1986) is an American stand-up comedian, writer, podcaster, and vocalist for rock band Painted Devils.

== Early life ==
Smith grew up in Fillmore, Utah. He attended Canyon View High School.

== Career ==
Shayne started performing standup comedy at Wiseguys Comedy Club in 2014. City Weekly named him the Best Alternative Comedian of 2016.

His first special, Prison for Wizards, was released by VidAngel's Dry Bar Comedy in March 2018. Subsequent specials Alligator Boys and The Animal were both released on YouTube in 2021. Smith has also contributed an article on rollerblading to One Blade Magazine.

In January 2025 his most recent special, Ghosts Are Real, was released via Angel Studios.

== Personal life ==
In 2023, Smith began his conversion to Catholicism. In 2024, he was baptized and received the Eucharist during the Easter Vigil.

== Filmography and discography ==
=== Stand-up comedy releases ===
Solo albums and TV specials
Title	Release date	Debut medium
Prison for Wizards	February 26, 2017	Streaming TV (Dry Bar Comedy)
Alligator Boys	February 12, 2019	Streaming TV (Dry Bar Comedy)
The Animal	November 23, 2021	Streaming TV (YouTube)
Banned From Karate	August 2023	Streaming TV (Dry Bar Comedy)
Ghosts Are Real	January 15, 2025	Streaming TV (Dry Bar Comedy)

=== Podcasts ===
Podcasts
Title	Episodes		First released	Last released	Notes
Freaky Geeks	181		August 17, 2016	October 29, 2020	Co-hosted with Noelle Faen.
Cowboy Boys	243	220	July 29, 2019	January 31, 2024	Co-hosted with Mac Arthur.
Cowboy Boys	243	23	February 6, 2024	November 28, 2024	Co-hosted with Mac Arthur.
