= Senate Bill 1690 =

Proposed 2009 Utah law

Utah Senate Bill 1690 is a proposed 2009 law officially titled "A bill to amend the Act of March 1, 1933, to transfer certain authority and resources to the Utah Dineh Corporation, and for other purposes."

The bill was introduced on the Senate floor by Representative Robert Bennett (R-UT) on September 21, 2009. It was referred to the Committee on Indian Affairs. On December 9, 2009, the committee held Senate Hearing 111-538 about the proposed bill. After the hearing, no further action was taken by the committee.

== Background ==
During the 2008 General Session of the Utah Legislature, House Bill 352 was passed, recognizing the repeal of the Utah Navajo Trust Fund. The bill moved the responsibility to fulfill the liabilities and obligations of the repealed Utah Navajo Trust Fund to the Department of Administrative Services, and provided for a transition process until a new recipient of Utah Navajo royalties was designated by Congress.

== Reactions ==
United States Senator Robert Bennett's stated that he was sympathetic to the Navajos residing in San Juan County because they are his constituents. He stated that, in 2008, he had received resolutions from six of the seven Utah Navajo Chapters—the remaining chapter having fewer than fifty members residing in Utah—endorsing the idea of designating a new trustee, as long as that trustee is not the Navajo Nation. Senator Bennett said he believed the chapters did not want the Navajo Nation to serve as trustee because they believed the Nation would use the Utah Navajo Trust Fund for purposes other than what was required by the 1933 Act and 1968 amendments. Senator Bennett continued by stating, "I represent their interests as Utahns in the United States Senate and share their desire to grant them the ability to determine their own future, I agreed to work with them in resolving this problem."

The Senate Committee on Indian Affairs heard testimony about the proposed amendment on December 9, 2009. Kenneth Maryboy, a member of the Board of Directors of the Utah Dineh Corporation and a Navajo Nation Council delegate representing Utah Navajos, testified that the Navajo Nation had previously "failed to be a competent trustee for Utah Navajos" and emphasized that "Congress must not now abandon Utah Navajos by ignoring the history of neglect, unaccountability and malfeasance that the Navajo Nation continues to demonstrate."

According to San Juan County Commissioner-Elect Phil Lyman, "This is an important bill for the Utah Navajos. Utah Dineh Corporation is a well established entity with tremendous potential for effectively developing one of the most underserved areas of the United States. By returning control of this asset to its owners, the Utah Navajos, Senator Bennett will effectively restore hope for real economic development on the Utah Strip of the Navajo Reservation. 100 years of handouts, coupled with tribal, state, and federal politics has certainly not done the job."

Navajo Nation Vice President Ben Shelly testified that the Navajo Nation was the rightful trustee for the fund, and that the Nation was adamantly opposed to the bill. He told the committee that the Navajo Nation would be an accountable, responsible, and transparent trustee in the Utah Navajo Trust Fund, stating that "in the 30 years of administrating the current Utah Navajo Trust Fund, the Navajo Nation has never breached its fiduciary responsibility to the trust fund."

== See also ==
- United States Senate
- Utah Dineh Corporation
- Navajo Nation
- Navajo people
