= Albert R. Lyman =

- Born: January 10, 1880; Fillmore, Utah, United States
- Died: November 12, 1973 (aged 93); Provo, Utah, United States
- Resting place: Blanding, Utah, United States
- Occupations: writer, rancher, attorney, pioneer
- Spouse(s): Mary Ellen "Lell" Perkins (m. 1902; died 1939) Gladys P. Lyman (m. 1939; died 1972)
- Children: 15

Albert R. Lyman (January 10, 1880 – November 12, 1973) was an American writer and pioneer. He and his family were the first settlers of what is now Blanding, Utah.

== Early life ==
Albert Robison Lyman was born on January 10, 1880, in Fillmore, Utah, to Platte D. Lyman and Adelia Robison. At the time of Albert Lyman's birth, his father was working on the road through Hole-in-the-Rock. Lyman grew up in Scipio and Bluff. Lyman was baptized into the Church of Jesus Christ of Latter-day Saints on April 2, 1888. Early in life, viewing the cruelty of the world, he was an atheist. He was converted after an experience with prayer at the Colorado River that led him to "know there is a God...in a way I can not deny." In 1898 he went on a mission to Great Britain (he had been called to the Southern States Mission, but the call was changed to the British Isles upon his arrival in Salt Lake City that he might serve under his father who was the president of the European mission at the time.) for The Church of Jesus Christ of Latter-day Saints. While there, he visited many libraries which led him to his passion for literature and education. Lyman returned home after a year and a half on November 13, 1900, due to poor health. Upon his return, he married Mary Ellen Perkins. In 1905, they would be the first settlers of White Mesa (now Blanding). They lived in a tent during the summer as they prepared to pioneer the area. Lyman ran a farm and a small mercantile business in Blanding.

== Career ==
Lyman became the County Superintendent of Schools for San Juan County, a school in a tent, in 1908. He would continue to teach school and seminary for 27 years. He founded a school for Native American children in 1946. It was originally kept out of city limits by the citizens, but later years of difficulty in maintaining the school, it was allowed to be brought into Blanding. On the first day of school, the Lymans taught and fed 28 Navajo and Paiute children. During the school's first year, support was shown by the LDS Church with a visit from President George Albert Smith and apostles Matthew Cowley and Spencer W. Kimball.

Lyman kept extensive diaries and journals (thoughts and impressions entitled Thots numbered 70 volumes, with 41 volumes of diaries). He wrote a weekly column for the San Juan Record titled "The Old Settler." In order to make time for writing, Lyman built "a small one-room native sandstone structure" on his property for the purpose. While writing, he raised a flag to warn his children away. His studio, the "Swallow’s Nest," is now part of the Blanding Visitors Center. Lyman died on November 12, 1973, after moving to Provo, Utah, to live with his daughter, and was buried in the Blanding cemetery.

== Religious leadership ==
In addition to the mission of his youth, Lyman also served a mission with his wife to the Navajo-Zuni Mission in 1944–1945. Upon settling Blanding, Utah, he was the Stake Superintendent of the Young Men's Mutual Improvement Association for San Juan, which required him to travel throughout southeastern Utah, Colorado, and New Mexico. He also served as first and second counselor in a stake presidency and as a patriarch.

== Personal life ==
Albert Lyman married Mary Ellen "Lell" Perkins on June 26, 1902, in Salt Lake City. They had been writing each other letters while he was serving his mission. They moved to Blanding with their first child Casse. All but the first of their fifteen children would be born in the Blanding area. In 1935, his wife became ill and moved to Salt Lake City to receive better medical treatment. Lyman and the rest of his family moved to Salt Lake City in 1938 to spend time with her before she died on May 13, 1939. His wife told him to marry her previously widowed sister Gladys. He married Gladys on June 14, 1939.

== Legacy ==
Albert Lyman and his family were the first settlers of Blanding, Utah and he helped develop the school system in San Juan County, as well as built schools for Native Americans in Blanding. Lyman wrote fictional stories and histories of San Juan County and Blanding as well as an autobiography. His many personal journals and diaries serve to illustrate life in southeastern Utah during the 1900s. The Albert R. Lyman collection, which includes his personal writings and his Thots, resides in the L. Tom Perry Special Collections in the Harold B. Lee Library at Brigham Young University.

== Works ==
=== Novels ===
- 1936: Voice of the Intangible (republished as Man to Man)
- 1948: Fort on the Firing Line Albert R Lyman (serialized in The Improvement Era)
- 1963: The Outlaw of Navajo Mountain
- 1964: The Native Blood

=== Autobiography ===
- 196?: The Great Adventure: A Story with a Preamble and Told in the First Person Singular

=== Nonfiction ===
- 1930: Pahute Biscuits
- 1936: Bishop Jens Nielson, History and Genealogy
- 1955: History of Blanding, 1905-1955
- 1957: Amasa Mason Lyman, Trailblazer and Pioneer from the Atlantic to the Pacific
- 1957: Lucretia Hancock Robison
- 1957: Lyman Family History
- 1958: Biography Francis Marion Lyman
- 1962: Indians and Outlaws: Settling of the San Juan frontier
- 1965: History of San Juan County, 1879 - 1917
- 1966: The Edge of the Cedars: the Story of Walter C. Lyman and the San Juan Mission
- 1967: Lemuel Hardison Redd, Jr.
- 1970: A Voice Calling: from the hills of America to the children of its ancient people
- 1972: The Trail of the Ancients

== Books about Lyman ==
- The Old Settler: A Biography of Albert R. Lyman by Karl R Lyman
