= Mark Maryboy =

American politician (born 1955)

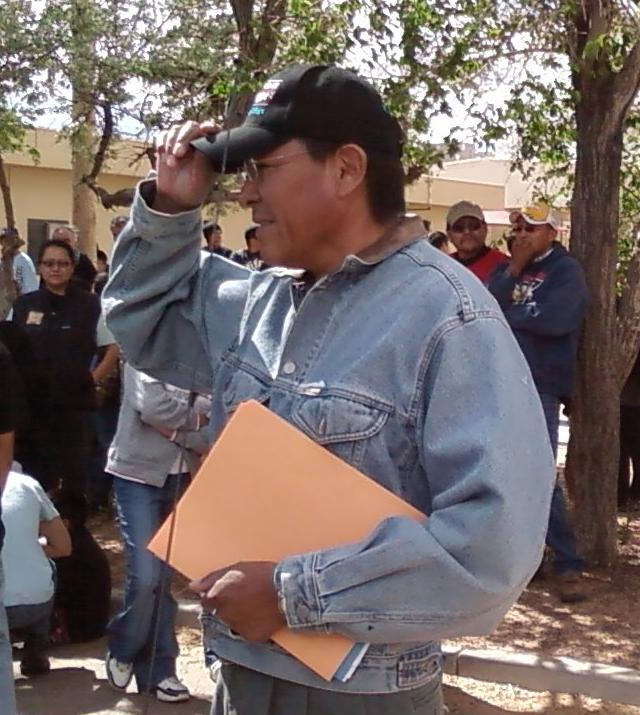
- Mark Maryboy speaking at a community gathering in Utah

Navajo Nation Council Delegate
- In office January 1, 1991 – January 1, 2007
- Succeeded by: Davis Filfred Jr.

Personal details
- Born: December 10, 1955 (age 70) Bluff, Utah, United States
- Party: Democratic
- Spouse: Roselyn Maryboy
- Education: University of Utah (BA)

Mark Maryboy (born December 10, 1955) is a retired American politician. He represented San Juan County, Utah as a County Commissioner, serving three terms, and formerly served on the Navajo Nation Council Delegate for the Utah Navajo Section. He is a member of the Navajo tribe Nation and the brother of Kenneth Maryboy, who currently serves on the Navajo Nation Council Delegate.

Maryboy was first elected as the San Juan County, Utah, Commissioner for District Three in 1986, becoming the first Native American to be elected County Commissioner in Utah's history.

In 2013, Maryboy, in collaboration with Rebecca M. Benally and a group of protesters from the Aneth Chapter, organized a three-day blockade of the main ExxonMobil corporate office in Aneth, Utah.

== Biography ==
Mark Maryboy was born on December 10, 1955, at St. Christopher's Mission near Bluff, Utah. He was the fifth of eight children and grew up on a Navajo Nation reservation living in a traditional Navajo Hogan. Maryboy attended BIA boarding schools in both Kayenta and Aneth.

After Maryboy graduated from San Juan High School in Blanding, Utah, He attended the University of Utah, where he majored in history and minored in business. He graduated in 1978 with a Bachelor of Arts.

Mark Maryboy at a campaign rally

After graduation, Maryboy returned to the Navajo Nation and served as the director of education for the Utah Navajo Development Council, supervising Head Start, adult education, and vocational education programs. In 1986, Maryboy ran for San Juan County Commissioner. He often clashed with former commissioner Calvin Black, a Republican, member, during commission meetings.

San Juan County, which includes the Utah section of the Navajo Nation near its southern state line with Arizona.

In November 1990, Maryboy was elected to the Navajo Nation Council as a delegate from the Aneth area. He served on the advisory board of the College of Social & Behavioral Science at the University of Utah. He also served as the chairman of the Navajo Nation Council Budget & Finance Committee.

Maryboy met former president Bill Clinton in 1992 at the Democratic National Convention at Madison Square Garden. He was appointed to serve on the Utah Advisory Committee for the United States Commission on Civil Rights in 1993. In 1994, President Clinton appointed him to serve on the National Advisory Council on Indian Education.

In April 2006, Navajo Nation Council Speaker Lawrence T. Morgan was charged with criminal battery after allegedly striking Council Delegate Mark Maryboy in the chest. The incident occurred after Maryboy complained that Morgan did not help him introduce legislation that had been skipped earlier that day. The item—formal condolences to the family of late Council Delegate Curley John of Aneth, whose family was in the gallery—was skipped because Maryboy was out of the Council Chambers speaking with constituents. Maryboy later attempted to re-add the item to the agenda but was ruled out of order.

== Utah Navajo Commission ==
The Utah Navajo Commission manages revenues derived from mineral development on the Utah portion of the reservation for the Utah Navajos, whose population is nearing 10,000 enrolled members. Maryboy serves with this entity, overseeing the deployment of monetary funds and addressing Navajo energy issues in San Juan County.

=== Navajo water rights issue ===
In 2002, Maryboy and the Utah Navajo Commission urged the Navajo Nation to reassert Colorado River water claims the tribe waived in the late 1960s to help facilitate a power plant near Page, Arizona. In 2020, the Senate unanimously passed the Utah Navajo Water Rights Settlement Act, which would recognize the Navajo's right to 81,500 acre-feet (100,500,000 m^{3}) of water from the Colorado River.

According to the Utah Navajo Commission, the tribe could claim between one and 2,000,000 acre-feet (2.5 km^{3}) of Colorado River water. The council waived at least a portion of its rights in a 1968 agreement with the federal government and the Salt River Project, which planned to build a coal-fired power plant near Page. The council agreed not to demand more than 50,000 acre-feet (62,000,000 m^{3}) of Colorado River water so that 34,100 acre-feet (42,100,000 m^{3}) could be diverted to the plant.

== Utah Navajo oil ==
In 1997, residents began protesting Exxon-Mobil's policies affecting the Utah Navajo community. Protesters from the Aneth Chapter blocked the main office of ExxonMobil Corporation for 3 days at the McCalmon Oil Plant near Aneth, Utah. The protest was composed of local Navajo people.

Former Navajo Nation president Albert Hale was also present in the northernmost corner of the Navajo Nation, where the protest was initiated. Maryboy, along with members of the Aneth community, worked to create a new standard for Navajo workers in the Aneth area, as well as for the hiring process.

== Life after politics ==
Heeding his father's wishes, He did not seek a fifth term on the council. In 1999, Maryboy established Utah Navajo Health Systems along with Donna Singer and supported tribal legislation that allows the agency to keep its profits rather than return them to Window Rock.
