= Carson Jorgensen =

21st-century Utah politician

Chair of the Utah Republican Party
- In office May 1, 2021 – April 22, 2023
- Preceded by: Derek Brown
- Succeeded by: Rob Axson

Personal details
- Born: 1988 or 1989 (age 36–37); Mount Pleasant, Utah, U.S.
- Political party: Republican
- Education: Snow College; Utah Valley University (AS)

Carson Jorgensen (born 1988/1989) is an American politician who served as the chairman of the Utah Republican Party from 2021 to 2023. He was elected in convention on May 1, 2021. At the time of his election, Jorgensen was 31 years old, making him the youngest state Republican Party chair in Utah history and one of the youngest state Republican chairs ever elected in the United States.

Party political offices
| Preceded by Derek Brown | Chair of the Utah Republican Party; 2021–2023 | Succeeded by Rob Axson |
