= Rob Axson =

American political operative

Chair of the Utah Republican Party
- Incumbent
- Assumed office April 22, 2023
- Preceded by: Carson Jorgensen

Personal details
- Party: Republican
- Education: University of Utah (BA)

Robert Axson is an American political operative serving as the Chairman of the Utah Republican Party since 2023. He previously served as a staffer to Utah Senator Mike Lee and as vice-chairman of the Party.

Axson was elected unopposed as chairman after his only opponent, Republican Party state treasurer Mike Bird, dropped out of the race.

Party political offices
Preceded by Carson Jorgensen	Chair of the Utah Republican Party; 2023–present	Incumbent
