= Fillmore, Utah =

City in Utah, United States

- City
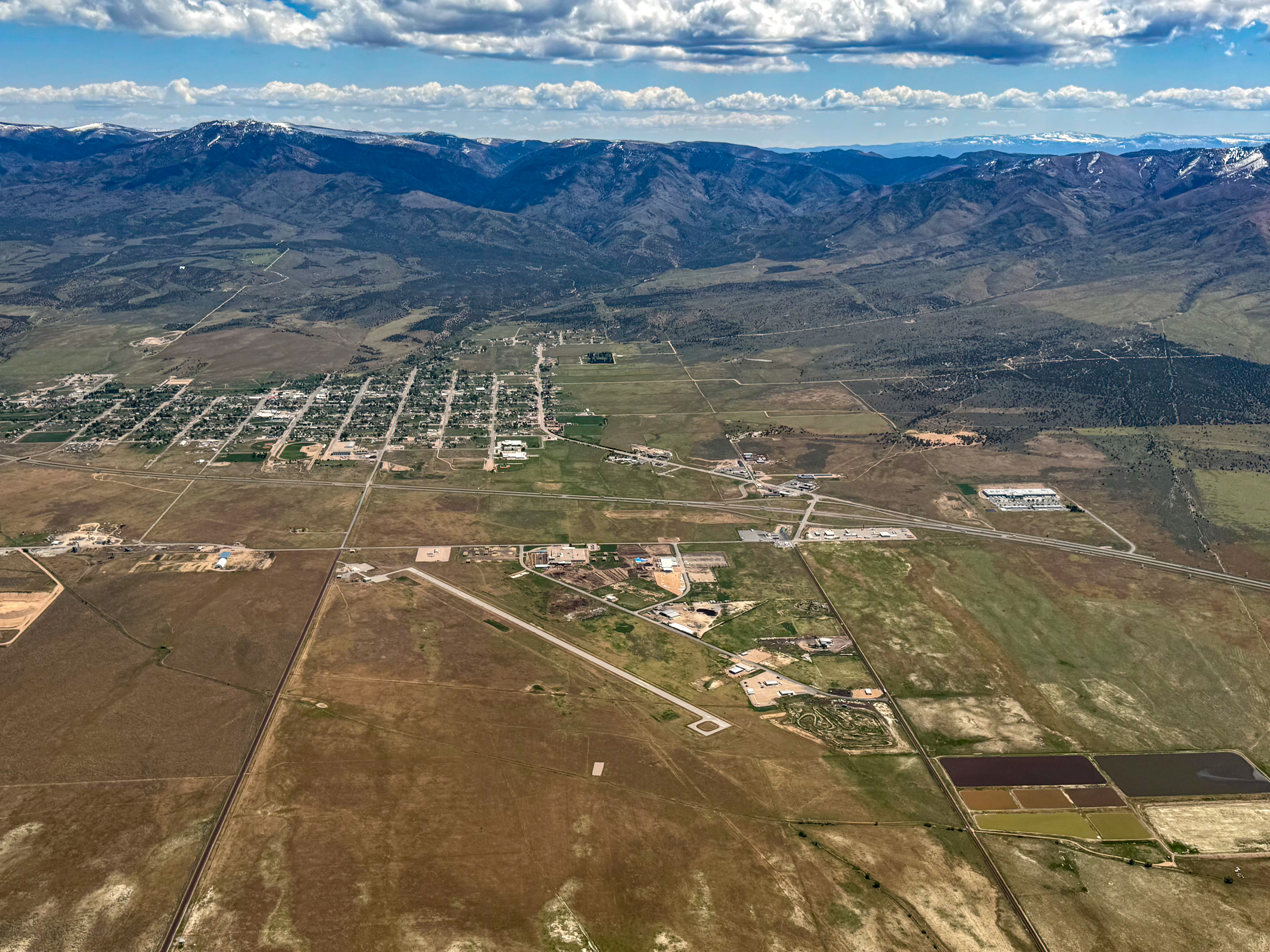
- Aerial view of Fillmore, Fillmore Airport, and mountains

- Location in Millard County and the state of Utah

- Location within Utah Location within the United States
- Coordinates: 38°57′51″N 112°20′19″W
- Country: United States
- State: Utah
- County: Millard
- Founded: 1851
- Named for: Millard Fillmore

Area
  - Total: 6.97 sq mi (18.04 km^{2})
  - Land: 6.97 sq mi (18.04 km^{2})
  - Water: 0 sq mi (0.00 km^{2})
- Elevation: 5,072 ft (1,546 m)

Population (2020)
  - Total: 2,592
  - Density: 372.1/sq mi (143.68/km^{2})
- Time zone: UTC−7 (Mountain)
  - Summer (DST): UTC−6 (MDT)
- ZIP code: 84631
- Area code: 435
- FIPS code: 49-25510
- GNIS feature ID: 2410505
- Website: https://www.fillmoreutah.gov

Fillmore is a city in and the county seat of Millard County, Utah, United States. The population was 2,592 at the 2020 United States census. It is named for the thirteenth U.S. President Millard Fillmore, who was in office when Millard County was created by the Utah Territorial legislature.

Fillmore was the capital of the Utah Territory from 1851 to 1856, although the territorial legislature met in Fillmore only one term (1855). The original Utah Territorial Statehouse building still stands.

== History ==
Fillmore, located near the geographic center of the territory, was originally built as the capital of Utah Territory. The Utah Territorial Legislature approved a plan to locate the capital in the Pahvant Valley. On October 28, 1851, Utah governor Brigham Young chose the specific site for Fillmore. Jesse W. Fox, that same day, surveyed the town. Anson Call headed the colonizing company that shortly followed; they built houses, a grist mill, and a sawmill. The capitol building was begun in 1852.

In the following years, some disagreements developed with the Native Americans in the area, but Brigham Young sent Dimick B. Huntington to the area, and he managed to negotiate peace. The region was considered a route, along the 38th parallel, for the transcontinental railroad. Captain John W. Gunnison, leading a military party surveying the region, was attacked by a band of Pahvants (Ute) west of Fillmore. Gunnison and seven of his men were killed (October 1853). During the 1860s, two forts, Fort Deseret and Cove Fort were constructed nearby as protection from Indian unrest.

In 1855, the territorial legislature met in Fillmore. However, in 1856, the legislature decided to move the Territorial Capital to the larger community of Salt Lake City.

== Geography ==
Fillmore lies in the Pahvant Valley, near the base of the Pahvant Mountain Range.

According to the United States Census Bureau, the city has a total area of 5.8 square miles (14.9 km^{2}), all land.

=== Climate ===
In the Köppen climate classification, Fillmore has either a humid subtropical climate (Cfa) or humid continental climate (Dfa) depending on which variant of the system is used.

Climate data for Fillmore, Utah (1981–2010)
Month	Jan	Feb	Mar	Apr	May	Jun	Jul	Aug	Sep	Oct	Nov	Dec	Year
Mean daily maximum °F (°C)	39.0 (3.9)	44.9 (7.2)	55.5 (13.1)	63.9 (17.7)	73.7 (23.2)	83.4 (28.6)	90.2 (32.3)	87.9 (31.1)	78.9 (26.1)	65.8 (18.8)	50.6 (10.3)	38.9 (3.8)	64.4 (18.0)
Mean daily minimum °F (°C)	20.1 (−6.6)	24.1 (−4.4)	31.2 (−0.4)	36.9 (2.7)	44.5 (6.9)	52.6 (11.4)	59.9 (15.5)	59.2 (15.1)	50.3 (10.2)	38.9 (3.8)	28.6 (−1.9)	20.1 (−6.6)	40.2 (4.6)
Average precipitation inches (mm)	1.31 (33)	1.47 (37)	1.98 (50)	1.85 (47)	1.63 (41)	0.89 (23)	0.74 (19)	0.79 (20)	1.10 (28)	1.81 (46)	1.48 (38)	1.50 (38)	16.52 (420)
Average snowfall inches (cm)	11.2 (28)	12.9 (33)	11.4 (29)	6.8 (17)	1.0 (2.5)	0.1 (0.25)	0.0 (0.0)	0.0 (0.0)	0.1 (0.25)	2.2 (5.6)	9.9 (25)	13.8 (35)	69.6 (177)
Source: NOAA

== Demographics ==
Historical population
Census	Pop.	Note	%±
1860	715		—
1870	905		26.6%
1880	987		9.1%
1890	838		−15.1%
1900	1,037		23.7%
1910	1,191		14.9%
1920	1,490		25.1%
1930	1,374		−7.8%
1940	1,785		29.9%
1950	1,890		5.9%
1960	1,602		−15.2%
1970	1,411		−11.9%
1980	2,083		47.6%
1990	1,956		−6.1%
2000	2,253		15.2%
2010	2,435		8.1%
2020	2,592		6.4%
US Decennial Census

In 1853, 304 people were recorded as belonging in the LDS Church congregation when John A. Ray replaced Anson Call as the leader of the Mormons in Fillmore. In 1880, the larger population was divided into two LDS congregations ("wards"). In November 1882, the two congregations were joined again. In 1920, the congregation was again divided. In 1930 Fillmore had a population of 1374.

=== 2020 census ===
As of the 2020 census, Fillmore had a population of 2,592, a median age of 36.5 years, 29.6% of residents under the age of 18, and 17.1% who were 65 years of age or older. For every 100 females there were 100.0 males, and for every 100 females age 18 and over there were 100.1 males age 18 and over.

It was entirely rural, with 0.0% of residents living in urban areas and 100.0% living in rural areas.

There were 849 households in Fillmore, of which 39.0% had children under the age of 18 living in them. Of all households, 62.3% were married-couple households, 12.4% were households with a male householder and no spouse or partner present, and 20.7% were households with a female householder and no spouse or partner present. About 21.4% of all households were made up of individuals and 10.8% had someone living alone who was 65 years of age or older.

There were 955 housing units, of which 11.1% were vacant; the homeowner vacancy rate was 1.2% and the rental vacancy rate was 8.3%.

A Utah Demographics profile for Fillmore reports a median household income of $70,669.

The racial composition as of the 2020 census is shown below.

Racial composition as of the 2020 census
Race	Number	Percent
White	1,925	74.3%
Black or African American	6	0.2%
American Indian and Alaska Native	53	2.0%
Asian	74	2.9%
Native Hawaiian and Other Pacific Islander	9	0.3%
Some other race	332	12.8%
Two or more races	193	7.4%
Hispanic or Latino (of any race)	529	20.4%

=== 2010 census ===
As of the 2010 census, Fillmore had a population of 2,435. The ethnic and racial make-up of the population was 78.7% non-Hispanic white, 1.1% Native American, 1.6% Asian, 0.1% Native Hawaiian, 2.3% reporting two or more races, and 17.2% Hispanic or Latino.

=== 2000 census ===
As of the 2000 United States census, there were 2,253 people, 732 households, and 562 families in the city. The population density was 388.4/sqmi (150.0/km^{2}). There were 823 housing units at an average density of 141.9/sqmi (54.8/km^{2}). The racial makeup of the city was 91.70% White, 0.09% African American, 1.38% Native American, 2.00% Asian, 3.46% from other races, and 1.38% from two or more races. Hispanic or Latino of any race were 11.19% of the population.

There were 732 households, out of which 43.9% had children under 18 living with them, 64.8% were married couples living together, 8.9% had a female householder with no husband present, and 23.1% were non-families. 21.9% of all households were made up of individuals, and 12.4% had someone living alone who was 65 years of age or older. The average household size was 3.06, and the average family size was 3.62.

The city population contained 36.8% under 18, 8.3% from 18 to 24, 23.7% from 25 to 44, 17.8% from 45 to 64, and 13.3% who were 65 years of age or older. The median age was 30 years. For every 100 females, there were 98.3 males. For every 100 females aged 18 and over, there were 96.3 males.

The median income for a household in the city was $31,719, and the median income for a family was $34,830. Males had a median income of $31,944 versus $20,000 for females. The per capita income for the city was $12,061. About 15.6% of families and 21.0% of the population were below the poverty line, including 27.1% of those under age 18 and 11.9% of those aged 65 or over.

== Government ==
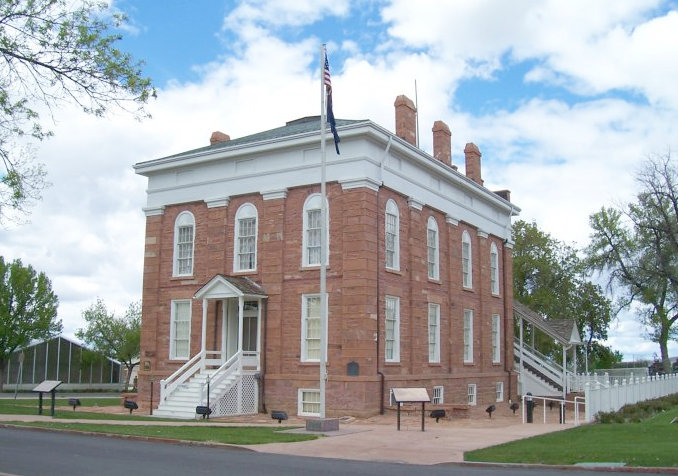
Utah Territorial Statehouse

Fillmore has a city council consisting of five council members as well as the mayor and city attorney. As of April 2020, the current mayor of Fillmore is Michael D. Holt.

== Notable people ==
- Albert R. Lyman, author and pioneer
- Sam Melville, actor
- Culbert Olson, 29th governor of California
- Clarence Robison, track athlete and coach
- Richard A. Robison, paleontologist
- Shayne Smith, stand-up comedian
- Earle Spencer, trombonist and bandleader
- Arnold Williams, 21st governor of Idaho
