= Phil Lyman =

American politician

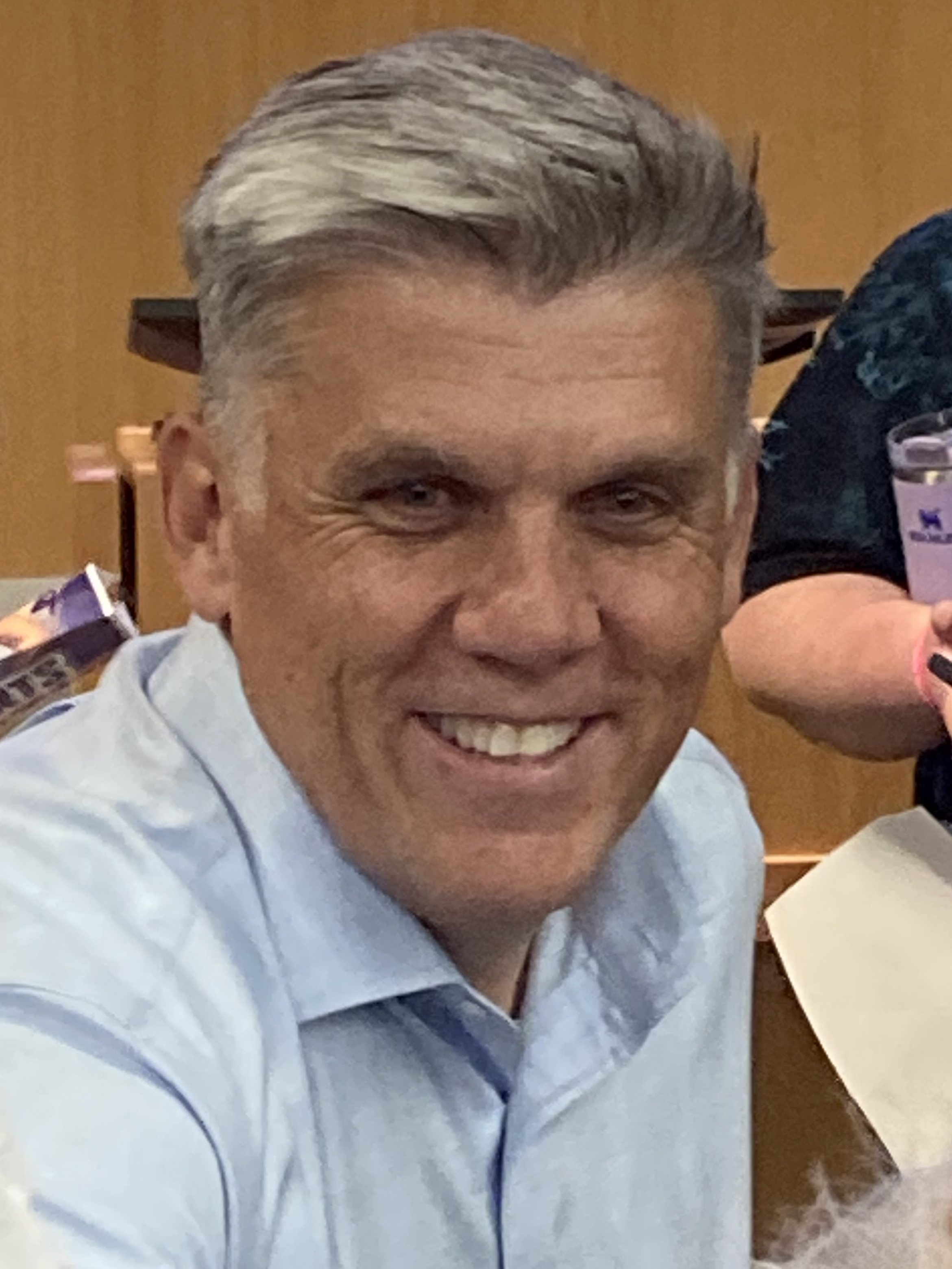
- Lyman in 2024

Member of the Utah House of Representatives
- In office January 1, 2019 – December 31, 2024
- Preceded by: Michael Noel
- Succeeded by: Logan Monson
- Constituency: 73rd district (2019–2023); 69th district (2023–2024)

Personal details
- Born: Phillip Kay Lyman Blanding, Utah, U.S.
- Party: Republican
- Spouse: Jody Shumway
- Children: 5
- Education: Brigham Young University (BS); University of Utah (MS)

Phillip Kay Lyman is an American politician who represented the 69th district in the Utah House of Representatives from 2019 to 2024. A resident of Blanding, he is a member of the Republican Party.

During the 2022 legislative session, Lyman served on the Natural Resources, Agriculture, and Environmental Quality Appropriations Subcommittee; House Government Operations Committee; House Natural Resources, Agriculture, and Environment Committee; and Legislative Water Development Commission.

Lyman was a candidate for governor of Utah in 2024, challenging incumbent Spencer Cox in the Republican primary. Lyman lost to Cox 45 to 54%, and later mounted an unsuccessful write-in campaign campaign for the general election.

== Life and professional career ==
By profession, Lyman is a Certified Public Accountant and has been active in the business community in Blanding and the surrounding region. He earned a B.S. in Accounting from Brigham Young University as well as a M.S. in Accounting from the University of Utah. He is married to Jody Shumway Lyman and they have five children. Lyman is a member of the American Institute of Certified Public Accountants and has worked as an AICPA Personal Financial Specialist. Serving as the San Juan County Commissioner from 2011 to 2018, Lyman was voted Commissioner of the year by Utah Association of Counties. Lyman has served as Charter President of the Rotary Club of Blanding, Utah.

== Political career ==
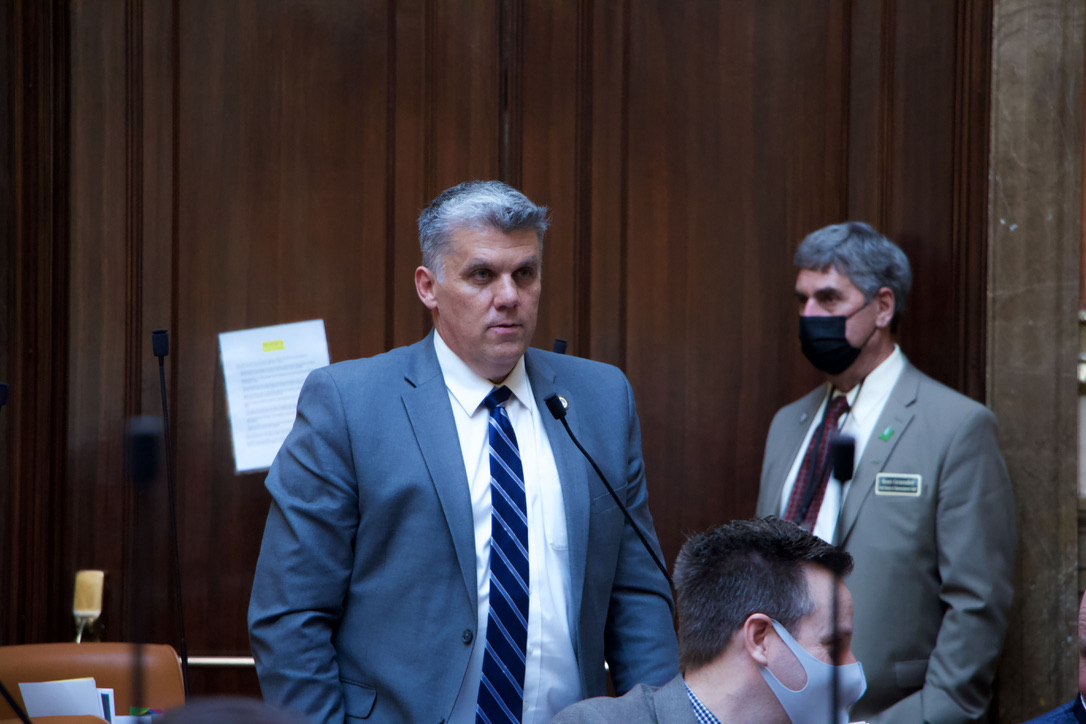
Lyman in 2021

As a San Juan County Commissioner, Lyman served as chairman of the board of commissioners, as chairman of the Seven County Infrastructure Coalition, as a member of the Pension Finance and Inter-governmental Relations Committee and Native American Relations Subcommittee in NACO (the National Association of Counties). While commissioner he helped to establish the San Juan County Public Health Department which brought services to the Southeast Corner of Utah and especially to the Navajos living on the Utah portion of the Utah Navajo Reservation. Lyman has been described as a firebrand in the State Legislature where he replaced another notable firebrand Mike Noel in 2019. After his primary loss against governor Spencer Cox, Lyman ran in 2025 for State GOP Chairman against incumbent Rob Axson. He lost 1,340 (52.4%) to 1,215 (47.6%) at the state convention.

== Federal government protest ==
December 2020 pardon granted by Donald Trump

In May 2014, Lyman organized an ATV protest ride in Recapture Canyon, which was closed to motorized vehicles by the Bureau of Land Management (BLM) to protect cultural artifacts. Lyman and Monte Wells, a co-defendant, were later convicted of operating off-road vehicles on public lands closed to such vehicles. The protest was seen by Lyman and his supporters as an act of civil disobedience against what they perceived as federal overreach and excessive regulation of public lands.

Federal land management agencies and conservationists viewed the protest as a violation of established regulations aimed at preserving sensitive archaeological sites and protecting cultural resources. Lyman and Wells faced trial, were found guilty, and sentenced to serve jail time, pay fines, and undergo probation. Their convictions stemmed from their role in organizing and publicizing the protest ride, despite the BLM's closure of the area. The legal proceedings underscored the clash between local interests advocating for increased access to public lands and federal authorities responsible for enforcing land use regulations and protecting natural and cultural resources.

While Lyman and his supporters viewed the protest as a legitimate form of dissent against what they perceived as federal overreach, federal prosecutors argued that the protest constituted a deliberate violation of established laws and regulations governing public land use, a view supported by Judge David Nuffer who presided over the case. Lyman attempted to challenge his conviction, arguing that the BLM lacked authority to close the route. However, his motion for a new trial was denied by Judge Nuffer, the federal judge overseeing the case. The legal challenges highlighted the broader legal and jurisdictional issues surrounding federal land management policies and the extent of federal authority over public lands. While Lyman and his supporters questioned the legality of the closure and the authority of federal agencies to regulate public land use, federal prosecutors and conservationists maintained that the closures were necessary to protect sensitive archaeological sites and preserve cultural resources for future generations.

In December 2020, President Donald Trump granted clemency to Phil Lyman, along with several other individuals. Lyman expressed gratitude for the pardon, viewing it as a correction of past injustice related to his conviction. The presidential pardon reignited debates over the appropriateness of pardoning individuals convicted of environmental and public land management-related offenses. While Lyman and his supporters welcomed the pardon as a vindication of their opposition to federal land management policies, critics viewed it as undermining the enforcement of environmental laws and regulations and setting a dangerous precedent for future acts of civil disobedience on public lands.

== Electoral history ==
Utah House of Representatives District 73 General Election, 2018
Party	Candidate	Votes	%
Republican	Phil Lyman	9,388	67.37%
Independent	Marsha Holland	4,528	32.53%
Total votes		13,916	100.0
Republican hold			

Utah House of Representatives District 73 General Election, 2020
Party	Candidate	Votes	%
Republican	Phil Lyman (incumbent)	14,518	100.0%
Total votes		14,518	100.0
Republican hold			

Utah House of Representatives District 69 General Election, 2022
Party	Candidate	Votes	%
Republican	Phil Lyman (incumbent)	11,170	58.98%
Democratic	Davina Smith	7,766	41.02%
Total votes		18,936	100.0
Republican hold			

Utah Gubernatorial Election Republican Primary, 2024
Party	Candidate	Votes	%
Republican	Spencer Cox (incumbent) Deidre Henderson (incumbent)	232,164	54.40%
Republican	Phil Lyman Natalie Clawson	194,639	45.60%
Total votes		426,803	100.00%
