= Blanding, Utah =

City in Utah, United States

Blanding, Utah Shash Jaa'
- City
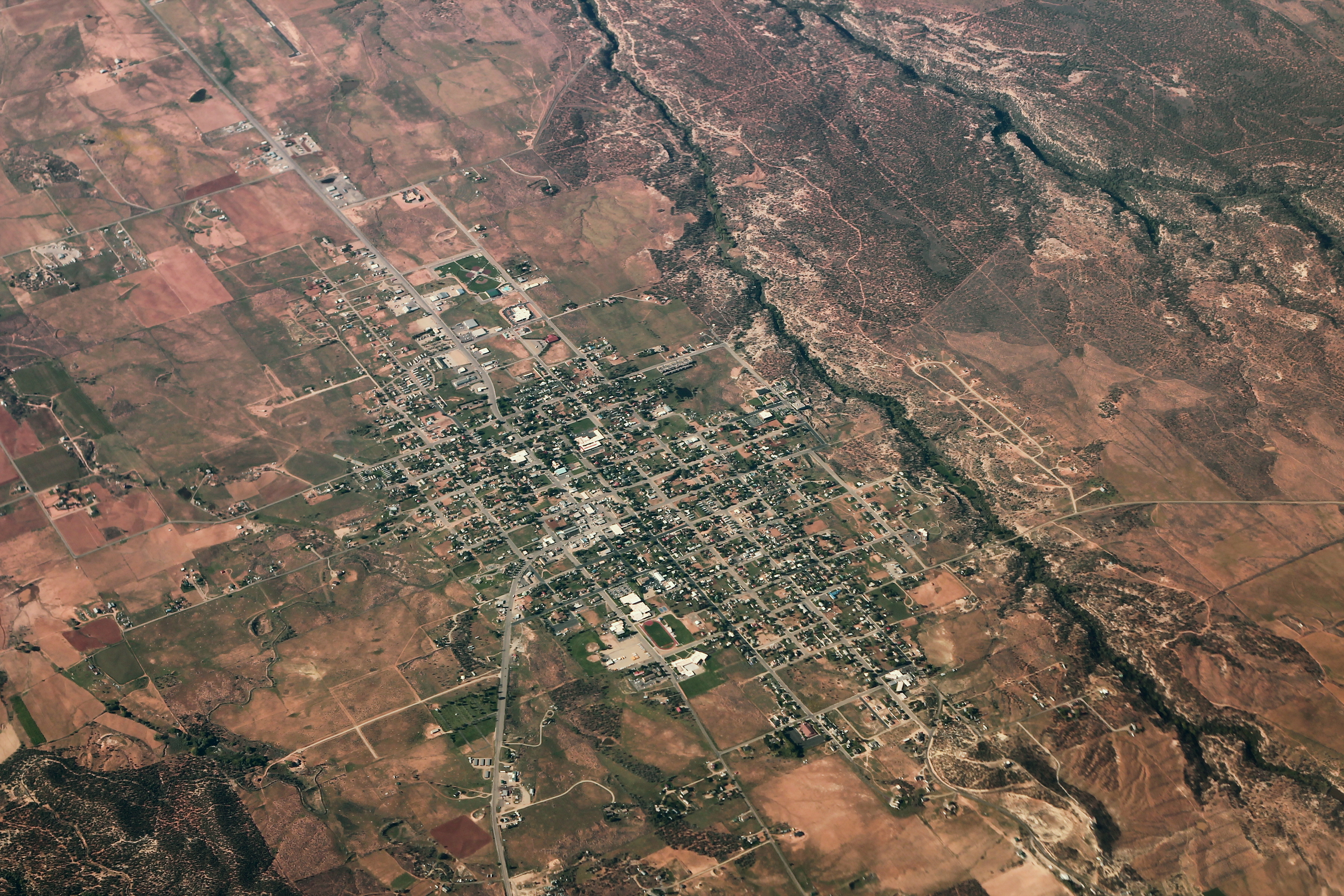
- Aerial view of Blanding
- Motto: Basecamp to Adventure
- Location in San Juan County and the state of Utah.
- Coordinates: 37°37′24″N 109°28′44″W
- Country: United States
- State: Utah
- County: San Juan
- Founded: 1905
- Founder: Walter C. Lyman
- Named for: Amelia Blanding Bicknell

Government
  - Mayor: Trevor Olsen

Area
  - Total: 13.22 sq mi (34.23 km^{2})
  - Land: 13.18 sq mi (34.13 km^{2})
  - Water: 0.042 sq mi (0.11 km^{2})
- Elevation: 6,099 ft (1,859 m)

Population (2020)
  - Total: 3,394
  - Density: 275.7/sq mi (106.46/km^{2})
- Time zone: UTC-7 (MST)
  - Summer (DST): UTC-6 (MDT)
- ZIP code: 84511
- Area code: 435
- FIPS code: 49-06370
- GNIS feature ID: 2409863
- Website: blanding-ut.gov

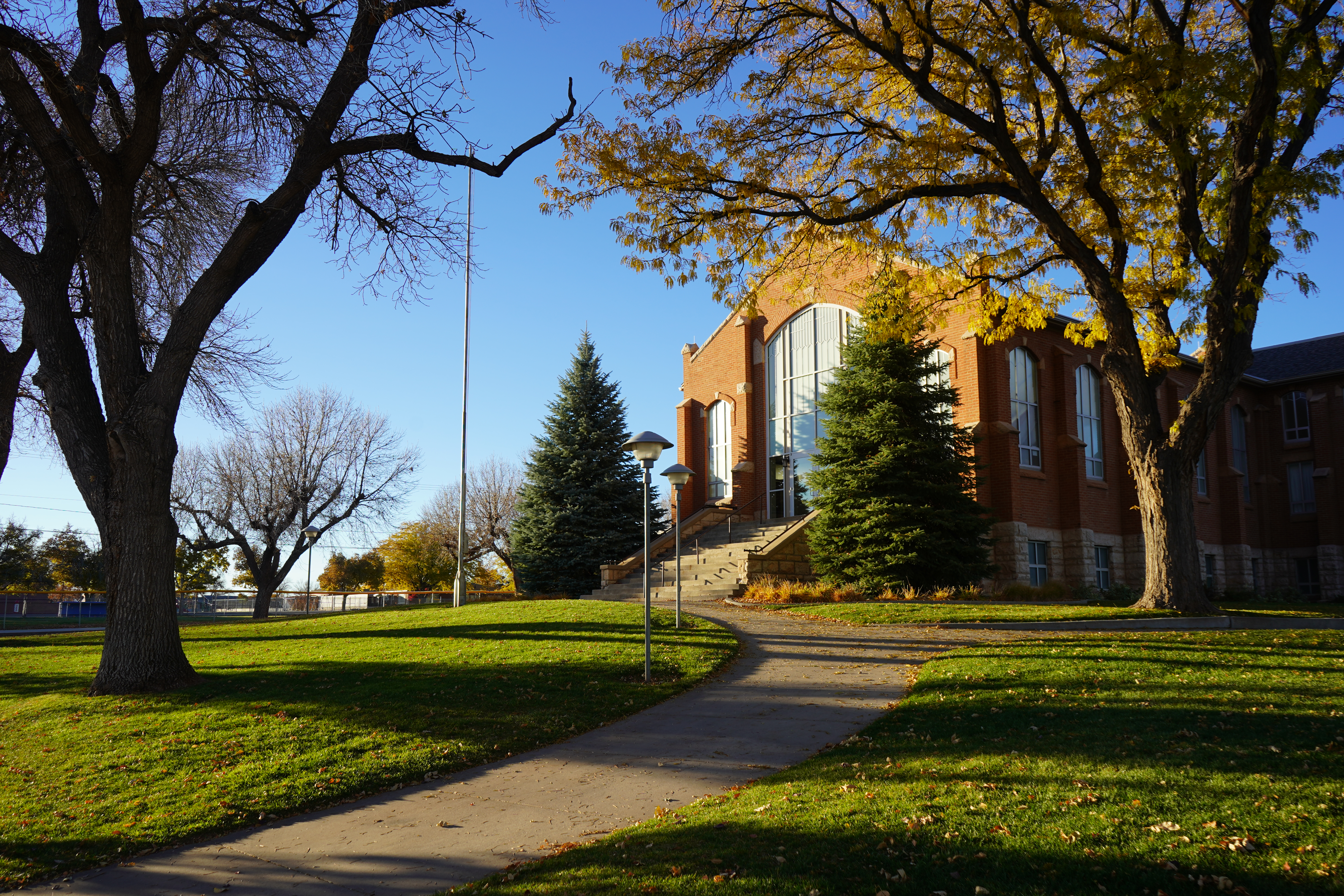
LDS Church South Chapel

Blanding (/ˈblændɪŋ/) (Navajo: Shash Jaaʼ) is a city in San Juan County, Utah, United States. The population was 3,394 at the 2020 census, making it the most populated city in San Juan County. It was settled in the late 19th century by Mormon settlers, predominantly from the famed Hole-In-The-Rock expedition. Economic contributors include mineral processing, mining, agriculture, local commerce, tourism, and transportation.

Blanding is located near both the Navajo and White Mesa Ute Native American reservations and a significant percentage of Blanding's population has family ties to these nearby cultures. Blanding is a gateway to an abundance of nearby natural and archaeological resources, including The Dinosaur Museum, Natural Bridges National Monument, Monument Valley, and the Four Corners area, Glen Canyon National Recreation Area (Lake Powell), Cedar Mesa archaeological and wilderness area, the San Juan River including Goosenecks State Park, and the Needles district of Canyonlands National Park. It is located approximately 1 hour south of the popular recreation hub of Moab and Arches National Park.

Blanding is home to one of the nine statewide regional campuses of Utah State University.

== History ==
First known as Grayson (after Nellie Grayson Lyman, wife of settler Joseph Lyman), the town changed its name in 1914 when a wealthy easterner, Thomas W. Bicknell, offered a thousand-volume library to any town that would adopt his name. Grayson competed with Thurber, Utah (renamed Bicknell) for the prize. Grayson was renamed Blanding after the maiden name of Bicknell's wife, and each town received 500 books.

On the morning of June 10, 2009, sixteen Blanding residents were arrested in more than a dozen raids performed by federal agents and indicted as part of an undercover investigation of violations of the Archeological Resources Protection Act. Eight others around the Four Corners region were also indicted. The raid was the largest undercover sting of its kind in the country. The raid was the conclusion of a two-year investigation by FBI and BLM agents code-named "Cerberus Action" in which an undercover agent was able to purchase 256 artifacts for $335,685. One indicted resident, Dr. James DeMar Redd, died by suicide on June 11. The undercover informant, Ted Gardiner, died by suicide on March 1, 2010.

== Demographics ==
Historical population
Census	Pop.	Note	%±
1910	385		—
1920	1,072		178.4%
1930	1,001		−6.6%
1940	1,438		43.7%
1950	1,177		−18.2%
1960	1,805		53.4%
1970	2,250		24.7%
1980	3,118		38.6%
1990	3,162		1.4%
2000	3,162		0.0%
2010	3,375		6.7%
2020	3,394		0.6%
U.S. Decennial Census

=== 2020 census ===
As of the 2020 census, Blanding had a population of 3,394. The median age was 29.0 years. 32.7% of residents were under the age of 18 and 12.8% of residents were 65 years of age or older. For every 100 females there were 91.9 males, and for every 100 females age 18 and over there were 87.8 males age 18 and over.

0.0% of residents lived in urban areas, while 100.0% lived in rural areas.

There were 1,035 households in Blanding, of which 46.9% had children under the age of 18 living in them. Of all households, 54.7% were married-couple households, 12.9% were households with a male householder and no spouse or partner present, and 27.3% were households with a female householder and no spouse or partner present. About 20.5% of all households were made up of individuals and 9.9% had someone living alone who was 65 years of age or older.

There were 1,147 housing units, of which 9.8% were vacant. The homeowner vacancy rate was 1.0% and the rental vacancy rate was 8.7%.

Racial composition as of the 2020 census
Race	Number	Percent
White	2,064	60.8%
Black or African American	17	0.5%
American Indian and Alaska Native	1,020	30.1%
Asian	9	0.3%
Native Hawaiian and Other Pacific Islander	36	1.1%
Some other race	59	1.7%
Two or more races	189	5.6%
Hispanic or Latino (of any race)	212	6.2%

=== 2010 census ===
As of the 2010 census of 2010, there were 3,375 people, 1,013 households, and 785 families residing in the city. The population density was 1,332.7 people per square mile (515.1/km^{2}). There were 1,110 housing units at an average density of 417.7 per square mile (161.4/km^{2}). The racial makeup of the city was 66.1% White, 0.3% African American, 29.4% Native American, 0.09% Asian, 0.01% Pacific Islander, .5% from other races, and 3.3% from two or more races. Hispanic or Latino of any race were 3.8% of the population.

There were 1,013 households, out of which 43.2% had children under the age of 18 living with them, 59% were married couples living together, 14.3% had a female householder with no husband present, and 22.5% were non-families. 20.4% of all households were made up of individuals, and 8.8% had someone living alone who was 65 years of age or older. The average household size was 3.19, and the average family size was 3.71.

In the city, the population was spread out, with 39.2% under the age of 19, 9.87% from 20 to 24, 22% from 25 to 44, 18.8% from 45 to 64, and 11.2% who were 65 years of age or older. The median age was 26.6 years. For every 100 females, there were 95.3 males. For every 100 females aged 18 and over, there were 88.3 males.

The median income for a household in the city was $43,946, and the median income for a family was $50,833. Males had a median income of $42,667 versus $21,615 for females. About 14.1% of families and 11.1% of the population were below the poverty line, including 34.0% of those under age 18 and 10.9% of those aged 65 or over.

== Education ==
The San Juan School District operates Blanding Elementary School, Albert R. Lyman Middle School, and San Juan High School in Blanding.

Utah State University has a campus in Blanding.

== Geography ==
Blanding is located in the Four Corners area of the Colorado Plateau.

According to the United States Census Bureau, the city has a total area of 2.4 square miles (6.1 km^{2}), all land.

=== Climate ===
According to the Köppen Climate Classification system, Blanding has a cold semi-arid climate, abbreviated "BSk" on climate maps. The hottest temperature recorded in Blanding was 110 °F (43.3 °C) on June 22, 1905, while the coldest temperature recorded was −23 °F (−30.6 °C) on February 8, 1933.

Climate data for Blanding, Utah, 1991–2020 normals, extremes 1904–present
Month	Jan	Feb	Mar	Apr	May	Jun	Jul	Aug	Sep	Oct	Nov	Dec	Year
Record high °F (°C)	63 (17)	74 (23)	86 (30)	88 (31)	98 (37)	110 (43)	109 (43)	106 (41)	100 (38)	99 (37)	79 (26)	65 (18)	110 (43)
Mean maximum °F (°C)	52.6 (11.4)	58.5 (14.7)	70.1 (21.2)	78.5 (25.8)	87.7 (30.9)	95.9 (35.5)	98.9 (37.2)	95.1 (35.1)	90.2 (32.3)	79.8 (26.6)	66.1 (18.9)	53.8 (12.1)	99.3 (37.4)
Mean daily maximum °F (°C)	39.6 (4.2)	44.6 (7.0)	54.6 (12.6)	62.2 (16.8)	72.5 (22.5)	84.4 (29.1)	88.8 (31.6)	85.9 (29.9)	78.0 (25.6)	64.6 (18.1)	50.7 (10.4)	39.7 (4.3)	63.8 (17.7)
Daily mean °F (°C)	31.0 (−0.6)	35.4 (1.9)	43.6 (6.4)	49.9 (9.9)	59.3 (15.2)	70.1 (21.2)	75.5 (24.2)	73.2 (22.9)	65.5 (18.6)	53.1 (11.7)	40.8 (4.9)	31.2 (−0.4)	52.4 (11.3)
Mean daily minimum °F (°C)	22.3 (−5.4)	26.3 (−3.2)	32.5 (0.3)	37.6 (3.1)	46.2 (7.9)	55.9 (13.3)	62.1 (16.7)	60.4 (15.8)	53.0 (11.7)	41.7 (5.4)	30.8 (−0.7)	22.7 (−5.2)	41.0 (5.0)
Mean minimum °F (°C)	8.1 (−13.3)	12.4 (−10.9)	19.5 (−6.9)	24.7 (−4.1)	32.6 (0.3)	42.9 (6.1)	55.0 (12.8)	53.0 (11.7)	40.3 (4.6)	27.0 (−2.8)	16.1 (−8.8)	7.8 (−13.4)	4.8 (−15.1)
Record low °F (°C)	−20 (−29)	−23 (−31)	−3 (−19)	10 (−12)	14 (−10)	28 (−2)	32 (0)	38 (3)	20 (−7)	10 (−12)	−7 (−22)	−13 (−25)	−23 (−31)
Average precipitation inches (mm)	1.56 (40)	1.33 (34)	0.96 (24)	0.76 (19)	0.79 (20)	0.34 (8.6)	1.06 (27)	1.21 (31)	1.29 (33)	1.41 (36)	0.92 (23)	1.26 (32)	12.89 (327.6)
Average snowfall inches (cm)	11.2 (28)	7.8 (20)	3.6 (9.1)	2.1 (5.3)	0.1 (0.25)	0.0 (0.0)	0.0 (0.0)	0.0 (0.0)	0.0 (0.0)	0.6 (1.5)	3.3 (8.4)	9.4 (24)	38.1 (96.55)
Average precipitation days (≥ 0.01 in)	6.3	6.6	5.4	5.1	5.4	2.7	7.0	8.0	6.2	5.4	4.2	6.1	68.4
Average snowy days (≥ 0.1 in)	3.9	3.2	1.5	0.9	0.1	0.0	0.0	0.0	0.0	0.3	1.4	3.1	14.4
Source 1: NOAA
Source 2: National Weather Service

== Notable people ==
- Ron Dewar (1941–2024) – jazz musician
- Albert R. Lyman (1880–1973) – writer, pioneer, and early settler of Blanding
- Phil Lyman – Utah House of Representatives member
- Logan Monson – Utah House of Representatives member and mayor
- Buu Nygren (b. 1986) – president of the Navajo Nation
- DeVan L. Shumway (1930–2008) – publisher, spokesman for the Committee for the Re-Election of the President, and aide to Richard Nixon

== Gallery ==
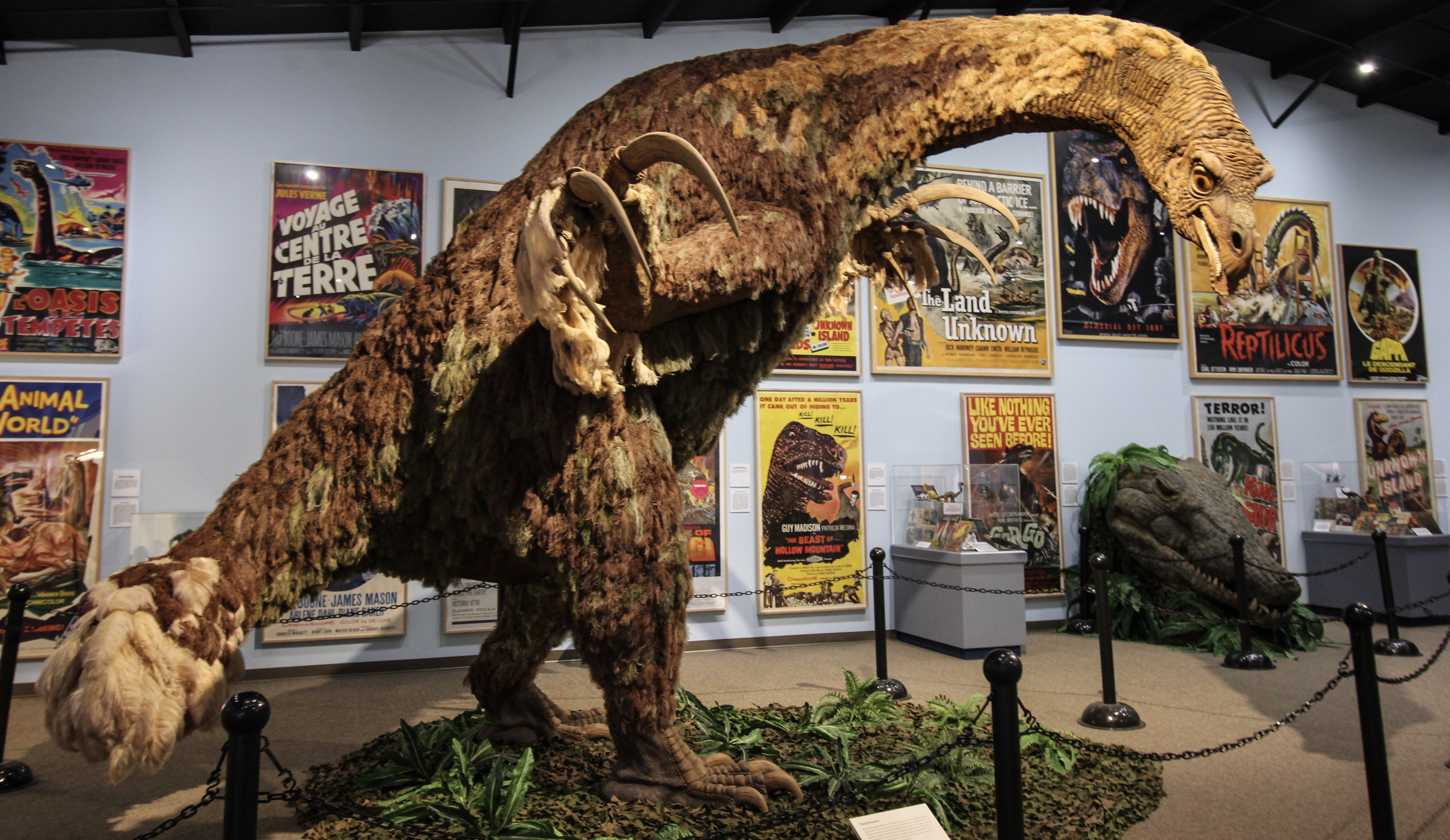
Exhibit in the dinosaur museum, Blanding, Utah taken 2019

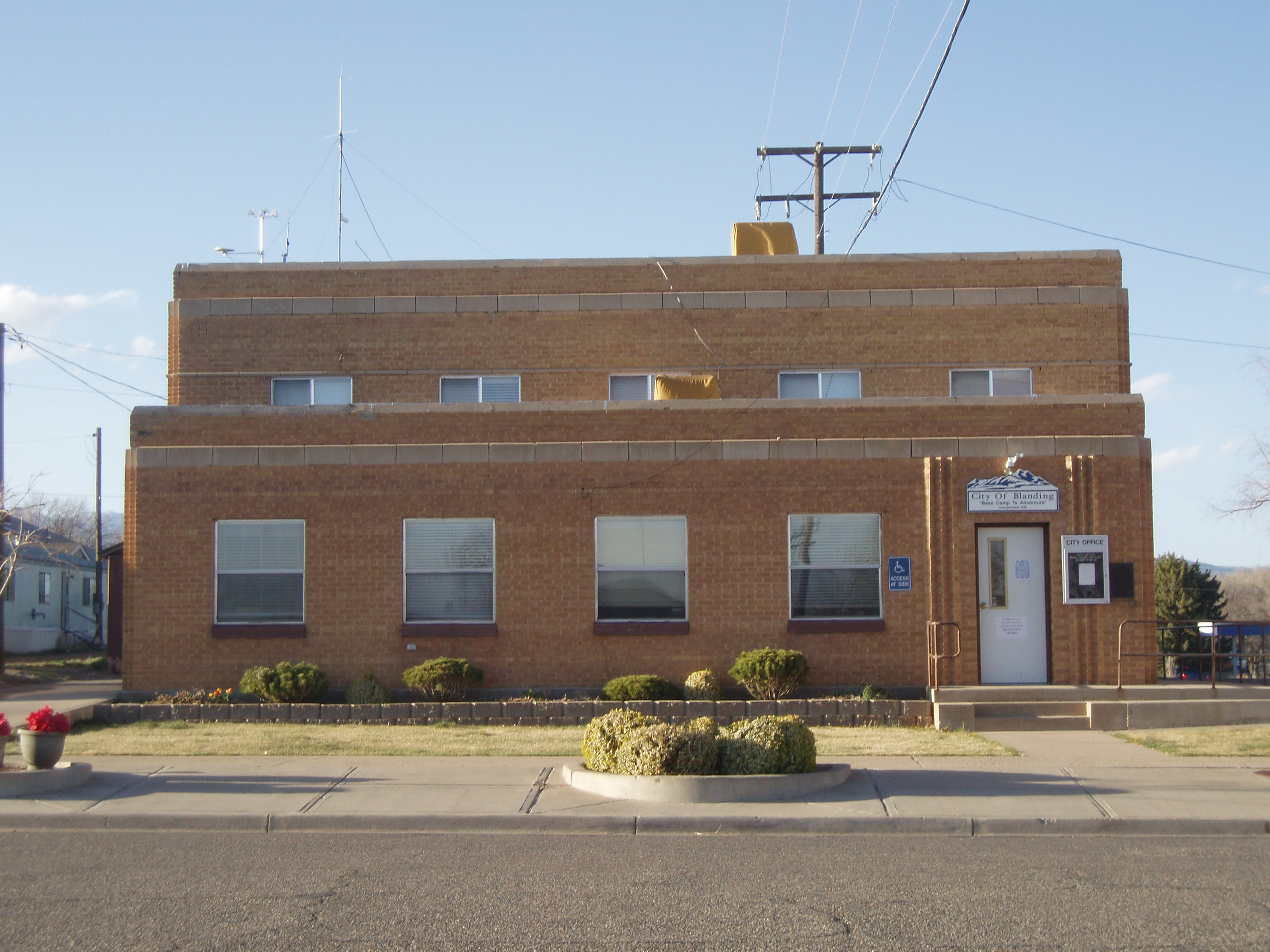
City office of Blanding, Utah, taken 2009

== See also ==
- List of municipalities in Utah

Community

- Arizona breccia pipe uranium mineralization
- Blanding Municipal Airport
- KBDX
- Swallow's Nest (Blanding, Utah)

Geographically

- Abajo Mountains
- Bears Ears National Monument
- Colorado Plateau
- Four Corners
- Hovenweep National Monument

Roadways

- U.S. Route 191 in Utah
- Utah State Route 95
- Utah State Route 262
