= Rezball =

Native American version of basketball

- A group of people playing rezball
- Nicknames: Rez Ball, reservation ball, American Indian basketball
- First played: 18th to 19th century

Characteristics
- Contact: Yes
- Team members: 10-15 per side
- Mixed-sex: Yes, but usually in separate leagues/divisions
- Equipment: Basketball

Presence
- Country or region: Four Corners region
- Olympic: No

Rezball, (sometimes referred to as Rez Ball or American Indian basketball) short for reservation ball, is a style of basketball associated with Native Americans. It is particularly known at the high school level in the Southwestern United States. As rezball has grown, there has been greater attention to how native indigenous communities are both positively and negatively impacted by the sport of rezball, such as that of suicide rates, alcohol abuse, and the challenge assimilating into the culture outside of reservations.

== Description ==
Rezball is transition-based basketball style that forces tempo with aggressive play, quick scoring (or shooting), and an assertive defense that looks to force turnovers through pressing or half-court traps. There are slight variations from program to program.

Many Native Americans learned how to play basketball while they were held in boarding schools by the Bureau of Indian Affairs (BIA). They incorporated running, quick passing and fast scoring to create the modern style of rezball. Rezball provided an opportunity for competition among Native Americans in reservations, as well as helping bring Native American communities together by helping them overcome strife while on reservations.

== Origins ==
Native Americans were known to have played a sport similar to basketball, but they did not learn standard US game until they were placed in boarding schools by the BIA in the late 18th century or early 19th century.

== Importance for Native American communities ==
Rezball plays a major role in Native American culture. For most Native Americans, rezball/basketball in high school is the furthest they are able to go with competing in the sport at the amateur level, as most don't try to competitively play the sport past their high school years. For those who are able to continue to pursue playing the sport, many challenges are presented to them, such as that of getting used to life outside of the reservation and other social challenges such as turning to alcohol abuse.

== Schools and regions known for playing rezball ==
The Apache, Pueblo and Navajo tribes in northeastern Arizona and northwestern New Mexico are home to several high schools. In these areas, basketball is very important. In Arizona, three of the top six largest crowds at a boys' basketball game are rezball games (regardless of school size), with one of the two games tied for the highest-ever attendance being a game between Apache and Navajo schools.

Arizona's Native American largest high school arenas are; The Nash Center (Kayenta, AZ) seats 3,800, The Warrior Pavilion (Tuba City, AZ) seats 4,518, the Ganado Pavilion (Burnside, AZ) seats 5,500, The Wildcat Den (Chinle, AZ) seats 7,510, and the Bee Hółdzil Fighting Scouts Events Center (Fort Defiance, AZ) seats about 6,532. These massive arenas draw large crowds from all around the Navajo Reservation. The border town teams for Arizona that are within the AIA 3A Division are Winslow, Holbrook and Page — which consists mainly of Native Americans. Some other examples of the intense following of basketball in this region were noted in February 2013 by a writer for MaxPreps.com, the high school arm of CBSSports.com. First, early in the month, the Wildcat Den hosted an Arizona Interscholastic Association (AIA) sectional tournament featuring four boys' and four girls' reservation teams. Even though neither Chinle High team participated in the sectional, more than 12,000 attended over the two-day event, with hundreds of fans arriving hours before the doors opened to get the best seats. The scheduling of the AIA's state tournament later that month at the venue then known as Jobing.com Arena in Glendale, home to the NHL's Arizona Coyotes, also reflected rezball influence. In most states that host multiple state championship games at one site, the last game scheduled is the boys' championship game in the largest enrollment class. Here, however, the marquee slot was reserved for the girls' title game in Class 3A (the state's largest schools are in Class 5A)—a classification that has traditionally been dominated by reservation schools.

While the Native American basketball phenomenon is most pronounced in the Four Corners region, it is not limited to that area. For example, when the girls' team from the reservation high school of the Mississippi Band of Choctaw Indians reached the final of the Class 3A state tournament in 2017 (which they won), about 5,000 fans traveled from the reservation to Jackson for the game.

== High schools ==
Schools with rezball teams
School	City	State
Chinle High School	Chinle	Arizona
Cibecue High School	Cibecue	Arizona
Window Rock High School	Fort Defiance	Arizona
Fort Thomas High School	Fort Thomas	Arizona
Ganado High School	Ganado	Arizona
Holbrook High School	Holbrook	Arizona
Monument Valley High School	Kayenta	Arizona
Hopi Junior/Senior High School	Keams Canyon	Arizona
Many Farms High School	Many Farms	Arizona
River Valley High School	Mohave Valley	Arizona
Page High School	Page	Arizona
Piñon High School	Piñon	Arizona
Rock Point High School	Rock Point	Arizona
Rough Rock High School	Rough Rock	Arizona
St. Michael High School	St. Michaels	Arizona
San Carlos High School	San Carlos	Arizona
Valley High School	Sanders	Arizona
Salt River High School	Scottsdale	Arizona
Baboquivari High School	Sells	Arizona
Shonto Preparatory Technology High School	Shonto	Arizona
Red Mesa High School	Teec Nos Pos	Arizona
Greyhills Academy High School	Tuba City	Arizona
Tuba City High School	Tuba City	Arizona
Alchesay High School	Whiteriver	Arizona
Winslow High School	Winslow	Arizona
Sherman Indian High School	Riverside	California
Ignacio High School	Ignacio	Colorado
Native American Community Academy	Albuquerque	New Mexico
Aztec High School	Aztec	New Mexico
Bloomfield High School	Bloomfield	New Mexico
Crownpoint High School	Crownpoint	New Mexico
Dulce High School	Dulce	New Mexico
Farmington High School	Farmington	New Mexico
Navajo Prep High School	Farmington	New Mexico
Piedra Vista High School	Farmington	New Mexico
Wingate High School	Fort Wingate	New Mexico
Gallup High School	Gallup	New Mexico
Miyamura High School	Gallup	New Mexico
Jemez Valley High School	Jemez Pueblo	New Mexico
Kirtland Central High School	Kirtland	New Mexico
Laguna–Acoma High School	Laguna	New Mexico
Magdalena High School	Magdalena	New Mexico
Navajo Pine High School	Navajo	New Mexico
Newcomb High School	Newcomb	New Mexico
Pine Hill High School	Pinehill	New Mexico
Ramah High School	Ramah	New Mexico
Rehoboth High School	Rehoboth	New Mexico
Santa Fe Indian High School	Santa Fe	New Mexico
Shiprock High School	Shiprock	New Mexico
Shiprock Northwest High School	Shiprock	New Mexico
Tsé Yí Gai High School	Smith Lake	New Mexico
Thoreau High School	Thoreau	New Mexico
Tohatchi High School	Tohatchi	New Mexico
Zuni High School	Zuni	New Mexico
Cherokee High School	Cherokee	North Carolina
Uintah River High School	Duchesne	Utah
Whitehorse High School	Montezuma Creek	Utah
Monument Valley High School	Monument Valley	Utah
Navajo Mountain High School	Navajo Mountain	Utah
Wyoming Indian High School	Ethete	Wyoming

== Native American Basketball Invitational (NABI) ==
Every year the NABI Foundation hosts the Native American Basketball Invitational (NABI) in Arizona. It is instrumental in showcasing the talent of the players to college recruiters, most of whom would not travel to the remote reservation towns to recruit. Additionally, NABI gives a total of about $30,000 in scholarships to players each year.

The tournament hosts 128+ teams from all over the U.S., Canada and New Zealand. In 2025, it set a new record with 202 teams competing. From 2007 to 2022, it was an all-native tournament sponsored by Nike N7, many Native American tribes, the Phoenix Suns organization and Phoenix Mercury organization.

NABI was co-founded in 2003 by Mark West of the Phoenix Suns, the late Scott Podleski of the Arizona Rattlers and GinaMarie Scarpa, former Executive Director of the A. C. Green Youth Foundation (named for A. C. Green, the NBA Iron Man).

NABI made history in 2007 as the first all-Native tournament sanctioned by the NCAA, after NABI Foundation President & CEO GinaMarie Scarpa insisted the NCAA respect Tribal Sovereignty and exempt the tournament from complying with their "same-state rule".

== In popular culture ==
Rezball is featured in the 2024 Netflix sports drama film, Rez Ball. The film is based on the 2019 nonfiction book Canyon Dreams: A Basketball Season on the Navajo Nation by journalist Michael Powell.
