= Carley Garner =

American commodity trader

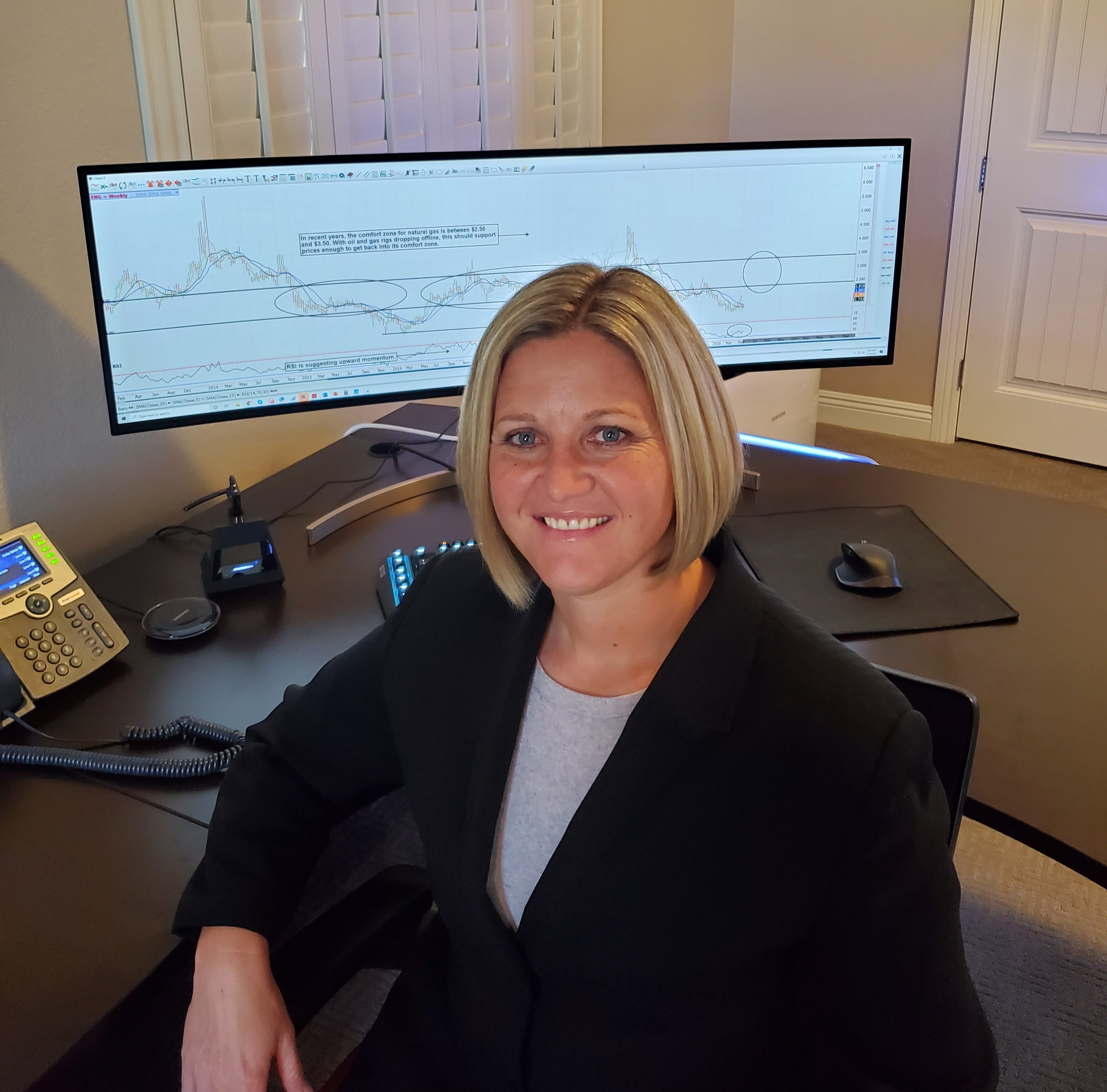
- Futures and options broker
- Born: December 6, 1977 (age 48)
- Education: Monticello High School; Snow College; University of Nevada, Las Vegas
- Occupations: Commodity market strategist and broker
- Notable work: Trading Commodity Options with Creativity,Higher Probability Commodity Trading, and A Trader's First Book on Commodities published by Wyatt-MacKenzie and DT Publishing.

Carley Garner (born 1977) is an American commodity market strategist and futures and options broker and the author of Trading Commodity Options with Creativity, Higher Probability Commodity Trading, and A Trader's First Book on Commodities, published by DT publishing an imprint of Wyatt-MacKenzie. She has also previously written four books published by FT Press, Currency Trading in the FOREX and Futures Markets, A Trader's First Book on Commodities (two editions), and Commodity Options. Commodity Options was named one of the "Top 10 Investing & Trading Books of 2009" by SFO Magazine. A Trader's First Book on Commodities (2nd Ed.) was named as the best futures trading book in 2021 by a UK financial education website. Garner was also featured in FT Press' e-book series entitled "Insights for the Agile Investor", and an educational video series. Carley can also be found at TradersEXPOs and MoneyShows throughout the country.

Garner is a contributor to the Mad Money television show hosted by Jim Cramer on CNBC. She is also a guest on Bloomberg Television's Options Insight segment with Abigail Doolittle. and appears weekly on RFD-TV's Cow Guy Close with Scott Shellady. Garner also writes content for RealMoney, the premium service of TheStreet.com.

She has appeared in Technical Analysis of Stocks & Commodities magazine as a monthly columnist since early 2008 and is a RealMoney.com contributor to TheStreet.com.

== Early life ==
After Garner graduated from Monticello High School in Monticello, Utah in 1996, she attended Snow College where she earned an associate's degree. In 2003, she graduated from the University of Nevada, Las Vegas with bachelor's degrees in accounting and finance with Magna Cum Laude accolades.

== Career ==
During her time in the commodity industry, Garner has been an active member of the financial media. Along with regular television appearances, she has participated in several radio interviews and is often quoted and referenced in business news publications such as The Wall Street Journal and monthly print publications such as Futures Magazine. In addition to a monthly column in Stocks & Commodities Magazine, her work is also published in multiple national magazines and on several industry trading education websites, including TheStreet.com, Barchart.com, and many others.

Garner's chart analysis is featured on the Mad Money TV show on CNBC. On the show, Jim Cramer discusses the commodity market analysis of Garner on markets such as gold, crude oil, natural gas, and Treasuries.

Garner appears on RFD-TV's Cow Guy Close program hosted by Scott Shellady every Wednesday afternoon to discuss current events in the commodity and financial markets. She also joins the Market Day Report on the same network each Friday to discuss grain market fundamentals and news.

Garner has appeared on various programs on Bloomberg Television, mostly offering opinions on the crude oil market, but is most regular on Options Insight with Abigail Doolittle. In the segments, Garner discusses the current market environment and offers an option strategy to viewers that might make sense given the circumstances.

Although Garner is most known for her published efforts, she has become a regular on the speaking circuit and also performs online seminars, known as webinars, for various futures industry cyber venues including online classes for the New York Institute of Finance, BigMikeTrading.com, MoneyShow.com, and others.

Garner began her career as a commodity broker in the Las Vegas branch of Alaron Trading in March 2004. By 2006 she was named as a branch manager and a senior analyst. In the fall of 2008, Garner ventured away from Alaron and began working for a guaranteed introducing broker for PFGBest.com, DeCarley Trading LLC also located in Las Vegas, Nevada. In July 2012, DeCarley Trading joined the Zaner Group to become an independent introducing broker;.DeCarley Trading is currently operating as a branch of the Zaner Group. At DeCarley Trading, Garner is a senior strategist and head commodity broker where she writes daily and monthly market newsletters for the firm's clients as well as facilitates trading and contract execution.

== Bibliography ==
- 2020: Trading Commodity Options with Creativity. – ISBN 978-1948018906
- 2017: A Trader's First Book on Commodities, Third Edition: Everything you Need to Know about Futures and Options Trading before Placing a Trade. – ISBN 978-1948018005
- 2016: Higher Probability Commodity Trading. – ISBN 9781942545521
- 2012: Currency Trading in the Forex and Futures Markets. – ISBN 0132931370
- 2012: A Trader's First Book on Commodities: An Introduction to the World's Fastest Growing Market, Second Edition. – ISBN 013324783X
- 2010: A Trader's First Book on Commodities: An introduction to the World's Fastest Growing Market, First Edition. – ISBN 0137015453
- 2009: Commodity Options: Trading and Hedging Volatility in the World's Most Lucrative Market. – ISBN 0137142862
