= Eastland, Utah =

Unincorporated community in the state of Utah, United States

- Unincorporated community
- Location within Utah Location within the United States
- Coordinates: 37°48′13″N 109°08′02″W
- Country: United States
- State: Utah
- County: San Juan
- Elevation: 6,886 ft (2,099 m)
- Time zone: UTC-7 (Mountain (MST))
  - Summer (DST): UTC-6 (MDT)
- Area code: 435
- GNIS feature ID: 1427737

Eastland is an unincorporated community in San Juan County, Utah, United States. The community is near U.S. Route 491 and 12.3 miles (19.8 km) east-southeast of Monticello.
