= Penstemon navajoa =

Conservation status
- Critically Imperiled (NatureServe)

Scientific classification
- Kingdom: Plantae
- Clade: Tracheophytes
- Clade: Angiosperms
- Clade: Eudicots
- Clade: Asterids
- Order: Lamiales
- Family: Plantaginaceae
- Genus: Penstemon
- Species: P. navajoa

Binomial name
- Penstemon navajoa N.Holmgren

Species of flowering plant

Penstemon navajoa is a rare species of flowering plant in the plantain family known by the common name Navajo Mountain beardtongue, or Navajo beardtongue. It is endemic to Utah in the United States, where it is known only from San Juan County.

This perennial herb reaches 20 to 40 centimeters in maximum height. It produces blue flowers with white beards, blooming taking place in July and August. It grows in open areas in coniferous forest habitat.

There are only five known occurrences of this plant, mainly high on Navajo Mountain within the Navajo Nation. It may face threats from wildfire and firefighting efforts.
