= San Juan School District =

School district in Utah, United States

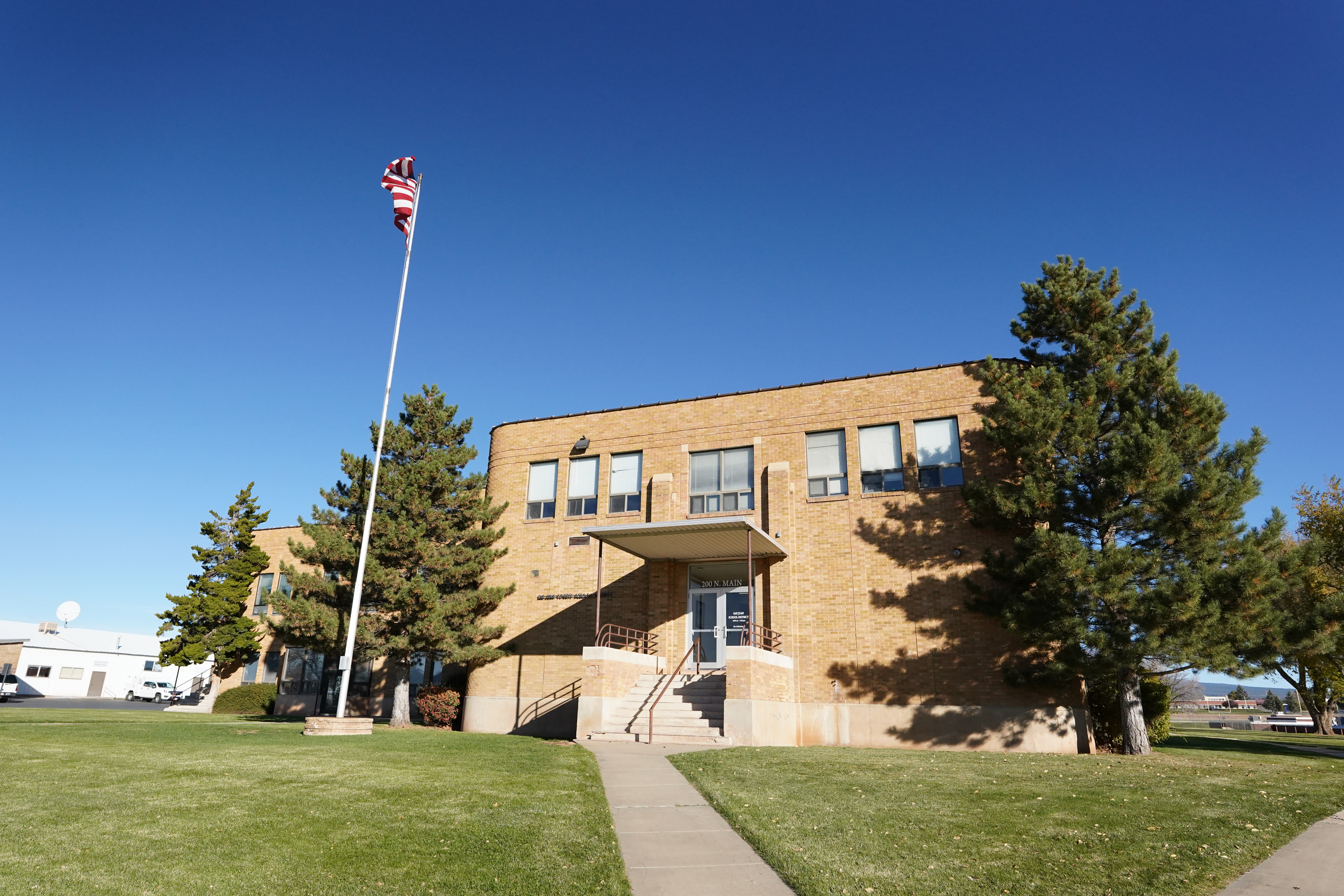

Address
- 200 North Main Street, Blanding San Juan County, Utah United States

District information
- Type: Public
- Superintendent: Ron T. Nielson
- Budget: 38.5 million USD (2018)
- NCES District ID: 4900900

Other information
- Website: https://sjsd.org/

San Juan School District (SJSD) is a school district headquartered in Blanding, Utah, United States.

The district has twelve schools. As of 2023, 3,017 students were enrolled into the district.

== History ==
As of 2017 teachers in communities of the southern part of the school district (the Bluff, Montezuma Creek, and Oljato–Monument Valley areas) tend to have less experience than those in the northern part of the school district (Blanding, La Sal, and Monticello); about 50% of the teachers to the north have 14 or more years of experience while 7% of teachers in the southern communities have that experience.

== Schools ==
7-12 schools:

- Monticello High School - Monticello
- Monument Valley High School - Oljato–Monument Valley (Unincorporated area)
- San Juan High School - Blanding
- Whitehorse High School - Unincorporated area adjacent to Montezuma Creek

High schools (9-12):

- Navajo Mountain High School - Navajo Mountain (Unincorporated area)

Middle schools (7-8):

- Albert R. Lyman Middle School - Blanding (supports 6th grade)

K-6 schools:

- Montezuma Creek Elementary School - Aneth (Unincorporated area)
  - In 2017 the school offered to give salaries of $80,000 to teachers with many years of experience who are designated as lead teachers.
- Monticello Elementary School - Monticello
- Tsé'bii'nidzisgai Elementary School - Oljato–Monument Valley (Unincorporated area)

1-5 schools:

- Blanding Elementary School - Blanding
- Bluff Elementary School - Bluff (Unincorporated area)

1-3 schools:

- La Sal Elementary School - La Sal (Unincorporated area)

== See also ==
- List of school districts in Utah
