= Monument Valley High School (Utah) =

High school in Utah, USA

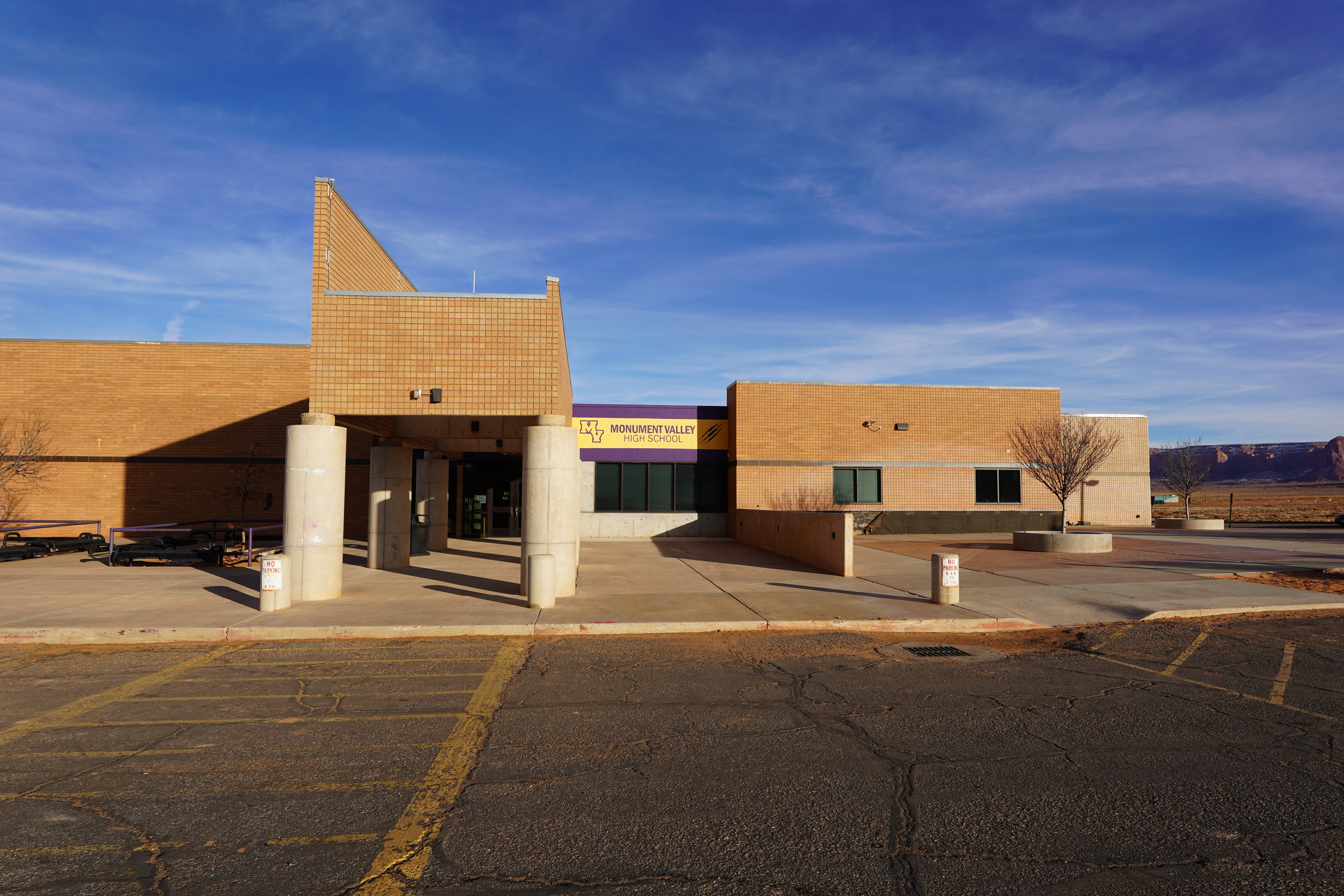

Location
- 100 North Cougar Lane; Monument Valley, (San Juan County), Utah 84536; United States; 37°0′18.11″N 110°10′40.78″W

Information
- School type: Public, high school
- NCES School ID: 490090000802
- Principal: Don Gandy
- Teaching staff: 13.70 (FTE)
- Grades: 7–12
- Enrollment: 197 (2023-2024)
- Student to teacher ratio: 14.38
- Colors: Purple and gold
- Team name: Cougars
- Website: www.sjsd.org/o/mvhs

Monument Valley High School is located in Oljato-Monument Valley, Utah. The school is in the San Juan School District, and serves grades 7–12.
