= Navajo Mountain High School =

High school in Navajo Mountain, Utah, United States

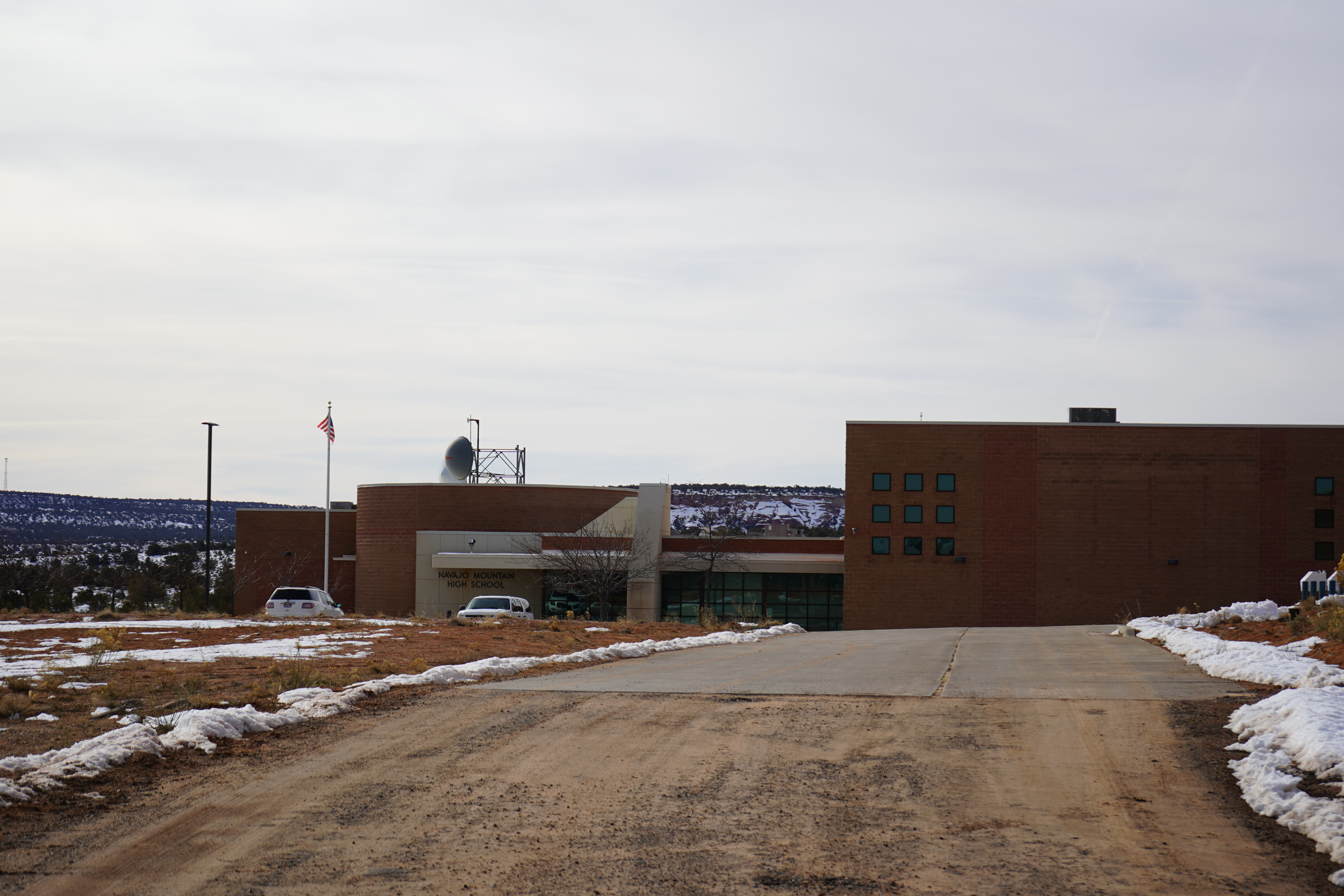
- Navajo High School, January 2019

Location
- RESERVATION RD #16; Navajo Mountain, Utah 84510; United States; 37°03′35″N 110°46′48″W

Information
- School type: Public, high school
- NCES School ID: 490090000491
- Teaching staff: 4.98 (FTE)
- Grades: 9-12
- Enrollment: 24 (2024-2025)
- Student to teacher ratio: 4.82
- Colors: Navy, white and silver
- Mascot: Jaguars
- Website: www.sjsd.org/o/nmhs

Navajo Mountain High School is a senior high school in Navajo Mountain, Utah, United States, a census-designated place within the Navajo Nation in southwestern San Juan County.

== Description ==
The school, a part of the San Juan School District, uses an Arizona mailing address. It is located in a low income area 35 miles (56 km) away from the closest gas station; the Navajo Mountain Chapter stated that Navajo Mountain is the most isolated community in the entire Navajo Nation.

== History ==
The number of staff declined after the Great Recession of 2008 even though the student body increased slightly; there were seven full-time staff members in 2009, while in 2014 there were three full-time staff members and a part-time counselor.

In 2017 the school formed a FIRST Robotics Competition team and qualified for the FIRST Championship in Houston, Texas.

The school was prominently featured in the 2021 Independent Lens documentary Scenes From The Glittering World.

== Student body and staff ==
As of 2014 the entire student body was Native American. Most of the 33 students were entirely of Navajo ancestry. A portion of the student body was made up of some who were entirely of Paiute ancestry. Some students had mixed ancestry of Navajo and Hopi and others had mixed ancestry of Navajo and Paiute. Around 33% of the students were classified as homeless, and 31 of the 33 students were enrolled in free or reduced lunch programs.

As of that year, one staff member was both an administrator and a teacher, and there were two other teachers who worked full-time as well as a part-time counselor. In 2009 all of the school staff were full-time: one principal, one counselor, and five teachers.

== See also ==
- List of high schools in Utah
