= Hyland Hotel (Monticello, Utah) =

- U.S. National Register of Historic Places
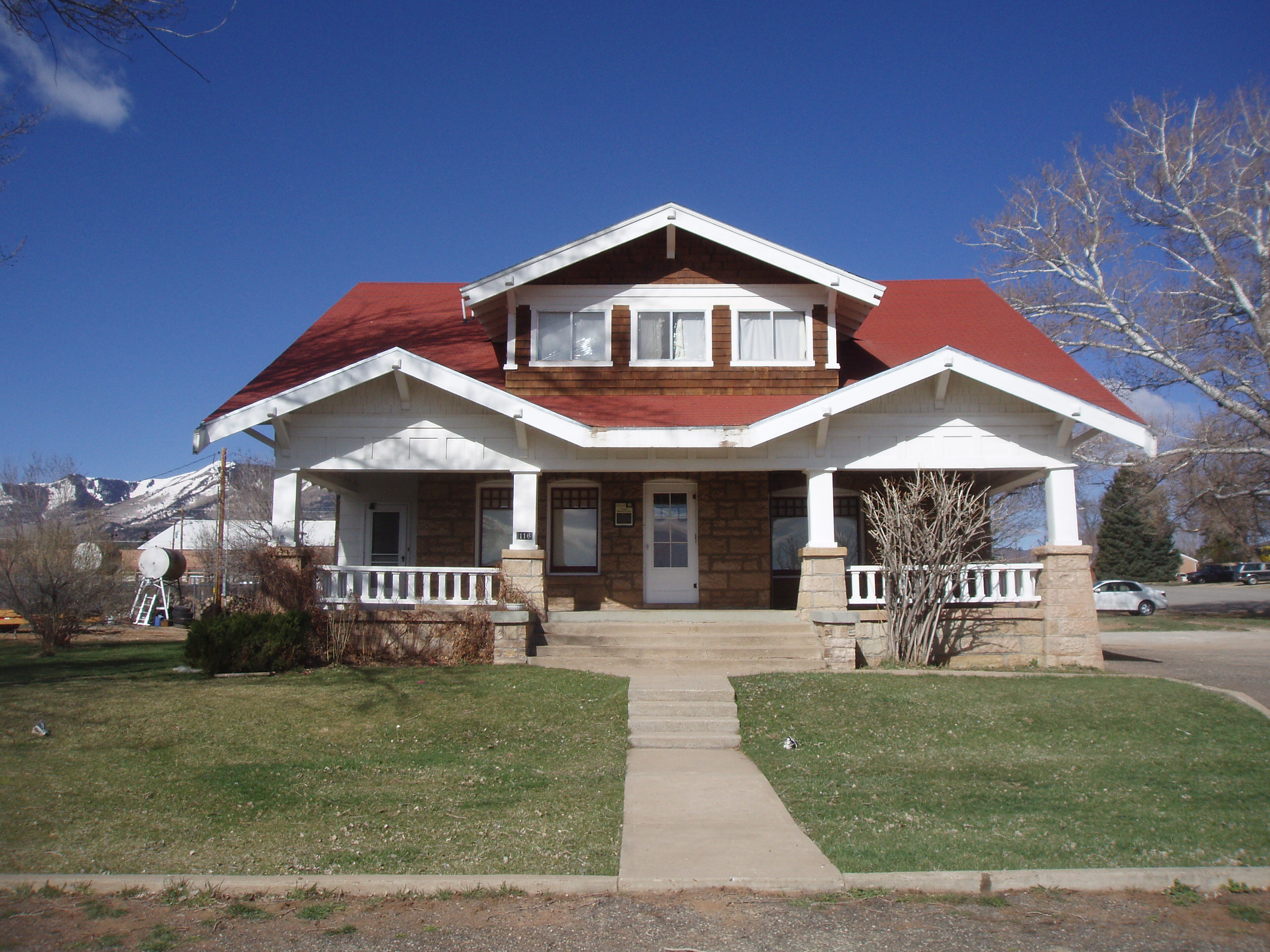

- Location within Utah Location within the United States
- Location: 116 S. 100 West, Monticello, Utah
- Coordinates: 37°52′15.3″N 109°20′42.7″W
- Built: 1918
- Architect: Wood, Joseph Henry; Thompson, Ed
- Architectural style: Bungalow/American craftsman
- NRHP reference No.: 94000785
- Added to NRHP: July 28, 1994

The Hyland Hotel in Monticello, Utah, also known as the Wood/Summers House, was built between 1916 and 1918 by Joseph Henry Wood as a single-family residence. In 1924 the bungalow was adapted for use as a hotel with the conversion of the house's four upstairs bedrooms to nine guest rooms.

The foundation and first floor of the two story Craftsman Style house are of local sandstone from South Creek near the Abajo Mountains, while the upper level is wood frame with shingle siding. The house features the characteristic wide porches, deep eaves and shallow roof pitch associated with the Craftsman style. The house retains its original first floor arrangement with two parlors, a small office at the front entrance, a bedroom and a kitchen. The interior retains its dark-stained California fir woodwork. Three bathrooms were added to the original two with the house's conversion. The property originally included barns, sheds, a dairy, an ice house, orchard and garden, all no longer extant.

In 1924 the house was purchased by Fletcher Hammond, moving his wife and seven children into the house and remodeling the upstairs. Hammond sold the house in 1933 to his son-in-law, Jack Nielson, who operated the hotel and dairy. Nielson sold the property in 1936 to Kenneth and Elizabeth Summers. The Summers operated the hotel until 1974.

The Hyland Hotel was listed on the National Register of Historic Places in 1994.
