= The Hideout Golf Club =

Public golf course in Monticello, Utah

Coordinates: 37°51′39″N 109°20′38″W

The Hideout Golf Club is a public golf course in Monticello, Utah. Golfweek has rated it the "#24 Municipal Course in America". It was opened in 2002 after completion in 2001 by Forrest Richardson. Of note is the fact that the course was built as part of a major reclamation project involving the former site of a uranium mine and mill, dismantled in the 1960s by the United States Department of Energy. The only directive of the Department was that the reclaimed land be vegetated and protected from erosion, and a golf course fit that bill. The Hideout Golf Club occupies land across from the former mill, with the work to build the course involving restoration of the old mill site land into a natural, open space park.
