= Lariat Cafe explosion =

Coordinates: 37.8727°N 109.3402°W

- Date: August 13, 1956; 69 years ago
- Location: Monticello, Utah, U.S.
- Deaths: 16
- Injuries: 30

The Lariat Cafe explosion was a natural gas explosion at a cafe in Monticello, Utah on 13 August 1956. The blast killed 16 people and injured another 30.

== History ==
The disaster took place at the Lariat Cafe in the town of Monticello, Utah. At the time, the town was undergoing a massive construction boom caused by the discovery of lucrative uranium deposits in the nearby mountains; fueled by the mining boom, many new structures were built in the years preceding the explosion, including the Lariat Cafe itself, which was built out of brick and cinder-block in 1955. The cafe was supplied with propane.

Located in Monticello's business district, the Lariat cafe was conducting business as usual on Monday, 13 August. The cafe's owner had recently agreed to switch the cafe from propane/butane gas to natural gas provided by the Utah Gas Service Co. - workmen from the company had successfully connected the town's natural gas main to the cafe the day before, thus making the older propane line obsolete. However, either a miscommunication or negligence caused the workmen to leave the cafe's old propane line open. As a result, propane gas gradually filled the cafe's basement and walls over the course of the day. At around 7 p.m on Monday evening, while the cafe was filled with between 50-70 patrons, some source ignited the built-up gas, causing the building to explode and collapse. Patrons were thrown up into the area, with some being violently dashed against flying pieces of the building. Others were severely injured or killed by the concussive force of the explosion. One victim noted that the cafe had been crumpled "like an egg shell". The blast also destroyed windows within a one-block radius of the cafe.

Rescue services arrived at the scene of the disaster within minutes, where they were aided by hundreds of townspeople. More seriously injured victims were driven to Salt Lake City, though several died in transit. In all, 16 people were killed and over 30 were wounded.

The disaster led to a protracted legal battle in which the cafe owner and Utah Gas Service accused each other of negligence. The legal dispute eventually reached the Utah Supreme Court in 1960, with the court deciding against Utah Gas Service Co. The court opinion stated that, while the owner of the cafe had been negligent by letting patrons inside an unsafe building, it had been Utah Gas Service Co.'s desire to sell gas to the cafe that had precipitated the disaster.
