= Navajo Mountain =

Landform in Utah and Arizona, United States

- Navajo: Naatsisʼáán
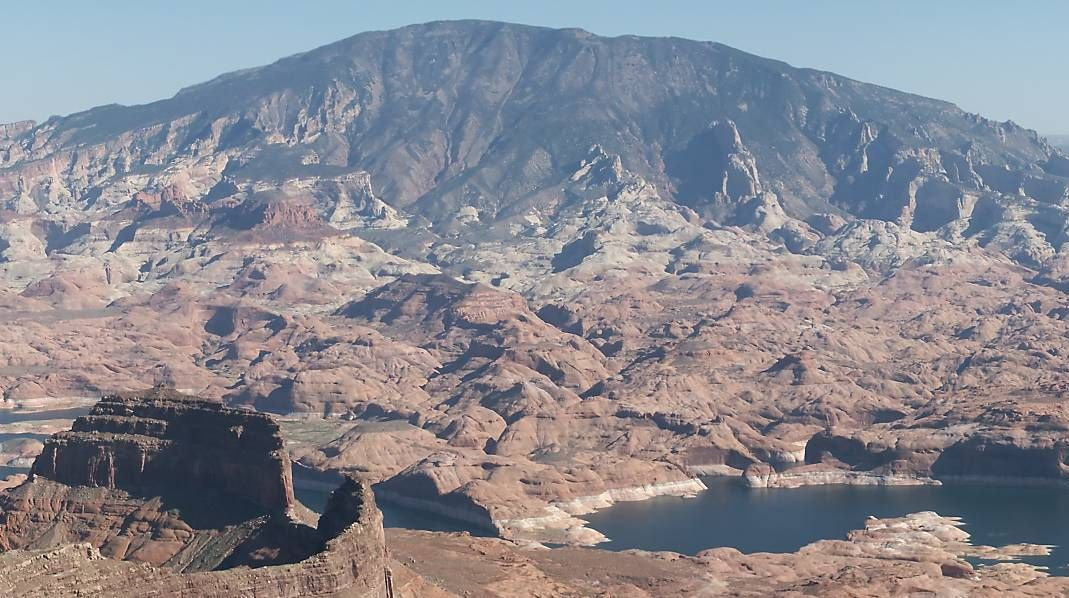
- Navajo Mountain and Lake Powell, looking southeast from the Kaiparowits Plateau

Highest point
- Elevation: 10,348 ft (3,154 m) NAVD 88
- Prominence: 4,226 ft (1,288 m)
- Listing: Mountain peaks of Utah
- Coordinates: 37°02′03″N 110°52′10″W

Geography
- Location within Utah Location within Arizona
- Location: San Juan, County, Utah, U.S.; Coconino County, Arizona, U.S.
- Topo map: USGS Navajo Begay

Geology
- Mountain type: Laccolith

Climbing
- Easiest route: Radio Towers Road

Navajo Mountain (Navajo: Naatsisʼáán meaning "Earth Head") is a peak in San Juan County, Utah, with its southern flank extending into Coconino County, Arizona, in the United States. It holds an important place in the traditions of three local Native American tribes. The summit is the highest point on the Navajo Nation.

== Geologic history ==
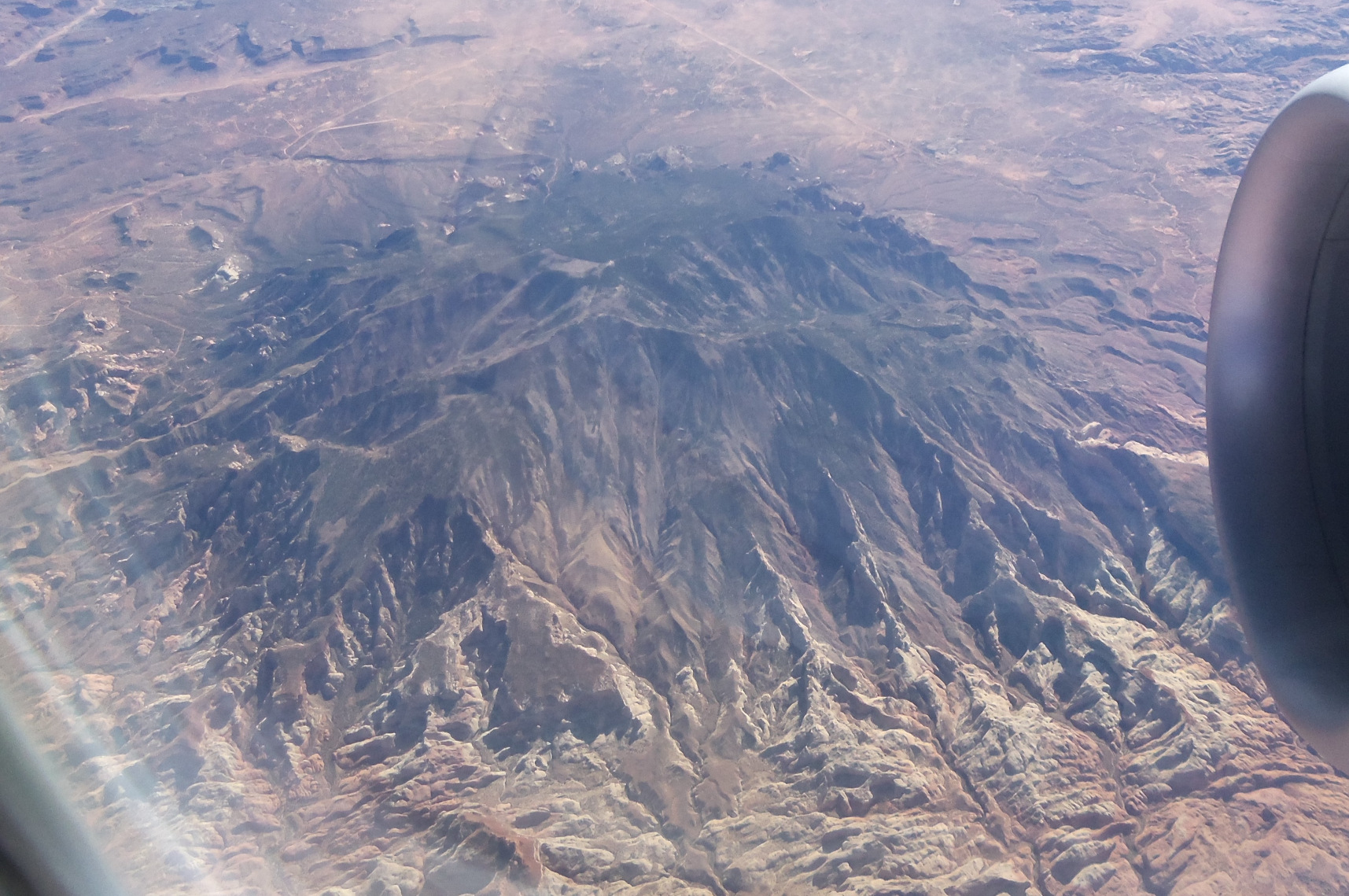
Air photo of Navajo Mountain, October 2020

Navajo Mountain is a prominent free-standing laccolith, a dome-shaped body of igneous rock that intruded into sedimentary layers and lifted up the overlying layer. The igneous rock at the core of the mountain is wrapped in sedimentary layers. Such igneous intrusions have been exposed by erosion and well studied in similar mountain ranges on the Colorado Plateau, such as the Henry Mountains, the Abajo Mountains, and the La Sal Range.

The Colorado Plateau is made of mostly flat-lying layers of sedimentary rock that record paleoclimate extremes ranging from oceans to widespread deserts over the last 1.8 billion years. The peak of Navajo Mountain, at approximately 10,388 feet (3,166 m), is made up of uplifted Dakota Sandstone deposited during the Cretaceous Period (approximately 66-138 million years ago). Other formations exposed on the surface of the mountain include the Jurassic sequence of the Morrison Formation, Entrada Sandstone, Carmel Formation, and Navajo Sandstone.

== Cultural history ==
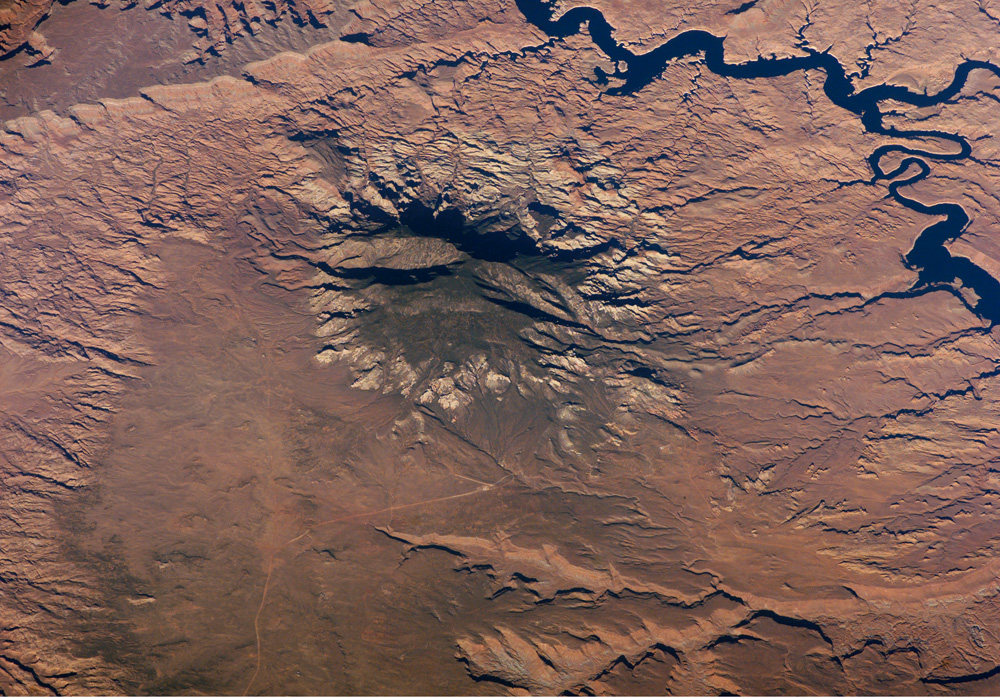
Navajo Mountain from space, October 2005

The Navajo Mountain region has special cultural significance to the Navajo people, who know it as Naatsisʼáán ("Earth Head" or "Pollen Mountain"). Together with Rainbow Bridge to the northwest, Navajo Mountain figures prominently as the first settlement area in western Navajo origin stories. Following the military defeat of the Diné (Navajo people) by United States forces in 1863, the political landscape was changed by new boundaries and major physical alterations. The establishment of Rainbow Bridge National Monument (1910), and the filling of Glen Canyon by Lake Powell in 1963, has facilitated tourism of this previously remote region. Access to Navajo Mountain is still regulated by the sovereign Navajo Nation, and a permit is required to hike in the region. Climbing the mountain itself is forbidden.

Before becoming part of the Navajo Nation, the area was inhabited by the Ancestral Puebloans. Their descendants, the Hopi, call Navajo Mountain Tokonave, or "Heart of the Earth". Ruins in the area of Navajo Mountain are still strongly associated with certain Hopi clans, with priests still making pilgrimages to shrines in the area.

Before 1933, when the area between the Colorado and San Juan Rivers and the Arizona border was added to the Navajo reservation, the area was known as the Paiute Strip, and the mountain itself was known as Paiute Mountain, due to the population of San Juan Paiutes living between the mountain and Monument Valley.

The community of Navajo Mountain, Utah is to the east.

== Ecology ==
The Navajo Mountain beardtongue (Penstemon navajoa) is a rare plant limited mainly to the upper elevation slopes of Navajo Mountain.

== See also ==
- List of mountains in Arizona
- List of mountains in Utah
