= Forrest L. Richardson =

American golf course architect (born 1959)

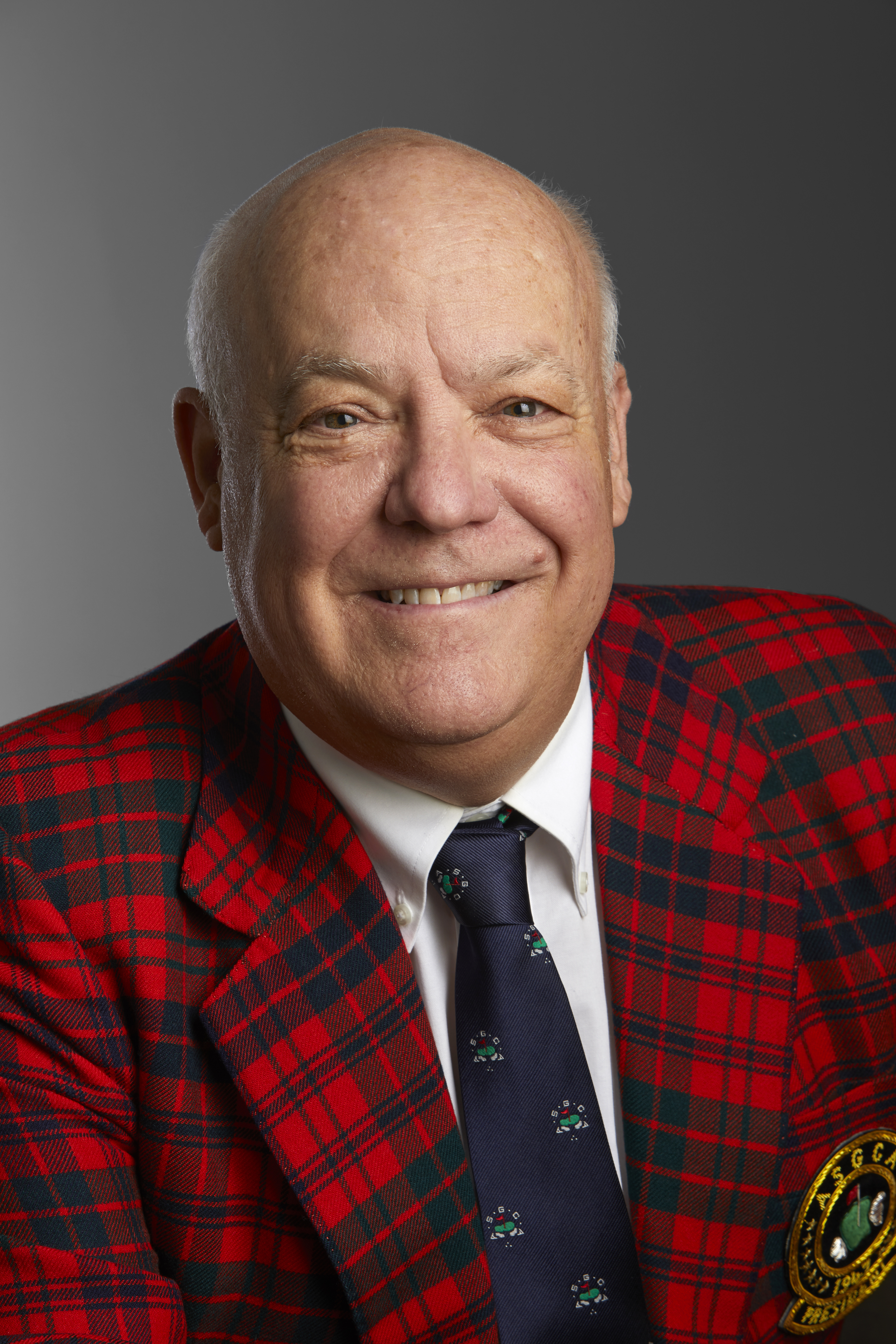
- Richardson in 2021
- Born: April 12, 1959 (age 67); Burbank, California, US
- Education: Phoenix College
- Occupation: Golf course architect
- Spouse: Valerie M. Richardson
- Children: Haley Lu Richardson

Forrest L. Richardson (born April 12, 1959) is an American golf course architect and member of the American Society of Golf Course Architects (ASGCA).

== Professional career ==
Forrest Richardson began his career under the guidance of Arthur Jack Snyder, a golf architect who changed his career from golf course superintendent to designer in the late 1950s. Snyder served as Grounds Superintendent of Oakmont Country Club in Pittsburgh in the early 1950s. In 1988 Forrest Richardson founded Golf Group Ltd. (now known as Forrest Richardson Golf Course Architects). Forrest Richardson Golf Course Architects is based in Phoenix, Arizona. Forrest Richardson has designed, remodeled and restored more than 20 golf courses and has been involved in the planning of more than 100 golf projects in and outside the US. Forrest Richardson served as President of the American Society of Golf Course Architects (ASGCA) in 2020-21.

== Other accomplishments and career highlights ==
Prior to becoming a golf course architect, Richardson had a brief career in market research and then in television art direction. He was Art Director of KPHO Television in Phoenix, Arizona from 1980 to 1981. In 1981 he founded Richardson or Richardson (dba Richardson Design) with his wife, Valerie. The firm, based in Phoenix, Arizona, was a design consultancy serving clients including Hilton Hotels, Disney Development, News Corporation and Coca-Cola. The firm specialized in brand development, packaging and environmental graphics. In 1986 the couple decided to shift away from branding and marketing to allow Forrest to pursue his work as a golf course architect. Richardson has written five books on the subject of golf course architecture and is a contributor to some magazines and publications on golf management and golf development.

== Books authored ==
Year	Title	Publisher	Notes
2002	Routing the Golf Course - The Art & Science That Forms the Golf Journey	John Wiley & Sons	(Hardcover)
2005	Bunkers, Pits & Other Hazards: A Guide to the Design, Maintenance, and Preservation of Golf's Essential Elements	John Wiley & Sons	(Hardcover)
2005	On Course - A Dictionary of Words & Terms Used by Golf Course Architects	On Course Publishing	(Softcover)
2013	Course Brains - 25 Questions To Help Measure the I.Q. of Your Golf Course	On Course Publishing	(Softcover)
2013	Of Course - Portfolio of Projects of Forrest Richardson & Associates 1994 to Present	On Course Publishing	(Hardcover)
2026	The Sustainable Sport — How Golf's Five Million Acres Benefit Our World	On Course Publishing	(Softcover)

== Representative golf course projects ==
Course	Location	Notes
Shalimar Golf Club (aka Caddyshack and Cheers! In Tempe)	Tempe, Arizona	(with Forrest Richardson) 1961
Arizona Grand Resort (aka Phantom Horse and Pointe at South Mountain resort)	Phoenix, Arizona	(with Arthur Jack Snyder) 1985
Legend Trail Golf Club	Scottsdale, Arizona	(with Arthur Jack Snyder and Rees Jones)
Links at Las Palomas	Puerto Peñasco, Mexico	(with Arthur Jack Snyder)
Olivas Links	Ventura, California	
The Hideout Golf Club	Monticello, Utah	(with Arthur Jack Snyder)
Coyote Lakes Golf Club	Surprise, Arizona	(with Arthur Jack Snyder)
Lookout Mountain Golf Club	Phoenix, Arizona	
Short Course at Mountain Shadows	Paradise Valley, Arizona	
Peacock Gap Golf Club	San Rafael, California	
Coldwater Golf Club	Avondale, Arizona	
Berkeley Country Club	El Cerrito, California	Original design by Robert Hunter, restored 2011
Wigwam Golf Club - Gold Course	Litchfield Park, Arizona	Original design by Robert Trent Jones, Sr., remodeled 2005
Arizona Biltmore Golf Club	Phoenix, Arizona	Original design by William P. Bell, remodeled 2004
Baylands Golf Links	Palo Alto, California	Reconstruction project 2018
