= Monticello High School (Utah) =

High school in Utah, United States

Coordinates: 37°52′15″N 109°20′50″W

Location
- 164 South 200 West; Monticello, (San Juan County), Utah 84535; United States

Information
- Type: Public high school
- Principal: K.C. Olson
- Staff: 13.48 (FTE)
- Enrollment: 217 (2023-2024)
- Student to teacher ratio: 16.10
- Colors: Orange and black
- Nickname: Buckaroos
- Website: monticello-high.sjsd.org/o/mhs/

Monticello High School is located in Monticello, Utah, United States. The school mascot is the Buckaroo and the school colors are orange and black. It is a part of the San Juan School District.

The school won its first football state championship in 1969. They also won the 1A Football State Championship in 1992, 2001, and 2004, defeating the Rich Rebels at all three. They have also won two state championships in basketball, one in 1994 as a 2A school and one in 2014 as a 1A school. They have won nine state wrestling championships, in 1973–1978, 1986, 2009 and 2014. Monticello's most successful athletic program as far as state championships is its cross-country program which has amassed 12 girl's tiles (1982–87, 1992-1995, 1999 and 2000) and 11 boy's titles (1979, 1988, 1990, 1996, 2000, 2011–14, 2017 and 2018)
