= Bee Hółdzil Fighting Scouts Events Center =

Indoor arena in Fort Defiance, Arizona

The Bee Hółdzil Fighting Scouts Events Center is a 6,500-seat indoor arena located in Fort Defiance, Arizona, United States. It is used primarily for basketball, and is the home of the Window Rock High School Fighting Scouts basketball and volleyball teams. It opened in January 2014 and is one of the premier rezball venues in Arizona. The three-level arena's seating is divided into a 4,000-seat main level, a 2,500-seat upper level and a 40-seat hospitality suite. The arena also contains a 50-seat press box and a center-hung video scoreboard.

The arena floor can accommodate a full-sized basketball court, three volleyball courts or up to 1,000-floor seats (maximum concert capacity is 7,200). It is the second largest venue in the Four Corners region after, and is used as an alternative to, McGee Park Coliseum in Farmington, New Mexico. In addition to sporting events and concerts, it is also used for the Ringling Bros. and Barnum & Bailey Circus, Disney on Ice, the Harlem Globetrotters, graduations, and other events. The four concession stands at the arena are named for the Navajo Nation's Four Sacred Mountains and their associated sacred stones.
