= Navajo Mountain, Utah =

Census-designated place in San Juan County, Utah, United States

Navajo Mountain, Utah Naatsisʼáán (Navajo)
- Census-designated place
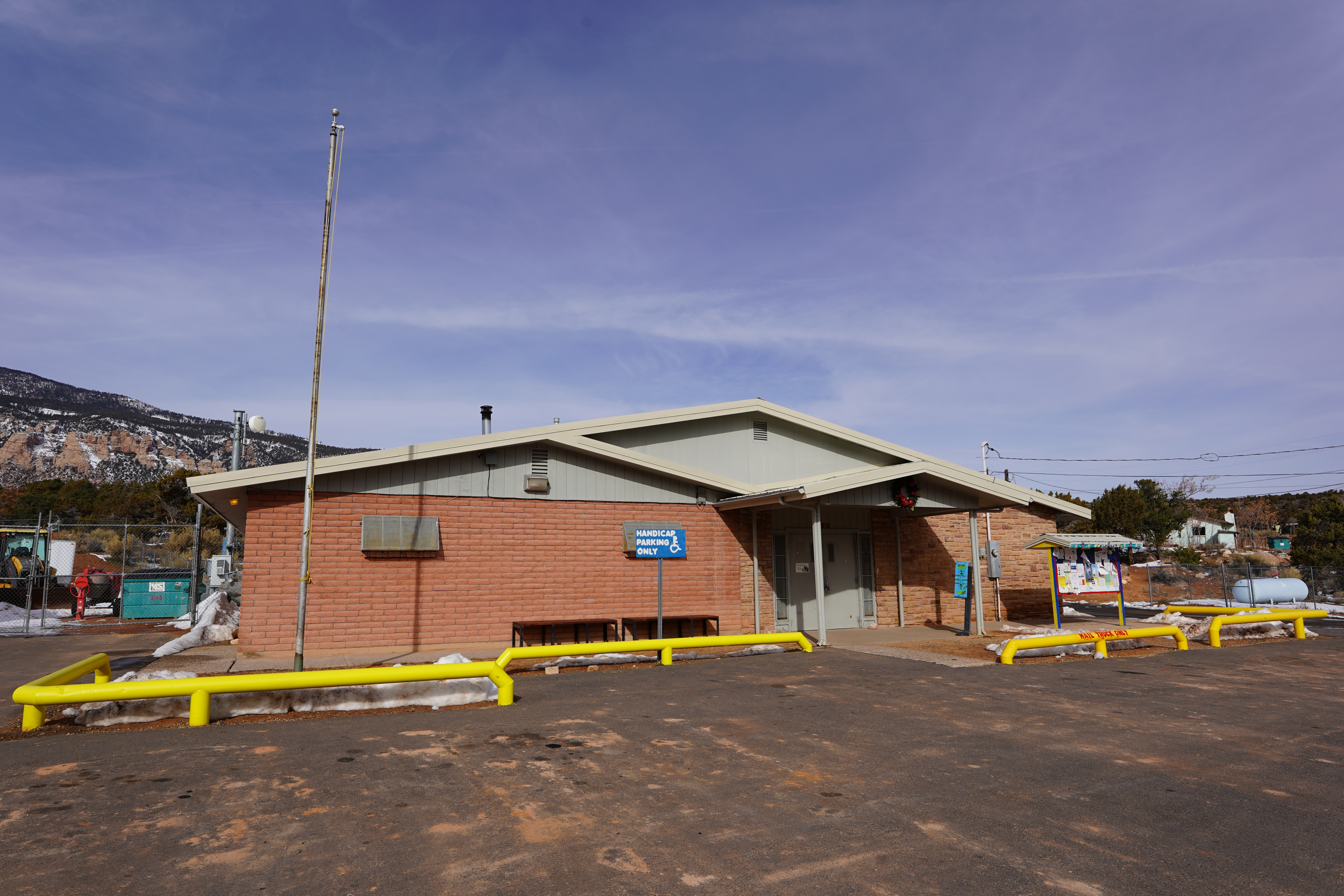
- Naatsis'áán Chapter House, January 2019

- Location on Navajo Mountain within San Juan County and the State of Utah.
- Coordinates: 37°02′40″N 110°46′26″W
- Country: United States
- State: Utah
- County: San Juan

Area
  - Total: 31.6 sq mi (81.8 km^{2})
  - Land: 31.6 sq mi (81.8 km^{2})
  - Water: 0 sq mi (0.0 km^{2})
- Elevation: 5,876 ft (1,791 m)

Population (2000)
  - Total: 379
  - Density: 12/sq mi (4.6/km^{2})
- Time zone: UTC-7 (Mountain (MST))
  - Summer (DST): UTC-6 (MDT)
- ZIP code: 84536
- Area code: 435
- FIPS code: 49-53890
- GNIS feature ID: 2408905

Navajo Mountain (Navajo: Naatsisʼáán) is a census-designated place (CDP) on the Navajo Nation in southwestern San Juan County, Utah, United States. The 2020 census was recorded as 450.

== Description ==
The CDP is named after Navajo Mountain and that name, Naatsisʼáán, means "Head of the Earth Woman" and is an important part of the Navajo creation story as is the adjacent Rainbow Bridge rock formation.

== Geography ==
According to the United States Census Bureau, the CDP has a total area of 31.6 square miles (82 km^{2}), all land.

== Demographics ==
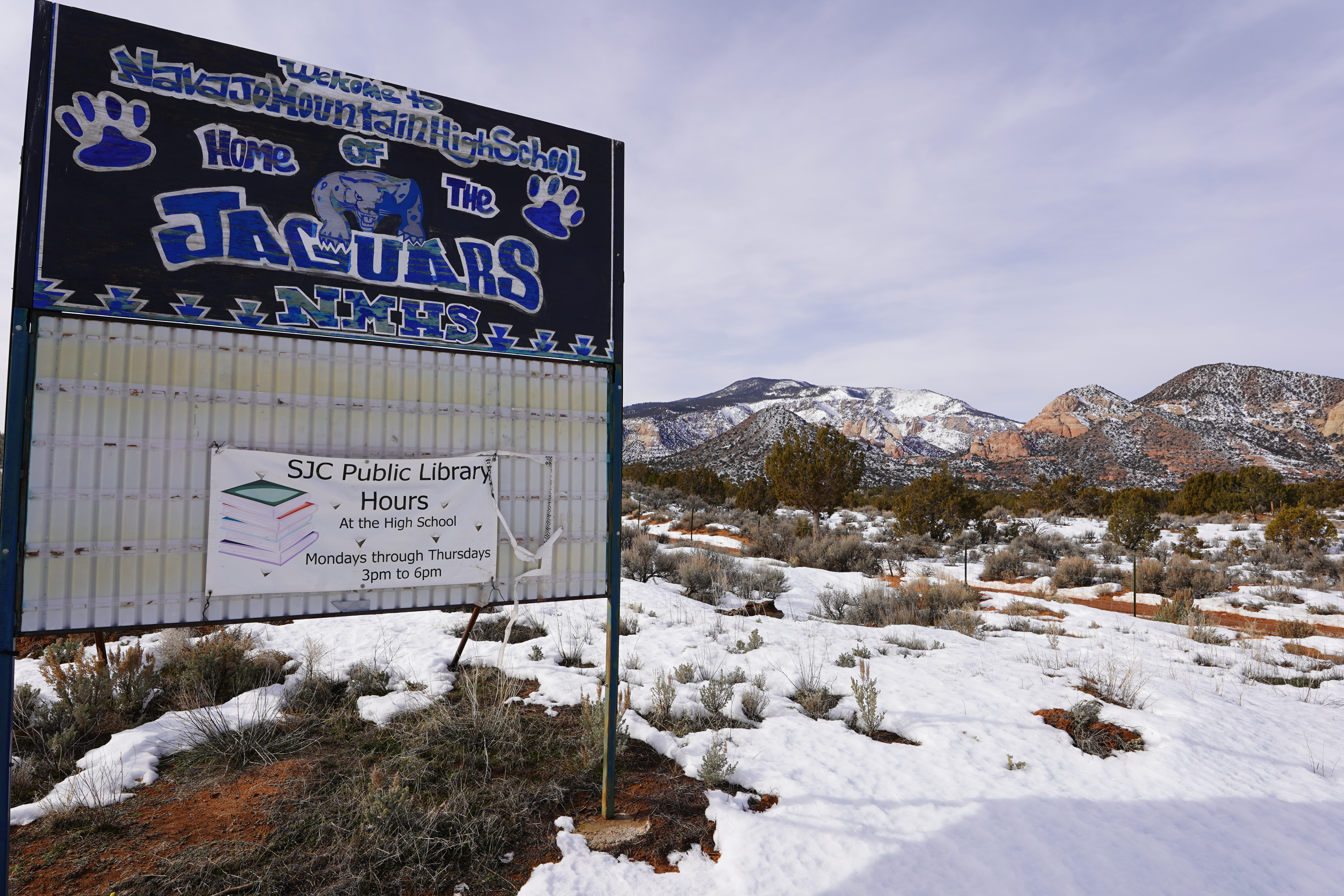
Navajo Mountain High School sign with eponymous mountain in background, January 2019

As of the census of 2000, there were 379 people, 93 households, and 79 families residing in the CDP. The population density was 12.0 inhabitants per square mile (4.6/km^{2}). There were 120 housing units at an average density of 3.8 square miles (9.8 km^{2}). The racial makeup of the CDP was 96.83% Native American, 2.90% White and 0.26% from two or more races.

There were 93 households, out of which 51.6% had children under the age of 18 living with them, 59.1% were married couples living together, 20.4% had a female householder with no husband present, and 14.0% were non-families. 12.9% of all households were made up of individuals, and 6.5% had someone living alone who was 65 years of age or older. The average household size was 4.08 and the average family size was 4.55.

In the CDP, the population was spread out, with 44.9% under the age of 18, 10.6% from 18 to 24, 22.4% from 25 to 44, 14.8% from 45 to 64, and 7.4% who were 65 years of age or older. The median age was 21 years. For every 100 females, there were 101.6 males. For every 100 females age 18 and over, there were 93.5 males.

The median income for a household in the CDP was $14,196, and the median income for a family was $13,929. Males had a median income of $8,750 versus $23,750 for females. The per capita income for the CDP was $6,265. About 61.4% of families and 65.4% of the population were below the poverty line, including 78.6% of those under age 18 and 53.6% of those age 65 or over.

== Education ==
The San Juan School District, the local public school district, operates Navajo Mountain High School.

A tribal school, NaaTsis'aan (Navajo Mountain) Community School, serves lower grades.

A former school building was renovated and reopened as an arts education center.

== See also ==
- List of census-designated places in Utah
