= Oljato-Monument Valley, Utah =

Monument Valley, Utah Ooljééʼtó (Navajo)
- CDP
- Oljato-Monument Valley, Utah
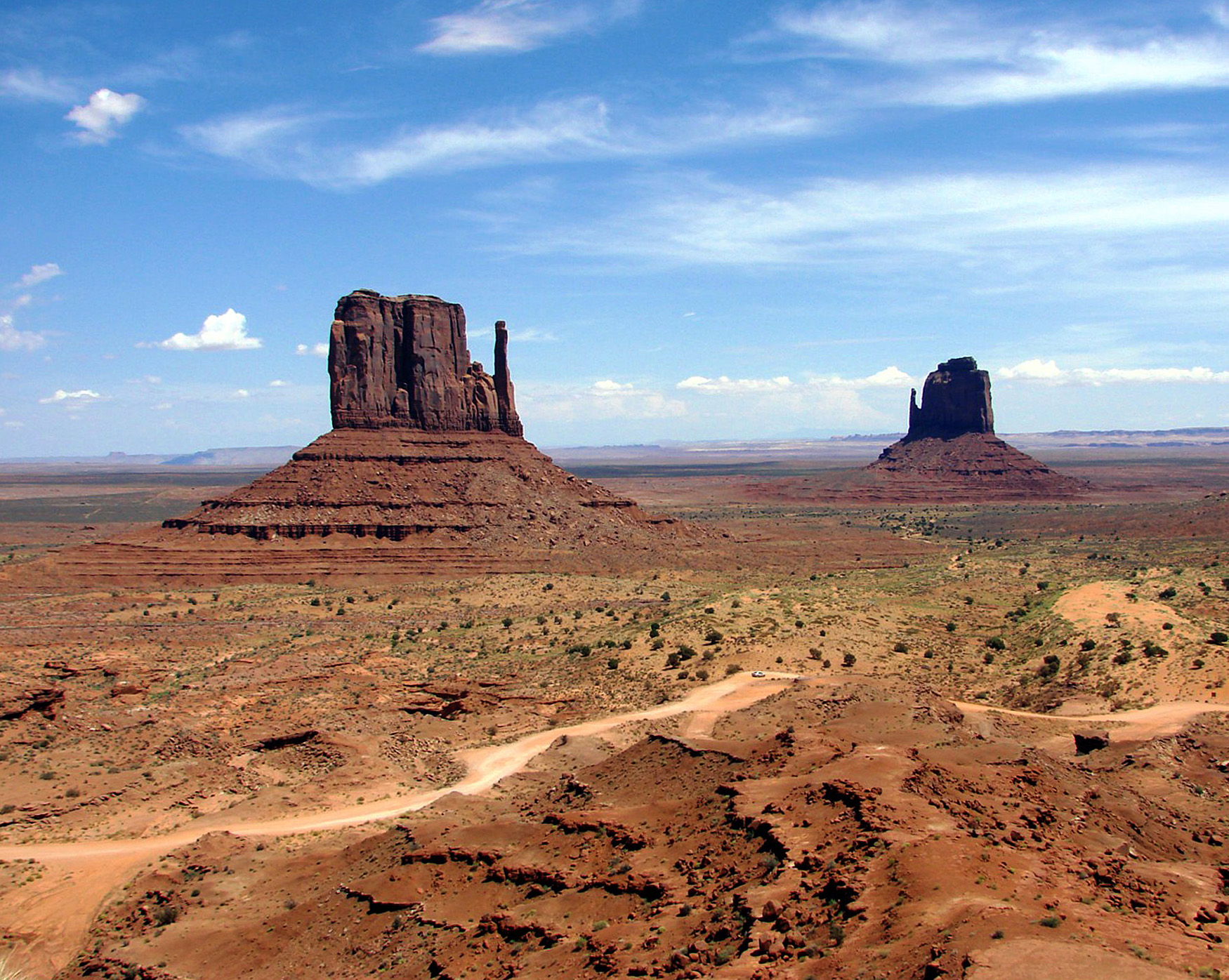
- Two distinctive geological features found within the Monument Valley Navajo Tribal Park in northeast Navajo County, Arizona near Monument Valley, Utah

- Location in San Juan County and the state of Utah.
- Coordinates: 37°0′38″N 110°14′34″W
- Country: United States
- State: Utah
- County: San Juan

Area
  - Total: 28.7 sq mi (74.4 km^{2})
  - Land: 28.7 sq mi (74.4 km^{2})
- Elevation: 5,794 ft (1,766 m)

Population (2020)
  - Total: 682
  - Density: 23.7/sq mi (9.17/km^{2})
- Time zone: UTC-7 (Mountain (MST))
  - Summer (DST): UTC-6 (MDT)
- GNIS feature ID: 2408988

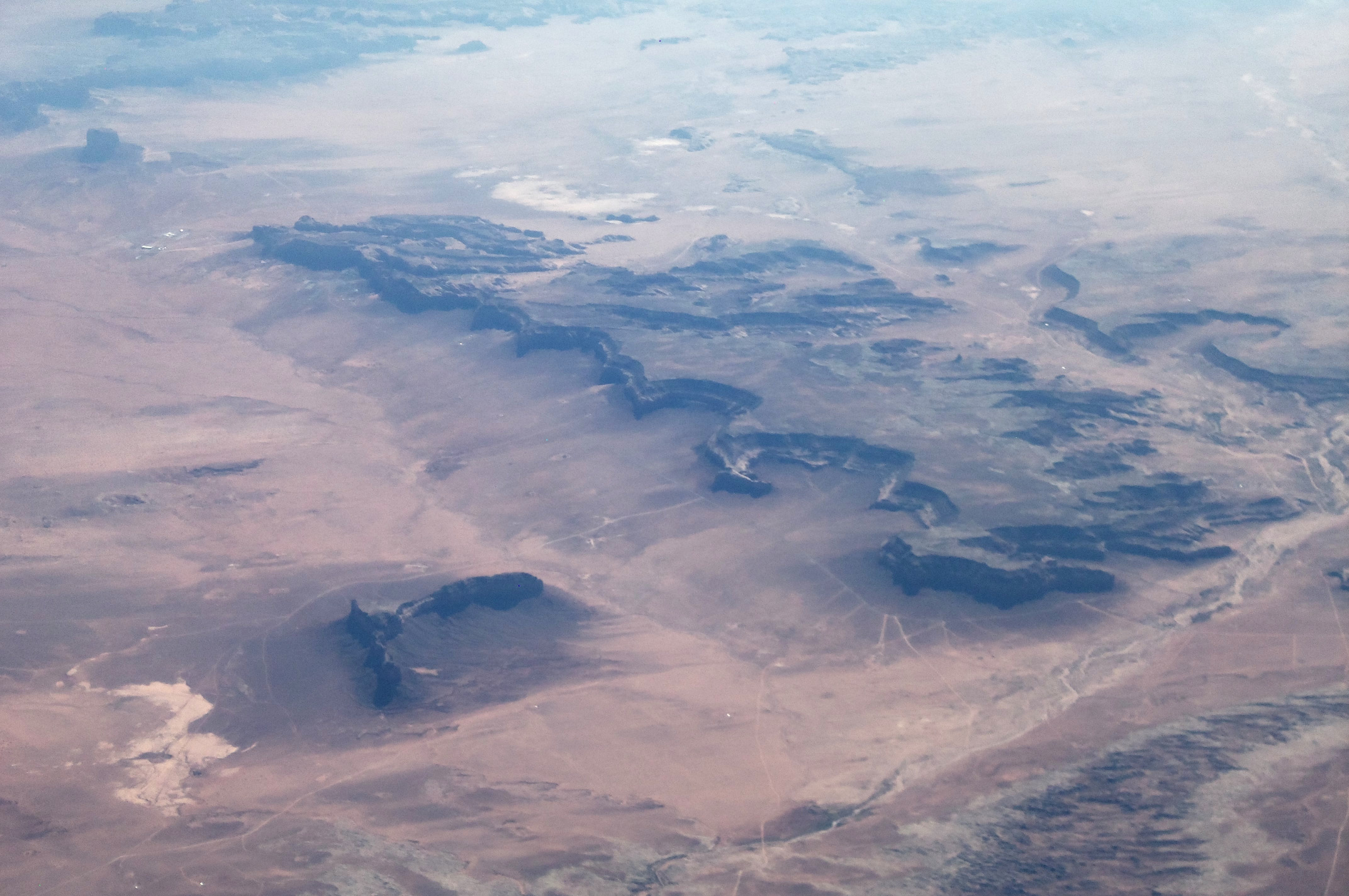
Oljato Mesa on the border of Utah and Arizona

Oljato-Monument Valley (Navajo: Ooljééʼtó) is a census-designated place (CDP) in San Juan County, Utah, United States. The population was 682 at the 2020 census.

It is the location of Monument Valley.

== Geography ==
According to the United States Census Bureau, the CDP has a total area of 28.7 square miles (74.4 km^{2}), all land.

== Demographics ==
At the 2000 census, there were 864 people, 207 households, and 174 families in the CDP. The population density was 30.1 people per square mile (11.6/km^{2}). There were 275 housing units at an average density of 9.6/sq mi (3.7/km^{2}). The racial makeup of the CDP was 94.10% Native American, 5.44% White, 0.12% Pacific Islander, 0.23% from other races, and 0.12% from two or more races. Hispanic or Latino of any race were 0.93% of the population.

Of the 207 households, 55.1% had children under the age of 18 living with them, 58.0% were married couples living together, 20.8% had a female householder with no husband present, and 15.5% were non-families. 13.0% of households were one person and 1.9% were one person aged 65 or older. The average household size was 4.17 and the average family size was 4.61.

The age distribution was 43.4% under the age of 18, 12.3% from 18 to 24, 26.9% from 25 to 44, 13.8% from 45 to 64, and 3.7% 65 or older. The median age was 22 years. For every 100 females there were 103.3 males. For every 100 females age 18 and over, there were 97.2 males.

The median household income was $32,188 and the median family income was $32,768. Males had a median income of $28,646 versus $25,278 for females. The per capita income for the CDP was $7,904. About 25.7% of the families and 23.8% of the population were below the poverty line, including 23.2% under the age of 18 and none 65 or older.

== Education ==
San Juan School District operates two public schools in the community: Tsé'bii'bidzisgai Elementary School and Monument Valley High School.

== See also ==
- List of census-designated places in Utah
- Oljato-Monument Valley, Arizona
