= Whitehorse High School =

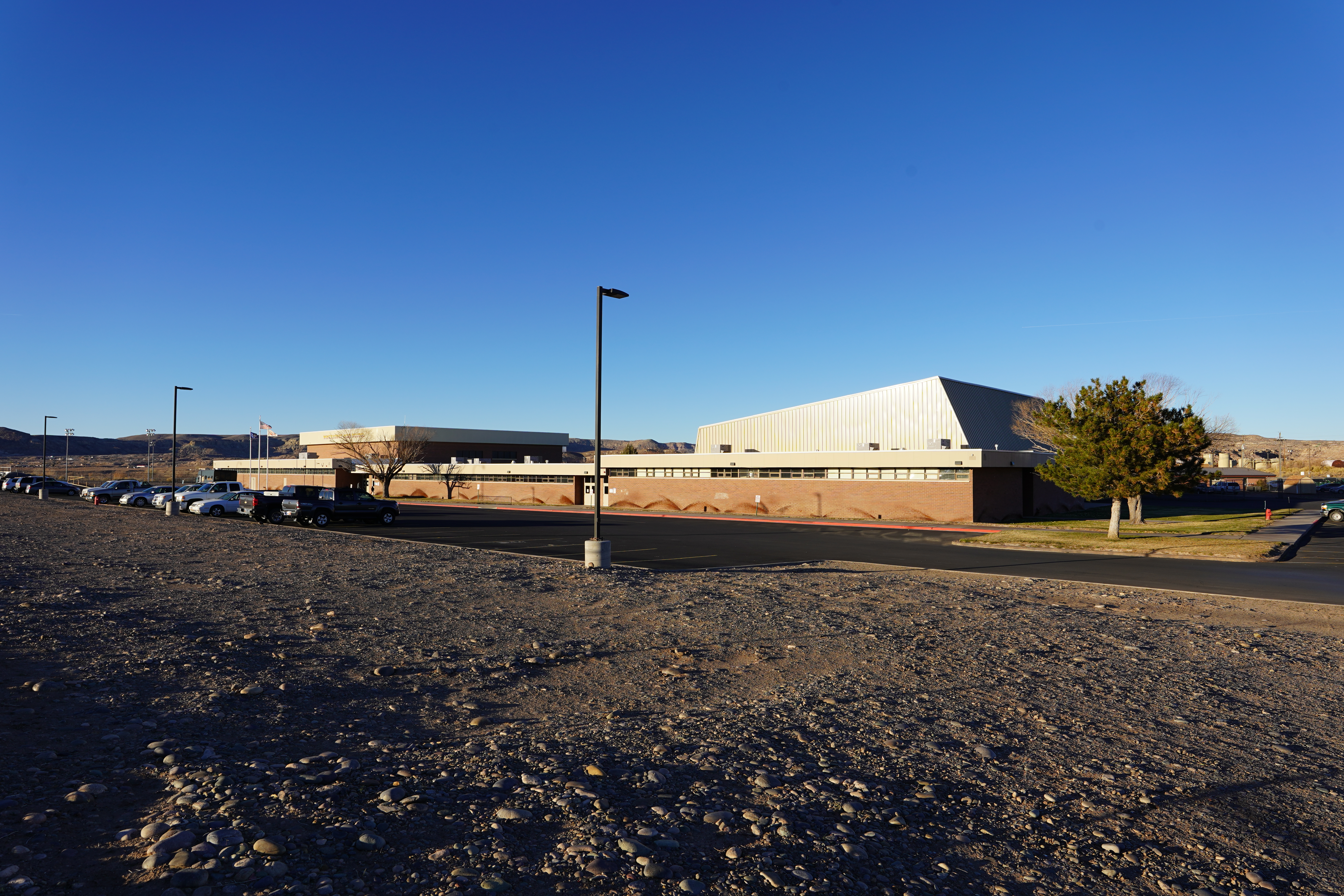

Location
- State Highway #262; Montezuma Creek, Utah 84534; United States; 37°15′58.67″N 109°18′44.5″W

Information
- School type: Public, high school
- Founded: 1978
- NCES School ID: 490090000667
- Principal: Kim Schaefer
- Grades: 7-12
- Enrollment: 304 (2023-2024)
- Colors: Black and gold
- Mascot: Raiders
- Website: whitehorse-high.sjsd.org/o/whs

Whitehorse High School is located in Montezuma Creek, Utah. The school is in the San Juan School District, and serves grades 7–12.

In the 2017–18 school year, several organizations assisted Whitehorse High School students participate in programs promoting use of the Navajo language including the San Juan School District Bilingual Education Department and the Navajo Nation Johnson O'Malley Indian Education Committee.
