= Monticello, Utah =

City in Utah, United States

- City
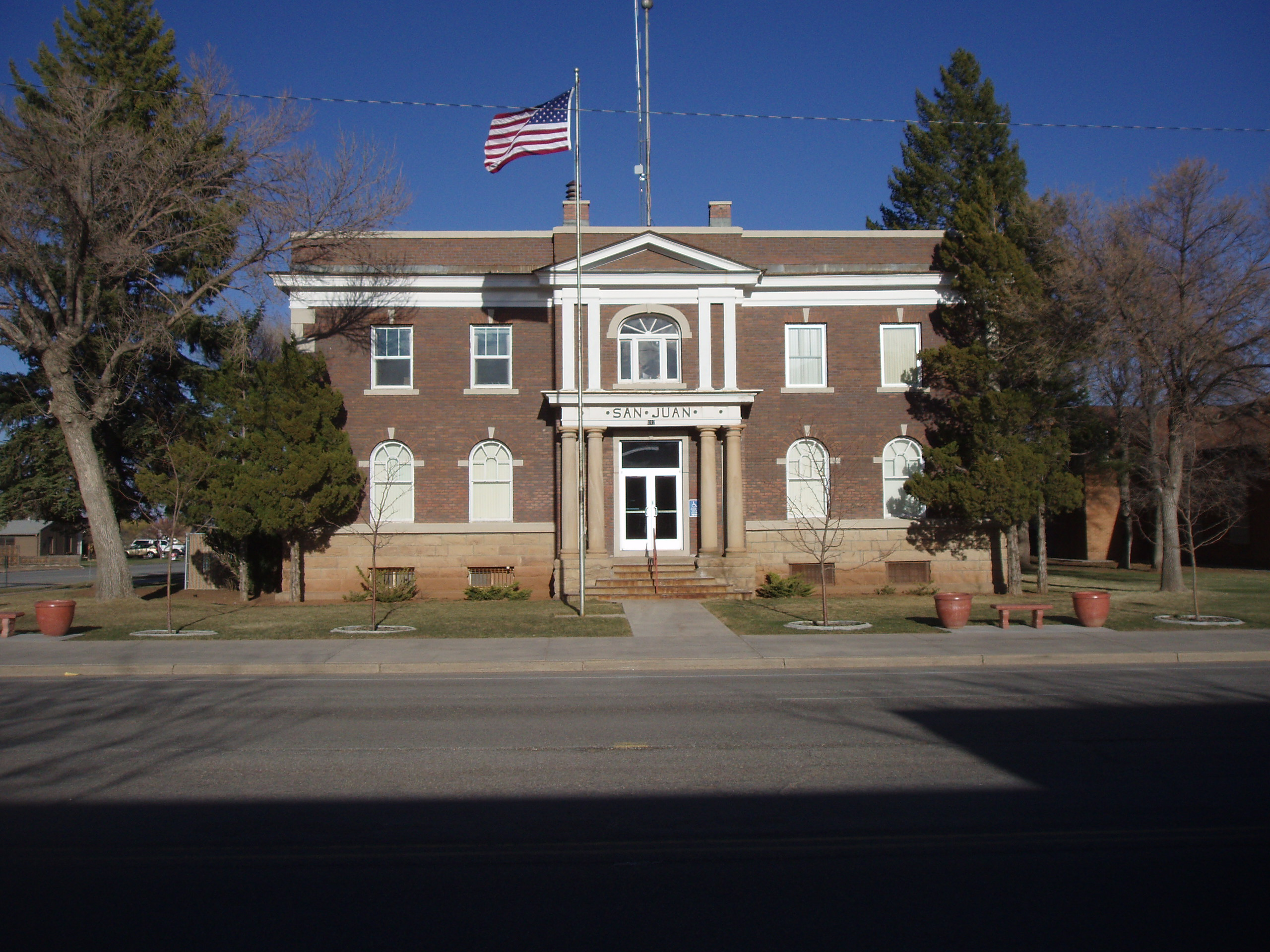
- San Juan County Courthouse

- Location in San Juan County and the state of Utah.
- Coordinates: 37°52′22″N 109°20′14″W
- Country: United States
- State: Utah
- County: San Juan
- Founded: 1887
- Named for: Monticello

Area
  - Total: 3.66 sq mi (9.49 km^{2})
  - Land: 3.66 sq mi (9.49 km^{2})
  - Water: 0 sq mi (0.00 km^{2})
- Elevation: 7,021 ft (2,140 m)

Population (2020)
  - Total: 1,824
  - Density: 537.4/sq mi (207.48/km^{2})
- Time zone: UTC−7 (Mountain (MST))
  - Summer (DST): UTC−6 (MDT)
- ZIP code: 84535
- Area code: 435
- FIPS code: 49-51580
- GNIS feature ID: 2411149
- Website: www.monticelloutah.org

Monticello (/ˌmɒntɪˈsɛloʊ/ MON-tiss-EL-oh) is a city in and the county seat of San Juan County, Utah, United States. It is the second most populous city in San Juan County, with a population of 1,824 at the 2020 census. The Monticello area was settled in July 1887 by pioneers from the Church of Jesus Christ of Latter-day Saints. Monticello, named in honor of Thomas Jefferson's estate, became the county seat in 1895 and was incorporated as a city in 1910.

Monticello, along with much of San Juan County, experienced an increase in population and economic activity during the uranium boom from the late 1940s to the early 1960s. Several uranium and vanadium mines were opened in the area, and a uranium processing mill was operated in Monticello by the Federal Government from 1948 to 1960. Following the uranium boom, a massive cleanup project was conducted by the U.S. Department of Energy from 1989 to 2004 to remove radioactive material from lands and buildings and to restore the land formerly occupied by the mill.

An 18-hole golf course, The Hideout, was built near the reclaimed site of the uranium mill using DOE cleanup funding in 2000. The Hideout has been ranked the No. 2 Golf Course in Utah and the No. 23 Municipal Golf Course in the U.S.

In 1998, The Church of Jesus Christ of Latter-day Saints dedicated the Monticello Utah Temple, the first in a series of mini temples and the 53rd temple for the church.

Monticello rests at the base of the Abajo Mountains on the Colorado Plateau.

== History ==
The Old Spanish Trail trade route passed through the area of Monticello from 1829 into the 1850s.

Monticello was one of the many cities established by Mormon pioneers in the Utah Territory, which became the State of Utah. Farming, ranching, and uranium mining have all played an important role in the economy and history of the town.

=== Settlement ===
Early members of The Church of Jesus Christ of Latter-day Saints began the first full-scale settling of what is now known as San Juan County, Utah. Few white residents had settled along the San Juan River before the arrival of the Mormon pioneers from the San Juan Expedition. After passing through Hole-In-The-Rock, the pioneers arrived in the San Juan County area and settled in Bluff on 6 April 1880. In that year, on a journey to northern Utah from the San Juan River settlements, Apostles Erastus Snow and Brigham Young Jr. passed through the current site of Monticello. They were quite impressed by it, and this encounter was one of the key factors behind LDS settlement there a few years later. After struggling to farm along the unpredictable San Juan River, leaders began to look to settle the higher country at the base of the Abajo Mountains, also known as the Blue Mountains, where several streams and springs descended from the mountain. Piute Springs, Soldier's Spring, and Montezuma Creek were a few of the water sources in the area named by passersby.

In March 1886, Francis A. Hammond, the LDS Stake President (the leading LDS regional authority) of San Juan County, sent scouts from Bluff to identify possible locations for settlements near the water sources of the Blue Mountains. The scouts found that a few people had already begun to utilize the land. The first white man to build a cabin in the Monticello area was likely cattleman Patrick O'Donnell in 1879. The North and South Forks of Montezuma Canyon, through which Montezuma Creek flows, were being utilized when the scouts arrived. The Kansas and New Mexico Cattle and Land Company, operated by Edmund and Harold Carlisle, was located a few miles north of what is now Monticello, and the L.C. outfit was headquartered in the South Fork of Montezuma Canyon.

Notwithstanding the fact that others were utilizing the land, Hammond sent the families of George A. Adams, Frederick I. Jones, Parley R. Butt and Charles E. Walton from Bluff to establish a new settlement at what is now Monticello. They first set up camp at Verdure near the South Fork of Montezuma Creek on March 11, 1887, six miles (10 km) south of what is now Monticello. By the first part of July 1887, the men had begun to plant crops, survey an irrigation ditch, and layout a townsite in the present-day Monticello area. Conflicts soon began with the Carlisle cowboys and Ute Indians over water and land rights, resulting in warning shots, heated disputes, and legal battles.

Learning from lawyers that the Carlisles had very little legal claim to any of the region, the Mormons claimed all the water from the South Fork and three-fourths of the water from the North Fork. In the spring of 1888, the Adams and Butt families remained in Verdure while the rest of the settlers moved to North Montezuma and began construction of the town.

Early names for the settlement were North Montezuma Creek, Piute Springs, and Hammond, after the stake president. In a formal meeting in 1888, three names were under consideration: North Montezuma, Hammond, and the biblical name, Antioch. None of the younger community members approved the names. When Hammond recommended Monticello, in honor of Thomas Jefferson's estate, everyone approved and it was accepted.

=== 1900 to 1940 ===
In 1903, the Utah State Agricultural College (now Utah State University) in Logan established an experimental station in Verdure, where it tested various dry-farming techniques for thirteen years. This information spurred the growth of the farming industry in the area. In 1909, the Enlarged Homestead Act was passed, which provided 320 acres (1.3 km^{2}) of non-irrigable land for a small price. New farms began to cover the sagebrush lands north and east of Monticello. Dry farming was a major occupation in the area up through the 1930s and is a vital part of the local economy today.

The first phone lines were installed in the community in 1906, tying into Colorado circuits. The Blue Mountain Irrigation Company organized construction of a combined water and power system in 1917. The San Juan Record, the county newspaper, was established in Monticello by Oscar Walter McConkie in 1915, where it remains to this day.

A substantive population of Latino Mormons had formed in the area by the 1920s, as well as a population of Latino Catholics that founded Utah’s first Hispanic Catholic church in Monticello.

=== Uranium mining ===
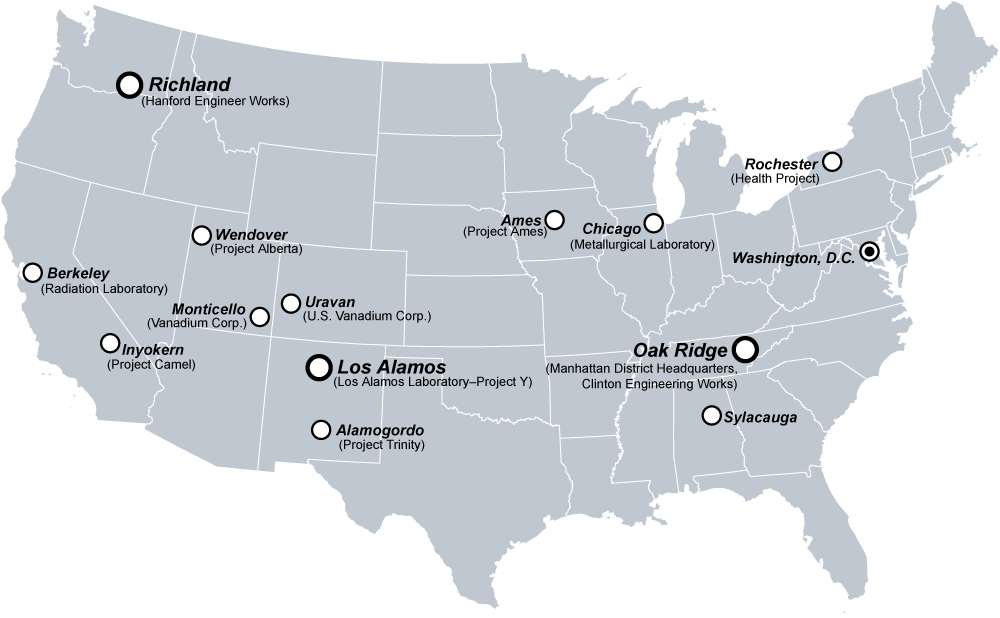
Monticello, Utah, where a uranium mill was operated by Vanadium Corp., was among the U.S. sites important to the Manhattan Project.

The Vanadium Corporation of America (VCA) began construction of a vanadium mill in Monticello in 1941 in response to the increased demand for radioactive material brought about by World War II. In 1943, VCA began producing a uranium-vanadium sludge for the Manhattan Engineer District. It employed 200 workers until it closed in 1946. In 1948, the U.S. Federal Government purchased the mill and reopened it in 1949 as a converted uranium and vanadium processing plant.

Monticello and the San Juan County area experienced significant growth during the uranium boom of the 1950s. The uranium mines in San Juan County were among the richest in the nation. The Happy Jack Mine, located in White Canyon, San Juan County, was founded by Monticello natives Fletch Bronson and Joe Cooper. The Happy Jack Mine was the second richest deposit of high-grade uranium ore in the nation, the first being the MiVida Mine, also in San Juan County. During these years the mill at Monticello processed large amounts of ore taken from the canyons of southeastern Utah. The population of Monticello more than doubled during this time as a result of the activity at the processing plant and the mining activity in the region. County assessed valuation jumped from $1 million in the 1940s to $132 million in 1959. Oil and mining accounted for 94 percent of the property tax in San Juan County during those years, and the San Juan School District became the state's highest paying district.

Demand for uranium subsided in the early 1960s. On January 1, 1960, the mill was closed permanently by the Atomic Energy Commission. The mill tailings were stabilized by 1962, and the mill was dismantled in 1964.

A massive cleanup project was conducted by the U.S. Department of Energy from 1989 to 2004 to remove radioactive material from lands and buildings and to restore the land formerly occupied by the mill. All radioactive material was removed and placed in a controlled repository near Monticello. Funding was provided to restore the former mill site and roughly 150 acres (0.61 km^{2}) of surrounding land to a usable condition. In a deal with the Federal Government, the City of Monticello reseeded and restored the reclaimed land; upon completion, the city received roughly $7 million from the government.

With the remaining cleanup funds, the city decided to expand the existing 9-hole golf course into an 18-hole course. The course site is adjacent to the mill site. Longtime resident Rex Jensen donated land to the city to be used for expanding the course towards the mountain. The course was designed by Forrest Richardson & Assoc. Golf Course Architects and construction was completed in 2001.

Many Monticello residents claim that the exposure to the radioactive mill tailings caused cancer in residents and mill workers. Efforts have been made and are ongoing to secure compensation for the illness or death of family members exposed to the mill tailings. In 2009, legislation was passed to provide free cancer screening to residents who lived in Monticello between 1941 and 2000.

== Geography and climate ==
Monticello is located in the Four Corners area of the Colorado Plateau.

According to the United States Census Bureau, the city has a total area of 2.6 square miles (6.7 km^{2}), all land, making it the largest city in the county in terms of area.

Monticello is located at the base of the Abajo Mountains, or the Blue Mountains, which are part of the Manti-La Sal National Forest. The elevation of Monticello is 7,069 feet (2,155 m). From Monticello, a tree formation on the Blue Mountains can be seen, which resembles a horse's head and neck, which can be seen from any point in town.

Monticello is 40 miles from the Needles District of Canyonlands National Park and is 59 miles from Arches National Park, located near Moab.

=== Climate ===
Similar to other high-altitude locations in the western United States, such as Flagstaff, Arizona, Aspen, Colorado and Los Alamos, New Mexico, Monticello has a warm-summer humid continental climate according to the Köppen climate classification system, abbreviated Dfb on climate maps.

Climate data for Monticello, Utah, 1991–2020 normals, extremes 1902–2011
Month	Jan	Feb	Mar	Apr	May	Jun	Jul	Aug	Sep	Oct	Nov	Dec	Year
Record high °F (°C)	57 (14)	80 (27)	81 (27)	80 (27)	91 (33)	97 (36)	97 (36)	101 (38)	91 (33)	86 (30)	70 (21)	69 (21)	101 (38)
Mean maximum °F (°C)	47.6 (8.7)	52.1 (11.2)	63.1 (17.3)	72.0 (22.2)	80.6 (27.0)	88.9 (31.6)	92.1 (33.4)	88.5 (31.4)	83.8 (28.8)	73.2 (22.9)	60.7 (15.9)	49.7 (9.8)	92.6 (33.7)
Mean daily maximum °F (°C)	36.3 (2.4)	40.5 (4.7)	50.4 (10.2)	59.0 (15.0)	69.1 (20.6)	80.8 (27.1)	85.3 (29.6)	82.1 (27.8)	75.0 (23.9)	61.5 (16.4)	48.1 (8.9)	36.0 (2.2)	60.3 (15.7)
Daily mean °F (°C)	25.7 (−3.5)	30.1 (−1.1)	38.0 (3.3)	45.1 (7.3)	54.0 (12.2)	63.8 (17.7)	69.5 (20.8)	67.5 (19.7)	59.8 (15.4)	47.6 (8.7)	35.9 (2.2)	26.1 (−3.3)	46.9 (8.3)
Mean daily minimum °F (°C)	15.2 (−9.3)	19.6 (−6.9)	25.6 (−3.6)	31.3 (−0.4)	38.8 (3.8)	46.9 (8.3)	53.6 (12.0)	52.9 (11.6)	44.7 (7.1)	33.7 (0.9)	23.7 (−4.6)	16.2 (−8.8)	33.5 (0.8)
Mean minimum °F (°C)	−2.8 (−19.3)	1.1 (−17.2)	9.4 (−12.6)	18.8 (−7.3)	25.0 (−3.9)	33.9 (1.1)	43.6 (6.4)	43.2 (6.2)	31.0 (−0.6)	20.3 (−6.5)	6.3 (−14.3)	−2.5 (−19.2)	−7.5 (−21.9)
Record low °F (°C)	−18 (−28)	−21 (−29)	−9 (−23)	4 (−16)	10 (−12)	27 (−3)	33 (1)	25 (−4)	22 (−6)	5 (−15)	−8 (−22)	−22 (−30)	−22 (−30)
Average precipitation inches (mm)	1.57 (40)	1.48 (38)	1.09 (28)	0.88 (22)	0.89 (23)	0.51 (13)	1.36 (35)	1.80 (46)	1.67 (42)	1.32 (34)	1.19 (30)	1.34 (34)	15.10 (384)
Average snowfall inches (cm)	13.4 (34)	13.5 (34)	7.4 (19)	6.1 (15)	1.1 (2.8)	0.1 (0.25)	0.0 (0.0)	0.0 (0.0)	0.1 (0.25)	1.3 (3.3)	7.3 (19)	13.9 (35)	64.2 (162.6)
Average extreme snow depth inches (cm)	11.6 (29)	10.5 (27)	5.9 (15)	0.8 (2.0)	0.2 (0.51)	0.0 (0.0)	0.0 (0.0)	0.0 (0.0)	0.0 (0.0)	0.4 (1.0)	4.1 (10)	8.6 (22)	16.1 (41)
Average precipitation days (≥ 0.01 in)	6.3	6.4	5.8	5.5	5.4	4.1	7.5	9.9	7.7	6.6	5.3	5.7	76.2
Average snowy days (≥ 0.1 in)	5.5	4.7	3.5	2.4	0.5	0.1	0.0	0.0	0.0	0.8	2.4	4.6	24.5
Source 1: NOAA
Source 2: XMACIS2

== Demographics ==
Historical population
Census	Pop.	Note	%±
1890	115		—
1900	180		56.5%
1910	375		108.3%
1920	768		104.8%
1930	496		−35.4%
1940	667		34.5%
1950	1,172		75.7%
1960	1,845		57.4%
1970	1,431		−22.4%
1980	1,929		34.8%
1990	1,806		−6.4%
2000	1,958		8.4%
2010	1,972		0.7%
2020	1,824		−7.5%
U.S. Decennial Census

=== 2020 census ===
As of the 2020 census, Monticello had a population of 1,824. The median age was 34.2 years. 30.4% of residents were under the age of 18 and 16.1% of residents were 65 years of age or older. For every 100 females there were 110.6 males, and for every 100 females age 18 and over there were 111.9 males age 18 and over.

0.0% of residents lived in urban areas, while 100.0% lived in rural areas.

There were 616 households in Monticello, of which 41.2% had children under the age of 18 living in them. Of all households, 60.7% were married-couple households, 15.9% were households with a male householder and no spouse or partner present, and 21.4% were households with a female householder and no spouse or partner present. About 20.1% of all households were made up of individuals and 10.7% had someone living alone who was 65 years of age or older.

There were 692 housing units, of which 11.0% were vacant. The homeowner vacancy rate was 1.2% and the rental vacancy rate was 11.9%.

Racial composition as of the 2020 census
Race	Number	Percent
White	1,470	80.6%
Black or African American	3	0.2%
American Indian and Alaska Native	104	5.7%
Asian	4	0.2%
Native Hawaiian and Other Pacific Islander	2	0.1%
Some other race	96	5.3%
Two or more races	145	7.9%
Hispanic or Latino (of any race)	285	15.6%

=== 2000 census ===
As of the census of 2000, there were 1,958 people, 606 households, and 467 families residing in the city. The population density was 757.1 people per square mile (291.9/km^{2}). There were 717 housing units at an average density of 277.2 per square mile (106.9/km^{2}). The racial makeup of the city was 83.09% White, 0.10% African American, 6.44% Native American, 0.87% Asian, 0.15% Pacific Islander, 7.00% from other races, and 2.35% from two or more races. Hispanic or Latino of any race were 13.69% of the population.

There were 606 households, out of which 41.9% had children under the age of 18 living with them, 69.0% were married couples living together, 5.8% had a female householder with no husband present, and 22.8% were non-families. 20.8% of all households were made up of individuals, and 9.4% had someone living alone who was 65 years of age or older. The average household size was 3.09 and the average family size was 3.65.

In the city, the population was spread out, with 36.5% under the age of 18, 7.6% from 18 to 24, 25.7% from 25 to 44, 17.9% from 45 to 64, and 12.3% who were 65 years of age or older. The median age was 30 years. For every 100 females, there were 110.3 males. For every 100 females age 18 and over, there were 108.7 males.

The median income for a household in the city was $35,929, and the median income for a family was $42,115. Males had a median income of $31,000 versus $21,875 for females. The per capita income for the city was $14,033. About 6.7% of families and 8.2% of the population were below the poverty line, including 8.1% of those under age 18 and 6.3% of those age 65 or over.

== Culture ==
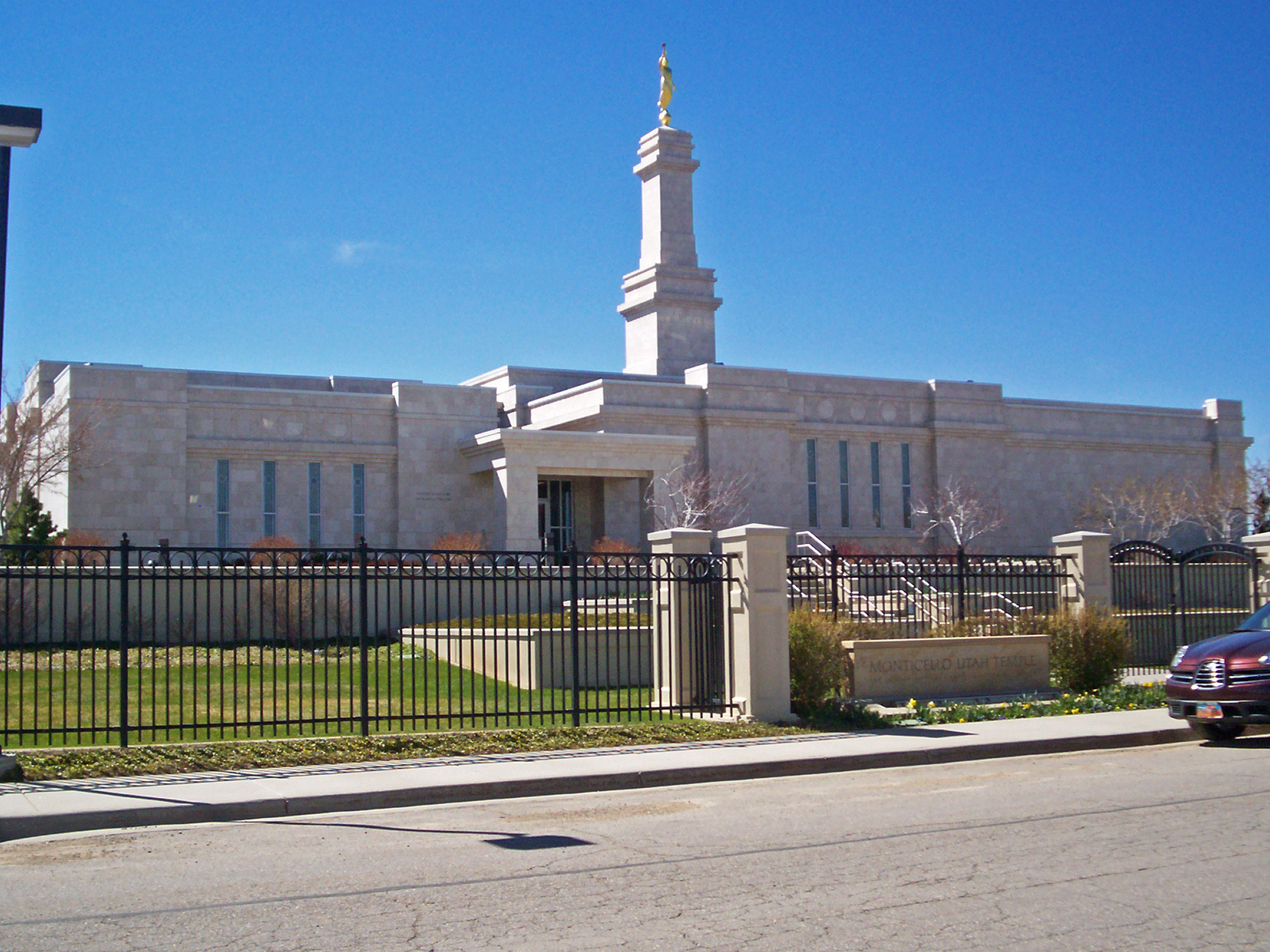
Monticello Utah Temple

As the seat of San Juan County, Monticello is home to the San Juan County Fair and Fairgrounds. The annual fair usually occurs during August. A 24 July Parade and Celebration are also held annually in Monticello to commemorate Pioneer Day, a Utah holiday commemorating the arrival of Mormon settlers to the Salt Lake Valley.

Blue Mountain Entertainment is a local arts organization which provides funding to bring cultural performances to Monticello throughout the year.

The City of Monticello annually hosts the Blue Mountain Triathlon. The 27-mile (43 km) race begins with 4 miles (6.4 km) of cross country skiing on the Blue Mountain, followed by an 18-mile (29 km) bike ride, and ending with a 5-mile (8.0 km) run past Newspaper Rock.

On October 4, 1997, Gordon B. Hinckley, President of The Church of Jesus Christ of Latter-day Saints, announced that the church would begin to build a new series of "miniature temples." The first of such temples was built in Monticello. Groundbreaking began on November 17, 1997. An open house was held from July 15 to July 18, 1998, and the Monticello Utah Temple was dedicated July 26, 1998. The temple was subsequently expanded and rededicated on November 17, 2002. The Monticello Temple was the 53rd temple completed by the church.

== Education ==
The San Juan School District operates two public schools. The Monticello Elementary School hosts children from grades K-6, while grades 7-12 attend Monticello High School. The San Juan County Library is located in Monticello.

Monticello was selected as the site for an extension of the George Wythe University; groundbreaking for the new facility took place in August 2008 but the project was never completed.

== Recreation ==
Monticello is home of The Hideout Golf Club, an 18-hole golf course constructed near the reclaimed site of the uranium mill. The Hideout has been ranked the no. 2 golf course in Utah and the No. 23 Municipal Golf Course in the U.S.

The Abajo Mountains and surrounding areas offer hiking and hunting. Fishing is available at Foy Lake, Monticello Lake, and Lloyds Lake, all on the Blue Mountains.

== See also ==
- Hyland Hotel
- Jane McKechnie Walton
- Lariat Cafe explosion
