= San Juan County, Utah =

County in Utah, United States

- County
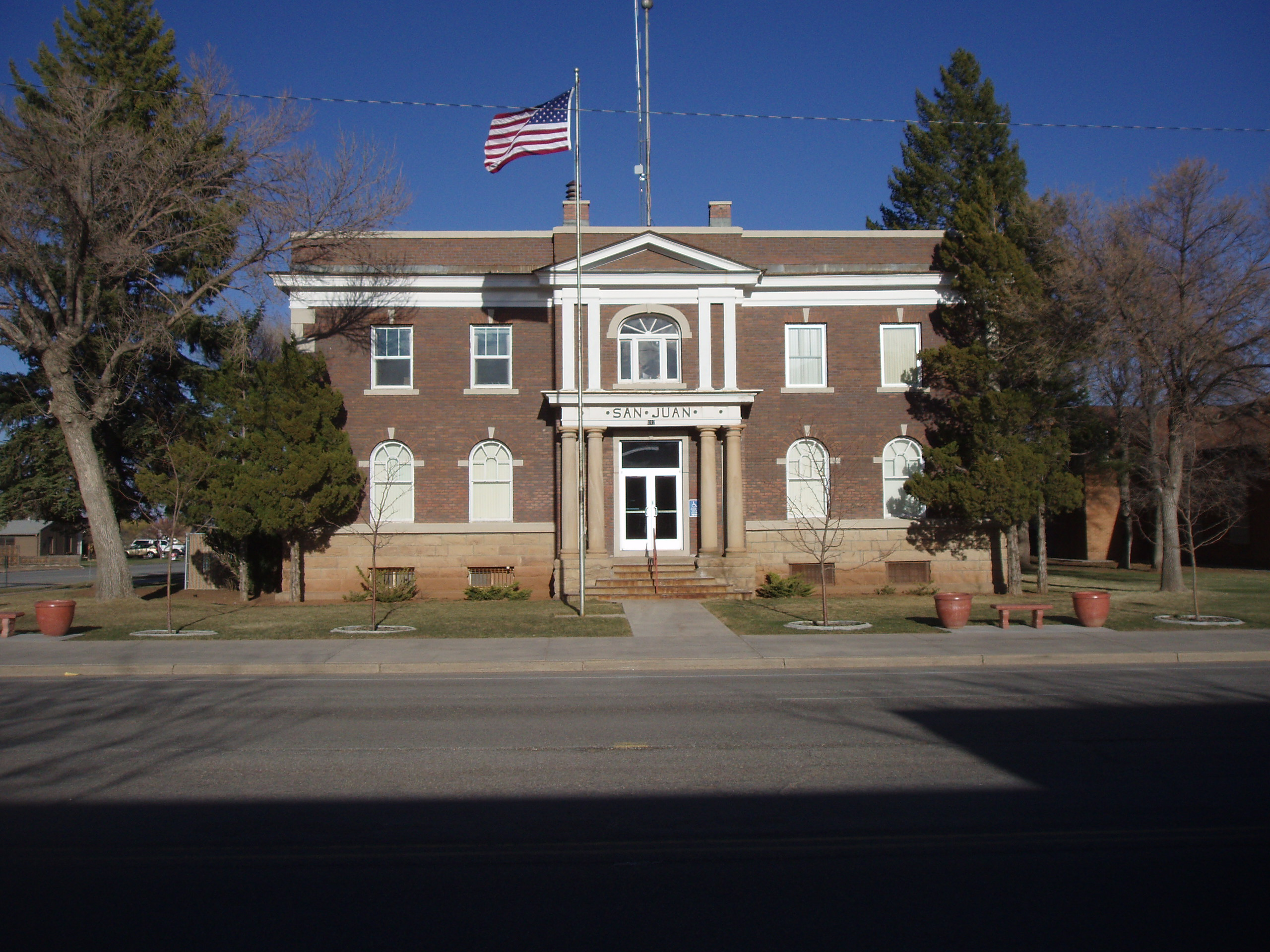
- San Juan County Courthouse, Monticello

- Location within the U.S. state of Utah
- Country: United States
- State: Utah
- Founded: February 17, 1880
- Named for: San Juan River
- Seat: Monticello
- Largest city: Blanding

Area
  - Total: 7,933 sq mi (20,550 km^{2})
  - Land: 7,820 sq mi (20,300 km^{2})
  - Water: 113 sq mi (290 km^{2}) 1.4%

Population (2020)
  - Total: 14,518
  - Estimate (2025): 14,542 ▲
  - Density: 1.86/sq mi (0.717/km^{2})
- Time zone: UTC−7 (Mountain)
  - Summer (DST): UTC−6 (MDT)
- Congressional district: 3rd
- Website: www.sanjuancountyut.gov

San Juan County (/sæn ˈwɑːn/ san-WAHN) is a county in the southeastern portion of the U.S. state of Utah. As of the 2020 United States census, the population was 14,518. Its county seat is Monticello, while its most populous city is Blanding. The Utah State Legislature named the county for the San Juan River, itself named by Spanish explorers (in honor of Saint John). San Juan County borders Arizona, Colorado, and New Mexico at the Four Corners.

== History ==
The Utah Territory authorized the creation of San Juan County on February 17, 1880, with territories annexed from Iron, Kane, and Piute counties. There has been no change in its boundaries since its creation. Monticello was founded in 1887, and by 1895 it was large enough to be designated the seat of San Juan County. On September 13, 2025, two extreme-level tornadoes touched down in the county. One was an EFU, the other was a strong EF2.

== Geography ==
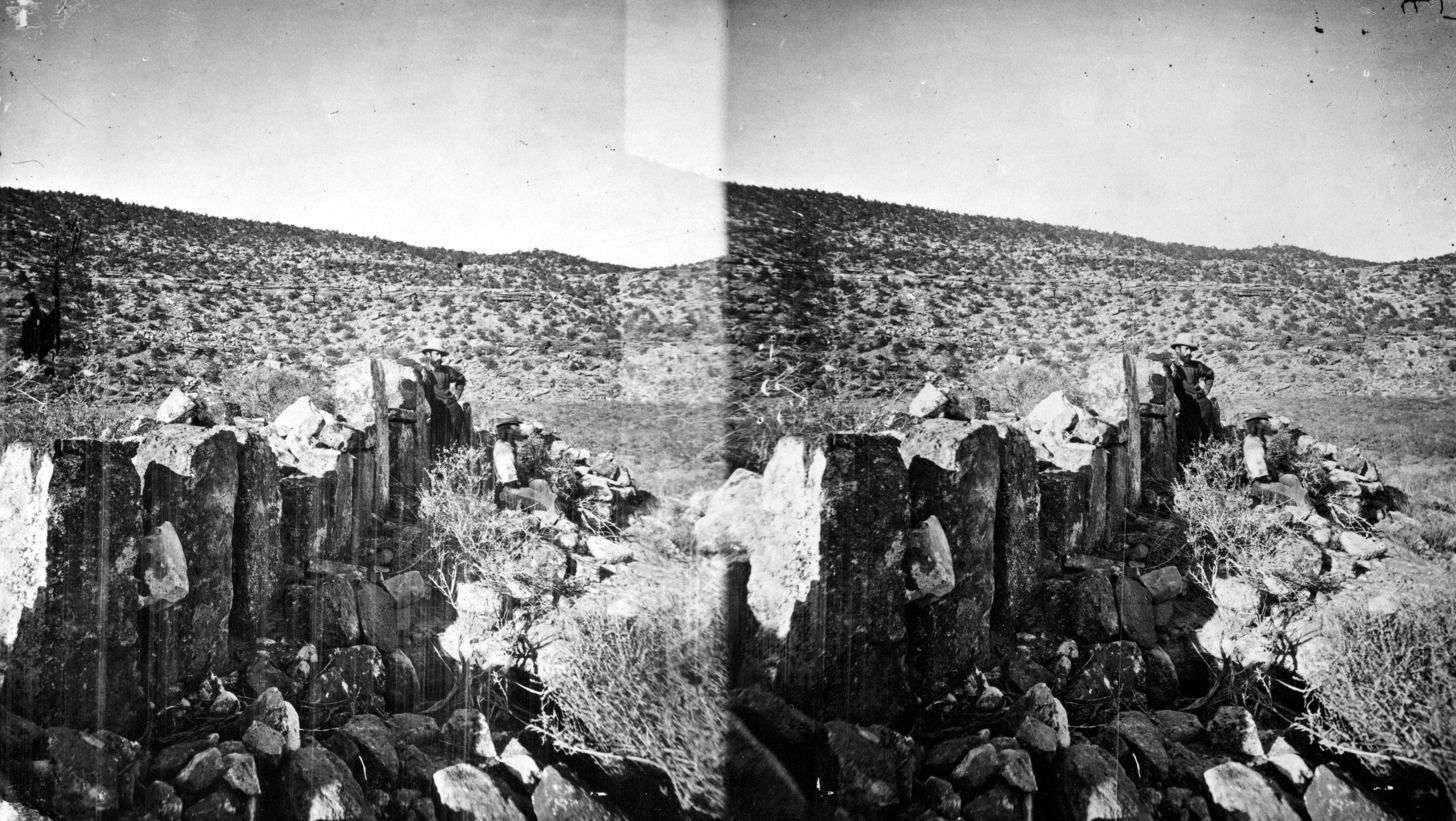
Ruins in Montezuma Canyon with stones of unusual size

San Juan County lies in the southeastern corner of the state of Utah. Its borders coincide with the borders of the states of Colorado, New Mexico, and Arizona with Utah. The convergence point of these borders, Four Corners Monument, is located at the extreme southeastern corner of the county.

The county's terrain generally slopes to the west and the south, with its highest point, Mount Peale, at 12,726 feet (3,879 m) above sea level. The county has a total area of 7,933 square miles (20,550 km^{2}), of which 7,820 square miles (20,300 km^{2}) is land and 113 square miles (290 km^{2}) (1.4%) is water. It is the largest county by area in Utah.

The county's western and southern boundaries lie deep within gorges carved by the Colorado and San Juan Rivers. Tributary canyons, cutting through rock layers of the surrounding deserts, have carved the land up with chasms, cliffs, and plateaus. In the center of the county is Cedar Mesa, Comb Wash, Natural Bridges, and Hovenweep National Monuments. Canyonlands National Park lies mainly within the county borders. The Eastern side of Glen Canyon National Recreation Area / Lake Powell is also in the county.

The Blue (Abajo) Mountains and the La Sal Mountains exceed 12,000 feet (3,700 m) in elevation. Both ranges are covered with lush forests, contrasting the scenery below. The elevation change within the county is from nearly 13,000 feet (4,000 m) in the La Sal Mountains to 3,000 feet (910 m) at Lake Powell, a difference of about 10,000 feet (3,000 m).

The county's towns lie primarily on a north–south axis along U.S. routes 191 and 163 from La Sal in the north to Monument Valley in the south.

=== Natural resources ===
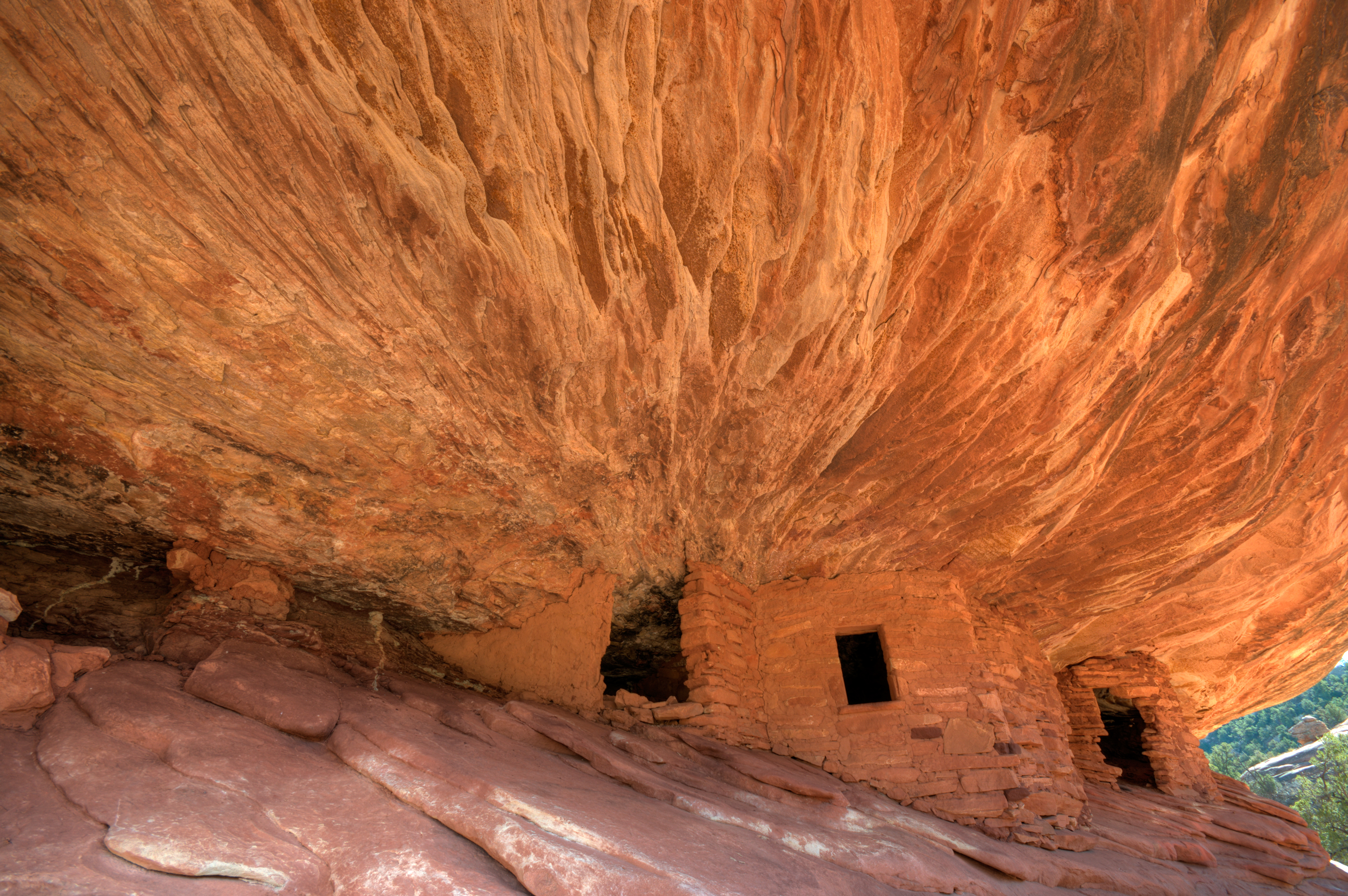
House on Fire ruin, one of many Ancestral Pueblo ruins in the county

In 2018, the only operating uranium processing plant in the United States was located in the town of Blanding; however, the plant was moved to be on standby in 2019.

San Juan County is home to numerous oil and gas fields, including Squaw Canyon Oil Field, that produce primarily from the Desert Creek and Ismay Formations.

=== Major highways ===
- US 163
- US 191
- US 491
- SR-46
- SR-95
- SR-162
- SR-261
- SR-276

=== Adjacent counties ===
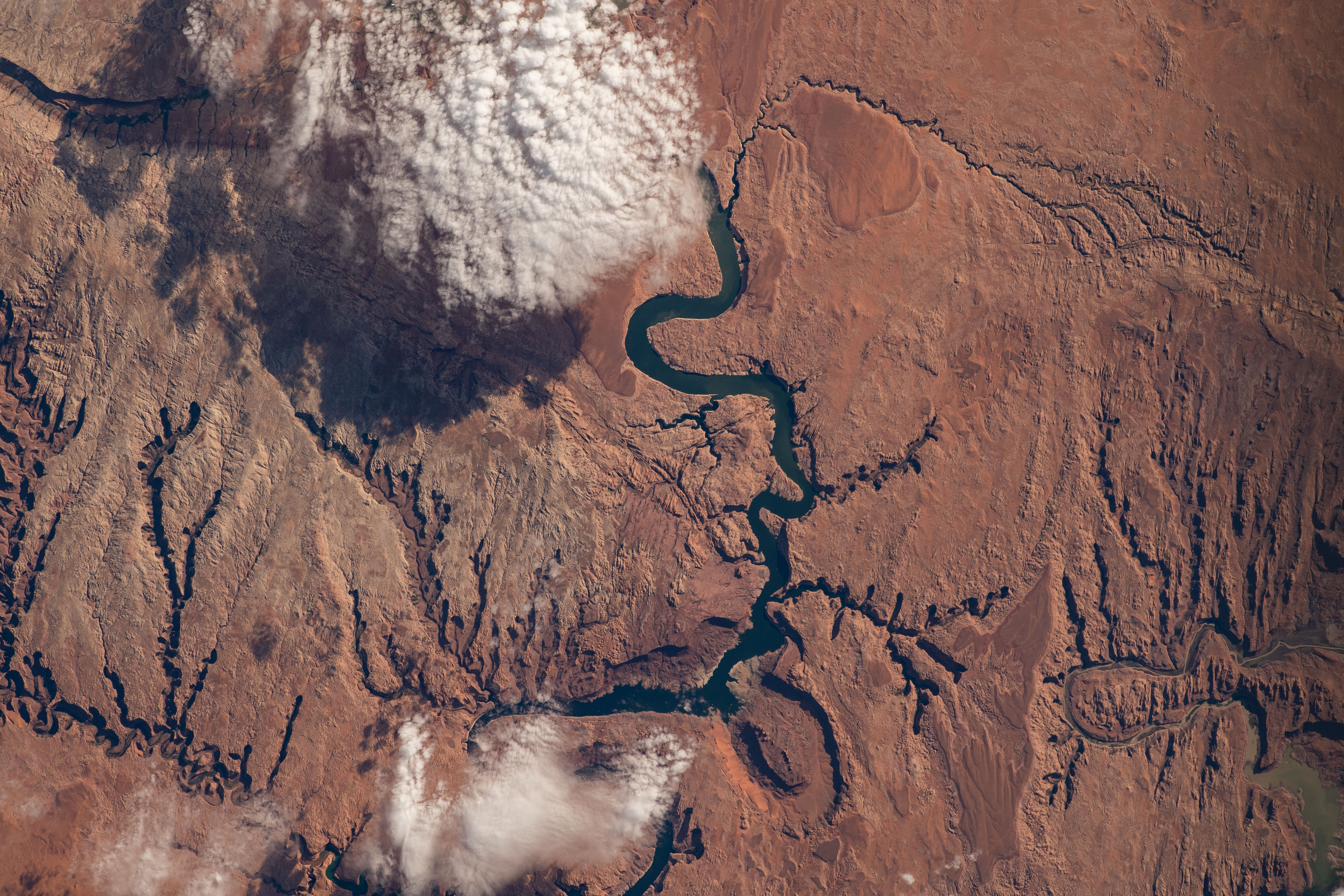
The border between San Juan (right) and Kane (left) counties along Lake Powell, taken July 4, 2022, from the International Space Station

- Grand County - north
- Mesa County, Colorado - northeast
- Montrose County, Colorado - northeast
- San Miguel County, Colorado - east
- Dolores County, Colorado - east
- Montezuma County, Colorado - east
- San Juan County, New Mexico - southeast
- Apache County, Arizona - south
- Navajo County, Arizona - south
- Coconino County, Arizona - southwest
- Kane County - west
- Garfield County - west
- Wayne County - west
- Emery County - northwest

San Juan County is bordered by more counties than any other county in the United States, at 14.

=== Protected areas ===
- Bears Ears National Monument
- Canyonlands National Park (part)
- Dark Canyon Wilderness
- Edge of the Cedars State Park
- Four Corners Monument Navajo Tribal Park (part)
- Glen Canyon National Recreation Area (part)
- Grand Gulch Primitive Area
- Goosenecks State Park
- Hovenweep National Monument (part)
- Manti-La Sal National Forest (part)
- Monument Valley Navajo Tribal Park (part)
- Natural Bridges National Monument
- Navajo Mountain
- Rainbow Bridge National Monument
- Valley of the Gods

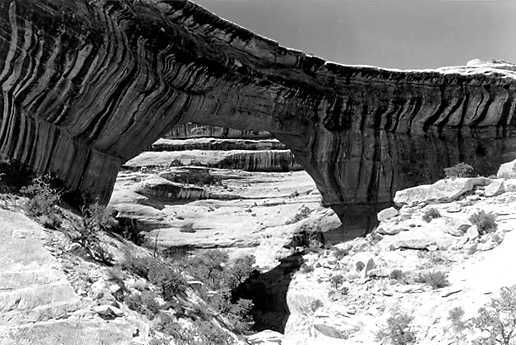
Sipapu Bridge, in Natural Bridges National Monument

== Demographics ==
Historical population
Census	Pop.	Note	%±
1880	204		—
1890	365		78.9%
1900	1,023		180.3%
1910	2,377		132.4%
1920	3,379		42.2%
1930	3,496		3.5%
1940	4,712		34.8%
1950	5,315		12.8%
1960	9,040		70.1%
1970	9,606		6.3%
1980	12,253		27.6%
1990	12,621		3.0%
2000	14,413		14.2%
2010	14,746		2.3%
2020	14,518		−1.5%
2025 (est.)	14,542	▲	0.2%
US Decennial Census; 1790–1960 1900–1990; 1990–2000 2010 2020

As of 2017, San Juan County was the poorest county (per capita) in Utah and one of the poorest in the United States.

=== Racial and ethnic composition ===
San Juan County, Utah – Racial and ethnic composition Note: the US Census treats Hispanic/Latino as an ethnic category. This table excludes Latinos from the racial categories and assigns them to a separate category. Hispanics/Latinos may be of any race.
Race / Ethnicity (NH = Non-Hispanic)	Pop 1980	Pop 1990	Pop 2000	Pop 2010	Pop 2020	% 1980	% 1990	% 2000	% 2010	% 2020
White alone (NH)	6,192	5,347	5,710	6,474	6,038	50.53%	42.37%	39.62%	43.90%	41.59%
Black or African American alone (NH)	11	10	18	21	32	0.09%	0.08%	0.12%	0.14%	0.22%
Native American or Alaska Native alone (NH)	5,600	6,782	7,948	7,308	7,186	45.70%	53.74%	55.14%	49.56%	49.50%
Asian alone (NH)	17	36	25	35	34	0.14%	0.29%	0.17%	0.24%	0.23%
Native Hawaiian or Pacific Islander alone (NH)	x	x	5	5	51	x	x	0.03%	0.03%	0.35%
Other race alone (NH)	0	6	11	2	26	0.00%	0.05%	0.08%	0.01%	0.18%
Mixed race or Multiracial (NH)	x	x	156	252	404	x	x	1.08%	1.71%	2.78%
Hispanic or Latino (any race)	433	440	540	649	747	3.53%	3.49%	3.75%	4.40%	5.15%
Total	12,253	12,621	14,413	14,746	14,518	100.00%	100.00%	100.00%	100.00%	100.00%

=== 2020 census ===
According to the 2020 United States census and 2020 American Community Survey, there were 14,518 people in San Juan County with a population density of 1.9 people per square mile (0.7/km^{2}). Among non-Hispanic or Latino people, the racial makeup was 6,038 (41.6%) White, 32 (0.2%) African American, 7,186 (49.5%) Native American, 34 (0.2%) Asian, 51 (0.4%) Pacific Islander, 26 (0.2%) from other races, and 404 (2.8%) from two or more races. 747 (5.1%) people were Hispanic or Latino.

There were 7,269 (50.07%) males and 7,249 (49.93%) females, and the population distribution by age was 4,176 (28.8%) under the age of 18, 8,104 (55.8%) from 18 to 64, and 2,238 (15.4%) who were at least 65 years old. The median age was 34.6 years.

There were 4,649 households in San Juan County with an average size of 3.12 of which 3,397 (73.1%) were families and 1,252 (26.9%) were non-families. Among all families, 2,359 (50.7%) were married couples, 317 (6.8%) were male householders with no spouse, and 721 (15.5%) were female householders with no spouse. Among all non-families, 1,070 (23.0%) were a single person living alone and 182 (3.9%) were two or more people living together. 1,848 (39.8%) of all households had children under the age of 18. 3,708 (79.8%) of households were owner-occupied while 941 (20.2%) were renter-occupied.

The median income for a San Juan County household was $49,690 and the median family income was $57,401, with a per-capita income of $20,088. The median income for males that were full-time employees was $48,259 and for females $34,092. 22.8% of the population and 18.1% of families were below the poverty line.

In terms of education attainment, out of the 9,192 people in San Juan County 25 years or older, 1,313 (14.3%) had not completed high school, 2,801 (30.5%) had a high school diploma or equivalency, 3,316 (36.1%) had some college or associate degree, 1,156 (12.6%) had a bachelor's degree, and 606 (6.6%) had a graduate or professional degree.

=== 2010 census ===
As of the 2010 United States census, there were 14,746 people and 4,505 households in San Juan County. The racial and ethnic composition of the population was 50.4% Native American, 45.8% White, 0.3% Asian, 0.2% African American and 2.3% reporting two or more races. 4.4% of the population was Hispanic or Latino of any race.

== Politics and government ==
San Juan County has supported Republican presidents since voting for Wendell Willkie in 1940. It supported a Democrat for president in 1896 (William Jennings Bryan), 1916 (Woodrow Wilson), and 1936 (Franklin D. Roosevelt). Though a Republican vote currently secures elections, the area has voted less Republican than the rest of Utah in many national elections. In 2004, for example, George W. Bush won 60.02% in San Juan County versus 71.54% in the state. In 2020, Democrat Joe Biden needed 6.13% more votes to win the county from Donald Trump, who secured 51.2% in the county as opposed to 58.13% in the state as a whole. The county is more competitive at the state level due to its high Native American population, which leans Democratic. Notably, the county voted for the Democratic candidates in the 1988 and 2000 gubernatorial elections, both of which Republican candidates won.

Federally mandated commissioner districts put many Navajo voters in one district. The San Juan County Board of Commissioners has been majority white for many years. In 2016, a Federal District Court decision found voting districts violated the 1965 Voting Rights Act and the U.S. Constitution. Before the 2016 court decision, the county used an at-large voting system to elect commissioners.

In 2018, the first-ever majority-Navajo commission was seated. Two of the three county commissioners, Willie Grayeyes and Kenneth Maryboy, are board members of Utah Diné Bikeyah, which supported the creation of Bears Ears National Monument. In a 2019 special election, Proposition 10, which would have changed the structure of the county government to include five county commissioners, was blocked needing 153 more popular votes. The proposition, spearheaded by Blanding Mayor Joe Lyman, was characterized by opponents as an effort to undermine the Navajo-majority county commission. Mayor Joe Lyman characterized the proposition as a way to restore representation to Blanding, the county's largest city. He states, "I don't like how we arrived at the commissioners we have because it felt like a judicial appointment," and that "the vote is very evenly split."

As of March 2020, efforts were underway to bring municipal water and electrical service to the 29-home Diné (Navajo) community of Westwater, which has existed for decades with neither just outside the city limits of Blanding.

State elected offices
Position	District	Name	Affiliation	First elected
Senate	27	David Hinkins	Republican	2008
House of Representatives	73	Phil Lyman	Republican	2018
Board of Education	14	Mark Huntsman	Nonpartisan	2014

United States presidential election results for San Juan County, Utah
Year	Republican		Democratic		Third party(ies)	
Year	No.	%	No.	%	No.	%
1896	8	4.57%	167	95.43%	0	0.00%
1900	81	51.92%	72	46.15%	3	1.92%
1904	135	78.49%	36	20.93%	1	0.58%
1908	130	53.06%	109	44.49%	6	2.45%
1912	146	37.24%	146	37.24%	100	25.51%
1916	213	31.51%	448	66.27%	15	2.22%
1920	523	64.81%	260	32.22%	24	2.97%
1924	380	56.89%	232	34.73%	56	8.38%
1928	449	65.55%	231	33.72%	5	0.73%
1932	460	48.94%	459	48.83%	21	2.23%
1936	432	44.95%	520	54.11%	9	0.94%
1940	528	50.43%	515	49.19%	4	0.38%
1944	513	58.23%	367	41.66%	1	0.11%
1948	558	56.77%	418	42.52%	7	0.71%
1952	876	67.54%	421	32.46%	0	0.00%
1956	1,119	72.47%	425	27.53%	0	0.00%
1960	1,408	62.72%	837	37.28%	0	0.00%
1964	1,371	57.99%	993	42.01%	0	0.00%
1968	1,393	59.66%	680	29.12%	262	11.22%
1972	1,893	68.27%	677	24.41%	203	7.32%
1976	1,856	57.60%	1,182	36.69%	184	5.71%
1980	2,774	76.00%	763	20.90%	113	3.10%
1984	2,598	69.13%	1,145	30.47%	15	0.40%
1988	2,377	61.95%	1,407	36.67%	53	1.38%
1992	2,004	46.23%	1,639	37.81%	692	15.96%
1996	2,139	51.36%	1,675	40.22%	351	8.43%
2000	2,721	57.36%	1,838	38.74%	185	3.90%
2004	2,971	60.02%	1,906	38.51%	73	1.47%
2008	2,638	51.42%	2,406	46.90%	86	1.68%
2012	3,074	57.92%	2,139	40.31%	94	1.77%
2016	2,645	47.80%	2,042	36.90%	847	15.31%
2020	3,535	51.40%	3,113	45.26%	230	3.34%
2024	3,613	57.09%	2,581	40.78%	135	2.13%

== Communities ==
=== Cities ===
- Blanding
- Monticello (county seat)

=== Town ===
- Bluff

=== Census-designated places ===
- Aneth
- Halchita
- Halls Crossing
- La Sal
- Mexican Hat
- Montezuma Creek
- Navajo Mountain
- Oljato-Monument Valley
- Spanish Valley
- Tselakai Dezza
- White Mesa

=== Unincorporated communities ===
- Eastland
- Ucolo

== See also ==
- List of counties in Utah
- National Register of Historic Places listings in San Juan County, Utah
