= National Register of Historic Places listings in San Juan County, Utah =

Location of San Juan County in Utah

This is a list of the National Register of Historic Places listings in San Juan County, Utah.

This is intended to be a complete list of the properties and districts on the National Register of Historic Places in San Juan County, Utah, United States. Latitude and longitude coordinates are provided for many National Register properties and districts; these locations may be seen together in a map.

There are 40 properties and districts listed on the National Register in the county, including 1 National Historic Landmark.

This National Park Service list is complete through NPS recent listings posted October 23, 2026.

== Current listings ==
	Name on the Register	Image	Date listed	Location	City or town	Description
1	Joseph Frederick Adams House	Joseph Frederick Adams House	October 24, 1985 (#85003390)	Approximately 150 N. 700 East; 37°17′04″N 109°33′00″W	Bluff	House built from red stone blocks; renovated since listing.
2	Alkali Ridge	Alkali Ridge	October 15, 1966 (#66000740)	Along County Road 204 (Alkali Point Rd.), south of Monticello; 37°40′50″N 109°22′40″W	Monticello	A major proto-Pueblo archaeological site
3	Aneth Terrace Archeological District	Aneth Terrace Archeological District	August 1, 1980 (#80003937)	Address Restricted	Aneth	
4	Big Westwater Ruin	Big Westwater Ruin	July 16, 1980 (#80003938)	Address Restricted	Blanding	
5	Bluff Historic District	Bluff Historic District	November 2, 1995 (#95001273)	Roughly bounded by Main St., U.S. Route 191, 2nd E. St., and the bluffs 37°17′16″N 109°33′03″W	Bluff	
6	Butler Wash Archeological District	Butler Wash Archeological District	July 11, 1981 (#81000584)	Address Restricted	Blanding	
7	Carhart Pueblo	Carhart Pueblo	July 7, 2015 (#15000401)	Address Restricted	Monticello	
8	Cave Springs Cowboy Camp	Cave Springs Cowboy Camp	October 7, 1988 (#88001233)	Cave Springs vicinity 38°09′34″N 109°45′12″W	Moab	In the Needles district of Canyonlands National Park
9	James Bean Decker House	James Bean Decker House	August 4, 1983 (#83003180)	189 N. 300 East; 37°17′07″N 109°33′27″W	Bluff	House built by Mormon pioneers to hold large family.
10	Coal Bed Village Site	Coal Bed Village Site	March 26, 2018 (#100002234)	Address Restricted	Blanding vicinity	
11	Defiance House	Defiance House	December 20, 1978 (#78000347)	Address Restricted	Blanding	
12	Edge of Cedars Indian Ruin	Edge of Cedars Indian Ruin	August 12, 1971 (#71000853)	West of Blanding; 37°37′48″N 109°29′20″W	Blanding	Part of the Edge of the Cedars State Park Museum
13	Goulding's Trading Post	Goulding's Trading Post	October 20, 1980 (#80003941)	Off State Route 47; 37°00′24″N 110°12′09″W	Gouldings	A lodge, trading post, and museum located just north of the Arizona–Utah border, adjacent to the Navajo Tribal Park in Monument Valley.
14	Grand Gulch Archeological District	Grand Gulch Archeological District	June 14, 1982 (#82004154)	Address Restricted	Blanding	
15	Hole-in-the-Rock Trail	Hole-in-the-Rock Trail	August 9, 1982 (#82004792)	A trail commencing at Escalante and terminating at Bluff; 37°25′18″N 110°39′51″W	Escalante	Split between Garfield, Kane, and San Juan counties
16	Hyland Hotel	Hyland Hotel	July 28, 1994 (#94000785)	116 S. 100 West; 37°52′14″N 109°20′38″W	Monticello	A Craftsman Style bungalow
17	Indian Creek State Park	Indian Creek State Park	March 15, 1976 (#76001833)	14 miles (23 km) north of Monticello; 37°59′18″N 109°31′00″W	Monticello	Also known as Newspaper Rock State Historic Monument since 1961
18	Frederick Isaac and Mary M. Jones House	Frederick Isaac and Mary M. Jones House	August 14, 2003 (#03000154)	117 E. 200 South; 37°52′N 109°20′W	Monticello	
19	Julien Inscription		October 7, 1988 (#88001248)	Lower Red Lake vicinity 38°09′16″N 109°55′32″W	Moab	Rock-carved graffito reportedly left by French-American trapper Denis Julien
20	Kirk's Cabin Complex	Kirk's Cabin Complex	October 7, 1988 (#88001252)	Upper Salt Walsh; 37°59′16″N 109°44′27″W	Moab	A log cabin and corrals built circa 1890, located in present-day Canyonlands National Park
21	Lost Canyon Cowboy Camp	Lost Canyon Cowboy Camp	October 7, 1988 (#88001232)	Lost Canyon vicinity 38°08′13″N 109°45′32″W	Moab	
22	Moon House Complex	Moon House Complex	November 20, 2017 (#100001830)	Address Restricted	Blanding vicinity	
23	Murphy Trail and Bridge	Murphy Trail and Bridge	October 7, 1988 (#88001236)	Murphy Point vicinity 38°20′37″N 109°52′15″W	Moab	Livestock trail located in what is now Canyonlands National Park; the original bridge was replaced a decade after the site was NRHP-listed
24	Natural Bridges Archeological District	Natural Bridges Archeological District	August 3, 2004 (#04000784)	Address Restricted	Blanding	
25	Natural Bridges National Monument Visitor Center		August 18, 2023 (#100009283)	Natural Bridges Entrance Rd. / UT 275; 37°36′32″N 109°58′39″W	Natural Bridges National Monument	
26	Navajo Mountain Day School and Community Center Historic District		January 28, 2021 (#100006063)	300 yds. west of jct. of Cty. Rds. 434 and 488; 37°01′00″N 110°47′47″W	Navajo Mountain	
27	Neck and Cabin Springs Grazing Area		December 18, 2009 (#09001108)	Grand View Point Rd. 38°25′09″N 109°50′04″W	Moab	
28	Jens Nielson House	Jens Nielson House	February 22, 1982 (#82004155)	600 E. Black Locust Ave. 37°17′05″N 109°32′23″W	Bluff	
29	Oljato Trading Post	Oljato Trading Post	June 20, 1980 (#80003939)	Southwest of Blanding; 37°02′11″N 110°19′03″W	Blanding	
30	Owachomo Bridge Trail	Owachomo Bridge Trail	February 2, 1989 (#88001166)	Armstrong Canyon; 37°34′49″N 110°00′49″W	Blanding	
31	Nancy Patterson Site	Nancy Patterson Site	November 21, 1980 (#80004495)	Address Restricted	Blanding	
32	Poncho House	Poncho House	October 10, 1975 (#75001821)	Address Restricted	Mexican Hat	
33	Rainbow Bridge Traditional Cultural Property	Rainbow Bridge Traditional Cultural Property	March 27, 2017 (#100000816)	Near Lake Powell; 37°04′38″N 110°57′51″W	Navajo Mountain	
34	Lemuel H. Redd Jr. House	Lemuel H. Redd Jr. House	May 18, 1983 (#83003181)	300 E. Mulberry Ave. 37°17′06″N 109°33′16″W	Bluff	Substantial house built in 1900, a step up from earlier log houses in the area.
35	St. Christopher's Episcopal Mission	St. Christopher's Episcopal Mission	November 18, 2002 (#02001042)	Mission Road (SR-162), east of Bluff; 37°17′06″N 109°30′49″W	Bluff vicinity	
36	Salt Creek Archeological District	Salt Creek Archeological District	March 31, 1975 (#75000164)	Address Restricted	Monticello	
37	Sand Island Petroglyph Site	Sand Island Petroglyph Site	July 11, 1981 (#81000585)	Address Restricted	Bluff vicinity	
38	John Albert Scorup House	John Albert Scorup House	April 13, 1983 (#83003182)	210 N. 700 East; 37°17′09″N 109°32′57″W	Bluff	
39	Swallow's Nest	Swallow's Nest	February 23, 1996 (#96000164)	2 N. Grayson Parkway; 37°37′30″N 109°28′18″W	Blanding	One-room sandstone building on the Nicklovis Ranch, built in 1925
40	Westwater Canyon Archeological District	Westwater Canyon Archeological District	September 4, 1980 (#80003940)	Address Restricted	Blanding	

== See also ==
- List of National Historic Landmarks in Utah
- National Register of Historic Places listings in Utah
