= Bluff Historic District =

Historic district in Utah, United States

- U.S. National Register of Historic Places
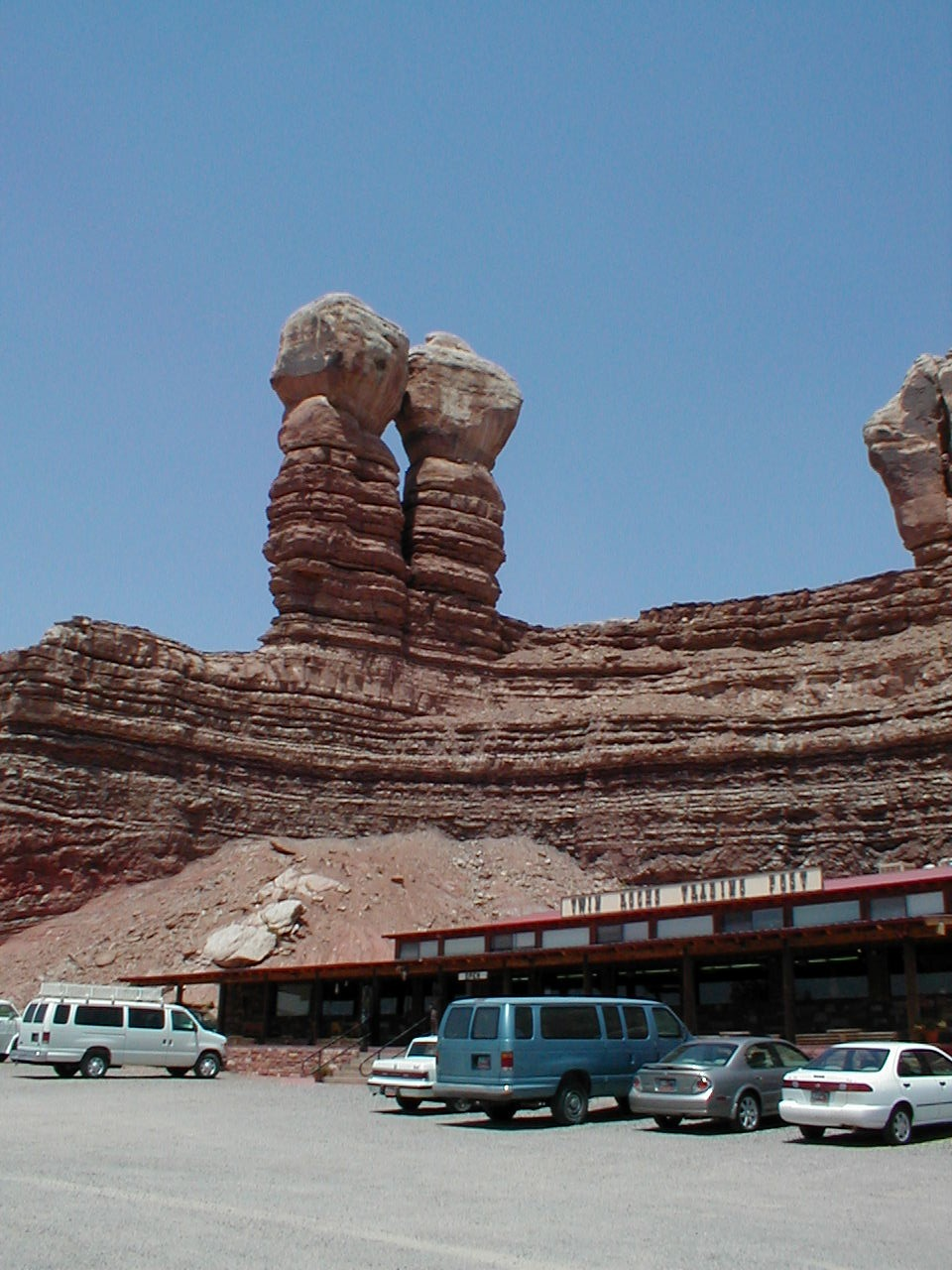
- Navaho Twin Rocks and the Twin Rocks Trading Post

- Location within Utah Location within the United States
- Location: Roughly bounded by Main St., US 191, 2nd E. St., and the bluffs, Bluff, Utah
- Coordinates: 37°17′16″N 109°33′03″W
- Area: 225 acres (91 ha)
- Built: 1880
- Architectural style: Late Victorian
- NRHP reference No.: 95001273
- Added to NRHP: November 2, 1995

The Bluff Historic District, in Bluff, Utah, is a 225 acres (91 ha) historic district which was listed on the National Register of Historic Places in 1995. The district included 11 contributing buildings and six contributing sites.

The district is roughly bounded by Main St., U.S. Route 191, 2nd E. St., and the bluffs.

The district includes a total of 11 or 16 contributing buildings (Note: The NRHP document states in one place that 11 contributing buildings plus six contributing sites are included, in another that there are 42 buildings in the district. Elsewhere it states that there are 16 contributing buildings amidst 46 total buildings in the district.) and six contributing sites, including five properties already separately listed on the National Register. The contributing buildings are:

- Joseph Frederick Adams House (1898), 37.284376°N 109.550039°W

separately NRHP-listed. Was deteriorated and vacant in 1995. Renovated since.

- James Bean Decker House (1898), 37.285291°N 109.557573°W, separately NRHP-listed
- Jens Nielson House, on Black Locust Avenue, separately NRHP-listed
- Lemuel H. Redd, Jr. House, separately NRHP-listed (photo #1)
- John Albert Scorup House, on 7th East Street, separately NRHP-listed
- the old IDS Tithing House/Powell Trading Post, the only contributing building constructed not as a residence (others have been converted)
- Kumen Jones House ruin; the house burned in the 1970s
- Barton Cabin on 5th East Street
- Hall House
- Richmond House
- Willard Butt House, on Mulberry Avenue
- Lyman House, on Mulberry Avenue

The six sites are:

- Navajo Twin Rocks, a natural formation (37.287824°N 109.547699°W
- "The Ballroom", or Bluff Ballroom, an alcove in the cliffs, site of dances and other gatherings
- Bluff Pioneer Cemetery, on a hill north of town, between town and the bluffs (37.287738°N 109.554720°W
- Locomotive Rock, a natural formation
- Calf Canyon, or at least its entrance
- the bluffs north of town

The district includes 30 non-contributing buildings.

The town's historic commercial and institutional buildings have all been demolished, including its school, church, and co-op store.

The Twin Rocks Trading Post, below the Navajo Twin Rocks, is outside of the district. The trading post is well known for Navajo basket and rug weaving, including those designed by artist Damian Jim.
