= Alkali Ridge =

- U.S. National Register of Historic Places
- U.S. National Historic Landmark District
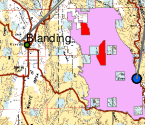
- Extract from a BLM map of eastern Utah; the National Historic Landmark is shown in red

- Location within Utah Location within the United States
- Location: San Juan County, Utah, USA
- Nearest city: Blanding, Utah
- Coordinates: 37.7307°N 109.41099°W
- Area: 2,340 acres (950 ha)
- NRHP reference No.: 66000740

Significant dates
- Added to NRHP: October 15, 1966
- Designated NHLD: July 19, 1964

Alkali Ridge, also known as Alkali Point, is a set of widely scattered archaeological remains of the earliest forms of Puebloan architecture, representing a period of transition from scattered, pit-style dwellings to a settled agricultural lifestyle.

== Description ==
These multi-story buildings and kivas have yielded high-quality ceramics, and form the type location for the Pueblo II period (c. 900 CE – c. 1100 CE). The landmarked areas are noted for the density of archaeological materials, with an average density of 200 sites per square mile across the 2,340-acre (950 ha) area. These resources provide an important view of the transitions of early inhabitants from pit houses to pueblos, because there are examples of all of the major forms between them. Its most important sites were first excavated in the 1930s. It was declared a National Historic Landmark in 1964.

Cacao residue was detected in Site 13 ceramics after testing by University of Pennsylvania and Bristol-Meyers Squibb researchers.

"At Alkali Ridge there are faint marks of an ancient road, likely a trade route that connected this settlement to trading and cultural partners beyond."

== Bears Ears ==
The Bears Ears Inter-Tribal Coalition (BEITC), which was formed in 2015 with representatives from the Hopi, Navajo, Ute Mountain Ute, Pueblo of Zuni, and Ute Indian Tribes submitted a report that led to the creation of Bears Ears National Monument which included Alkali Ridge as one of six "cultural special management areas" along with the Hole-in-the-Rock Historical Trail and the Grand Gulch, Big Westwater Ruin, Dance Hall Rock, Sand Island Petroglyph Panel, the Newspaper Rock Petroglyph Panel, and the Butler Wash Archaeological District National Register site.

== See also ==
- List of National Historic Landmarks in Utah
- National Register of Historic Places listings in San Juan County, Utah
