= Jane McKechnie Walton =

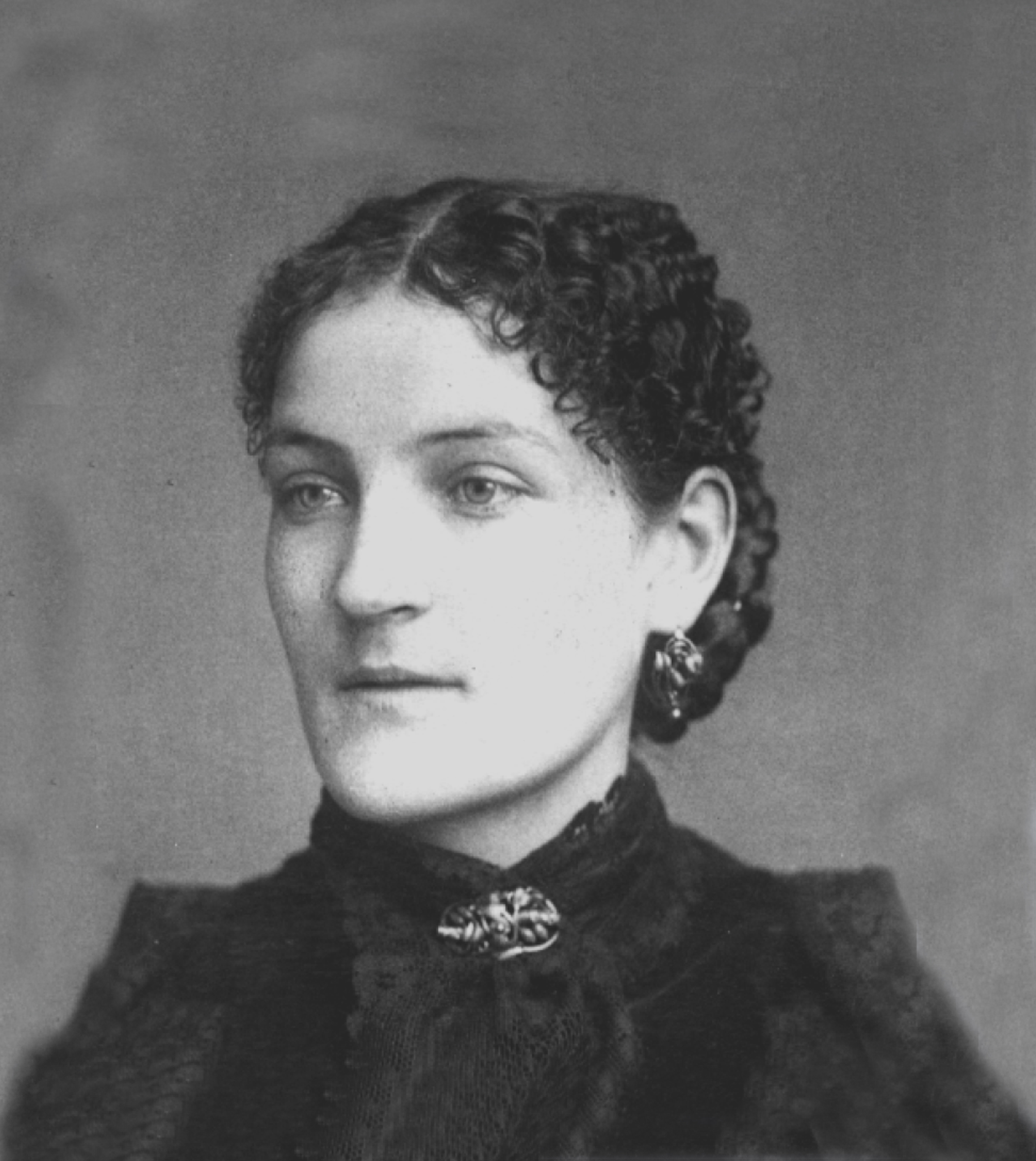
- Jane McKechnie Walton, from a family collection.
- Born: July 16, 1846; Edinburgh
- Died: July 24, 1891; Monticello, Utah
- Other names: Jane Hatch Walton (using her stepfather's surname as her maiden name)
- Known for: Mormon pioneer in Utah

Jane McKechnie Walton (July 16, 1846 – July 24, 1891) was a Scottish-born Mormon pioneer who helped to settle several Utah towns.

== Early life ==
Jane McKechnie was born in Edinburgh, the daughter of Jane (Jean Tinto) Bee and John McKechnie. Her father was a bell moulder by trade and died of typhoid on January 3, 1848 when Jane was 18 months old. Her grieving mother gave birth to the McKechnie's only son a few months later. Jane's mother was taught about the Church of Jesus Christ of Latter-day Saints (LDS Church) by two Mormon missionaries. She was baptized into the LDS Church on February 21, 1850. Several months later, Jane's grandmother, uncle and aunt also joined the newfound religion. The family moved to the United States by the end of 1850.

Her mother worked in and around St. Louis, and remarried to Ira Stearns Hatch, before joining Thomas Howell Wagon Company in 1852. The company traveled 1,100 miles across the American plains, with six-year-old Jane McKechnie walking most of the way barefooted. They arrived in the Salt Lake Valley with other Mormon pioneers in September 1852. While living in Salt Lake City and Bountiful, Utah, young Jane witnessed the Utah War.

== Settling Utah ==
Jane McKechnie Walton and her husband obeyed a call from LDS Church president Brigham Young to settle the Woodruff, Utah area. After several years in Woodruff, the Waltons were called to join other pioneers in settling the Four Corners area of southeastern Utah.

On the way to the Four Corners, the Waltons and others encountered what is known today as the Grand Staircase–Escalante National Monument. They were trapped at the cliff's edge of a place called Hole in the Rock through the winter. In a trip that was supposed to take six weeks, the pioneers spent nearly 6 months blasting and cutting their way through the steep canyon wall. Once through, they lowered their wagons and 1,000 head of cattle down the nearly vertical 2,000 foot cliff to the Colorado River basin below.

The Waltons joined the members of the Hole in the Rock expedition in settling a valley surrounded by red rock cliffs named Bluff, Utah. Within a few years, Jane's husband Charles was asked to travel 40 miles north and homestead a place that eventually became Monticello, Utah. There, the Waltons joined six other families in developing the town. She was president of the San Juan Stake Relief Society, from 1883 to 1891, and traveled around San Juan County in her work.

== Personal life ==
Jane McKechnie married Charles Eugene Walton, Sr. on February 22, 1867. They had three children, Charles Jr. (1868–1947), Magnolia (1869–1918), and Leona (1871–1942). She died on July 24, 1891, aged 45 years, when she was shot and killed during a statehood celebration. Jane McKechnie Walton was the first person buried in the Monticello, Utah cemetery. In 2010, a descendant of Walton's wrote a book about her.
