= Joseph Frederick Adams House =

- U.S. National Register of Historic Places
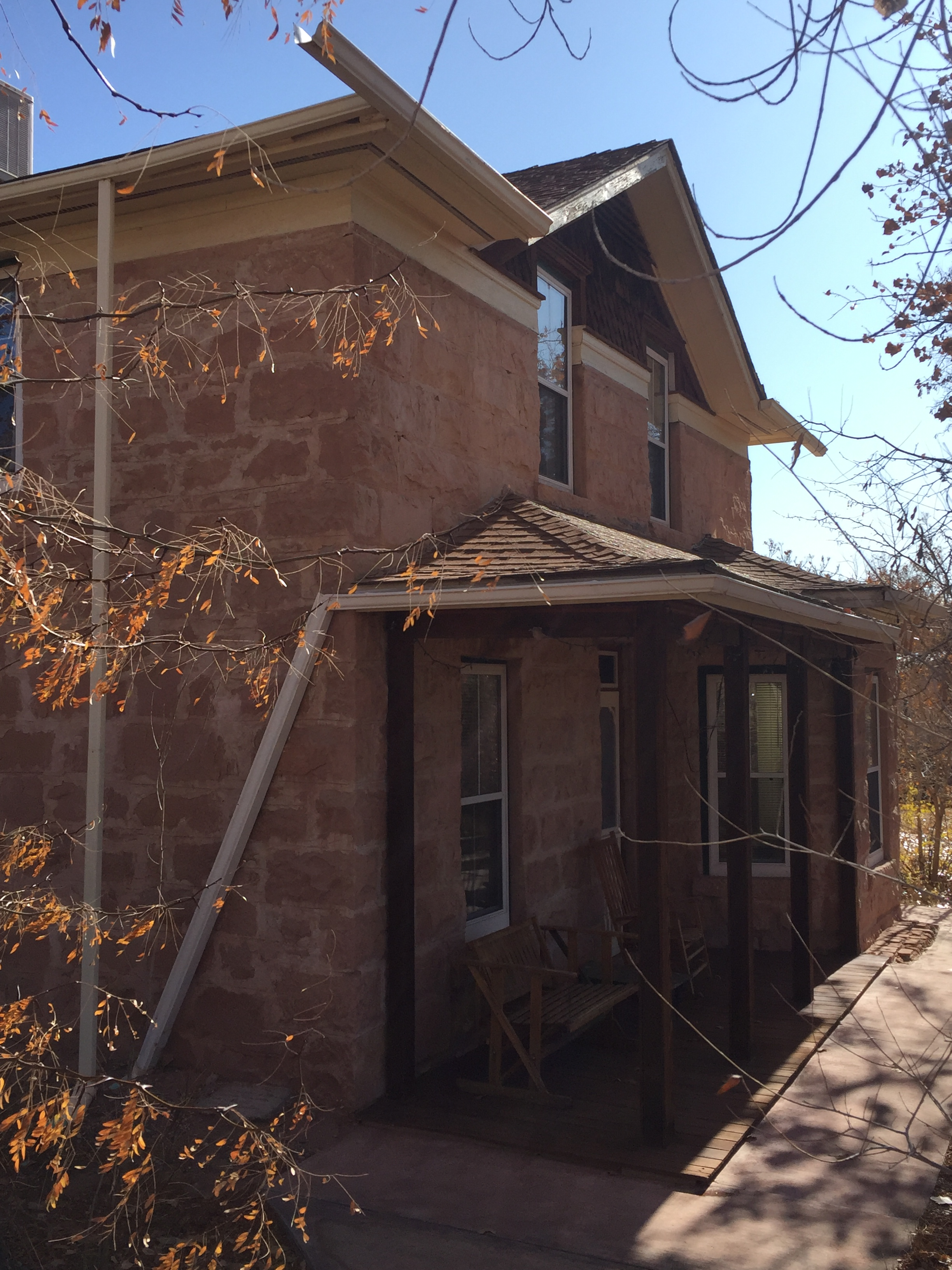

- Location within Utah Location within the United States
- Location: Off US 163, Bluff, Utah
- Coordinates: 37.284376°N 109.550039°W
- Area: less than one acre
- Built: 1895
- Architectural style: Box Style house
- Part of: Bluff Historic District (ID95001273)
- NRHP reference No.: 85003390
- Added to NRHP: October 24, 1985

The Joseph Frederick Adams House, at approximately 150 N. 700 East off U.S. Route 163), in Bluff, Utah, was built in 1895. It was listed on the National Register of Historic Places in 1985. It is also a contributing building in the National Register-listed Bluff Historic District.

It is reportedly one of only two "Box Style" houses in southeastern Utah. When listed in 1985 it was in deteriorated condition.

By 2019 it has been renovated. Reportedly one corner was broken away and the owner rebuilt it brick by brick.

As of 2019, the restored house is available for rental by the day or week, via Recapture Lodge, a local hotel/motel about four blocks away.
