= Jens Nielson House =

- U.S. National Register of Historic Places
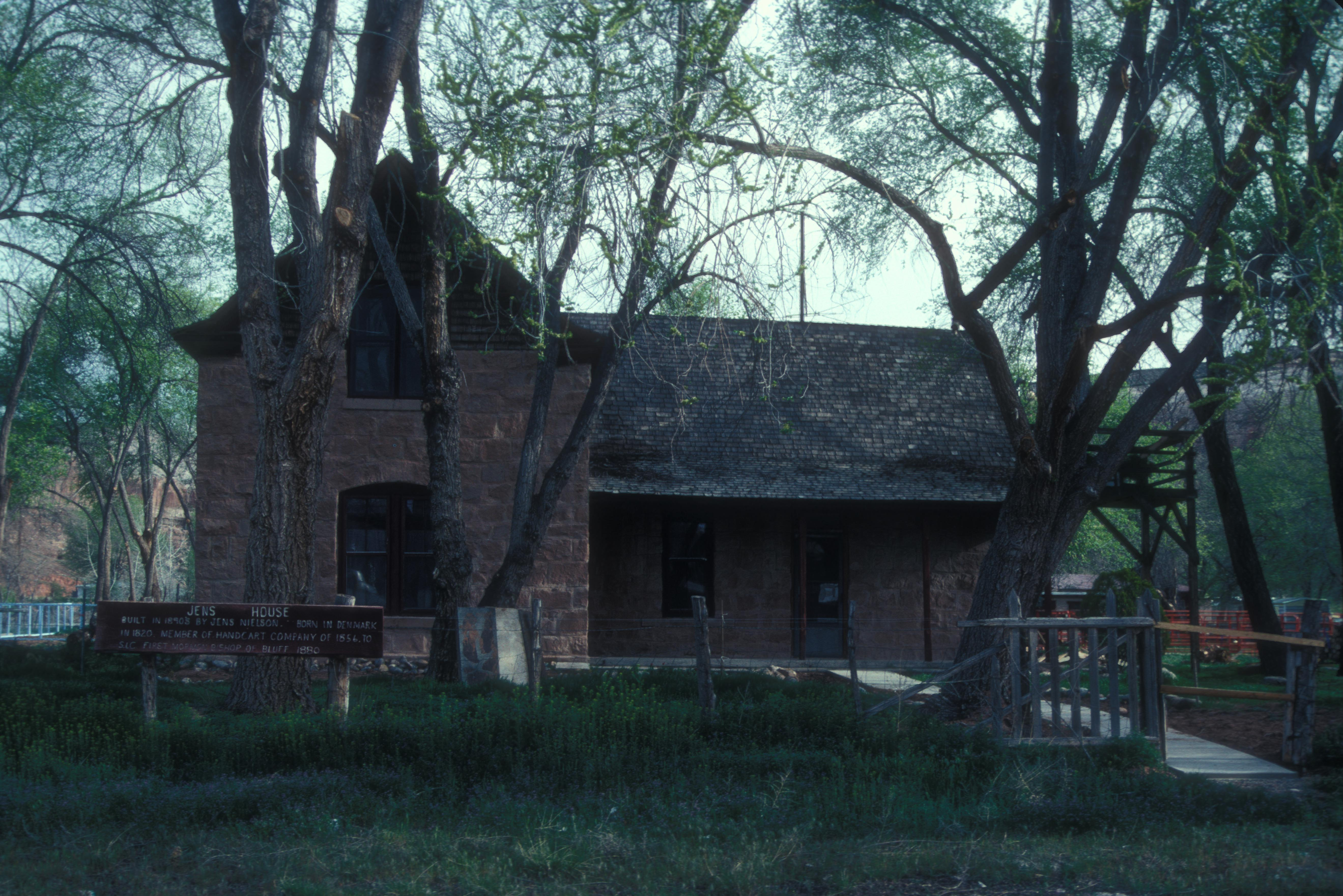
- The house in 2007

- Location within Utah Location within the United States
- Location: Off UT 47, Bluff, Utah
- Coordinates: 37°17′05″N 109°32′23″W
- Area: less than one acre
- Built: 1890
- Architectural style: Gothic, Vernacular Victorian
- NRHP reference No.: 82004155
- Added to NRHP: February 22, 1982

The Jens Nielson House is a historic house in Bluff, Utah. It was built in 1890 for Jens Nielson, an immigrant from Denmark who converted to the Church of Jesus Christ of Latter-day Saints and arrived in the United States with his wife, née Elsie Rasmussen, in 1856. Nielson moved to San Juan County, Utah in 1879, and he served as the bishop of Bluffdale for 26 years. His house was designed in the Gothic Revival and Vernacular Victorian styles. It has been listed on the National Register of Historic Places since February 22, 1982.
