= Goulding's Lodge =

Historic site in Utah, United States

- Goulding's Trading Post
- U.S. National Register of Historic Places
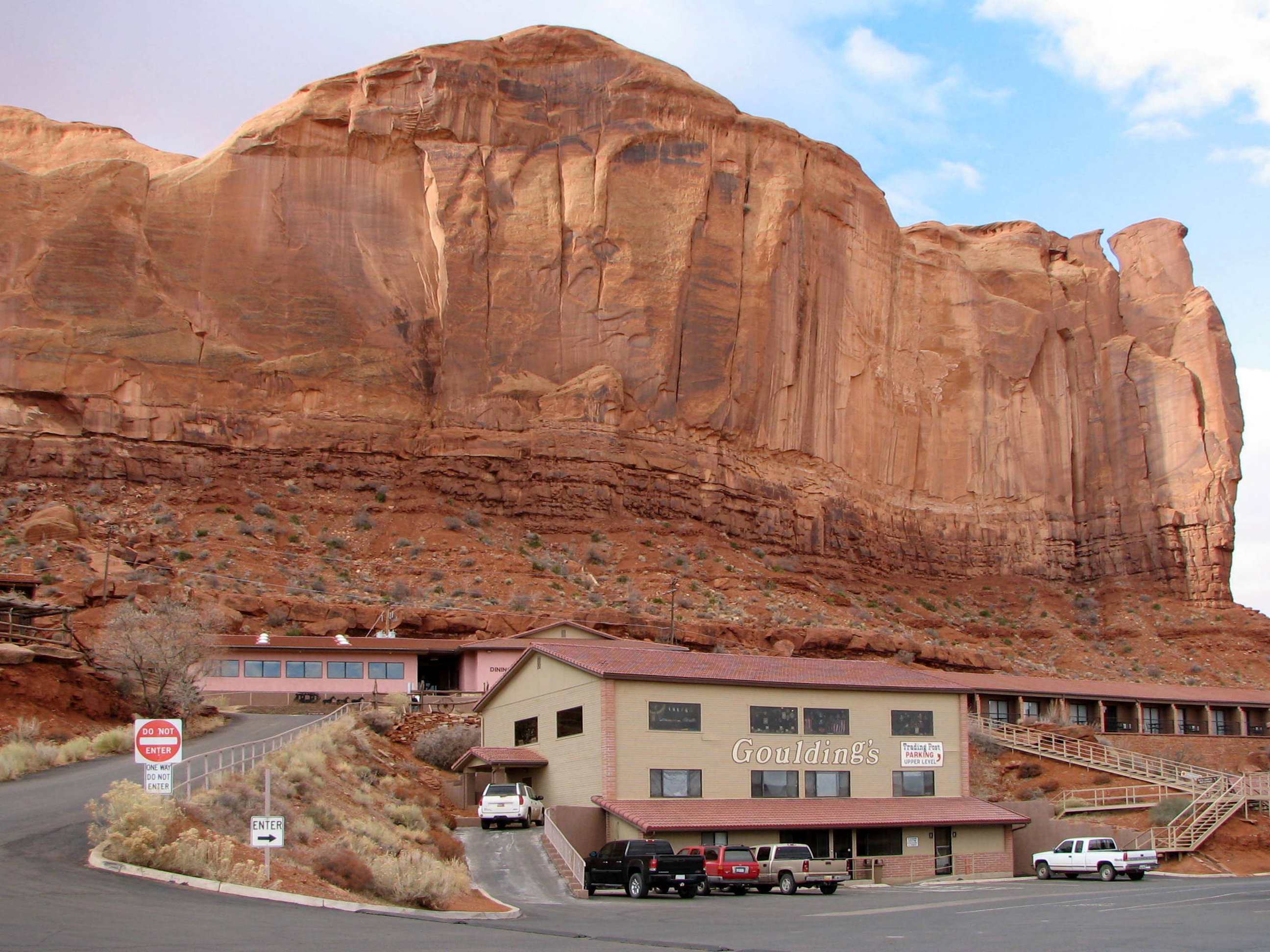
- Lodge associated with trading post

- Location within Utah Location within the United States
- Location: U.S. Route 163, Oljato-Monument Valley, Utah
- Coordinates: 37°0′24″N 110°12′9″W
- Area: less than 1 acre (0.40 ha)
- Built: 1923
- NRHP reference No.: 80003941
- Added to NRHP: October 20, 1980

Goulding's Trading Post, now called Goulding's Lodge, is a historic general store, motel, and museum in southern Utah, United States, just outside of Monument Valley. It was constructed in 1928, seven years after Harry Goulding purchased 640 acres (260 ha) of land in the area. Shortly after Monument Valley became a popular tourist attraction, it was renamed and remodeled to house Goulding's Lodge. The lodge originally served as a trading post and home for the Gouldings.

During the Great Depression, while director John Ford was looking for a site to film his 1939 movie Stagecoach, Goulding went to work capturing photos of Monument Valley to send to Ford, who ended up shooting not only Stagecoach there but several other successful Western films. The films helped to popularize the area, and Goulding, realizing the potential value of tourism, established lodging and other services that could bring additional attention and profit.

The former trading post serves as a motel/museum for tourists and travelers looking to catch a glimpse of the famous valley and has been converted into the Goulding Lodge. Its history, isolation, and proximity to Monument Valley Navajo Tribal Park have made it a popular roadside attraction for travelers. The trading post was added to the National Register of Historic Places on October 20, 1980.

In November 2023, the Navajo Nation purchased Goulding's Lodge for $59.5 million. The purchase is expected to generate $7.4 million in annual revenue for the Navajo Nation, $2.4 million of which would be due to changing the taxing authority from the state of Utah to the Navajo Nation.

== Monuments ==
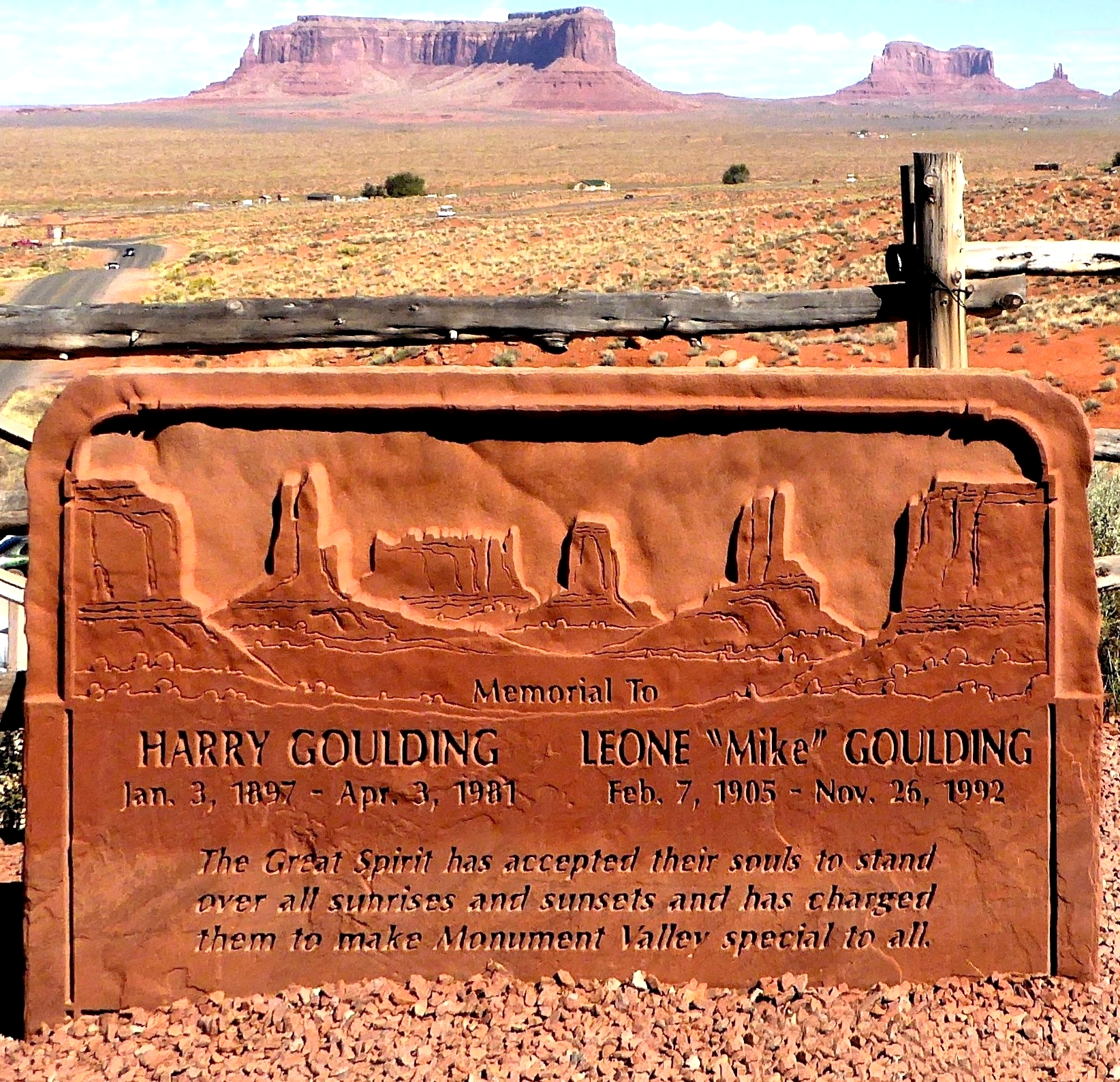
Plaque of memorial to Harry Goulding

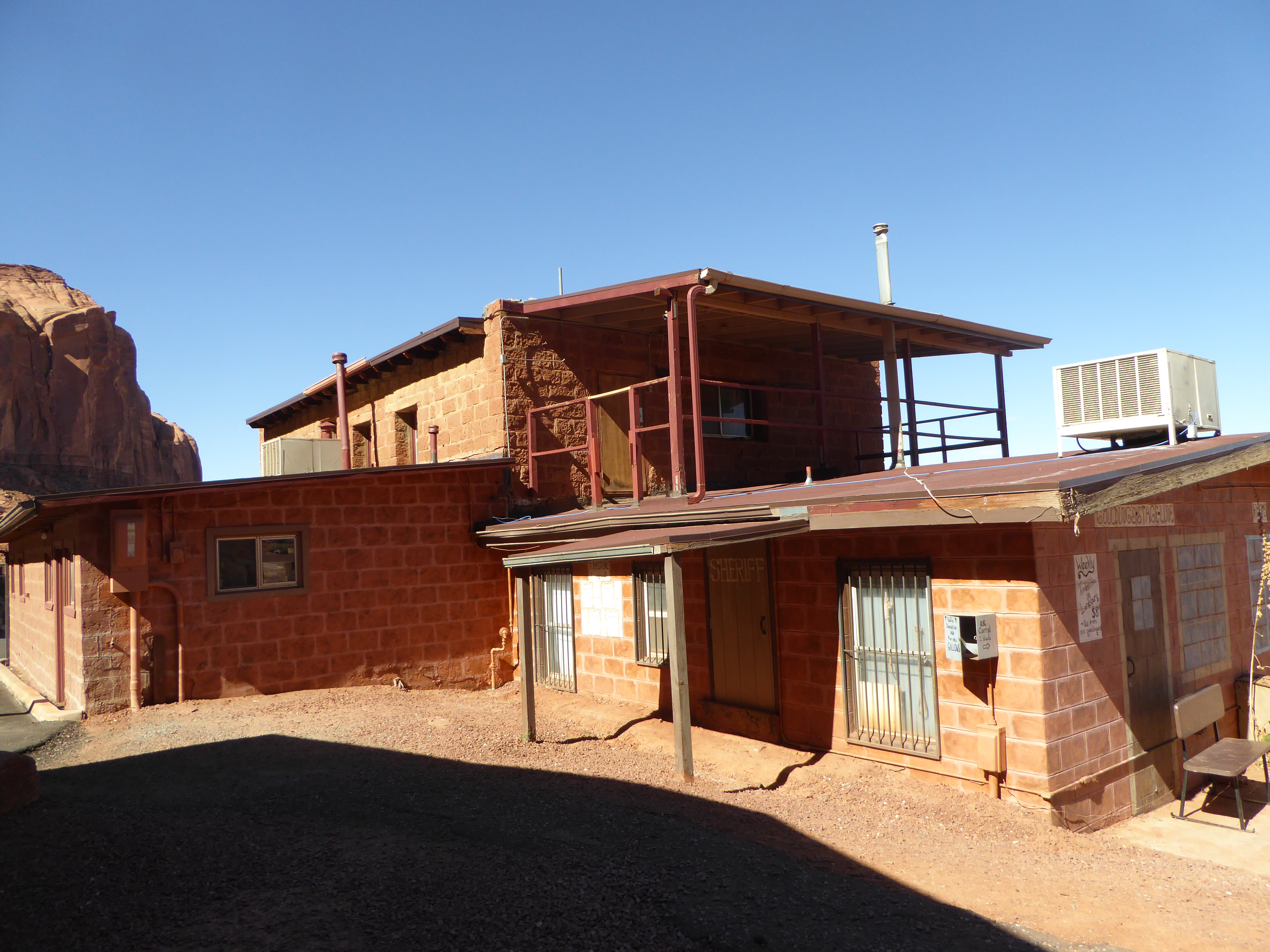
Goulding's Lodge

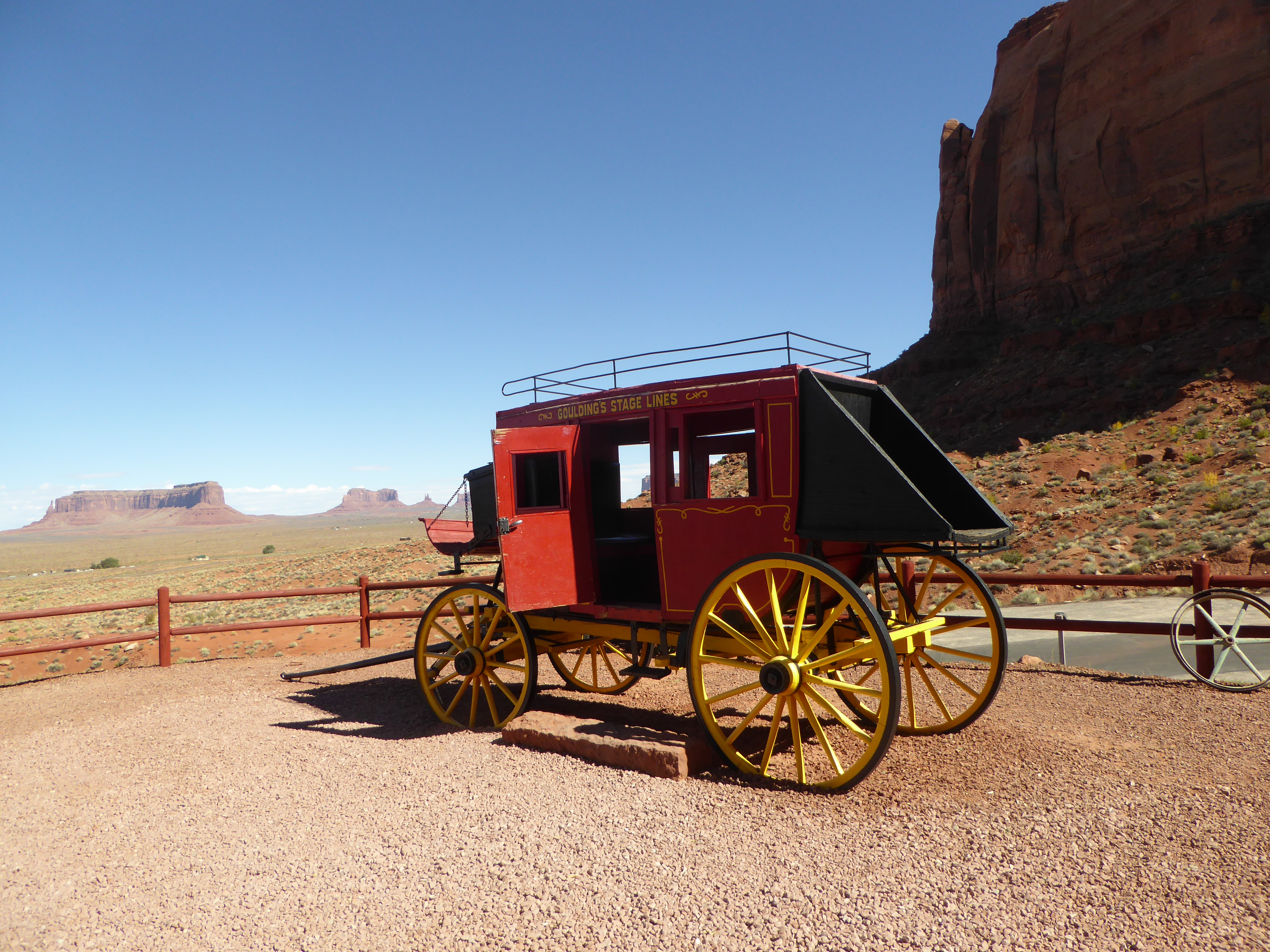
Stagecoach Gouldings at Goulding's Lodge

== See also ==
- National Register of Historic Places listings in San Juan County, Utah
