= Lemuel H. Redd Jr. House =

- U.S. National Register of Historic Places
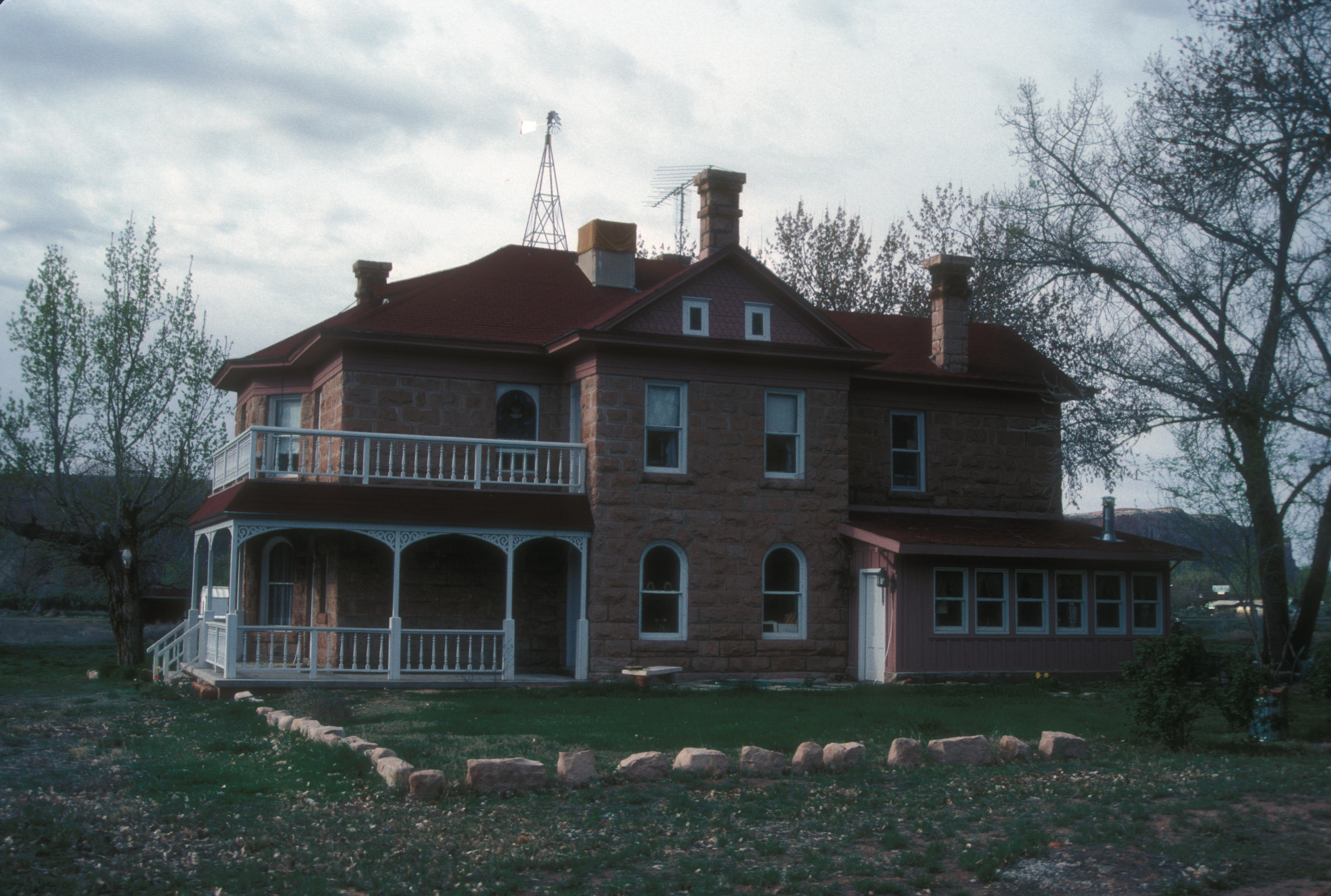
- The house in 2007

- Location within Utah Location within the United States
- Location: UT 47, Bluff, Utah
- Coordinates: 37°17′06″N 109°33′16″W
- Area: less than one acre
- Built: 1900
- Built by: Nick Loveless & Ed Thompson (stonemasons), S.T. Nibbs (carpenter)
- Architectural style: Late Victorian
- NRHP reference No.: 83003181
- Added to NRHP: May 18, 1983

The Lemuel H. Redd Jr. House is a historic house in Bluff, Utah. It was built in 1900 for Lemuel H. Redd Jr., a Mormon settler, landowner and politician who served as a member of the Utah State Legislature from 1898 to 1902.

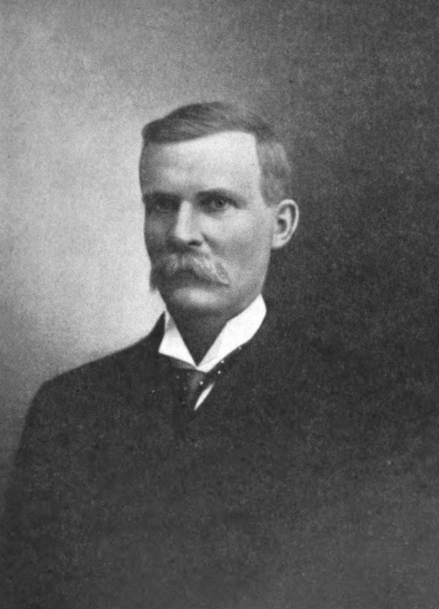
Lemuel H. Redd Jr.

Redd also served as the local bishop from 1901 to 1910, and as the president of the San Juan stake from 1910 to 1923. He had two wives: Elilza Ann Westover, with whom he had eight children, and Lucy Zina Lyman, with whom he had four children. He lived in this house, designed in the Late Victorian style, with his first family while his second family lived first in a house across the street, and later in Blanding, Utah. The house has been listed on the National Register of Historic Places since May 18, 1983.
