= Design Build Bluff =

Architecture program at the University of Utah

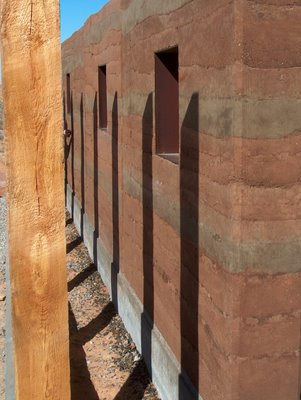
Rammed earth trombe wall built as part of a project

Design Build Bluff is a program of The University of Utah's College of Architecture + Planning, where each year, architecture graduate students are immersed in a hands-on opportunity to design and build a full-scale work of architecture in collaboration with the Navajo people. The program derives its name from the town of Bluff, Utah, adjacent to the Navajo Nation, in which the campus facility is located. Design Build Bluff projects are a full donation to the client and are noted for being innovative, sustainable and award-winning designs. The program is currently collaborating with the Mexican Water Chapter House on more community based projects.

The students gain the practical skills needed to test their theories through applied research, with the hope that students will become architects who will be able to benefit the broader community.

== History ==
DesignBuildBLUFF was founded in 2000 by University of Utah Professor, Hank Louis. The program is modeled on a design-build program at Auburn University, known as the Rural Studio, which was founded by Samuel Mockbee. In the Rural Studio model, students abandon the comforts of campus and home for a cooperative life, to learn about architecture through action. The design-build paradigm emphasizes experimentation, scale mock-ups, in-process design iterations, consensus-building through ideas and emotions, and juxtaposing diametrically opposed cultures.

Since its inception Design Build Bluff has expanded to include The University of Colorado Denver in 2010, and more recently evolved from an independent non-profit to being formally housed within the University of Utah. Hank Louis has since passed leadership, and in 2013 the program welcomed new director, José Galarza, who came from the Yestermorrow Design/Build School.

== Design and construction ==
The program emphasizes the design and construction of homes using "green-build" techniques such as passive solar, rainwater catchment, permaculture, earthen plaster, rammed earth, straw bale construction, cellulose insulation, Icynene foam (a green, water-based, open-celled building insulation product), and materials salvaged from the landscape of the reservation itself such as a substratum of natural clay, and reed from the local riverbed.

Design plans are formatted around donated and recycled materials such as lumber, windows, doors and appliances. Additionally, some of the homes are built from a unique material, FlexCrete, a new concrete block product made with fibrous aggregate from the surrounding soil, produced locally on the Navajo Nation, thereby further reducing the need to import building materials. The projects are completed on a modest cash budget, largely due to grant funding, and made possible by the generosity of the local design and construction community. Annual donors such as Big D Construction and 3Form have been involved in the projects for many years. Building sustainable, off-grid homes that have little impact on the environment accomplishes for the Navajo Nation the mission of respecting the landscape while providing adequate housing. As the program includes more community based projects it hopes to reinforce the relationship with the Navajo people, align with community goals, and maintain relevance.

== Projects ==
- 2000 - Bandstand Project
- 2001 - Bend In the River Project
- 2002 & 2003 - Kunga House
- 2004 - Rosie Joe House
- 2005 - Johnson House
- 2006 - Sweet Caroline House
- 2007 - Benally House
- 2008 - ShipShop & BathHouse; Bluff campus renovation
- 2009 - Whitehorse House
- 2010 - Studio 23 & Windcatcher House
- 2012 - Little Water House
- 2013 - Hozho House
- 2014 - solRose
- 2014 - Mexican Water Cabins
- 2015 - Badger Springs
- 2016 - Cedar Hall
- 2017 - Lone Tree
- 2018 - Fire Mesa
