= Bluff Fort =

American's pioneers history

- Settlement
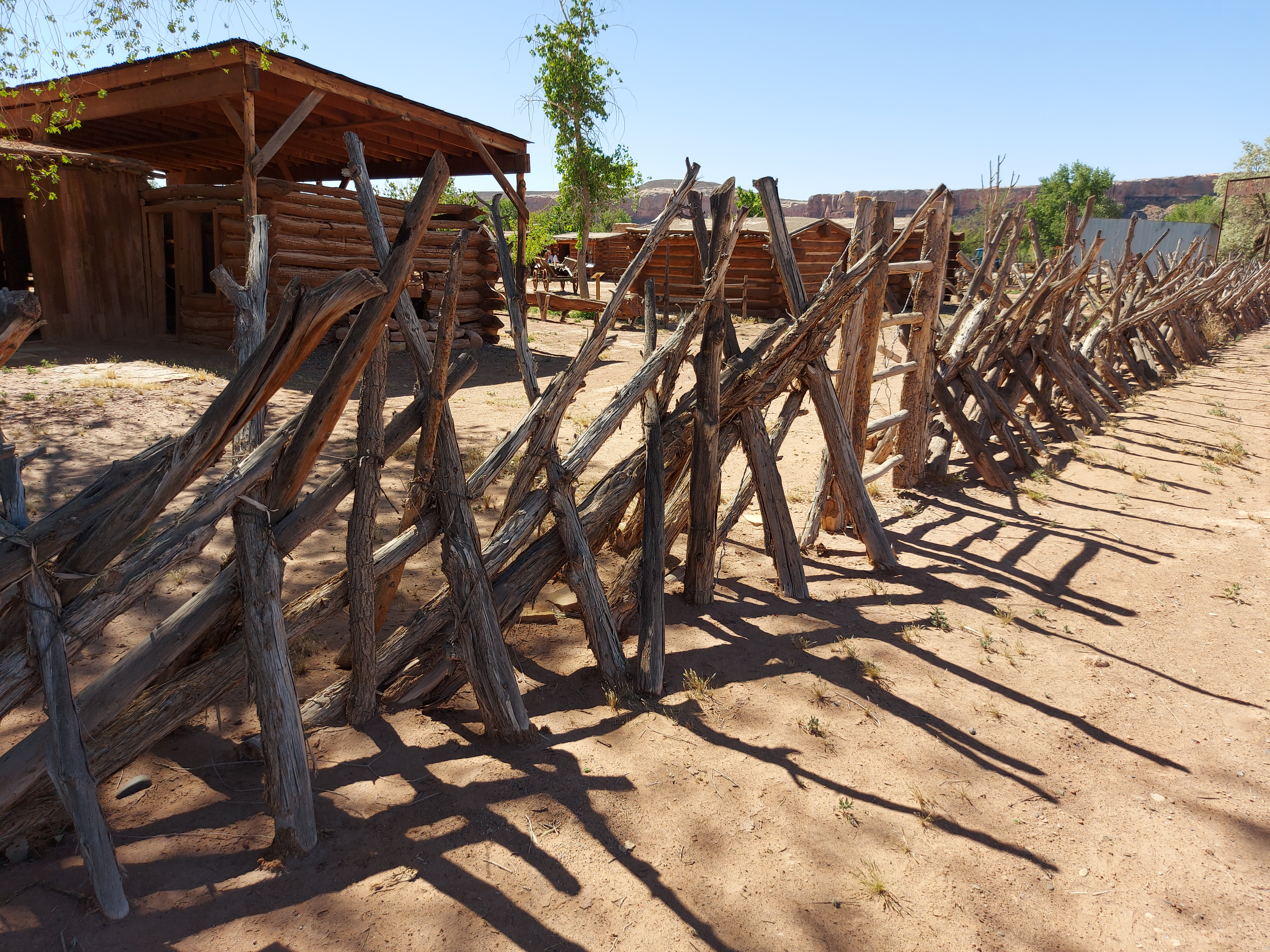
- Bluff Fort
- Interactive map of Bluff Fort
- Coordinates: 37°17′02″N 109°33′10″W
- Country: United States
- State: Utah
- County: San Juan County

Bluff Fort is a small, fenced settlement from the 19th century in southeast Utah in the United States, an area that was uninhabited until that time. The settlement in situ took place at the end of the 6-month San Juan Expedition. The route that these American pioneers took on their way to establish the settlement is called the Hole in the Rock Trail. The journey and the route are an integral part of the act of settling in Bluff Fort. The "Hole in the Rock" itself was declared in 1975 as an official historic site on behalf of the United States Department of the Interior and the National Park Service subordinate to it.

== The journey and the route ==
During the winter of 1879–1880, seventy Mormons families responded to the call of the head of their church, Brigham Young, to establish a settlement east of the Colorado River, in the area of the Four Corners Point – the only point in the United States (then and now) where the borders of four states meet: Utah, Arizona, Colorado and New Mexico. First, a pioneer expedition went out, without wagons, to locate the suitable area for settlement, and they located a reasonable agricultural land in the town of Bluff, Utah today. The entire community left in November 1879 from the town of Cedar City, Utah, and arrived to their destination in April 1880 after a six-month journey in which they traveled about 250 miles in an very difficult areas that were considered Insurmountable for carriages until that journey.

There were 250 people in the group: men, women and children; 83 carriages; and more than a thousand heads of animals.

From their departure site in Cedar City to the last inhabited town in Utah towards the east – Escalante – a distance of about 7 miles, they moved on regular paved roads (in the terms of that time). From there and on they had to cross an area of steep impassable cliffs. Then they had to break routes for themselves with the help of explosions, quarrying and preparing roads for the carriages. The highlight of the Journey was the breakthrough of the "Hole in the rock". It was originally a geological fault in a Canyon area, at a relative vertical height of about 900 feet above the Colorado River and at a distance of about 0.75-mile from there, with a slope of 45 degrees. The pioneers drilled and blasted rocks to expand the natural fault, and moderated the slope to a degree of 25°.

After two weeks of work, they tried to move their horses down the slope into the river. Additional attempts were rejected after 9 animals were lost in the first attempt. They carved steps into the solid rock to make it easier for their horses and cattle to maneuver. The rock steps were the last part of the slope that led to the river's edge. To move their wagons, they resorted to build a dugway using blasting and drilling. In total, the work on preparing the slope for the descent of the entire way to the river lasted 6 weeks. On January 26, 1880, the members of the expedition with the wagons and the animals began to descend the steep slope. The carts descended with locked brakes and about 10–20 people holding ropes to slow down the descent. They crossed the Colorado River in a ferry operated by a pioneer named Charles Hall, on which 2 carriages passed each round. As mentioned, in April 1880 they arrived at the site they began to settle – Bluff Fort!

== Bluff Fort ==
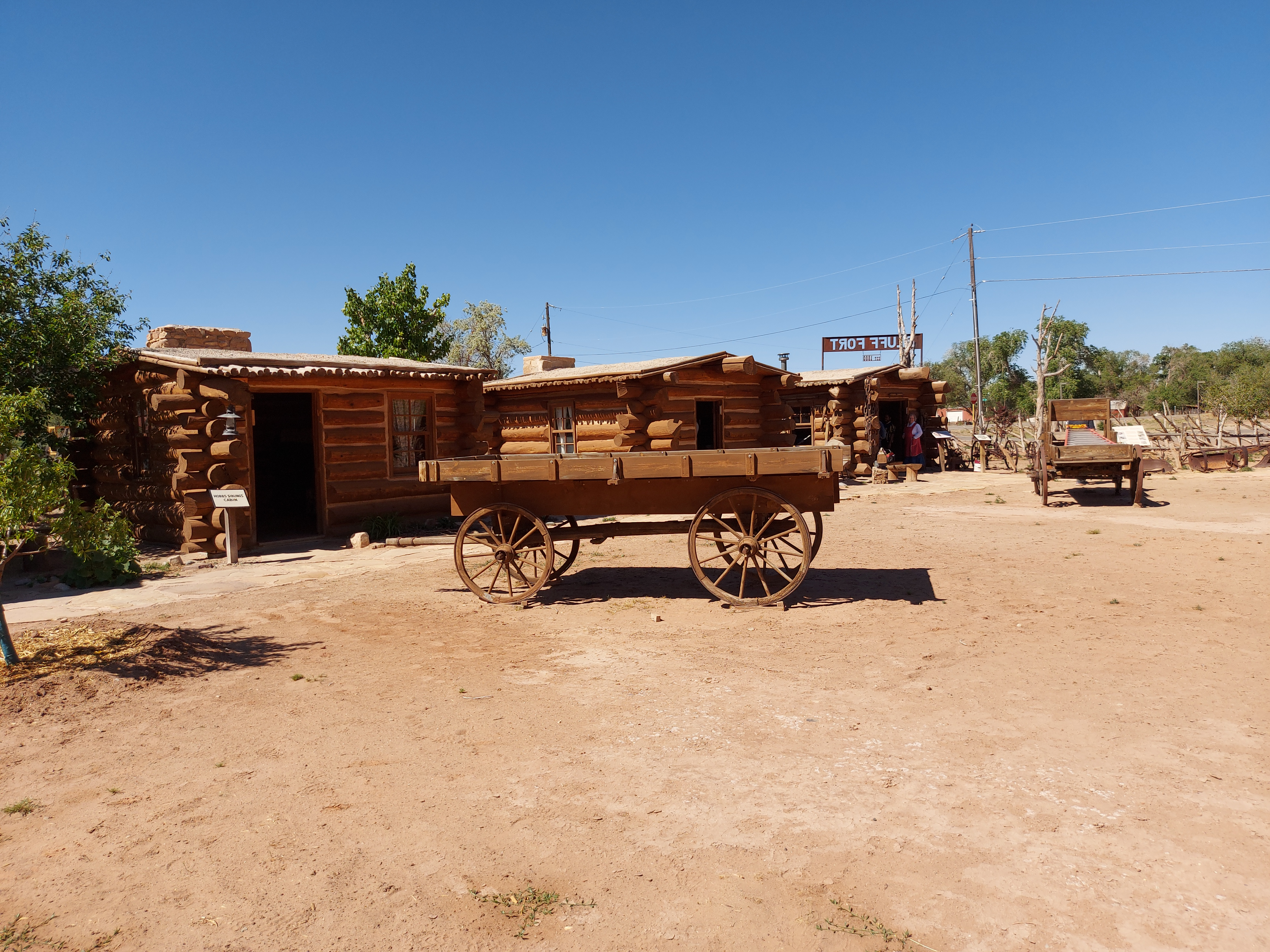
Carriages at Bluff Fort (see in the background on the roof of the right cabin the original Bluf Fort sign in reverse).

The mission assigned to the pioneers on behalf of their leader, Brigham Young, was to make peace with the natives of the Navajo Nation in the area, in purpose to convert them to Christianity and thereby to expand the (what they called) "Mormon Kingdom of Zion". There are very few sources about the daily life of the settlers, but one can get an impression from a letter written about them and published in "Harper's Weekly" on December 9, 1893, and as follows:

"Is it possible in any fertile spot in Utah, no matter how remote from civilization, not to find a prosperous band of Mormons? It might have been so before '79 (1879), but now we find many interesting settlements. One, a carefully laid out village, built on the bottom-lands of the San Juan River and the cliffs, is fitly called Bluff City. I cannot imagine a finer example of Mormon enterprise than these two hundred people, with their wealth of cattle and horses, leaving good homes, and facing the dangers and hardships of an unknown country."

In a corner of the fort, the Bluff pioneers established a cooperative trading post. The cooperative sold goods and supplies to the people of the settlement and traded with the Navajo. Soon the store began to declare dividends. The pioneers bought wool from the Navajos, leathers and blankets and transported these goods to Durango, Colorado for sale. On the return trip from Durango, they brought in other cargoes which were sold at Bluff Port, thus making a nice profit. The profits from the co-op provided the means for the pioneers to stayin site and helped to start the thriving cattle business years later.

When the settlement was founded, there were 258 people in Bluff Fort: 43 men over 19; 29 women over the same age; 120 children under 19 including babies. They lived in 66 huts, owned 83 carriages, about 200 head of cattle and about 1,800 other animals.
