= St. Christopher's Episcopal Mission =

Historic church in Utah, United States

- U.S. National Register of Historic Places
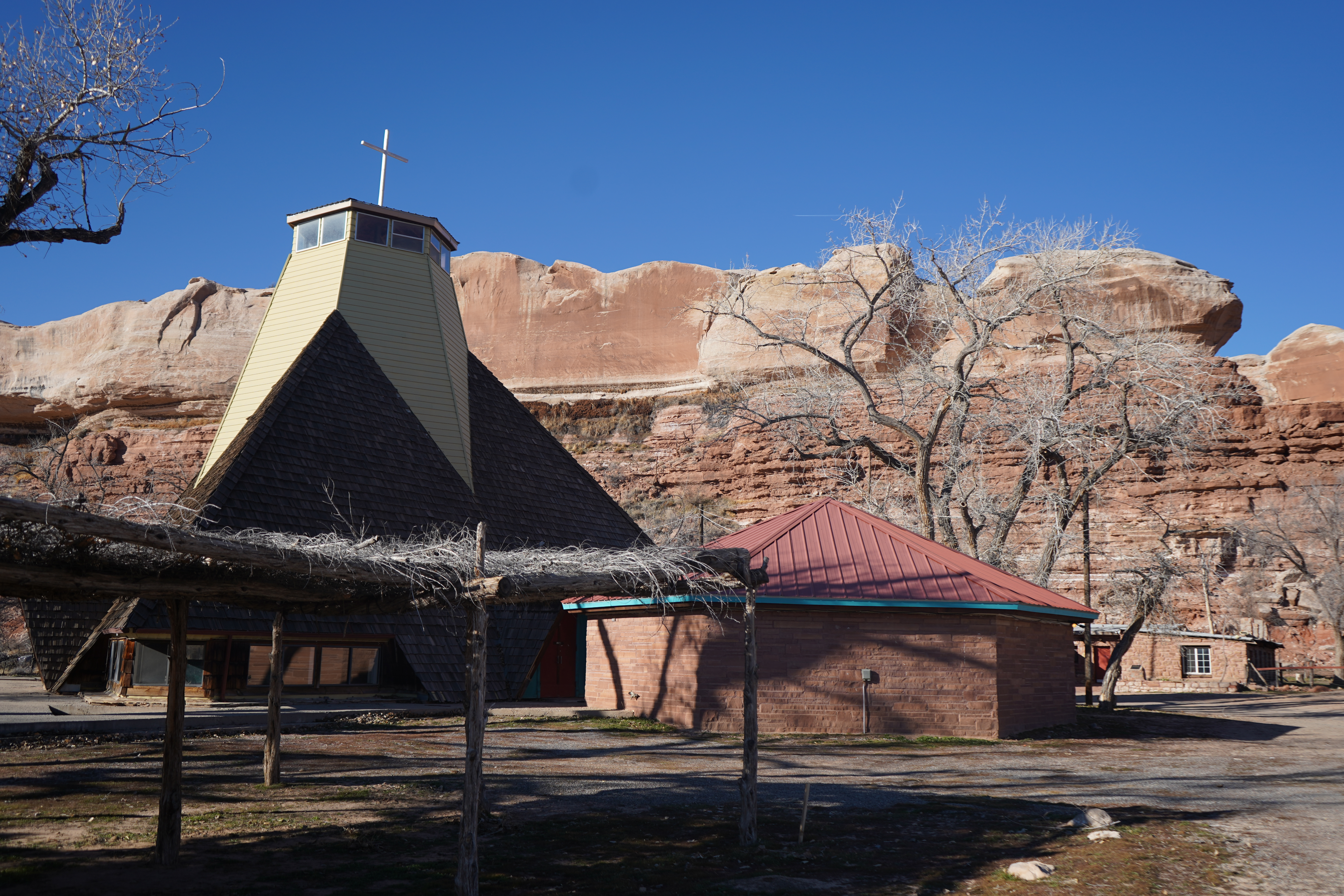

- Location within Utah Location within the United States
- Nearest city: Bluff, Utah
- Coordinates: 37°17′6″N 109°30′49″W
- Area: 8 acres (3.2 ha)
- Built: c.1943-c.1951 (mission house)
- Built by: multiple
- Architect: Liebler, Fr. H. Baxter
- Architectural style: Mission revival/Spanish Revival
- NRHP reference No.: 02001042
- Added to NRHP: November 18, 2002

St. Christopher's Episcopal Mission (also known as St. Christopher's Mission to the Navajo) is a historic Episcopal church 1.7 miles east of Bluff, Utah. It was added to the National Register of Historic Places in 2002.

The property includes three contributing buildings and eight noncontributing buildings plus small structures. It is located across the San Juan River from the Navajo reservation which it served. A narrow suspension footbridge across the river allowed Navajo children to come to attend school at the mission, is not included in the property. A cemetery is also outside the property.

The primary historic building is the mission house, built from about 1943 to about 1951.
