= Charles Redd =

American businessman from Utah (1889–1975)

Charles Redd MBE
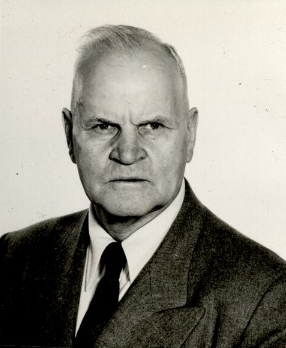
- Born: May 8, 1889; Bluff, Utah, U.S.
- Died: March 30, 1975 (aged 85); Provo, Utah, U.S.
- Occupations: Rancher; member of the Utah State House of Representatives

Charles Redd (May 8, 1889 – March 30, 1975) was an American landowner, rancher, and businessman in Utah. Redd was born and raised in southeastern Utah, and attended Brigham Young University (BYU) before serving a mission for the Church of Jesus Christ of Latter-day Saints in the Pacific Northwest. He was later the owner of the La Sal Livestock Company and of its successor, Redd Ranches. Redd also served three terms as a member of the Utah State Legislature, and his main objectives included the raising of the per capita school fund tax to benefit rural schools, the allocation of funds for road construction in San Juan County, the relocation of the Utah State Prison, and the legalization of horse racing in the state of Utah. Redd was affiliated with various social and political organizations throughout his life, including the Boy Scouts, the Utah Power and Light Company, the Amalgamated Sugar Company, the Bureau of Land Management, and the Federal Land Bank. Redd was also a recipient of the Most Excellent Order of the British Empire, bestowed upon him by Queen Elizabeth II in 1957. In 1972, a donation made by Redd and his family established the Charles Redd Center for Western Studies and the Lemuel H. Redd Chair in Western History at BYU, his alma mater. Redd died in Provo, Utah, in 1975 following various health complications.

== Early life and education ==
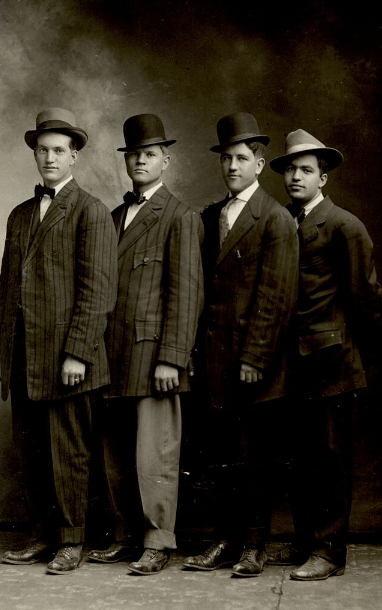
Redd (second from left), photographed here with fellow missionaries

Charles Redd was born in Bluff, Utah, on May 8, 1889, to Lemuel Hardison Redd, Jr. and Eliza Ann Westover as the sixth of their eight children. Lemuel and Eliza were members of the Church of Jesus Christ of Latter-day Saints (LDS Church) and practiced polygamy; Lemuel had a second wife named Lucy. The family were part of the initial settlement in Bluff, Utah, a town with a population of around 120 people. Redd would often ride around town on his horse, and attended school in a two-room log cabin near his home.

Redd's family was primarily engaged in crop farming during the early years of his life. In 1892, Lemuel became superintendent of a co-op with friends who bought a cattle company in Bluff called Elk Cattle Company. In 1897, Lemuel became one of two private owners of the sheep portion of this co-op. Redd and his siblings would often assist their father on the ranch and help with tasks such as shearing, lambing, and marking. At age eleven Redd contracted pleurisy, and spent nearly two months in Salt Lake City undergoing medical treatment. Redd was later excused from military service during World War I due to his history of illness.

Following his completion of the eighth grade in Bluff, Redd attended Brigham Young High School in Provo, Utah. During his time in school Redd studied business and agriculture, and was active on the baseball team and in the theater program. In addition to attending high school at Brigham Young Academy, Redd studied there for his undergraduate degree. Records suggest that Redd graduated in 1911, but he did not receive his degree until 1914. After his graduation, Redd served a mission for the LDS Church in the Pacific Northwest from November 1911 to March 1914. During this time he lived in various cities in northwest Washington and for a few weeks in Portland, Oregon.

== Work in eastern Utah ==
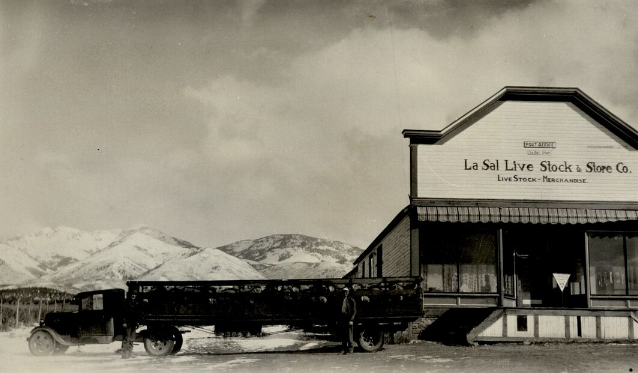
An early photograph of The La Sal Livestock and Store Company, owned and operated by Redd

Redd returned to the La Sal area north of Bluff following his time in the Pacific Northwest. In 1914, he supervised the construction of a reservoir in Dark Canyon for his father's livestock company. In December 1914, he was named manager of the newly organized La Sal Livestock Company, of which his father was the largest shareholder. Redd later became the full owner of La Sal Livestock Company and of the succeeding company Redd Ranches. In 1918, Redd built and began operating the La Sal Livestock and Store Company, which sold dry goods, hardware, farm machinery, haying equipment, and more. For several years, Redd raised turkeys. Redd served as the postmaster of La Sal for fifty years, with the post office located inside his store. He also ran a farm machinery and car dealership in La Sal—the Charles Redd Motor Company—which was moved to Monticello in 1951.

He used cattle breeding science to select for cattle hardy in high-altitudes, selling seed stock around 1920. In the 1940s, Redd introduced crested wheatgrass from Canada to his ranch to provide spring grazing fodder for his cattle. He selectively bred the Rambouillet sheep breed with his Columdia herd for more wool and larger lambs. In 1957, The Salt Lake Tribune wrote that he was "regarded as the largest individual stockman in Utah", owning thousands of acres of land. In 1974, Redd was honored as one of 29 stockmen of the century, as voted on by readers of the Record Stockman newspaper.

== Utah State Legislature ==
From 1924 to 1930, Redd served three terms in the Utah House of Representatives as a representative from San Juan County and was a delegate to three National Republican Conventions. He sat in the legislature during the 1925, 1927, and 1929 sessions, and during the 1930 Special Session. Upon his election to the House, his main objectives were raising the per capita school fund tax to increase funding for rural schools, allocating funds for road construction in San Juan County, and the relocating the Utah State Prison from the Sugar House neighborhood in Salt Lake to the south end of Draper, Utah. The prison relocation, Redd argued, would give the prison room to expand as needed and its location would enable inmates to perform farm work.

One of Redd's more well-known bills was his horse racing proposal, which he introduced into the house in 1925. Horse-racing in Utah was unregulated until 1913, when it and similar forms of gambling were made felonies. Redd's bill proposed the revival of horse racing in Utah, the creation of a state racing commission, the implementation of a parimutuel betting system, and outlined conditions and regulations for meets. The bill was introduced on February 19, 1925, and the law took effect on May 12 of the same year. Those who voted for the bill hoped that horse racing would help local businesses, including horse breeders. Discussing the horse-racing industry in Utah, Bruce Westergren wrote in Utah Historical Quarterly in 1989 that the successful out-of-state racing syndicates improved the local economies of Salt Lake City and Davis County. In 1926, Redd announced during his reelection campaign that he would move to repeal the law during the 1927 legislative session, given the negative public opinion and controversy surrounding the sport and the practice of betting. In January 1927, Redd introduced HB 4, which proposed to abolish horse racing and betting. The bill was signed into law on February 24, 1927, and with it horse racing was once again made illegal in Utah. Part of Redd's decision to make horseracing illegal again was based on information he heard from George Relf about corruption in the horse racing industry in Utah. A later hearing found that Relf's information was similarly secondhand. Two key witnesses were too ill to testify, and one died shortly after a preliminary report.

Redd was a member of various committees during his time in the state legislature. He chaired committees for livestock, public buildings, grounds, and public printing. He served at various times as a member of the committees for education, enrolling and engrossing, appropriations, joint appropriations, banking, and public health. Despite leaving the legislature after only three terms, Redd remained active in politics and social affairs throughout the rest of his life.

== Other affiliations ==
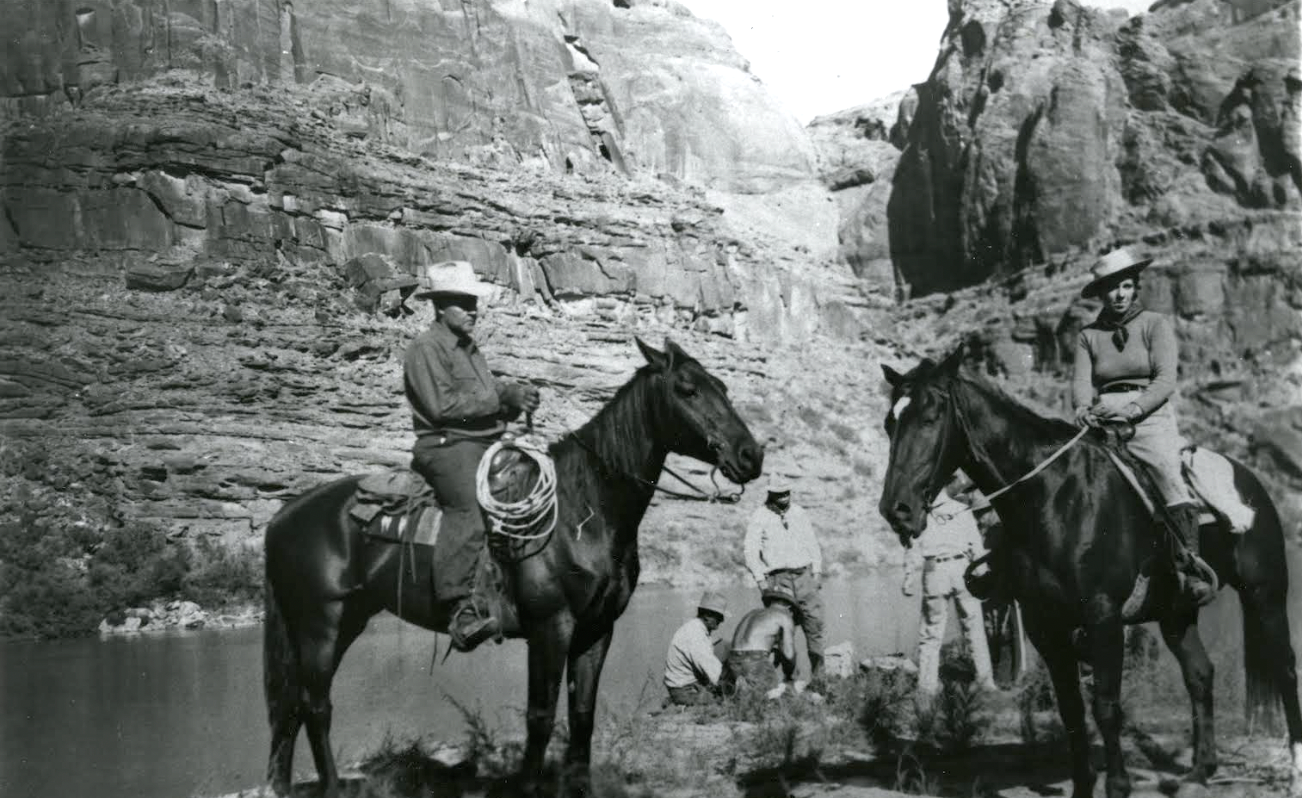
Charles (left) and wife Annaley (right) on horseback in front of the Hole-in-the-Rock cleft at the Colorado River

In addition to his activities as a rancher and politician, Redd was involved with the Regional Executive Committee of the Boy Scouts, the Pacific National Life Assurance Company, the U.S. Cowboy Hall of Fame, and the Hoover Dam Commission. He was on the board of regents of Utah State Agricultural College for eight years. Following World War I and before the onset of the Great Depression, Redd elected to invest in the stock of various electric companies, including the Utah Power and Light Company, to establish a reserve to protect against dire financial circumstances. Redd eventually became one of the company's ten largest stockholders and was on its board of directors. He was also the director of the Amalgamated Sugar Company for eighteen years and director and chairman of the Utah Water and Power Board for ten years.

Redd was elected president of the National Wool Marketing Association in 1934, and traveled periodically throughout the country promoting the cooperative marketing of wool. In 1947, Redd was appointed to the Utah Water and Power Board where he sat for eighteen years—six of those as its chairman. Redd was also president of the State Bank of San Juan and was on the board of directors of the Federal Land Bank.

Redd served on the Board of Regents of Utah State University's Agricultural College for eight years. In 1956, Redd was named the Honorary Stockman of the Year of the Brigham Young University Stockmen's Club. In 1972 he donated $500,000 to establish the Charles Redd Institute for Western Studies and the Lemuel H. Redd Chair in Western History at BYU.

In a letter addressed to his sons, Redd wrote the following with regards to his involvement in various organizations and activities:

Ranching, no matter how successful it is money-wise, will not be a desirable vocation unless you have time to read, travel, and make use of cultural opportunities. I would like to see you get squared around so you could spend at least a month out of each year with your families perhaps attending short courses or visiting some foreign land or doing things that will be pleasant and at the same time help you culturally and spiritually. And I am convinced that this is entirely practical if you will plan and scheme and get your houses in order... I want you boys to grow spiritually, culturally, and mentally.

=== Relationship with foreign dignitaries ===
On various occasions, Redd and his family entertained Lord Halifax, the British ambassador to the United States, and other British consuls from major U.S. cities. The ensuing friendship which developed between Redd and Lord Halifax resulted in the bestowal of the Most Excellent Order of the British Empire on Redd by Queen Elizabeth II during her 1957 visit to Washington, D.C. The award was presented to Redd "in recognition of his outstanding services in the cause of Anglo-American friendship and understanding."

== Personal life and family ==
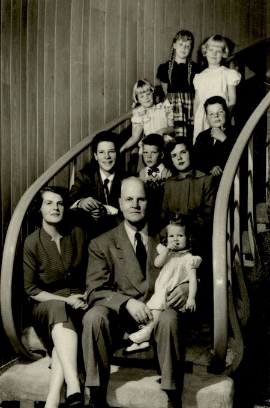
Portrait of the Redd family

Redd was briefly married to Ethel Moore, who he had met while on business in Moab, Utah, from 1921 until their divorce in 1925. The reason for divorce was cited as "extreme cruelty" in a California newspaper, where Moore was living at the time of divorce. In 1931, Redd married Annaley Naegle, who had been born into a polygamist family in Morelos, Mexico. Naegle's family had moved to Utah following the Mexican Revolution in 1912, and due to anti-polygamy laws the family had not been permitted to live together. Naegle lived with her mother and siblings in Castle Dale, Utah, and Ammon, Idaho before attending Brigham Young University. Following her graduation, Naegle accepted a teaching position in La Sal, and at the same time worked at the La Sal Livestock and Store Company as Redd's secretary. Naegle and Redd were married on August 29, 1931, in Farmington, Utah, and were later sealed in the Salt Lake Temple in 1951. The couple had nine children, eight of whom lived to adulthood.

Because of the distance between their home in La Sal and the nearest school, the Redd family built a home in Provo, Utah, where they lived during the school year so that their children could attend school without having to travel daily or be separated from their parents. The family would return to their home in La Sal in the summers, and during this time Redd would send his sons to work with local ranchers and cowboys.

== Death and legacy ==
In 1969, Redd suffered a cardiovascular episode referred to by many as a "stroke", and lost his ability to speak, walk unassisted, and drive. Redd died on March 30, 1975, and was buried in the San Juan Cemetery in Blanding, Utah.

As of 2018, the Redd cattle business continued, covering "thousands of acres throughout San Juan county".

== Sources ==
- Arrington, Leonard J. (1995). Utah's Audacious Stockman, Charlie Redd. Logan: Utah State University Press. ISBN 0-87421-177-8. OCLC 31515461.
- Westergren, Bruce N. (1989). "Utah's Gamble with Pari-mutuel Betting in the Early Twentieth Century". Utah Historical Quarterly. 57 (1): 4–23. doi:10.2307/45061733. JSTOR 45061733. S2CID 254440842.
- Young, Karl E. (1975). Alexander, Thomas G. (ed.). Charles Redd: Profile of a Renaissance Man as Rancher. Provo: Brigham Young University Press. ISBN 0842503226.
