= James Bean Decker House =

- U.S. National Register of Historic Places
- U.S. Historic district – Contributing property
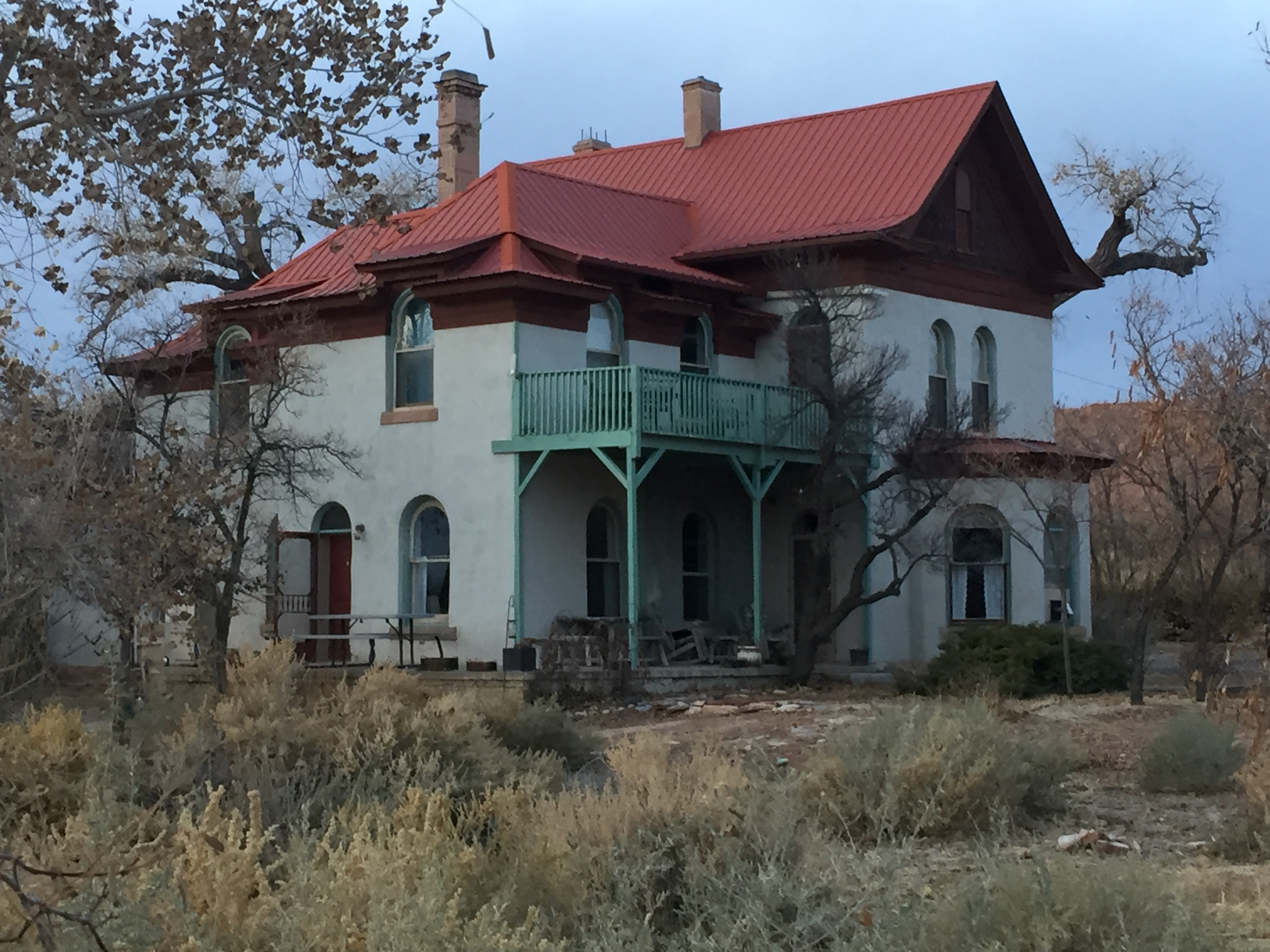

- Location within Utah Location within the United States
- Location: UT 47, Bluff, Utah
- Coordinates: 37.285291°N 109.557573°W
- Area: less than one acre
- Built: 1898
- Part of: Bluff Historic District (ID95001273)
- NRHP reference No.: 83003180

Significant dates
- Added to NRHP: August 4, 1983
- Designated CP: November 2, 1995

The James Bean Decker House, at 189 N. 300 East (Utah State Route 47), in Bluff, Utah, was built in 1898. It was listed on the National Register of Historic Places in 1983. It is also a contributing building in the National Register-listed Bluff Historic District.

It is a large, two-story brick house whose exterior was originally brick, but was stuccoed in the 1950s.

It was built in 1895 for James Bean Decker (1853-1900) and his wife Anna Marie Mickelson Decker (b.1855). Both born in Utah, the Mormon couple was married in 1874. Decker was "called to settle the San Juan Region" and was part of the exploring expedition which came to the San Juan River in the summer of 1879, via northern Arizona. He was one of the original settlers who came across the Hole-in-the-Rock Trail from Escalante to Bluff in 1879–1880. He operated large cattle and sheep ranches, and became the county's first sheriff. He was also the first superintendent of the Bluff Sunday School. He died in the 1900 diphtheria epidemic in Bluff.

Decker appears in the historical novel The Undaunted, by Gerald Lund, which is based on history, including diaries, of the Hole-in-the-Rock expedition.
