= Frederick Isaac and Mary M. Jones House =

- Frederick Issac and Mary M. Jones House
- U.S. National Register of Historic Places
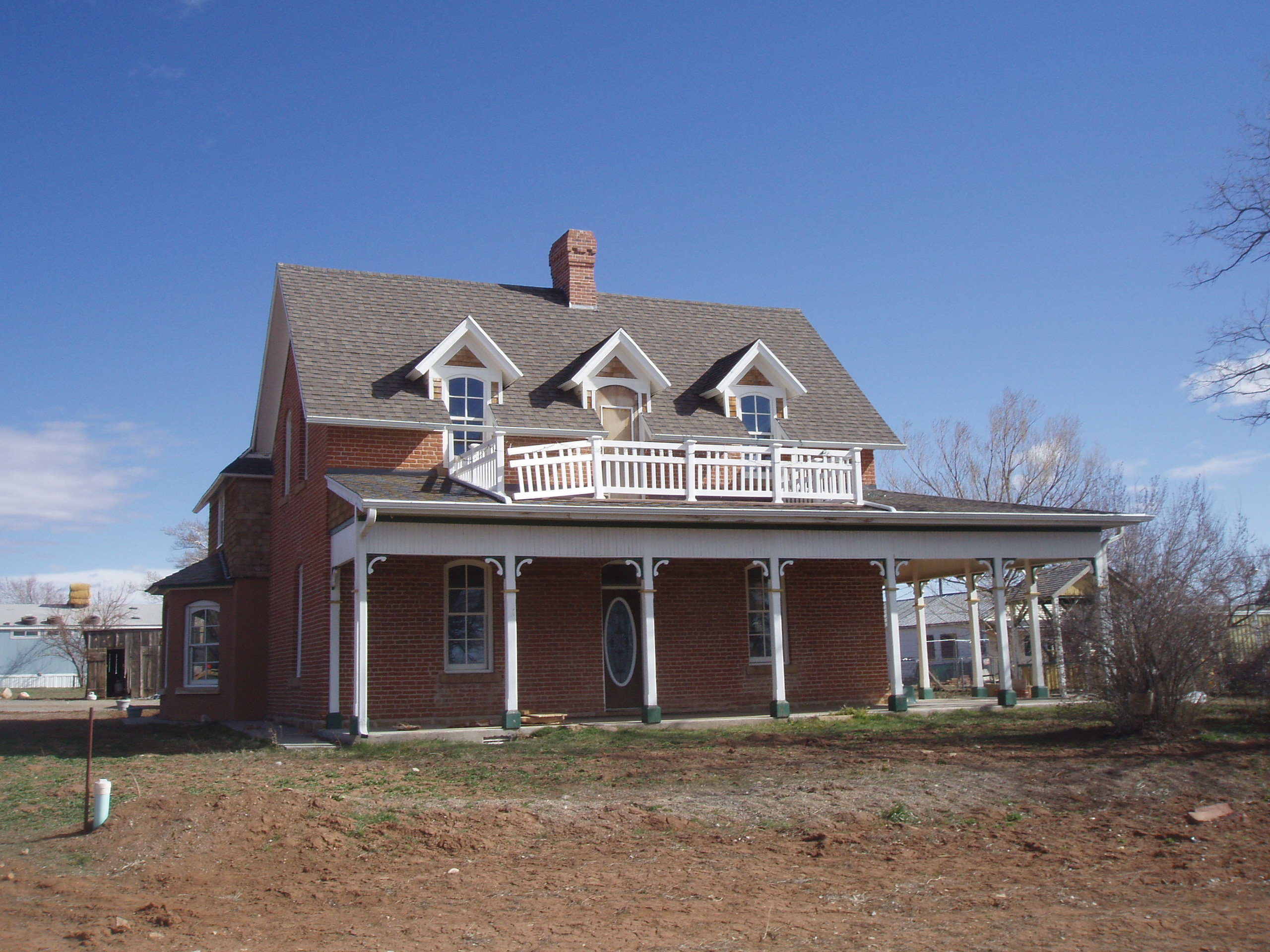
- The house in 2009

- Location within Utah Location within the United States
- Location: 117 East 200 South, Monticello, Utah
- Coordinates: 37°52′12″N 109°20′24″W
- Area: less than one acre
- Built: 1896
- Architectural style: Gothic Revival, Victorian Eclectic
- NRHP reference No.: 03000154
- Added to NRHP: August 14, 2003

The Frederick Isaac and Mary M. Jones House is a historic house in Monticello, Utah. It was built in 1896 for Frederick Isaac Jones, a member of the Church of Jesus Christ of Latter-day Saints from Cedar City, Utah who moved to Montecillo with his wife Mary as a settler. Jones served as the local bishop for 25 years. His house was designed in the Gothic Revival and Victorian Eclectic styles. It has been listed on the National Register of Historic Places since August 14, 2003.
