= John Albert Scorup House =

- U.S. National Register of Historic Places
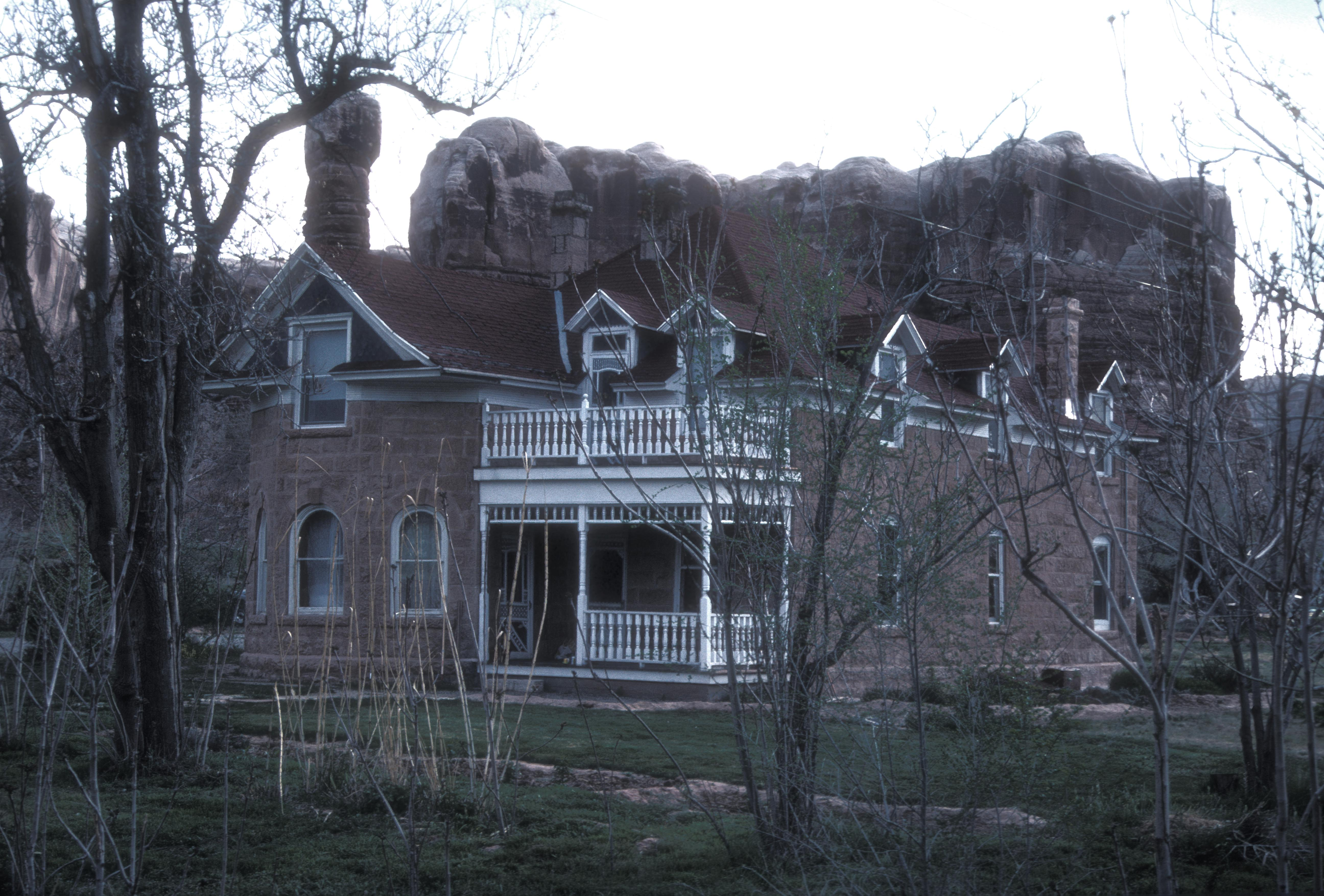
- The house in 2007

- Location within Utah Location within the United States
- Location: UT 47, Bluff, Utah
- Coordinates: 37°17′09″N 109°32′57″W
- Area: less than one acre
- Built: 1904
- Built by: Nick Loveless, Ed Thompson
- Architectural style: Late Victorian
- NRHP reference No.: 83003182
- Added to NRHP: April 13, 1983

The John Albert Scorup House is a historic house in Bluff, Utah. It was built in 1903-1904 for John Albert Scorup, a white settler of Ephraim, Utah whose parents were Danish-born converts to the Church of Jesus Christ of Latter-day Saints. Scorup became a cattleman and banker. He lived in Bluff with his first wife, Emma Bayless, and their six daughters until 1917, when he moved to Provo. The house was designed in the Late Victorian style and built by stone masons Nick Loveless (or Lovelace) and Ed Thompson. The house was listed on the National Register of Historic Places in 1983.

Photos from 1982 show the building apparently vacant; the 2007 photo above shows it has been improved.
