= Quail rock art panel =

Archaeological site in San Juan County, Utah, US

Quail Panel
- Location within Utah
- 37.4654°N 110.0720°W
- Cultures: Basketmaker, Fremont
- Location: San Juan County, Utah

Site notes
- Archaeologists: Richard Wetherill, Michael Harner
- Owner: public
- Management: Bureau of Land Management
- Public access: yes

The Quail rock art panel is a panel of Native American rock art located at the intersect of Grand Gulch and Step Canyon in Cedar Mesa, San Juan County, Utah. Grand Gulch contains a large number of relatively well-preserved rock art and ledge dwellings. The Quail Panel is a grouping of pictographs that were probably created by people of the Basketmaker II or Fremont culture. Cedar Mesa is located at a point where the two cultures overlapped.

The panel is probably named for a conspicuous depiction of a quail or quail-like bird with a vivid green and red-brown eye. The panel contains a row of anthropomorphs or warriors with shields and topknots or feathered headbands. The collection includes two green figures, which is a rare pigment for southwestern rock art. The panel also includes a red, scowling visage that may represent a mountain lion.

Hiking to Quail Panel is 9.6 miles via the "Government Trail" past Polly's Island. This is typically the easiest and shortest route. The Government Trail passes the Big Man Panel. Hiking to Quail Panel is 18.5 miles from the Collins Spring trailhead through Collins Canyon and 19.5 miles from the Kane Gulch Ranger Station trailhead through Kane Gulch.
