= Bluff, Utah =

- Incorporated town and municipality
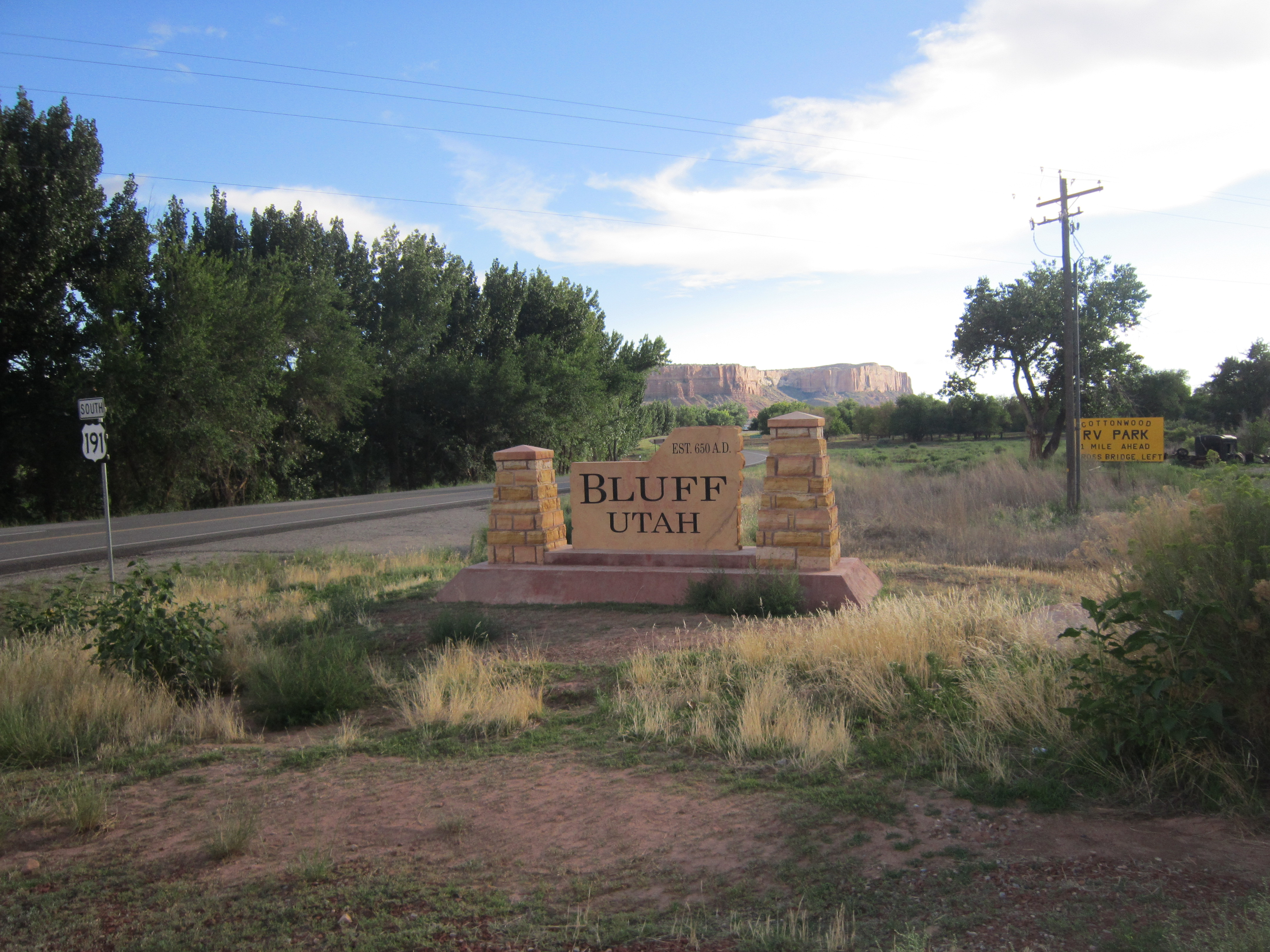

- Location in San Juan County and the state of Utah
- Coordinates: 37°17′04″N 109°33′06″W
- Country: United States
- State: Utah
- County: San Juan
- Established: AD 650
- Founded: April 6, 1880
- Incorporated: August 31, 2018
- Founder: Silas S. Smith
- Named for: Bluffs (cliffs) along the San Juan River

Government
  - Type: Mayor-council government

Area
  - Total: 36.71 sq mi (95.08 km^{2})
  - Land: 36.47 sq mi (94.45 km^{2})
  - Water: 0.24 sq mi (0.63 km^{2})
- Elevation: 4,380 ft (1,340 m)

Population (2020)
  - Total: 240
  - Density: 6.7/sq mi (2.59/km^{2})
- Time zone: UTC-7 (Mountain (MST))
  - Summer (DST): UTC-6 (MDT)
- ZIP code: 84512
- Area code: 435
- FIPS code: 49-06700
- GNIS feature ID: 2798080
- Website: townofbluffutah.gov

Bluff (Navajo: Tséłgaii Deezʼáhí) is a town in San Juan County, Utah, United States. The population was 240 at the 2020 census, down from 320 at the 2000 census, of which, at the time, it was a census-designated place. Bluff was incorporated in 2018. Josh Ewing is currently the mayor.

== History ==
Under the direction of John Taylor, Silas S. Smith and Danish settler Jens Nielson led about 230 Mormons on an expedition to start a farming community in southeastern Utah. After forging about 200 miles (320 kilometers) of their own trail over difficult terrain, the settlers arrived on the site of Bluff in April 1880. (The trail followed went over and down the "Hole in the Rock", which now opens into one of the tributaries of Lake Powell.) The town was named for the bluffs near the town site. The town's population had declined to seventy by 1930 but rebounded during a uranium prospecting boom in the 1950s. With the uranium decline in the 1970s, Bluff again declined and now remains a small town with about 200 residents.

== Geography ==
Bluff is located in the sparsely populated southeastern Utah canyonlands of the Colorado Plateau. The community is on the north margin of the San Juan River valley at the confluence of Cottonwood Wash with the San Juan. U.S. routes 163 and 191 and State Route 162 pass through the community.

According to the United States Census Bureau, the town has a total area of 22.6 square miles (58.7 km^{2}), of which 22.1 square miles (57.2 km^{2}) is land and 0.6 square mile (1.4 km^{2}) (2.43%) is water.

== Climate ==
Bluff has a cold desert climate (Köppen BWk) typical of southern Utah, though it borders on a cold semi-arid climate (BSk). Winters are cool and dry with occasional snow. Despite averaging just over 8 in (20 cm) of snow per year, only three seasons have gone without snow (1928–1929, 1963–1964, and 1995–1996). The snowiest season was 1978–1979, with 28 in (71 cm). Nights are chilly, falling below freezing on 141 days per year, while only seven days fail to rise above freezing. Bluff is located in hardiness zone 7A, with an average yearly low of 1 °F (−17 °C). Spring comes quickly in February and is the driest time of the year. Temperatures are usually warm, although snow has fallen as late as April (although very rarely). The average last freeze is April 25. Summer is long and hot with occasional thunderstorms. Days reach 90 °F (32 °C), an average of 86 days per year, and attain highs of 100 °F (38 °C) or greater on 16. Despite the hot days, nights cool to 60 °F (16 °C). While September is still hot, temperatures cool rapidly in October and November. Snow has fallen in October but usually holds off until late November. The first freeze typically comes on October 7.

Climate data for Bluff, Utah (1991–2020 normals, extremes 1911–present)
| Month | Jan | Feb | Mar | Apr | May | Jun | Jul | Aug | Sep | Oct | Nov | Dec | Year |
|---|---|---|---|---|---|---|---|---|---|---|---|---|---|
| Record high °F (°C) | 69 (21) | 76 (24) | 86 (30) | 94 (34) | 102 (39) | 106 (41) | 109 (43) | 106 (41) | 102 (39) | 95 (35) | 85 (29) | 69 (21) | 109 (43) |
| Mean maximum °F (°C) | 55.2 (12.9) | 64.3 (17.9) | 76.3 (24.6) | 85.0 (29.4) | 93.2 (34.0) | 101.1 (38.4) | 103.4 (39.7) | 99.8 (37.7) | 94.7 (34.8) | 83.7 (28.7) | 68.8 (20.4) | 56.7 (13.7) | 103.7 (39.8) |
| Mean daily maximum °F (°C) | 43.2 (6.2) | 51.4 (10.8) | 62.8 (17.1) | 71.4 (21.9) | 80.7 (27.1) | 91.8 (33.2) | 95.9 (35.5) | 92.6 (33.7) | 84.2 (29.0) | 70.2 (21.2) | 55.1 (12.8) | 43.0 (6.1) | 70.2 (21.2) |
| Daily mean °F (°C) | 31.5 (−0.3) | 38.1 (3.4) | 47.4 (8.6) | 55.3 (12.9) | 64.1 (17.8) | 73.7 (23.2) | 79.8 (26.6) | 77.4 (25.2) | 68.0 (20.0) | 54.2 (12.3) | 40.9 (4.9) | 31.4 (−0.3) | 55.2 (12.9) |
| Mean daily minimum °F (°C) | 19.7 (−6.8) | 24.8 (−4.0) | 31.9 (−0.1) | 39.1 (3.9) | 47.6 (8.7) | 55.5 (13.1) | 63.8 (17.7) | 62.2 (16.8) | 51.8 (11.0) | 38.2 (3.4) | 26.8 (−2.9) | 19.7 (−6.8) | 40.1 (4.5) |
| Mean minimum °F (°C) | 6.4 (−14.2) | 12.3 (−10.9) | 19.0 (−7.2) | 25.6 (−3.6) | 34.4 (1.3) | 43.5 (6.4) | 52.1 (11.2) | 52.0 (11.1) | 37.8 (3.2) | 24.2 (−4.3) | 12.7 (−10.7) | 6.8 (−14.0) | 2.1 (−16.6) |
| Record low °F (°C) | −22 (−30) | −13 (−25) | 4 (−16) | 16 (−9) | 23 (−5) | 33 (1) | 40 (4) | 37 (3) | 23 (−5) | 10 (−12) | −2 (−19) | −22 (−30) | −22 (−30) |
| Average precipitation inches (mm) | 0.83 (21) | 0.62 (16) | 0.47 (12) | 0.34 (8.6) | 0.50 (13) | 0.20 (5.1) | 0.62 (16) | 0.94 (24) | 0.84 (21) | 0.77 (20) | 0.48 (12) | 0.67 (17) | 7.28 (185) |
| Average snowfall inches (cm) | 2.5 (6.4) | 1.6 (4.1) | 0.3 (0.76) | 0.0 (0.0) | 0.0 (0.0) | 0.0 (0.0) | 0.0 (0.0) | 0.0 (0.0) | 0.0 (0.0) | 0.1 (0.25) | 0.3 (0.76) | 2.6 (6.6) | 7.4 (19) |
| Average precipitation days (≥ 0.01 in) | 4.3 | 4.0 | 3.5 | 3.2 | 3.2 | 1.2 | 4.5 | 5.0 | 3.9 | 4.0 | 2.7 | 3.8 | 43.3 |
| Average snowy days (≥ 0.1 in) | 1.5 | 0.9 | 0.1 | 0.0 | 0.0 | 0.0 | 0.0 | 0.0 | 0.0 | 0.1 | 0.2 | 1.7 | 4.5 |
Source: NOAA

== Demographics ==
Historical population
| Census | Pop. | Note | %± |
|---|---|---|---|
| 2000 | 320 | | — |
| 2020 | 240 | | — |

As of the census of 2000, there were 320 people, 135 households, and 75 families residing in the town. The population density was 14.5 people per square mile (5.6/km^{2}). There were 191 housing units at an average density of 8.6/sq mi (3.3/km^{2}). The racial makeup of the town was 62.50% White, 35.00% Native American, 0.94% from other races, and 1.56% from two or more races. Hispanic or Latino of any race were 4.06% of the population.

There were 135 households, of which 28.9% had children under 18 living with them, 47.4% were married couples living together, 5.9% had a female householder with no husband present, and 44.4% were non-families. 35.6% of all households were made up of individuals, and 5.2% had someone living alone who was 65 years of age or older. The average household size was 2.37, and the average family size was 3.25.

In the town, the population was spread out, with 25.9% under 18, 8.8% from 18 to 24, 29.1% from 25 to 44, 25.6% from 45 to 64, and 10.6% who were 65 years of age or older. The median age was 38 years. For every 100 females, there were 102.5 males. For every 100 females aged 18 and over, there were 104.3 males.

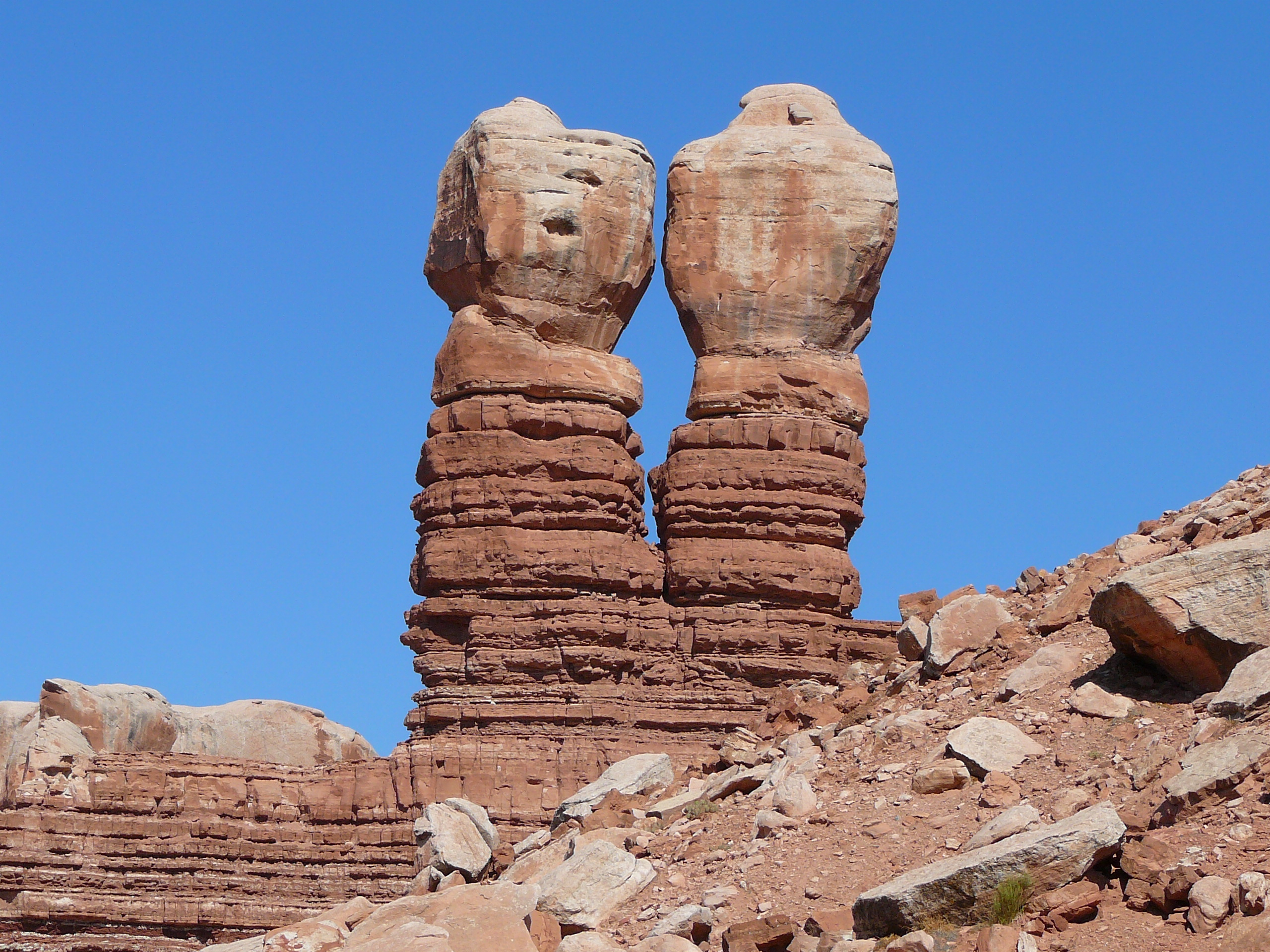
The Navajo Twin Rocks, a landmark in Bluff, November 2007

The median income for a household in the town was $23,906, and the median income for a family was $30,938. Males had a median income of $31,563 versus $14,792 for females. The per capita income for the CDP was $13,567. About 22.8% of families and 21.9% of the population were below the poverty line, including 27.7% of those under age 18 and 25.0% of those aged 65 or over.

== Education ==
The San Juan School District operates Bluff Elementary School in Bluff.

== Attractions and events ==
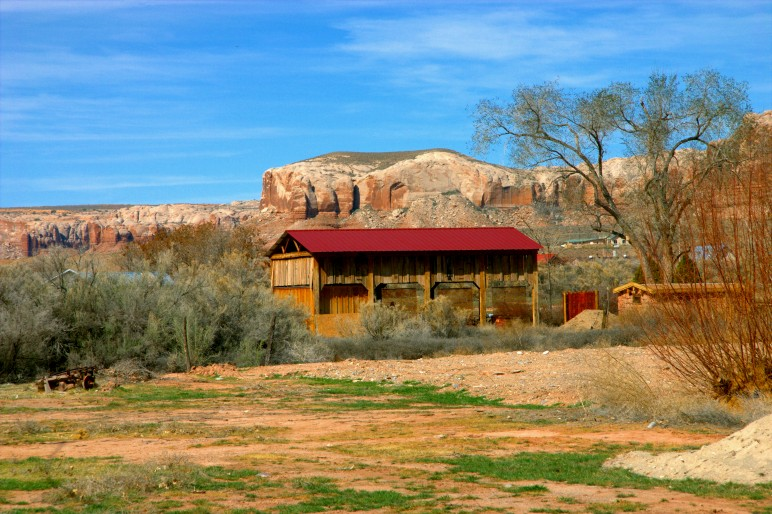
Characteristic scenery of Bluff, Utah

- Bluff Fort
- Navajo Twin Rocks
- Bluff Pioneer Cemetery
- Trading Post
- Bears Ear Education Center
- Historic buildings and sites of Bluff Historic District and other listings on the National Register of Historic Places in Bluff.

Events

- Winter Balloon Festival, January
- Bluff Arts Festival, October and Utah Navajo Fair, September

== Notable people ==
- Charles Lang, cinematographer
- Albert R. Lyman, writer
- Jane McKechnie Walton, pioneer
- Ellen Meloy, writer
- Charles Redd, rancher, member of the Utah House of Representatives

== See also ==
- List of census-designated places in Utah
- Design Build Bluff
