= San Juan River Basin Recovery Implementation Program =

The San Juan River Basin Recovery Implementation Program or (SJRIP) is a river management project that was established to recover two endangered fish species in the San Juan River, the Colorado pikeminnow (Ptychocheilus lucius) and the razorback sucker (Xyrauchen texanus), while allowing water development and management activities to continue in the San Juan River Basin.

The program is a partnership between the United States Fish and Wildlife Service, United States Bureau of Reclamation, Bureau of Land Management, Bureau of Indian Affairs, the states of Colorado and New Mexico, the tribal governments of Navajo Nation, Jicarilla Apache, Southern Ute, and Ute Mountain Ute as well as environmental concerns represented by The Nature Conservancy, and water user interests.

== Program elements ==
The following are the main program elements identified by the Coordination Committee and Biology Committee, which make up the SJRIP.

- Management and Augmentation of Populations of Colorado Pikeminnow and Razorback Sucker
- Protection, Management, and Augmentation of Habitat
- Management of Nonnative Aquatic Species
- Monitoring and Evaluation of Fish and Habitat in Support of Recovery Actions
- Program Coordination and Assessment of Progress toward Recovery
- Information and Education

== History ==
The Program was initiated with the signing of a Cooperative Agreement in 1992 after the rediscovery and documentation of successful spawning by Colorado Pikeminnow and the continued presence of Razorback Sucker in the San Juan River . Adult and young-of-year Colorado Pikeminnow and adult Razorback Sucker were collected during 1987-1989 by biologists gathering detailed fish community data for use in potential Razorback Sucker reintroduction efforts. This discovery resulted in the reinitiation of Section 7 consultation through the Bureau of Reclamation for the Animas–La Plata Project; and subsequently, the Navajo Indian Irrigation Project underwent Section 7 consultation through the Bureau of Indian Affairs.

A 7-year research program, conducted during 1991-1997, provided a baseline of information that identified and characterized factors limiting the two endangered species. The research program was incorporated into the Recovery Program when it was formed in 1992. Culmination of the research program in 1997 marked the end of the research phase and the beginning of the implementation and management phase for the Program. In 1991, a Program Document was developed to provide the framework for Program implementation. The original Document was adopted in 1992 by the Cooperative Agreement signatories. The Document was modified by the Coordination Committee (one of two standing committees) in 2006, 2010, and 2012. The Document(s) outlines the Program’s purposes, authorities, structure, and operating procedures including funding and budgeting. The Document(s) details the purposes of the Program’s committees and defines their composition, authorities, and duties. The Document also includes a description of the process for conducting Section 7 consultations and for reviewing sufficient progress. The Section 7 procedures specifically reference implementation of a long-range plan as the principal means for determination of Endangered Species Act compliance for water projects in the Basin. The Program operates through committee processes that identify the actions needed to attain the Program goals, which also include the Biology Committee whose purpose is to maintain scientific integrity. The committees include representatives of the signatories to the Cooperative Agreement (extended in 2006 to September 30, 2023), including state and federal agencies and Native American Tribes. Water development and conservation interests are also participants of the Program.

== Accomplishments ==
Through 20 years of management and assessment of management actions the SJRIP has re-established adult populations of both Colorado Pikeminnow and Razorback Sucker. This has been accomplished through stocking both species from hatchery produced fish. Additionally, assessment of flow and fish populations have been conducted to determine how best to mimic a natural system. Threats to the species' persistence have been reduced through to enhance recovery potential for the endangered fishes. This program is conducted in parallel with the Upper Colorado River Endangered Fish Recovery Program, both which received the United States Department of Interior Cooperative Conservation award in 2008. The partnership between the two programs resulted in the detection of Razorback Sucker movement between basins which was previously thought to not exist. Through both efforts endangered fish recovery may be possible within the Upper Colorado River Basin. This endangered species recovery program is one of the few programs developed as a "Recovery Implementation Program" and is a successful alternative legal approach to endangered species recovery.
