= Navajo Dam =

Navajo Dam Daʼdeestłʼin (in Navajo)
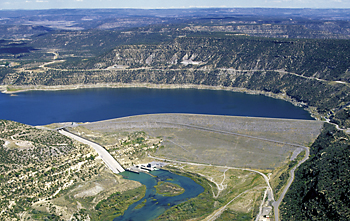
- View of Navajo Dam from the air
- Interactive map of Navajo Dam; Daʼdeestłʼin (in Navajo)
- Country: United States
- Location: San Juan and Rio Arriba Counties, New Mexico
- Coordinates: 36°48′01″N 107°36′45″W
- Construction began: July 30, 1958
- Opening date: April 20, 1963
- Owner: U.S. Bureau of Reclamation

Dam and spillways
- Type of dam: Zoned earthfill embankment
- Impounds: San Juan River
- Height: 402 ft (123 m)
- Length: 3,648 ft (1,112 m)
- Dam volume: 26,840,863 yd^{3} (20,521,312 m^{3})
- Spillway type: Concrete ungated chute
- Spillway capacity: 34,000 cu ft/s (960 m^{3}/s)

Reservoir
- Creates: Navajo Lake
- Total capacity: 1,708,600 acre⋅ft (2.1075 km^{3})
- Catchment area: 3,190 sq mi (8,300 km^{2})
- Surface area: 15,610 acres (6,320 ha)

Power Station
- Operator: City of Farmington
- Commission date: 1986
- Installed capacity: 32 MW
- Annual generation: 135,226,000 kWh

Navajo Dam is a dam on the San Juan River, a tributary of the Colorado River, in northwestern New Mexico in the United States. The 402-foot (123 m) high earthen dam is situated in the foothills of the San Juan Mountains about 44 miles (71 km) upstream and east of Farmington, New Mexico. It was built by the U.S. Bureau of Reclamation (Reclamation) in the 1960s to provide flood control, irrigation, domestic and industrial water supply, and storage for droughts. A small hydroelectric power plant was added in the 1980s.

The dam is a major feature of the Colorado River Storage Project, which is designed to regulate water resources across the entire Upper Colorado River Basin. The reservoir, Navajo Lake, is a popular recreation area and one of the largest bodies of water in New Mexico, with its upper portion extending into Colorado.

== Specifications ==
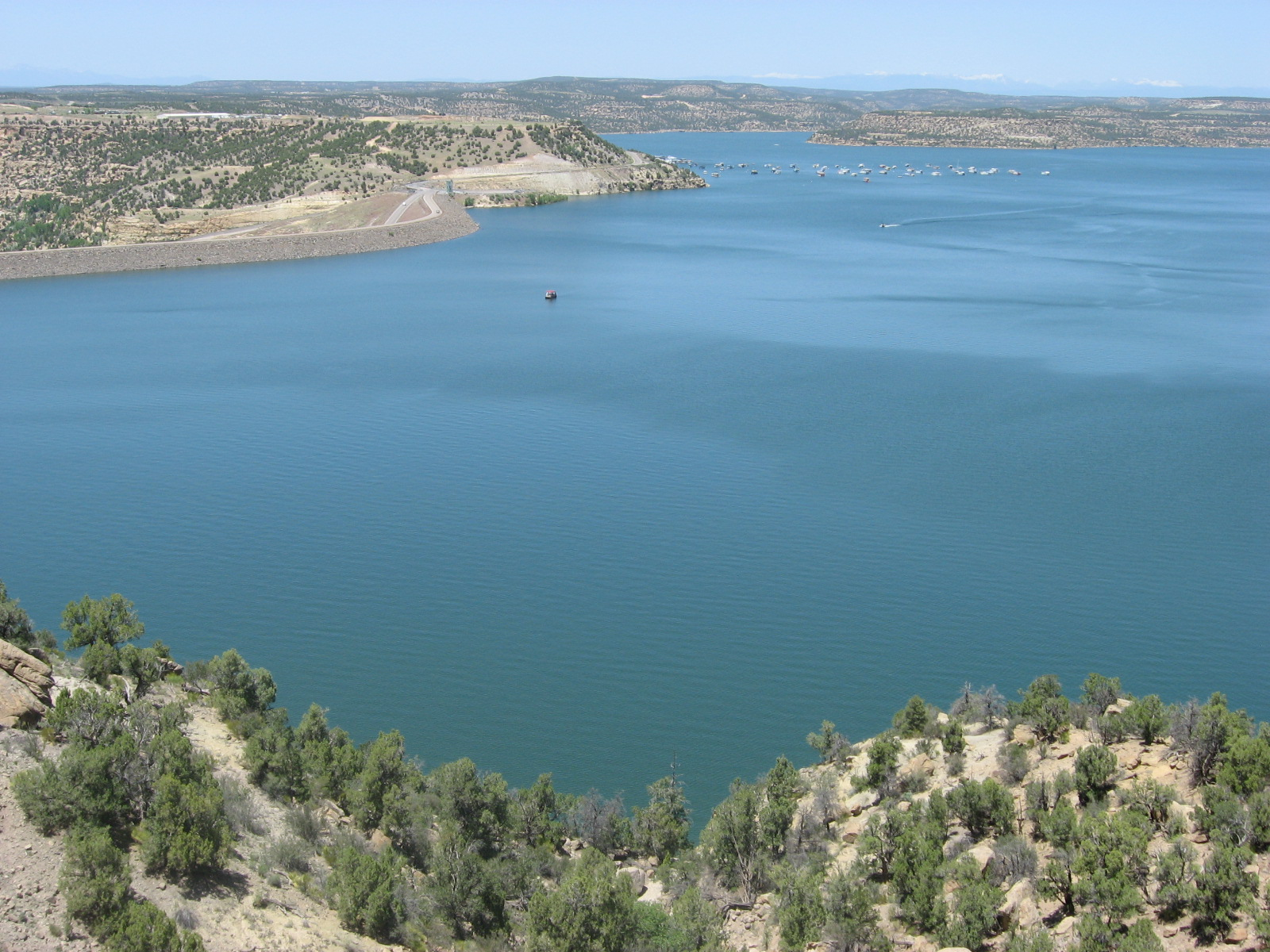
Navajo Lake and back side of Navajo Dam

Navajo is a rolled earthfill embankment dam, composed of three "zones" of alternating cobbles, gravel, sand and clay. The dam is 402 feet (123 m) high and 3,648 feet (1,112 m) long, with a width of 2,566 feet (782 m) at the base and 30 feet (9.1 m) at the crest. The dam contains 26,840,863 cubic yards (20,520,000 m^{3}) of material. The crest of the dam is 6,108 feet (1,862 m) above sea level. The dam forms Navajo Lake, one of the largest lakes in both New Mexico and Colorado with up to 15,610 acres (6,320 ha) of surface water. Navajo Lake extends for 35 miles (56 km) up the San Juan River, 13 miles (21 km) up the Los Pinos River (Pine River) and 4 miles (6.4 km) up the Piedra River. The capacity of Navajo Lake is 1,708,600 acre-feet (2.11 km^{3}), of which 1,036,100 acre-feet (1.28 km^{3}) or 60.6 percent is considered "active" or usable storage.

Prior to the dam's construction, the San Juan River flow was high during spring snowmelt and summer monsoon, and a relative trickle at other times of the year. The dam has enabled a constant water flow throughout the year which benefits water supply, recreation, and flood control. Up to 1,320 cubic feet per second (37 m^{3}/s) of water is released into the San Juan River via a 32 megawatt hydroelectric plant owned by the city of Farmington. Hydropower generated at Navajo Dam serves about 37,000 customers in northwest New Mexico and averaged a production of 135,226,000 kilowatt hours for the period 1989–1999.

Floodwaters can be released through a tunnel outlet with a capacity of 4,200 cubic feet (120 m^{3}) per second, and an ungated concrete spillway with a capacity of 34,000 cu ft/s (960 m^{3}/s). The spillway is 138 feet (42 m) wide at the crest and falls 410 feet (120 m) through a chute to a stilling basin. Flood releases are not to exceed the safe San Juan channel capacity of 5,000 cu ft/s (140 m^{3}/s) below the dam. When the dam was first constructed, water releases were prioritized to meet irrigation demands and provide flood control; however, since the late 1990s the operating criteria have been changed in order to meet environmental restoration goals in the San Juan River (see below).

Navajo Dam is part of the federal Colorado River Storage Project (CRSP), a massive system of dams, reservoirs and irrigation projects across the Upper Colorado River Basin. Operations at Navajo Dam are crucial to ensuring enough water is available for both local San Juan basin users and contract holders of the San Juan–Chama Project, which diverts water from the San Juan River to the Rio Grande valley serving Albuquerque, New Mexico. The San Juan-Chama project uses up to 96,200 acre-feet (0.1187 km^{3}) of water that would otherwise have flowed into Navajo Lake. At Navajo Dam, a large fraction of San Juan River water is diverted into the Navajo Indian Irrigation Project (NIIP), which irrigates 70,000 acres (28,000 ha) of farmland to the south of the river. About 508,000 acre-feet (0.627 km^{3}), or 30 percent of the lake's capacity, are allocated to the NIIP. Current water use by NIIP is about 200,000 acre-feet (0.25 km^{3}) per year, and is expected to increase as more of the NIIP lands are brought into agricultural production. Both the San Juan-Chama and Navajo Irrigation Projects are participating units of the CRSP.

== History ==
The first studies for a dam on the San Juan River were made in 1904, but there was little need for such a project at the time, due to the remoteness of the area. The growth of Farmington and surrounding towns in the 1920s due to agriculture and a petroleum boom created the need for additional water supply as well as flood control, both equal in importance due to the seasonal nature of the San Juan River. The Navajo Nation's growing population was suffering from food and employment shortages, which the Bureau of Reclamation envisioned could be solved by a large irrigation project. The 1908 Supreme Court decision Winters v. United States ruled that a federally established Indian reservation was "entitled to the water needed to create a permanent homeland". In other words, the reservation carried implicit water rights dating back to its creation in 1868; in this case, the Navajo peoples' rights to San Juan River water. This ruling eventually led to development of the Navajo Dam project, which was first outlined in a 1955 Bureau of Indian Affairs report that proposed a "distribution system for irrigation of 137,250 acres (55,540 ha) of new land within and adjacent to the Navajo Indian Reservation, all in New Mexico."

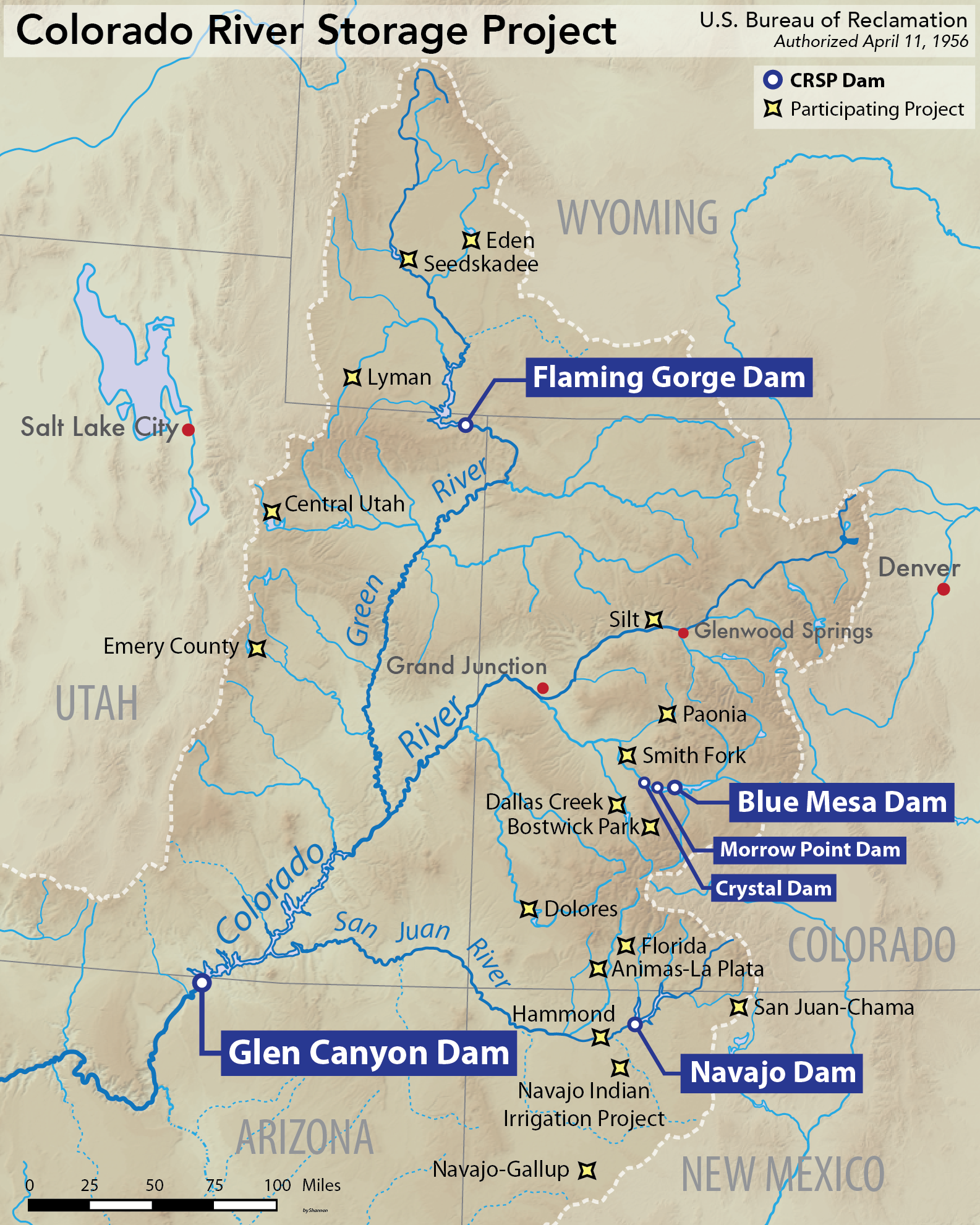
Map of the Colorado River Storage Project

The high dam proposed for the San Juan River ultimately became part of the Bureau of Reclamation's Colorado River Storage Project. Navajo Dam was authorized by Congress in the Colorado River Storage Project Act of April 11, 1956, which also authorized Glen Canyon Dam and numerous irrigation and power projects along the Green River, Gunnison River and other tributaries. The initial authorization for Navajo Dam did not include the Navajo irrigation project, which was authorized much later, in June 1962, along with the San Juan-Chama diversion project.

Preparatory work at the Navajo Dam site started on October 8, 1956 with archaeological excavations of Native American sites along the canyons and bottom lands of the San Juan River; however, these investigations were limited in scope and only preserved a handful of artifacts from the area. A number of sites sacred to the Navajo people would later be flooded with the filling of the lake. Other features to be demolished or relocated included the towns of Rosa and Los Arboles, several cemeteries along the Los Pinos River, and sections of the Denver and Rio Grande Western Railroad. The primary construction contract for the dam was awarded to Morrison–Knudsen, Henry J. Kaiser Company, and F&S Contracting Company on June 25, 1958 and work began a month later on July 30.

The first facilities to be constructed were the water works allowing for diversion of the San Juan River. The main diversion tunnel was completed on January 27, 1959 and the auxiliary tunnel on April 27, 1959. Concrete lining was complete in October and the river was diverted on January 4, 1960 allowing the start of construction on the embankment dam. More than 26,000,000 cubic yards (20,000,000 m^{3}) of material had to be placed to form the main embankment with a record of 1,019,000 cubic yards (779,000 m^{3}) placed during August 1960 alone. As the dam continued to rise, clearing operations in the reservoir basin began on June 30, 1961 and took about a year to complete. The concrete spillway, located to the west of the dam, was finished on September 15, 1961.

On June 27, 1962 the diversion tunnel was blocked, and water was stored in Navajo Lake for the first time. Navajo Lake was the first reservoir of the Colorado River Storage Project to begin filling; the next, Flaming Gorge, would not start filling until November. The main embankment was topped out shortly thereafter on August 22, 1962; however, work on other features of the project, including riprap placement and final concrete work, continued. The dam was dedicated on September 15, 1962 by Secretary of the Interior Stewart Udall, but was not formally completed until April 20, 1963. The total cost of the Navajo Dam project was about $35 million ($373 million in 2025 dollars).

A number of cracks and small slides developed in the dam after its construction in 1964, but were either repaired or settled by themselves without significant structural damage. The dam abutments and the spillway leaked considerably until the 1970s, when the Bureau of Reclamation finally took corrective action by installing drainage systems and placing stabilizing fill. The canal head works and diversion tunnel for the Navajo Indian Irrigation Project were started in 1966 and were completed on July 3, 1967; this allowed the commencement of irrigation water deliveries from Navajo Lake, although the main canal was not completed to its full length until 1977. Operations of the irrigation system were transferred to the Bureau of Indian Affairs shortly thereafter. The reservoir did not fill completely until spring 1973, when it flowed over the spillway for the first time.

Also in 1973, the Bureau of Reclamation also began planning for a hydroelectric power plant at Navajo, which had not been included in the original design of the dam. Construction began in 1976, but was halted when the National Wildlife Federation sued, citing that fluctuating power releases into the San Juan River could cause environmental damage. As a result, Congress did not approve the project. However, in 1981 the city of Farmington applied to the Federal Energy Regulatory Commission for a permit to construct a private hydro power plant at the dam. The Navajo Nation protested, because if the power plant were to be constructed as a private project rather than a public Reclamation project, the Navajo would lose the potential benefits. Ultimately, the Navajo reached an agreement with the city and the power plant was approved for construction in 1986, with the first power generated in 1989.

== Environmental impacts ==
Navajo Dam has greatly changed the ecology of part of the San Juan River, from a warm, muddy and highly seasonal river to a cold-water stream with relatively constant flow. The dam's impacts are most pronounced in the 44 miles (71 km) stretch above Farmington (where the San Juan is joined by the mostly undammed Animas River and regains some of its seasonal variations); further downstream, the dam "apparently has had no significant effect" on the river channel and sediment flow. Under natural conditions, the San Juan River supported native fishes including Colorado pikeminnow, razorback sucker and roundtail chub, but these have been largely been eliminated in favor of rainbow trout, non-native (introduced) brown trout and other salmonids which thrive in the cold water released from the base of Navajo Dam. The San Juan is designated a Blue Ribbon fishery and is one of the most popular fly-fishing waters in the western United States.

After a federal biological assessment in 1999, the San Juan River Basin Recovery Implementation Program (SJRIP) was established in order to help recover native fish populations in the river. Under the program, spring peak releases of 5,000 cubic feet per second (140 m^{3}/s) are made from Navajo Dam. The peak release can be up to 60 days during wet years, but may be suspended during dry years depending on available reservoir storage and predicted inflow. Meanwhile, the dry season base flow is reduced from 500 cubic feet per second (14 m^{3}/s) to 250 cubic feet per second (7.1 m^{3}/s). In combination, these mimic historic high and low flow conditions in the San Juan River before the dam was built. The high flows have been observed to benefit trout, but the low flows have been estimated to result in a 34 percent reduction of trout habitat.

== See also ==
- List of dams in the Colorado River system
- List of dams and reservoirs in the United States

== Works cited ==
- Gahan, Andrew H.; Rowley, William D. (2013). The Bureau of Reclamation: From Developing to Managing Water, 1945-2000. Government Printing Office. ISBN 978-0-16091-364-8.
- Linford, Laurance D. (2000). Navajo places: history, legend, landscape: a narrative of important places on and near the Navajo Reservation, with notes on their significance to Navajo culture and history. Salt Lake City: University of Utah Press. ISBN 0-87480-623-2.
- Linenberger, Toni Rae (1998). "The Navajo Unit". U.S. Bureau of Reclamation.
