= NIIP =

NIIP may refer to:

- Net international investment position
- NII Priborostroyeniya (V.V.Tikhomirov Scientific Research Institute of Instrument Design): Russian institute
- Vega Radio Engineering Corporation was known as MNIIP (Moscow NIIP)
- Navajo Indian Irrigation Project
