= Los Pinos River =

River in southern Colorado and New Mexico

Los Pinos River Pine River
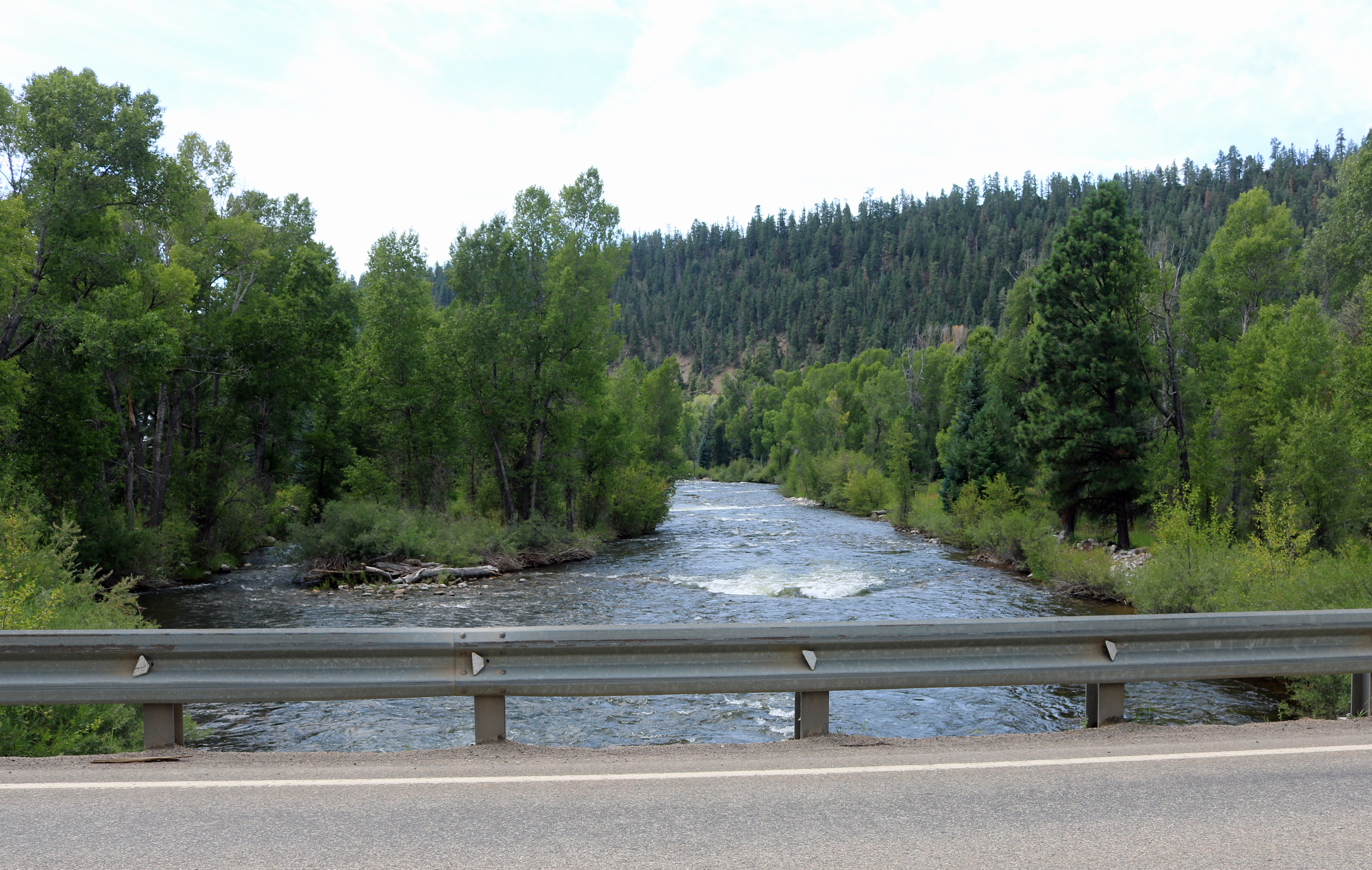
- The river near the intersection of County roads 501 and 245

Physical characteristics
- Source
  - location: Hinsdale County, Colorado
  - coordinates: 37°40′39″N 107°19′09″W
- Mouth
  - location: Confluence with San Juan River
  - coordinates: 36°49′15″N 107°36′06″W
  - elevation: 6,089 ft (1,856 m)

Basin features
- Progression: San Juan—Colorado

Los Pinos River is a tributary of the San Juan River in southern Colorado and northern New Mexico in the United States. The stream flows from a source near Weminuche Pass in the San Juan Mountains of Colorado to a confluence with the San Juan River at Navajo Lake in San Juan County, New Mexico.

The river is impounded by the Vallecito Dam.

The name Los Pinos is Spanish for "the pines," and, in fact, the river is known locally as the Pine River.

== See also ==
- List of rivers of Colorado
- List of rivers of New Mexico
