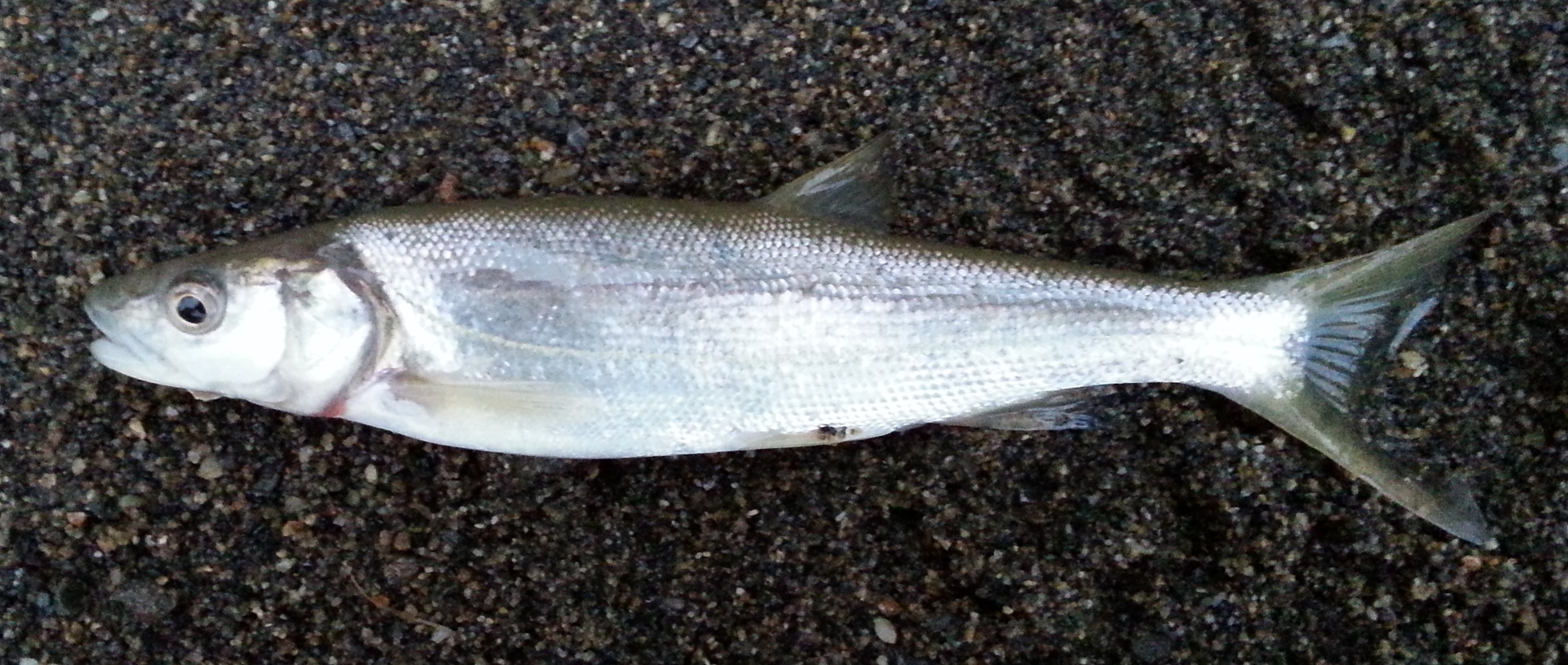

Conservation status
- Least Concern (IUCN 3.1)

Scientific classification
- Kingdom: Animalia
- Phylum: Chordata
- Class: Actinopterygii
- Division: Teleostei
- Order: Cypriniformes
- Family: Leuciscidae
- Genus: Ptychocheilus
- Species: P. oregonensis

Binomial name
- Ptychocheilus oregonensis (J. Richardson, 1836)

Synonyms
- Cyprinus (Leuciscus) oregonensis J. Richardson, 1836; Ptychocheilus gracilis Agassiz & Pickering, 1855; Ptychocheilus rapax Girard, 1856

= Northern pikeminnow =

Species of fish

The Northern pikeminnow, Columbia River dace or colloquially squawfish (Ptychocheilus oregonensis) is a large member of the minnow family, Leuciscidae. This predatory freshwater fish is native to northwestern North America, ranging from the Nass River basin to the Columbia River basin. A good deal of concern has been expressed regarding the impact northern pikeminnow populations may have on salmon in Columbia and Snake River impoundments.

== Naming ==
Until 1999, when the American Fisheries Society officially changed the common name to pikeminnow, the four species of Ptychocheilus were known as squawfish. The renaming effort was undertaken due to the word squaw being an ethnic slur for Native American women.

== Behavior and habitat ==
Northern pikeminnows can live at least 11 years, reaching up to 35 in (89 cm) in total length and 15 lb (6.8 kg) in weight. Female northern pikeminnow reach sexual maturity at about six years, males in three to five. A mature female can lay 30,000 eggs annually. Pikeminnow are adept predators, and in the Columbia and Snake Rivers, salmon smolts comprise a large part of their diets. Their populations have flourished with the development of the Columbia River hydropower system. The reservoirs have provided excellent habitat for pikeminnow and given them an advantage over depressed salmon and steelhead populations.

== Diet ==
Like many freshwater fish that belong to the size range of the pikeminnow, they consume a wide range of food from insects to small fish. However, their diet for the fry of other game fish such as trout or salmon has led to declining populations in those species. It is estimated that Northern Pikeminnows consume up to 650,000 salmon and trout fry each year which is detrimental to those populations.

While the pikeminnow are devastating to the populations of other local fish, their diet does change with age. Younger pikeminnow are seen to feast upon smaller fry and crayfish while, as they mature, the older pikeminnow are seen to consume larger fish such as salmonids, perch, sculpins, and suckers. It has been noted that salmonids are crucial to the size and population increase of northern pikeminnows since consumption rates of salmonids by pikeminnows correlates positively with the growth of mature pikeminnows.

== Relationship with people ==
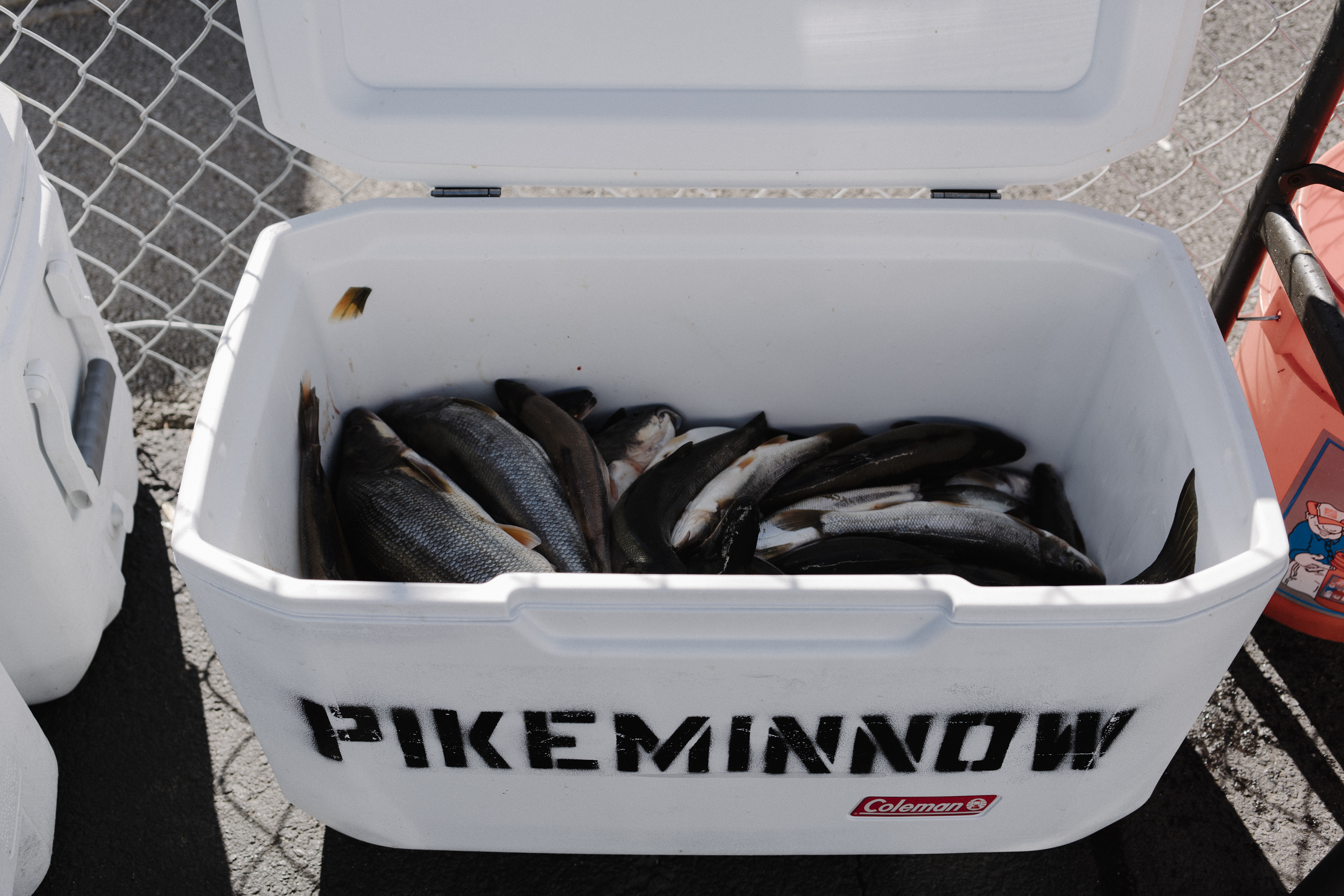
Northern pikeminnow caught as part of the Bonneville Power Administration's Sport Reward Program.

While historically northern pikeminnow have not been of interest commercially nor to sport anglers, Washington and Oregon state fisheries agencies and the Bonneville Power Administration have placed a bounty on them to reduce predation on scarce salmon stocks. A commercial fishery has developed based on that bounty. The current International Game Fish Association all tackle world record for northern pikeminnow is 7 lb 14 oz (3.6 kg) from the Snake River near Almota, Washington.
