= Upper Colorado River Endangered Fish Recovery Program =

The Upper Colorado River Endangered Fish Recovery Program is a multi-agency partnership to recover endangered fish in the upper Colorado River basin while water development proceeds in compliance with state and federal law (e.g., state water law, the Endangered Species Act, and interstate compacts).

== Overview ==
Four species of fish native to the Colorado River basin are in danger of becoming extinct: the Colorado pikeminnow, the razorback sucker, the bonytail, and the humpback chub. The goal of the program is to stem further reductions in numbers of these species and, eventually, to create self-sustaining populations, while water development proceeds in compliance with state and federal law.

== History ==
The program was established in 1988 under a Cooperative Agreement signed by the Secretary of the Interior, the Governors of Colorado, Utah, and Wyoming, and the Administrator of the Western Area Power Administration. In December 2001, those same officials signed an extension of the Agreement that extended the program through September 30, 2013. Recovery Program partners include: the Colorado River Energy Distributors Association, the Colorado Water Congress, the National Park Service, the State of Colorado, the State of Utah, the State of Wyoming, the Nature Conservancy, the U.S. Bureau of Reclamation, the U.S. Fish and Wildlife Service, the Utah Water Users Association, the Western Area Power Administration, the Western Resource Advocates, and the Wyoming Water Association. As originally established, the program consists of five elements:

- provision of instream flows;
- habitat development and maintenance;
- native fish stocking;
- management of nonnative species and sportfishing; and
- research, monitoring, and data management.

== Impact ==
According to a 2004 policy statement:

[N]onnative fishes of immediate primary concern and currently explicitly targeted for management are northern pike (Esox lucius), smallmouth bass (Micropterus dolomieu), and channel catfish (Ictalurus punctatus). These nonnative fish species pose significant threats to the endangered fishes because of their high or increasing abundance and range expansion, their habitat and resource requirements overlap with those of the endangered fish species, and they are known fish predators.

State and federal agencies have also entered into agreements about restricting the stocking of gamefish that might possibly escape into the river;

The Recovery Program believes it will be necessary to remove substantial numbers of the more abundant target nonnative fish species from certain river reaches, and, through research and monitoring, demonstrate sustained reductions in nonnative fish abundance and resulting positive native fish responses at the population level. As deemed appropriate and practical, efforts will be made to relocate nonnative sportfish removed from rivers to local ponds or reservoirs publicly accessible to anglers. Relocation of sportfish will be in compliance with State laws and regulations, in coordination with State fish and wildlife agencies, and in accordance with the 1996 Procedures for Stocking Nonnative Fish Species in the Upper Colorado River Basin. The number or biomass of sportfish relocated to any one body of water in a given year will be determined by State fish and wildlife agencies.

Reports indicate that native species are still rare in many of the areas under study. For example, a 2006 report on 83 habitat areas in the Yampa River, which sampled 14,140 fish, reported only 1.6% of that total (221 fish) were native. It also noted that 86% of these native fishes were taken in isolated pools where few or no smallmouth bass occurred; only 32 native fish were captured in the mainstem, where nonnative predatory species occur, considered an indication of the negative impact of non-native fish. A 2006 report on the middle Green River, following removal of large predatory nonnatives (pike and bass), suggested a small recent (2005–2006) increase in small nonnative cyprinids, but no increases in native species.

Reports like those about the lack of recovery of native species in the Yampa and Green Rivers have fueled public opposition to the sportfish-removal element of the program. In 2006, Colorado Wildlife Commissioner Rick Enstrom, appointed as the Commission's representative of the state's sportsmen, and an outspoken critic of the sportfish removal aspects of the recovery program, stated:

Colorado leads the nation in T & E [threatened and endangered]recovery success stories, and most have been accomplished through habitat manipulation or stocking, not the elimination of top tier predators.

Opponents of sportfish removal blame the decline of native fish on habitat loss through dam construction and irrigation diversions in the river basin, and claim that nonnative introduced sportfish serve largely as a scapegoat.
