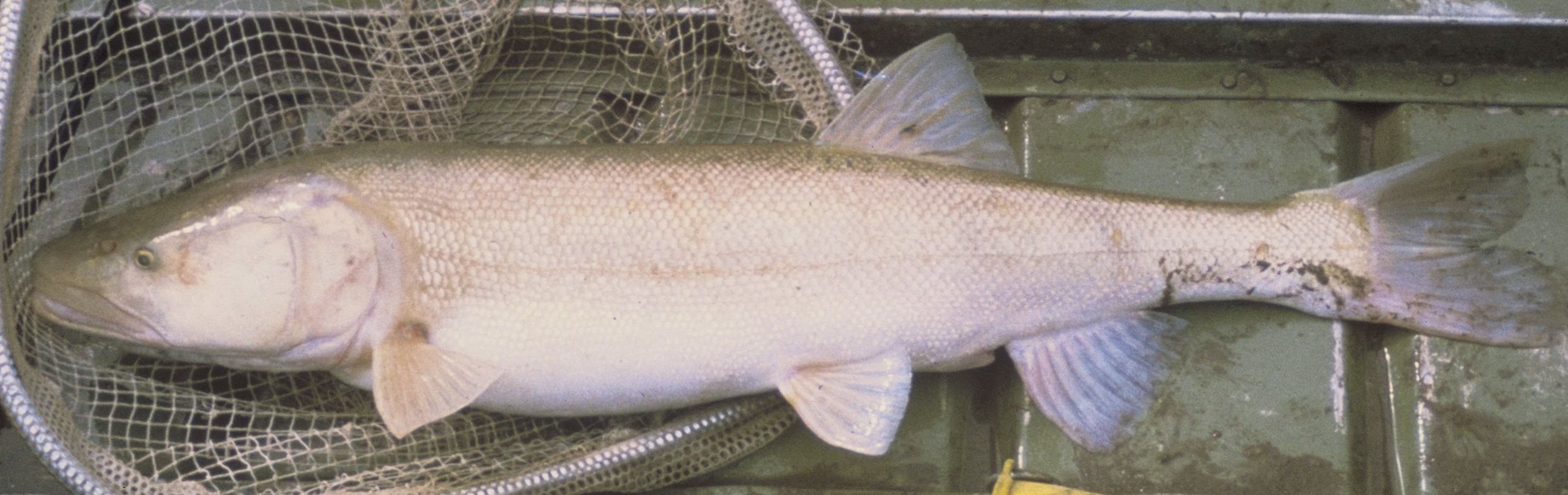
- Colorado pikeminnow (Ptychocheilus lucius)

Scientific classification
- Kingdom: Animalia
- Phylum: Chordata
- Class: Actinopterygii
- Order: Cypriniformes
- Family: Leuciscidae
- Subfamily: Laviniinae
- Genus: Ptychocheilus; Agassiz, 1855

Type species
- Ptychocheilus gracilis Agassiz & Pickering, 1855

Species
- See text

= Ptychocheilus =

Ptychocheilus Temporal range: Late Miocene to present Possible Late Eocene occurrence

Genus of fishes

Ptychocheilus, the pikeminnows or squawfish, is a genus of freshwater ray-finned fishes belonging to the family Leuciscidae, which includes the daces, chubs, Eurasian minnows, and related species. These fishes are native to western North America. Voracious predators, they are considered an "undesirable" species in many waters, largely due to the species' perceived tendency to prey upon small trout and salmon. First known in western science by the common name Columbia River dace, the four species all became lumped under the name "squawfish". In 1999, the American Fisheries Society adopted "pikeminnow" as the name it recommends, because Native Americans consider "squawfish" offensive.

The Colorado pikeminnow, P. lucius, is the largest member of the genus, ranging from 4–9 lb (2–4 kg) in adult fish with occasional specimens up to 25 lb (11 kg). Historical and anecdotal reports of Colorado pikeminnows nearing 6 ft (1.8 m) in length and 80 lb (36 kg) in weight have been made. The species is near extinction in its native Colorado River Basin habitat, due to extensive habitat destruction.

On the Columbia and Snake Rivers from roughly May through September, anglers are paid for each northern pikeminnow that they catch (from within program boundaries) that is 9 inches (23 cm) or larger in total length, and the more one catches, the higher the reward. Rewards begin at $5 each for the first 25 northern pikeminnow caught during the season. Anglers are paid $6 for 26–200 fish, and $8 for every fish caught over 200, cumulatively. Anglers are also paid $500 for each specially tagged northern pikeminnow.

== Species ==
The four recognized species are:

| Ptychocheilus grandis | (Ayres, 1854) | Sacramento pikeminnow |
| Ptychocheilus lucius | (Girard, 1856) | Colorado pikeminnow |
| Ptychocheilus oregonensis | (J. Richardson, 1836) | northern pikeminnow |
| Ptychocheilus umpquae | (Snyder, 1908) | Umpqua pikeminnow |

Two fossil species are also known:
- †P. arciferus Cope, 1870 (Pliocene of Idaho)
- †P. prelucius Uyeno & Miller, 1965 (Late Miocene-aged Bidahochi Formation of Arizona)

In addition, the partial fossils of a large minnow with presumed affinities to Ptychocheilus have been recovered from the Late Eocene or Early Oligocene-aged deposits of the Cypress Hills Formation in Saskatchewan.
