= Navajo Indian Irrigation Project =

Water management project in New Mexico

The Navajo Indian Irrigation Project (NIIP) (Navajo: Dáʼákʼeh Ntsaa) is a large agricultural development located in the northwest corner of New Mexico. The NIIP is one of the largest Native American owned and operated agricultural businesses in the United States. This venture finds its origins in the 1930s when the federal government was looking for economic development for the Navajo Nation. The NIIP was approved in 1962 by Congress. The Bureau of Reclamation received the task of constructing this project.

The water supply is provided by Navajo Lake, the reservoir formed behind Navajo Dam on the San Juan River. Water is transported southwest and distributed via 70.2 miles (113.0 km) of main canals and 340 miles (550 km) of laterals. The project service area is composed of the high benchlands south of Farmington, which experience an arid climate.

Originally designed to provide jobs for Native American family farms the project has transformed into a large corporate entity. The project was authorized on June 13, 1962 for the irrigation of 110,630 acres (44,770 ha), and construction began in 1964. The canal systems and most of the drainage systems were completed by the end of 1977, and farmland was gradually brought into production in "blocks" averaging 10,000 acres (4,000 ha). As of 2011, seven blocks totaling 63,881 acres (25,852 ha) of farmland were irrigated, with an eighth block under development.

The project is entitled to 508,000 acre-feet (0.627 km^{3}) of San Juan River water each year.
