= Vallecito Dam =

Coordinates: 37°22′44″N 107°34′25″W

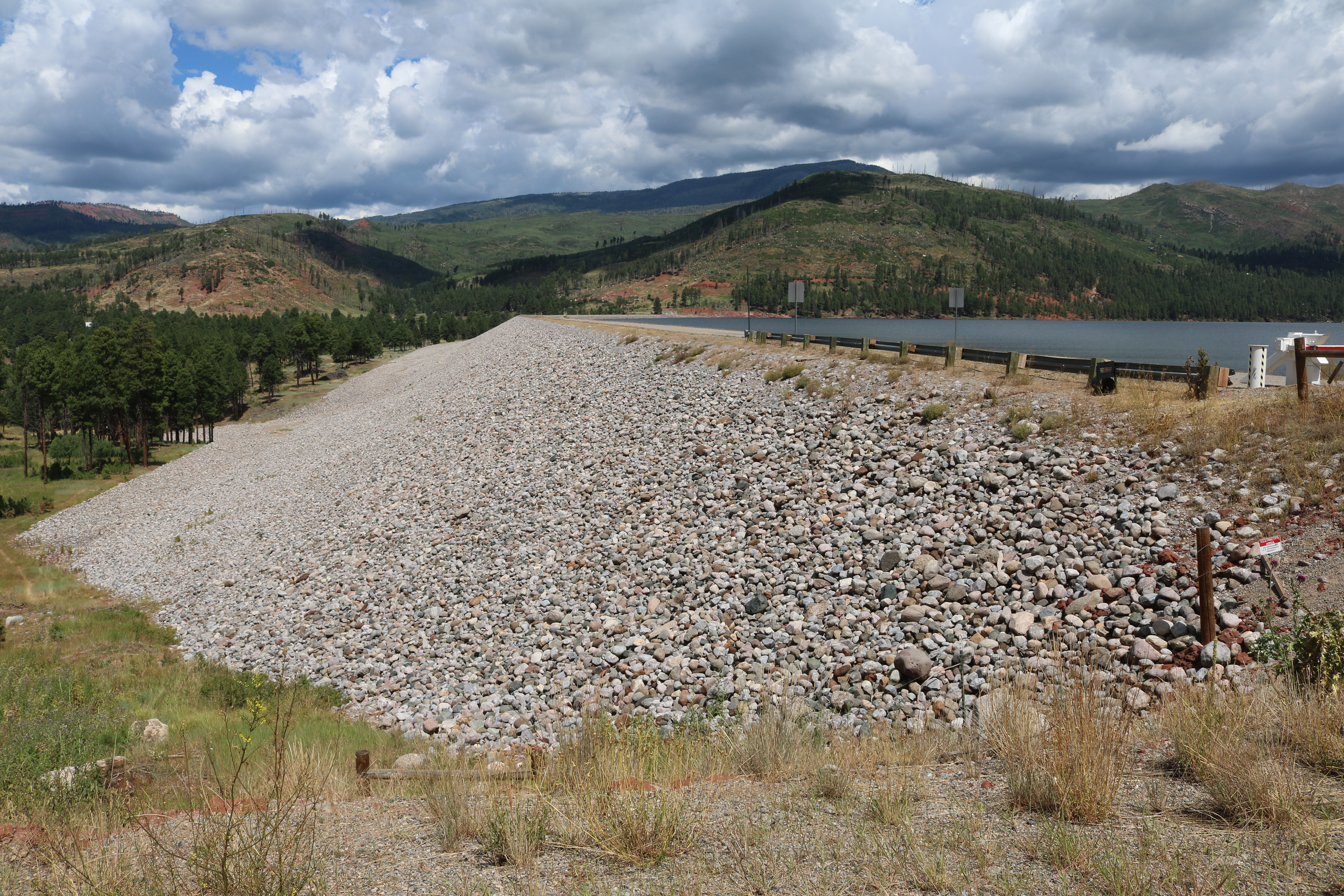
- Interactive map of Vallecito Dam
- Country: United States
- Location: La Plata County, Colorado
- Status: Operational
- Opening date: 1940
- Built by: United States Bureau of Reclamation
- Designed by: Civilian Conservation Corps
- Operator: Pine River Irrigation District

Dam and spillways
- Height: 162 ft (49 m)
- Length: 4,010 ft (1,220 m)

Reservoir
- Total capacity: 125,400 acre⋅ft (154,700,000 m^{3})
- Surface area: 4.3 sq mi (11 km^{2})
- Normal elevation: 2,338 m (7,671 ft)

Vallecito Dam (National ID # CO01695) is a dam in La Plata County, Colorado about 18 miles (29 km) northeast of Durango.

Trees were cleared for the reservoir by the Civilian Conservation Corps. The earthen dam was constructed in 1940 by the United States Bureau of Reclamation, with a height of 162 feet (49 m), and a length at its crest of 4,010 feet (1,220 m). It impounds the Los Pinos River for irrigation water storage. The dam is owned by the Bureau and is operated by the local Pine River Irrigation District.

The reservoir it creates, Vallecito Reservoir, has a water surface of 4.3 square miles (11 km^{2}) and a maximum capacity of 125,400 acre-feet (154,700,000 m^{3}). Recreational opportunities include fishing, hunting, boating, camping and hiking.

== Climate ==
Climate data for Vallecito Dam, Colorado, 1991–2020 normals, 1917-2020 records: 7644ft (2330m)
Month	Jan	Feb	Mar	Apr	May	Jun	Jul	Aug	Sep	Oct	Nov	Dec	Year
Record high °F (°C)	62 (17)	63 (17)	71 (22)	79 (26)	87 (31)	92 (33)	93 (34)	91 (33)	90 (32)	82 (28)	70 (21)	62 (17)	93 (34)
Mean maximum °F (°C)	49.5 (9.7)	51.3 (10.7)	61.7 (16.5)	69.3 (20.7)	77.2 (25.1)	85.4 (29.7)	88.1 (31.2)	85.0 (29.4)	81.2 (27.3)	72.9 (22.7)	60.5 (15.8)	50.8 (10.4)	88.4 (31.3)
Mean daily maximum °F (°C)	38.0 (3.3)	40.8 (4.9)	49.1 (9.5)	56.8 (13.8)	65.7 (18.7)	76.8 (24.9)	81.1 (27.3)	78.7 (25.9)	72.5 (22.5)	60.9 (16.1)	48.3 (9.1)	38.5 (3.6)	58.9 (15.0)
Daily mean °F (°C)	22.6 (−5.2)	26.0 (−3.3)	34.8 (1.6)	42.0 (5.6)	50.2 (10.1)	59.4 (15.2)	65.0 (18.3)	63.2 (17.3)	56.4 (13.6)	45.6 (7.6)	34.4 (1.3)	25.3 (−3.7)	43.7 (6.5)
Mean daily minimum °F (°C)	7.2 (−13.8)	11.1 (−11.6)	20.4 (−6.4)	27.2 (−2.7)	34.6 (1.4)	42.1 (5.6)	48.8 (9.3)	47.8 (8.8)	40.3 (4.6)	30.3 (−0.9)	20.5 (−6.4)	12.1 (−11.1)	28.5 (−1.9)
Mean minimum °F (°C)	−9.0 (−22.8)	−6.7 (−21.5)	3.5 (−15.8)	15.4 (−9.2)	24.4 (−4.2)	32.3 (0.2)	41.3 (5.2)	40.9 (4.9)	29.6 (−1.3)	18.3 (−7.6)	4.6 (−15.2)	−5.6 (−20.9)	−12.0 (−24.4)
Record low °F (°C)	−35 (−37)	−31 (−35)	−21 (−29)	−6 (−21)	15 (−9)	20 (−7)	32 (0)	28 (−2)	22 (−6)	2 (−17)	−10 (−23)	−22 (−30)	−35 (−37)
Average precipitation inches (mm)	2.52 (64)	2.14 (54)	1.69 (43)	1.36 (35)	1.66 (42)	0.88 (22)	2.57 (65)	3.24 (82)	3.36 (85)	2.34 (59)	1.93 (49)	2.07 (53)	25.76 (653)
Average snowfall inches (cm)	19.60 (49.8)	21.20 (53.8)	10.40 (26.4)	3.60 (9.1)	0.60 (1.5)	0.00 (0.00)	0.00 (0.00)	0.00 (0.00)	0.00 (0.00)	0.70 (1.8)	7.40 (18.8)	21.40 (54.4)	84.9 (215.6)
Average precipitation days (≥ 0.01 in)	6.1	7.3	6.3	5.8	7.7	4.6	12.8	14.9	10.7	7.3	5.3	7.7	96.5
Average snowy days (≥ 0.1 in)	5.5	6.5	4.7	2.0	0.3	0.0	0.0	0.0	0.0	0.6	3.7	7.2	30.5
Source 1: NOAA
Source 2: XMACIS2 (records & monthly max/mins)
