= Navajo Lake =

Reservoir in New Mexico and Colorado, United States

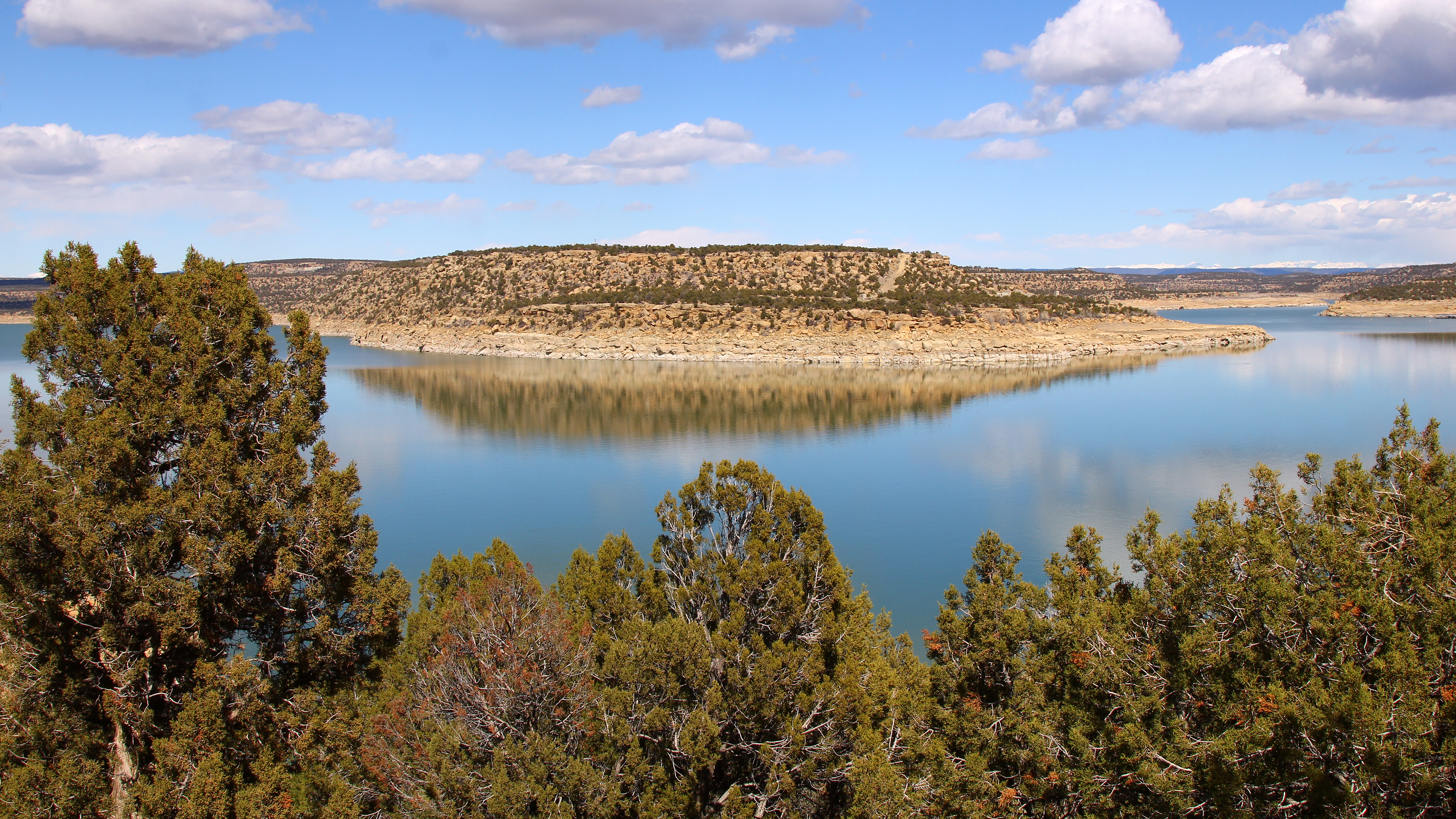
- A view of Navajo Lake from Navajo Lake State Park.

- Location within New Mexico Location within Colorado Location within the United States
- Location: Rio Arriba / San Juan counties in New Mexico; Archuleta County in Colorado, United States
- Coordinates: 36°50′52″N 107°37′07″W
- Type: reservoir
- Primary inflows: San Juan River, Piedra River
- Primary outflows: San Juan River
- Catchment area: 3,190 sq mi (8,300 km^{2})
- Basin countries: United States
- Surface area: 15,600 acres (63 km^{2})
- Water volume: 1,708,600 acre⋅ft (2.1075 km^{3})
- Surface elevation: 6,085 ft (1,855 m)
- Website: Official website

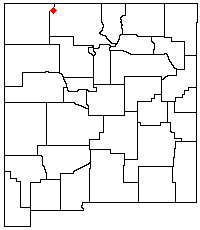
Location of Navajo Lake within New Mexico

Navajo Lake is a reservoir located in San Juan County and Rio Arriba County in northwestern New Mexico, in the southwestern United States. Portions of the reservoir extend into Archuleta County in southern Colorado. The lake is part of the Colorado River Storage Project, which here manages the upper reaches of the San Juan River, storing and releasing water that is used locally for irrigation, or ultimately reaching the Colorado River in Utah. Water is impounded in Navajo Lake by the earth- and rock-filled Navajo Dam, 3,800 feet (1,200 m) long and 400 feet (120 m) high, completed in 1962. The 15,600-acre (63 km^{2}) lake is over 25 miles (40 km) long and lies at an elevation of up to 6,085 feet (1,855 m).

The construction of the dam and the resulting lake flooded and destroyed one of the Navajos' most sacred sites.

The Lake and associated shoreline areas near the dam in New Mexico and the river shorelines below the dam are part of New Mexico's Navajo Lake State Park, while the Portion of the shoreline and portion of the lake that is located in Colorado make up Navajo State Park which is managed as part of the Colorado State Parks system. The lake has smallmouth bass, black crappie, northern pike, channel catfish, and trout. The lake also is home to a healthy population of kokanee salmon, which though nonnative to the lake, are thriving. The waters of Navajo Lake forced hundreds of families to leave their homes and communities. The four communities affected were Los Arboles, Los Pinos, Rose and Los Martinez. The 1.7 million acre-foot reservoir displaced an unknown amount of farms and ranches. It has been estimated that almost 200 families had to move. Some families had been living there for nearly 80–90 years.

== See also ==
- List of largest reservoirs of Colorado
