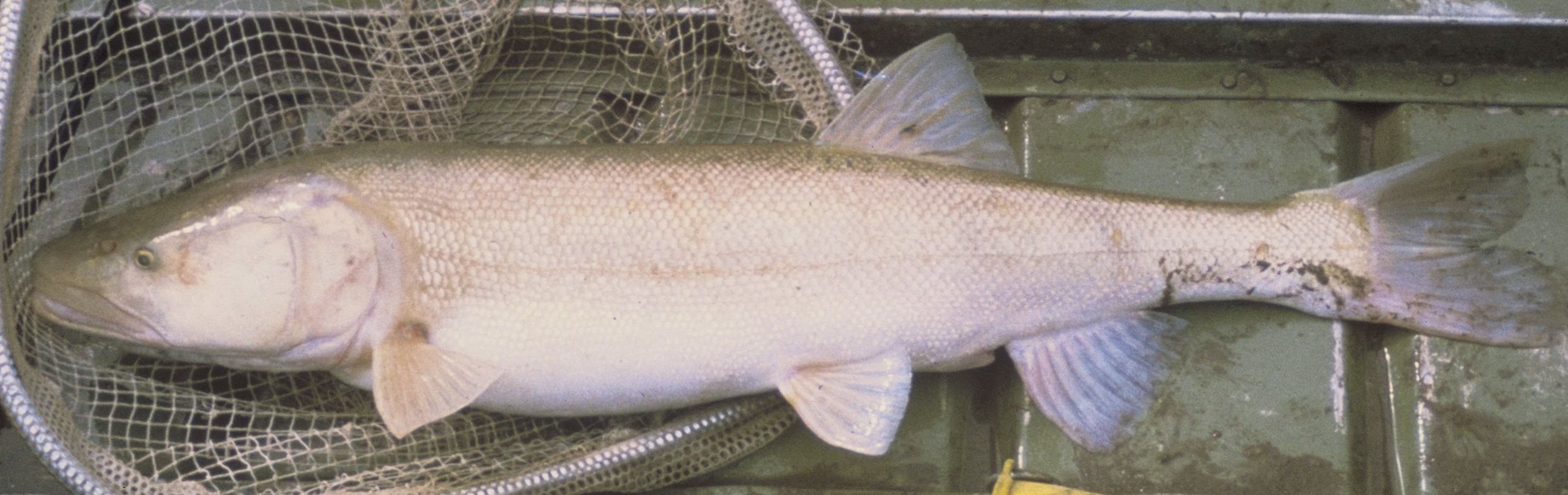

Conservation status
- Vulnerable (IUCN 3.1)

- Critically Imperiled (NatureServe)

Scientific classification
- Kingdom: Animalia
- Phylum: Chordata
- Class: Actinopterygii
- Order: Cypriniformes
- Family: Leuciscidae
- Subfamily: Laviniinae
- Genus: Ptychocheilus
- Species: P. lucius

Binomial name
- Ptychocheilus lucius Girard, 1856

= Colorado pikeminnow =

Species of fish

The Colorado pikeminnow (Ptychocheilus lucius), formerly known as the squawfish, is a species of freshwater ray-finned fish belonging to the family Leuciscidae, the daces, chubs, Eurasian minnows, and related species. This is one of the largest leuciscids of North America and one of the largest in the world, with reports of individuals up to 6 ft (1.8 m) long and weighing over 100 pounds (45 kg). Native to the Colorado River Basin of the Southwestern United States and adjacent Mexico, it was formerly an important food fish for both Native Americans and European settlers. Once abundant and widespread in the basin, its numbers have declined to where it has been extirpated from the Mexican part of its range and was listed as endangered in the US part in 1967, a fate shared by the three other large Colorado Basin endemic fish species - bonytail chub, humpback chub, and razorback sucker. The Colorado pikeminnow is currently listed as vulnerable by the IUCN, while its NatureServe conservation status is "critically imperiled".

== Description ==
Like the other three species of pikeminnows, it has an elongated body reminiscent of the pike. The cone-shaped and somewhat flattened head is elongated, forming nearly a quarter of the body length. Color grades from bright olive green on the back to a paler yellowish shade on the flanks, to white underneath. Young fish also have a dark spot on the caudal fin. Both the dorsal and anal fins typically have 9 rays. The pharyngeal teeth are long and hooked. No teeth are in the jaw, however, and the lip folds back to create a fleshy mouth.

The reports of 6 ft (2 m) individuals are estimates from skeletal remains, but a number of community elders, interviewed by the Salt Lake Tribune in 1994, reported that such individuals were once common. Catches in the 1960s ranged up to 60 cm (24 in) for 11-year-old fish, but by the early 1990s, maximum sizes reached no more than 34 cm (13 in). Biologists now consider the typical size of an adult pikeminnow to be between 4 and 9 pounds (1.8 and 4.1 kg), and reports of the fish lately exceeding 3 feet (0.91 m) in length are now in question.

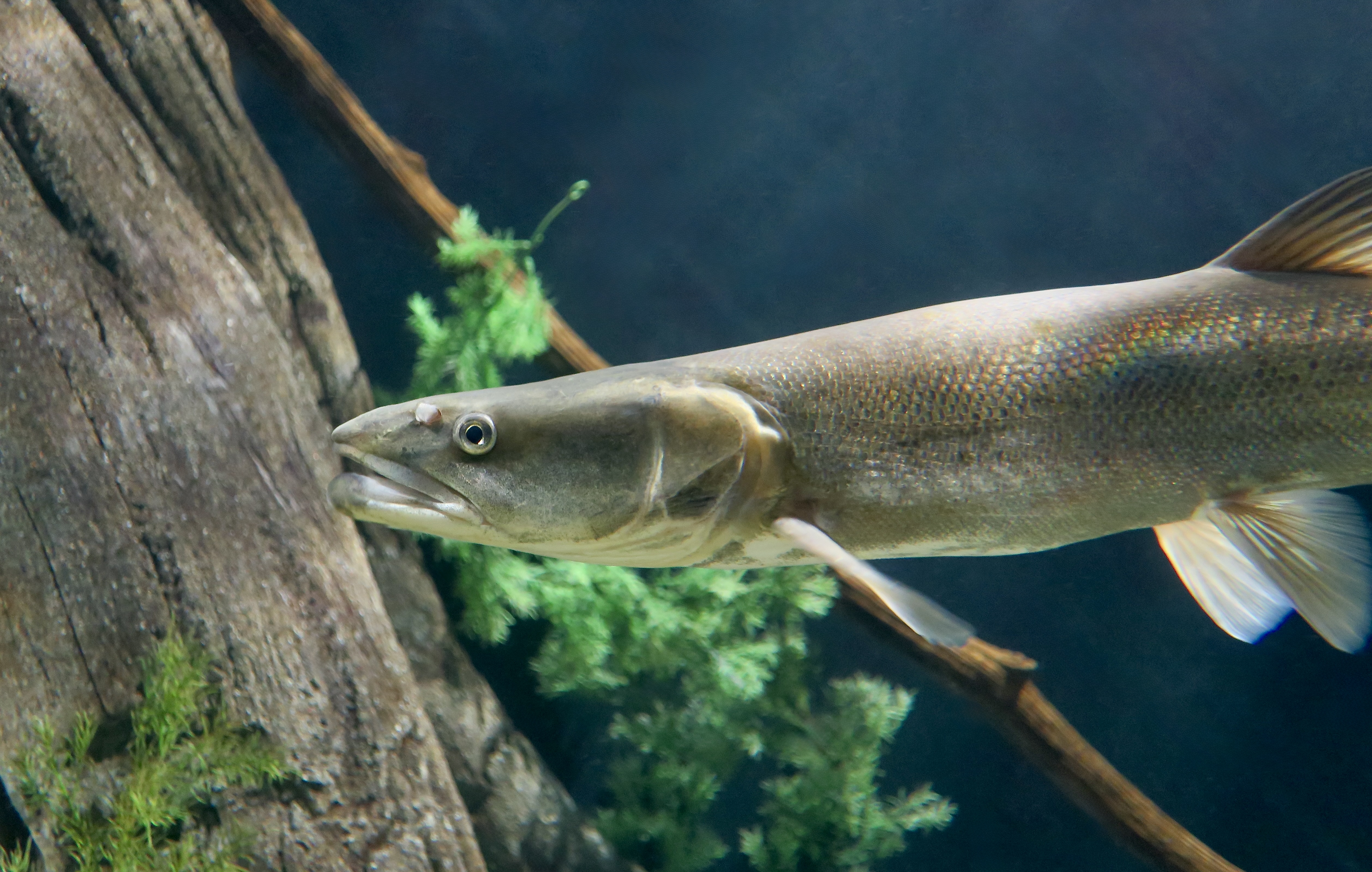
A Colorado pikeminnow at OdySea Aquarium

== Biology and reproduction ==
Young pikeminnows, up to 5 cm (2 in) long, eat cladocerans, copepods, and chironomid larvae, then shift to insects around 10 cm (4 in) long, gradually eating more fish as they mature. Once they achieve a length around 30 cm (12 in), they feed almost entirely upon fish.

This fish has an ontogenetic separation of life history stage. The altricial young emerge from whitewater canyons, enter the drift as sac fry, and are transported downstream. Habitat for the young fish is predominately alongshore backwaters and associated shorelines of more alluvial reaches of the turbulent and turbid rivers of the Colorado system. In contrast, adults reside in more well-defined channels, where they seek eddy habitats and prey on suckers and minnows. Colorado pikeminnows are potamodromous, making freshwater spawning migrations to home in on their natal areas. These migrations can begin as upstream or downstream movements, depending on the location of home range of individuals, and may involve 100 kilometres (62 mi) or more. Spawning occurs around the summer solstice, with declining flows and increasing temperatures. Breeding males are bronze-colored and heavily covered with tubercles, while females are generally larger, lighter in color, and with fewer tubercles. As the fish reach the spawning location, they stage in deeper pools and eddies and make spawning runs into nearby runs and deep riffles, where the adhesive eggs are released. Once a female lays her eggs, male follows the trail of eggs, dispersing milt. These eggs hatch at different rates based on the temperature of the water. When the water was around 20 °C (68 °F), eggs hatched within 3–5 days, and at a higher temperature of 25 °C (77 °F), eggs hatched in around 2–3 days. Upon hatching and swim-up, the small fry are entrained and carried 50–100 km (31–62 mi) downstream.

== Range ==
The species was once found throughout the Colorado Basin, so occurred in Arizona, California, Colorado, Nevada, New Mexico, Utah, and Wyoming, as well as in Mexico. Damming and habitat alterations have confined the species to the upper Colorado drainage; currently, remnant populations are known from the Green, Gunnison, White, San Juan, and Yampa Rivers. They have been transplanted to the Salt and Verde Rivers, both within their native range.

== Threats ==
The Colorado pikeminnow once resided in much of the Colorado River Basin, but due to human impacts and the introduction of non-native fish species, the population has receded to the upper basin. According to the Native Aquatic Species Conservation in Arizona, the installation of dams has altered the fish's movement. Along with this, dewatering, altered stream flow, channel morphology, water quality, water chemistry, silt loads, and introduction of non-native fish have challenged the Colorado pikeminnow. Due to the installation of dams, the change in water temperature is thought to have altered breeding tendencies. Breeding is water temperature=dependent, meaning the temperature of the water must be perfect for spawning to occur. Changes in these conditions have caused breeding grounds to change. Non-native fish have posed a threat in both predation and competition for resources. With the introduction of various invasive catfish species, greenback cutthroat trout, and red shiner (Cyprinella lutrensis), the population of Colorado pikeminnow has declined drastically. A study was conducted analyzing the factors of recruiting young Colorado pikeminnow. In particular, red shiners feed on the larvae of Colorado pikeminnow in vivo.

Additionally, land managers in the past have attempted to reduce the native fish population of the Colorado Basin in favor of sport fishing. In the mid-1960s, the federal government poured the poison rotenone into the Green and San Juan Rivers, attempting to create an environment supportive of non-native sportfish. In September 1962, the Green River was poisoned beginning upstream of Flaming Gorge. The poison worked downstream for 3 days until it reached upstream of Dinosaur National Monument. Potassium permanganate was used to neutralize the rotenone, but concentrations were higher than expected and rotenone continued into the Dinosaur National Monument area.

== Restoration efforts ==
Recovery efforts are focused on operating dams to create more natural flow patterns, improving fish passage up- and downstream, and restricting stocking of non-native fish to reduce ecological interactions. In Arizona, hatcheries are in the process of restocking the Upper basin with Colorado pikeminnow. The Native Aquatic Species Conservation in Arizona reported that small fish could not avoid predation and that the only successful site for reintroduction was the Green River, more specifically the upper Green River. Fish up to 16 inches (410 mm) long have been released in the hopes of increasing the survival rate of the Colorado pikeminnow. Some evidence has shown that population numbers are increasing in the San Juan River.

The Colorado pikeminnow was one of the first species listed under the Endangered Species Act in 1973 as endangered, due to its extirpation from the Lower Colorado River Basin following damming in the early 20th century. A stocking program in the Verde River has been discontinued due to futility, and current conservation efforts are aimed at preserving pikeminnow populations in three subbasins within the Upper Colorado River - the Green River, the Upper Colorado River, and the San Juan River. A draft recovery plan published in 2022 projected a cost of nearly US$180 million over 15 years to recover the Colorado pikeminnow through management of water flow, maintenance of fish passages, and control of non-native species, among other measures.
