= National Register of Historic Places listings in San Juan County, New Mexico =

Location of San Juan County in New Mexico

This is a list of the National Register of Historic Places listings in San Juan County, New Mexico.

This is intended to be a complete list of the properties and districts on the National Register of Historic Places in San Juan County, New Mexico, United States. Latitude and longitude coordinates are provided for many National Register properties and districts; these locations may be seen together in a map.

There are 38 properties and districts listed on the National Register in the county. All of the listings within the county with the single exception of the Aztec Ruins Administration Building-Museum are also recorded on the State Register of Cultural Properties.

This National Park Service list is complete through NPS recent listings posted September 26, 2025.

Contents: NRHP in New Mexico by county
Bernalillo – Catron – Chaves – Cibola – Colfax – Curry – De Baca – Doña Ana – Eddy – Grant – Guadalupe – Harding – Hidalgo – Lea – Lincoln – Los Alamos – Luna – McKinley – Mora – Otero – Quay – Rio Arriba – Roosevelt – San Juan – San Miguel – Sandoval – Santa Fe – Sierra – Socorro – Taos – Torrance – Union – Valencia

== Current listings ==
	Name on the Register	Image	Date listed	Location	City or town	Description
1	H.D. Abrams House		February 21, 1985 (#85000322)	403 N. Church; 36°49′30″N 107°59′34″W	Aztec	
2	American Hotel	American Hotel	February 21, 1985 (#85000323)	300 S. Main; 36°49′07″N 107°59′55″W	Aztec	
3	Archeological Site OCA-CGP-56		February 23, 1978 (#78001822)	Address Restricted	Fruitland	
4	Austin-McDonald House		February 21, 1985 (#85000324)	501 Rio Grande; 36°49′33″N 107°59′27″W	Aztec	
5	Aztec Main Street Historic District	Aztec Main Street Historic District	February 21, 1985 (#85000321)	Bounded by Main E., Chuska S., and alley between Park and Main W., and Chaco N. 36°49′19″N 107°59′54″W	Aztec	
6	Aztec Motor Company Building	Aztec Motor Company Building	February 21, 1985 (#85000325)	301 S. Main; 36°49′08″N 107°59′57″W	Aztec	
7	Aztec Ruins Administration Building-Museum	Aztec Ruins Administration Building-Museum	October 11, 1996 (#96001041)	Approximately 0.75 miles north of U.S. Route 550, on the outskirts of Aztec in the Aztec Ruins National Monument; 36°50′04″N 107°59′58″W	Aztec	Archeologist Earl Morris lived and worked here; now a visitors center.
8	Aztec Ruins National Monument	Aztec Ruins National Monument	October 15, 1966 (#66000484)	1 mile north of Aztec; 36°50′09″N 107°59′51″W	Aztec	
9	D.C. Ball House	D.C. Ball House	February 21, 1985 (#85000326)	300 San Juan; 36°49′26″N 107°59′18″W	Aztec	
10	Building at 202 Park Avenue		February 21, 1985 (#85000328)	202 Park Ave. 36°49′17″N 107°59′58″W	Aztec	
11	Building at 500 White Avenue		February 21, 1985 (#85000327)	500 White Ave. 36°49′34″N 107°59′31″W	Aztec	
12	Christmas Tree Ruin (LA 11097)		January 21, 1987 (#86003646)	Address Restricted	Farmington	
13	Church Avenue-Lovers Lane Historic District	Church Avenue-Lovers Lane Historic District	February 21, 1985 (#85000329)	Bounded by Rio Grande E., Zia S., Park W., and U.S. Route 550; 36°49′22″N 107°59′41″W	Aztec	
14	Cottonwood Divide Site (LA 55829)		January 21, 1987 (#86003644)	Address Restricted	Farmington	
15	Crow Canyon Archaeological District	Crow Canyon Archaeological District	July 15, 1974 (#74001200)	Address Restricted	Farmington	Extends into Rio Arriba County
16	Daws-Keys House		February 21, 1985 (#85000330)	421 N. Church; 36°49′32″N 107°59′44″W	Aztec	
17	Denver and Rio Grande Western Railway Depot	Denver and Rio Grande Western Railway Depot	February 21, 1985 (#85000331)	314 Rio Grande; 36°49′26″N 107°59′22″W	Aztec	
18	East Side Rincon Site		December 15, 1985 (#85003154)	3 miles north of Farmington; 36°43′41″N 108°13′07″W	Farmington	
19	Engleman-Thomas Building	Engleman-Thomas Building	February 21, 1985 (#85000332)	200 S. Main; 36°49′15″N 108°00′07″W	Aztec	
20	Farmington Historic Downtown Commercial District	Farmington Historic Downtown Commercial District	December 20, 2002 (#02001551)	Approximately 8 blocks along Main St. and Broadway, from Auburn Ave. to Miller Ave. 36°43′43″N 108°12′22″W	Farmington	
21	Gallegos Wash Archeological District		November 20, 1975 (#75001165)	Southeast of Farmington	Farmington	
22	Hadlock's Crow Canyon No. 1 (LA 55830)		January 21, 1987 (#86003642)	On a beach at the confluence of Cuervo Canyon and Canon Largo; 36°32′37″N 107°37′55″W	Farmington	
23	Halfway House Archeological Site		October 10, 1980 (#80002565)	Address Restricted	Bloomfield	
24	Jaquez Site Ruin		December 10, 1984 (#84001281)	South of the San Juan River; 36°45′05″N 108°11′59″W	Farmington	
25	Lower Animas Ditch		March 19, 1987 (#87001116)	Lower Animas Ditch from Church Ave. to Lovers Lane Historic District; 36°50′32″N 107°58′54″W	Aztec	
26	Harvey McCoy House		February 21, 1985 (#85000333)	725 Pioneer; 36°49′45″N 107°59′37″W	Aztec	
27	McCoy-Maddox House		February 21, 1985 (#85000334)	Northwestern corner of the junction of Maddox and NE. Aztec Boulevard; 36°49′45″N 107°59′21″W	Aztec	
28	McGee House		February 21, 1985 (#85000335)	501 Sabena St. 36°49′52″N 107°59′20″W	Aztec	
29	Morris' No. 41 Archeological District		May 17, 1979 (#79001548)	Address Restricted	La Plata	
30	Florence and John R. Pond House		September 25, 2013 (#13000773)	1875 NM 170; 36°59′23″N 108°11′13″W	La Plata	
31	Prieta Mesa Site (LA 11251)		January 21, 1987 (#86003647)	Southeast of Blanco off Road 4450; 36°39′39″N 107°37′58″W	Farmington	
32	Salmon Ruin	Salmon Ruin	September 4, 1970 (#70000406)	Address Restricted	Farmington	
33	San Juan River Bridge at Shiprock	San Juan River Bridge at Shiprock	July 15, 1997 (#97000740)	U.S. Route 666 over the San Juan River; 36°46′53″N 108°41′31″W	Shiprock	Six-span Parker through truss bridge.
34	Simon Canyon (LA 5047)	Simon Canyon (LA 5047)	January 21, 1987 (#86003645)	North of State Road 511 on the western edge of Navajo Lake State Park; 36°49′22″N 107°39′32″W	Farmington	
35	Site No. OCA-CGP-54-1		April 19, 1978 (#78001823)	Address Restricted	Fruitland	
36	Site OCA-CGP-605		February 17, 1978 (#78003261)	Address Restricted	Fruitland	
37	Star Rock Refuge (LA 55838)		January 21, 1987 (#86003643)	Address Restricted	Farmington	
38	Twin Angels Archeological Site		October 10, 1980 (#80002566)	On a ridge point overlooking the center fork of Kutz Canyon; 36°35′22″N 107°56′33″W	Bloomfield	

== See also ==
- List of National Historic Landmarks in New Mexico
- National Register of Historic Places listings in New Mexico
