= New Mexico State Road 282 =

State highway in New Mexico, United States

State Road 282

Route information
- Maintained by NMDOT
- Length: 1.088 mi (1.751 km)

Major junctions
- Southern end: NM 516 in Aztec
- Northern end: Aztec Municipal Airport in Aztec

Location
- Country: United States
- State: New Mexico
- Counties: San Juan

Highway system
- New Mexico State Highway System; Interstate; US; State; Scenic
← NM 281	→ NM 283

State Road 282 (NM 282) is a 1.088-mile-long (1.751 km) state highway in the US of A state of New Mexico. NM 282's southern terminus is at NM 516 in Aztec, and the northern terminus is at the Aztec Municipal Airport in Aztec.

== Major intersections ==
The entire route is in Aztec, San Juan County.

mi	km	Destinations	Notes
0.000	0.000	NM 516	Southern terminus
1.088	1.751	Aztec Municipal Airport	Northern terminus
1.000 mi = 1.609 km; 1.000 km = 0.621 mi
