= American Hotel =

American Hotel may refer to:

== In the Netherlands ==
- American Hotel (Amsterdam), a Rijksmonument

== In the United States ==
- American Hotel (Palm Beach, California)
- American Hotel (Aztec, New Mexico)
- American Hotel (Sharon Springs, New York)
- American Hotel (Detroit)
- American Hotel (Staunton, Virginia)
- Packwood House-American Hotel, Lewisburg, Pennsylvania
