= Aztec Ruins Administration Building-Museum =

Entrance to Aztec Ruins National Monument, New Mexico

- Aztec Ruins Administration Building/Museum
- U.S. National Register of Historic Places
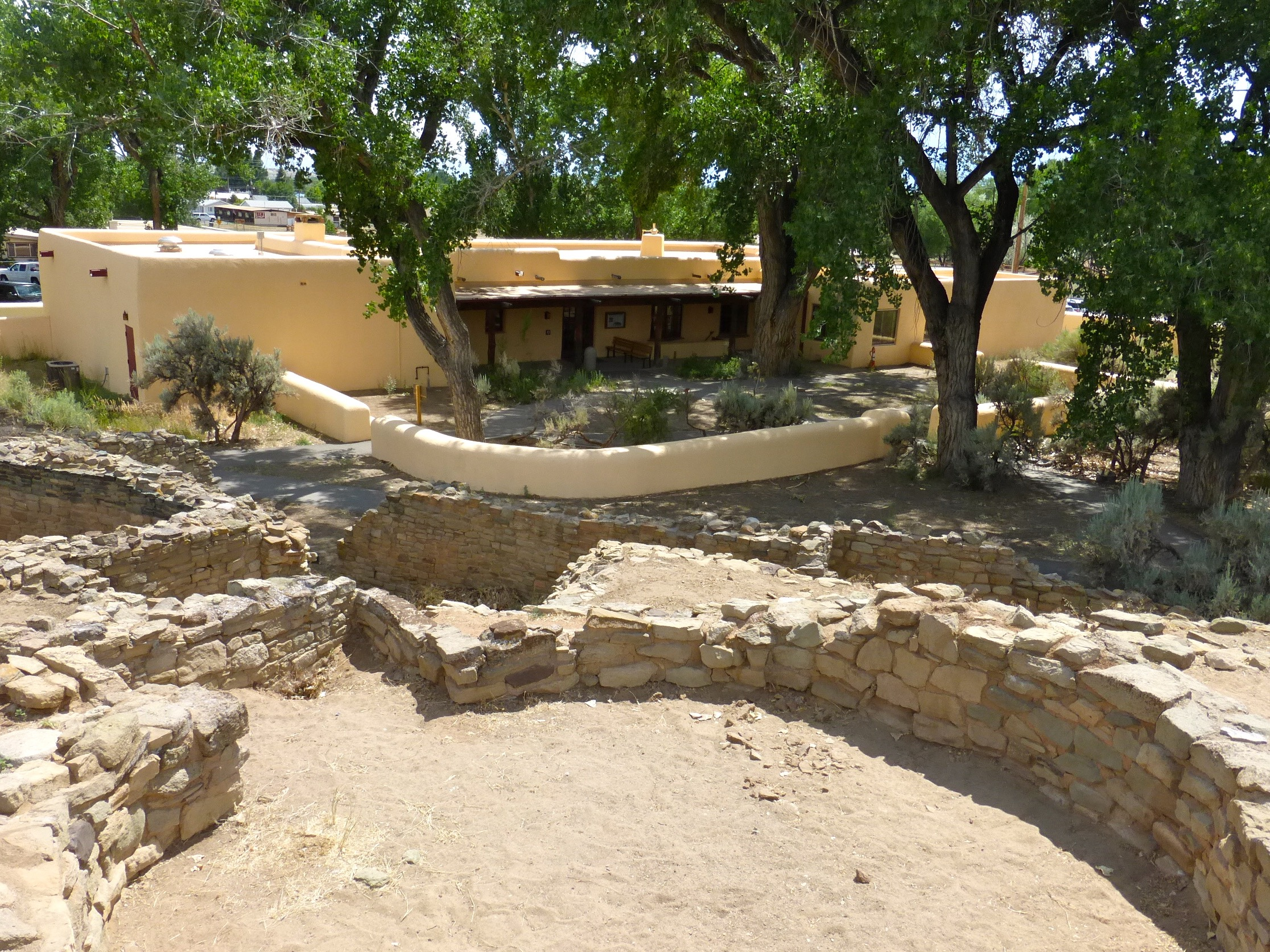

- Location within New Mexico
- Nearest city: Aztec, New Mexico
- Coordinates: 36°50′04″N 107°59′58″W
- Area: 1.8 acres (0.73 ha)
- Built: 1919
- Built by: Earl Morris; Clark Wissler, et al.
- Architectural style: Mission/spanish Revival, pueblo revival
- NRHP reference No.: 96001041
- Added to NRHP: October 11, 1996

The Aztec Ruins Visitor Center, also known as the Aztec Ruins Administration Building/Museum, by the main entrance to the Aztec Ruins National Monument, on the outskirts of Aztec, New Mexico, was built in 1919. It is located approximately 0.75 miles north of U.S. Route 550, by the Animas River. It was listed on the National Register of Historic Places in 1996.

It was a field station of the American Natural History Museum. Archeologist Earl Morris lived and worked here.
