= Lower Animas Ditch =

- U.S. National Register of Historic Places
- Location within New Mexico
- Location: Lower Animas Ditch from Church Ave. to Lovers Lane Historic District, Aztec, New Mexico
- Coordinates: 36°50′32″N 107°58′54″W
- Area: 4.9 acres (2.0 ha)
- Built: 1878
- MPS: Aztec New Mexico Historic MRA
- NRHP reference No.: 87001116
- Added to NRHP: March 19, 1987

The Lower Animas Ditch, in Aztec, New Mexico, was listed on the National Register of Historic Places in 1987.

The ditch brings irrigation water from the Animas River. Only the portion within Aztec city limits, and of that only the "Main Ditch" above Zia Street, is included in the listing. The listed stretch was important in the city's development. It supplies the area of the Church Avenue-Lovers Lane Historic District.

It is from four to eight feet deep, and six to fifteen feet wide. It is dug out from the ground a couple feet, and is contained by a two-foot or so tall dirt embankment. It was put into service in 1878.
