= Engleman-Thomas Building =

- U.S. National Register of Historic Places
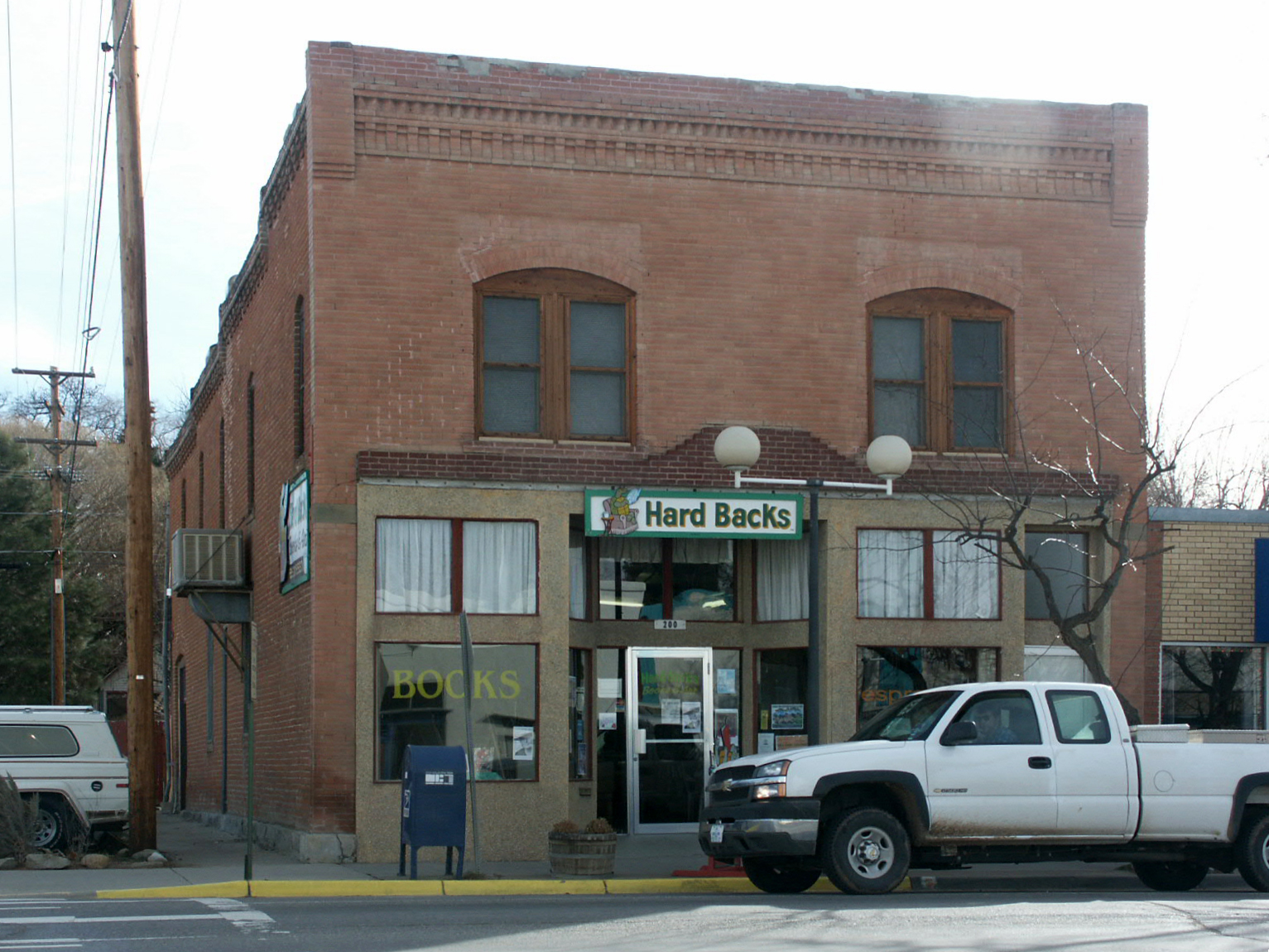
- The building in 2003

- Location within New Mexico
- Location: 200 S. Main, Aztec, New Mexico
- Coordinates: 36°49′15″N 108°00′07″W
- Area: less than one acre
- Built: 1906
- MPS: Aztec New Mexico Historic MRA
- NRHP reference No.: 85000332
- Added to NRHP: February 21, 1985

The Engleman-Thomas Building, at 200 S. Main in Aztec, New Mexico, was built in 1906. It was listed on the National Register of Historic Places in 1985.

It is a brick-walled building with brick sills and segmental arches, and with "corbelled and zipperbrick cornice." Its interior includes a row of chamfered wooden posts with wooden corbel capitals running down the middle of the open first floor.

Its significance in 1985 was assessed as follows: "Built in 1906, this commercial building typifies the often modest construction which accompanied the city's railroad boom. Built of local brick, its ornamentation is concentrated in its Decorative Brick style cornices—a zipperbrick and dentil cornice on the front and a corbeled cornice stepping down along the side. The original owner, N. M. Engleman, and later J. M. Thomas operated dry goods stores on the ground floor. Short-term lodgings and an office occupy the second floor. Indian motifs are painted on window shades behind the facade transoms. These are the result of a suggestion in the 1960s by an Albuquerque planning consultant that the community cater to tourists visiting the Aztec Ruins National Monument by adopting an Indian theme. The fan tile in the sidewalk corners (visible in ills. 9) are also a result of this ill-fated notion."

It has also been known as Old Post Office.
