= Denver and Rio Grande Depot =

Denver and Rio Grande Depot, Denver and Rio Grande Western Depot, Denver and Rio Grande Western Railroad Depot or Denver and Rio Grande Western Railway Depot may refer to:

- Denver and Rio Grande Western Railroad Depot (Grand Junction, Colorado), in Colorado
- Denver and Rio Grande Depot (Montrose, Colorado), in Colorado
- Denver and Rio Grande Western Railway Depot (Aztec, New Mexico), in New Mexico
- Denver and Rio Grande Western Depot (Salt Lake City), in Utah
