= N19 =

N19 may refer to:

== Roads ==
- N19 road (Belgium), a National Road in Belgium
- Route nationale 19, in France
- N19 road (Ireland)
- Nebraska Highway 19, in the United States

== Other uses ==
- N19 (Long Island bus)
- Aztec Municipal Airport, in Aztec, New Mexico, United States
- HMS Utmost (N19), a submarine of the Royal Navy
- London Buses route N19
- Nitrogen-19, an isotope of nitrogen
- N19, a postcode district in the N postcode area
