= New Mexico State Road 574 =

State highway in New Mexico, United States

State Road 574
- NM 574 highlighted in red

Route information
- Maintained by NMDOT
- Length: 14.3 mi (23.0 km)

Major junctions
- South end: NM 516 in Aztec
- North end: NM 170 in La Plata

Location
- Country: United States
- State: New Mexico
- Counties: San Juan

Highway system
- New Mexico State Highway System; Interstate; US; State; Scenic
← NM 573	→ NM 575

State Road 574 (NM 574) is a 14.3-mile-long (23.0 km) state highway in the US state of New Mexico. NM 574's southern terminus is at NM 516 in Aztec, and the northern terminus is at NM 170 in La Plata.

== Major intersections ==
The entire route is in San Juan County.

Location	mi	km	Destinations	Notes
Aztec	0.000	0.000	NM 516	Southern terminus
La Plata	14.300	23.014	NM 170	Northern terminus
1.000 mi = 1.609 km; 1.000 km = 0.621 mi
