= Florence and John R. Pond House =

- U.S. National Register of Historic Places
- Location within New Mexico
- Location: 1875 NM 170, La Plata, New Mexico
- Coordinates: 36°59′23″N 108°11′13″W
- Area: less than one acre
- Built: 1890; 136 years ago
- Built by: Pond, John R.
- Architectural style: Colonial Revival
- NRHP reference No.: 13000773
- Added to NRHP: September 25, 2013

The Florence and John R. Pond House, at 1875 NM 170 in La Plata, New Mexico, was built in 1890. It was listed on the National Register of Historic Places in 2013.

It was deemed significant "for its connection to the community of La Plata and the La Plata River valley road, the main transportation route connecting northwestern New Mexico with southwestern Colorado during the late 19th century. Florence and John R. Pond were among the earliest Euro-American settlers in the La Plata valley, arriving in 1877. John R. Pond became the first postmaster of La Plata, and the site upon which the house was built served as the community's first post office. vi The house was a stage stop and supported a smithy along the road connecting Farmington and Aztec with old Fort Lewis and Durango. At its height, La Plata was one of the largest communities in San Juan County but its importance had declined by the time the Pond family left in 1902. The house stands as testimony to a time when the La Plata River valley played a vital role in the development of the region. The building is architecturally significant as an excellent local example of the Georgian Revival style and remains as the oldest stone masonry house constructed by Euro-Americans in San Juan County."
