= Colorado State Highway 140 =

State highway in Colorado, United States

State Highway 140
- SH 140 highlighted in red

Route information
- Maintained by CDOT
- Length: 23.435 mi (37.715 km)

Major junctions
- South end: NM 170 at the New Mexico state line near La Plata, NM
- North end: US 160 in Hesperus

Location
- Country: United States
- State: Colorado
- Counties: La Plata

Highway system
- Colorado State Highway System; Interstate; US; State; Scenic
← SH 139	→ SH 141

State Highway 140 (SH 140) is a 23.435 mi (37.715 km) long state highway in the southwestern corner of Colorado. SH 140's southern terminus is at New Mexico State Road 170 (NM 170) at the New Mexico state line, and the northern terminus is at U.S. Route 160 (US 160) west of Durango.

== Route description ==
SH 140 begins in the south on the Southern Ute Indian Reservation at the New Mexico state line where the road becomes New Mexico State Road 170 coming from Farmington, NM. From the state line, the road proceeds northward passing near the town of Marvel and reaching its northern terminus at US 160 near the small town of Hesperus roughly eleven miles west of Durango.

== Major intersections ==
The entire route is in La Plata County.

Location	mi	km	Destinations	Notes
	0.000	0.000	NM 170 – Farmington	Continuation beyond New Mexico state line; Southern terminus
Hesperus	23.435	37.715	US 160 – Mancos, Durango	Northern terminus
1.000 mi = 1.609 km; 1.000 km = 0.621 mi
