= H.D. Abrams House =

Historic house in New Mexico, United States

- H. D. Abrams House
- U.S. National Register of Historic Places
- Location within New Mexico Location within the United States
- Location: 403 N. Church St., Aztec, New Mexico
- Coordinates: 36.825°N 107.9928°W
- Area: less than one acre
- Built: c.1906
- Architectural style: Free Classic
- MPS: Aztec New Mexico Historic MRA
- NRHP reference No.: 85000322
- Added to NRHP: February 21, 1985

The H. D. Abrams House, a Free Classic style house located at 403 N. Church St. in Aztec, New Mexico, was built in c.1906. It was listed on the National Register of Historic Places in 1985.

It was built by H.D. Abrams, whose family moved to a 160 acres (0.65 km^{2}) homestead in Aztec in 1904. The property included artifacts and ruins. Abrams supported protection of the ruins. The site was recognized and protected in 1923 as the Aztec Ruins National Monument.

Abrams was active in the town, serving on its board, on the school board, and as mayor.
