= Hesperus, Colorado =

Unincorporated community in La Plata County, CO, USA

- Unincorporated community
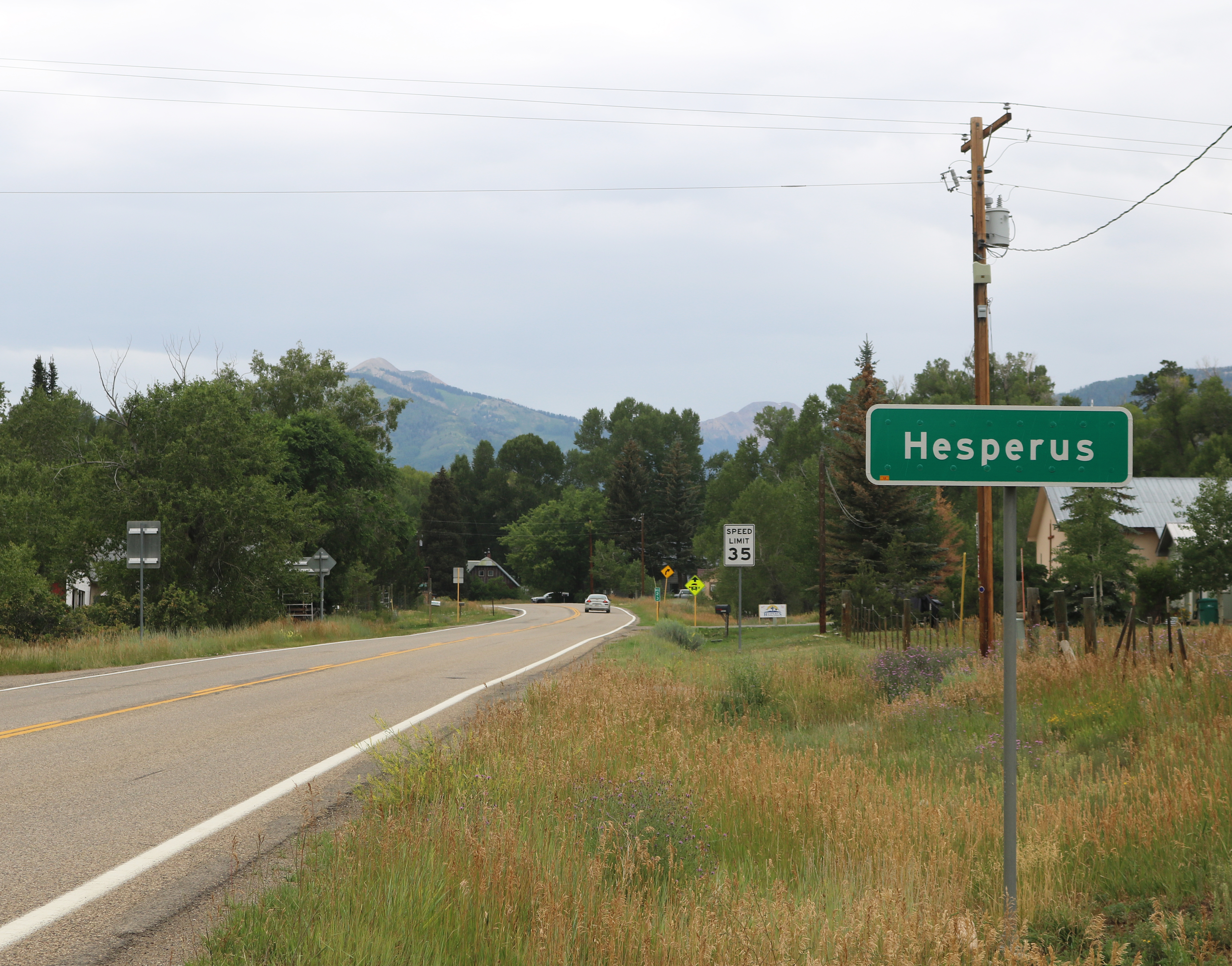
- Entering Hesperus from the south on State Highway 140

- Location within Colorado Location within the United States
- Coordinates: 37°17′10″N 108°02′22″W
- Country: United States
- State: Colorado
- Counties: La Plata
- Elevation: 8,091 ft (2,466 m)
- Time zone: UTC-7 (MST)
  - Summer (DST): UTC-6 (MDT)
- ZIP code: 81326
- Area code: 970
- GNIS feature ID: 179135

Hesperus is an unincorporated community and a U.S. Post Office in La Plata County, Colorado, United States. The Hesperus Post Office has the ZIP Code 81326.

A post office called Hesperus has been in operation since 1891. The community takes its name from nearby Hesperus Mountain.

== Hesperus Baptist Church ==
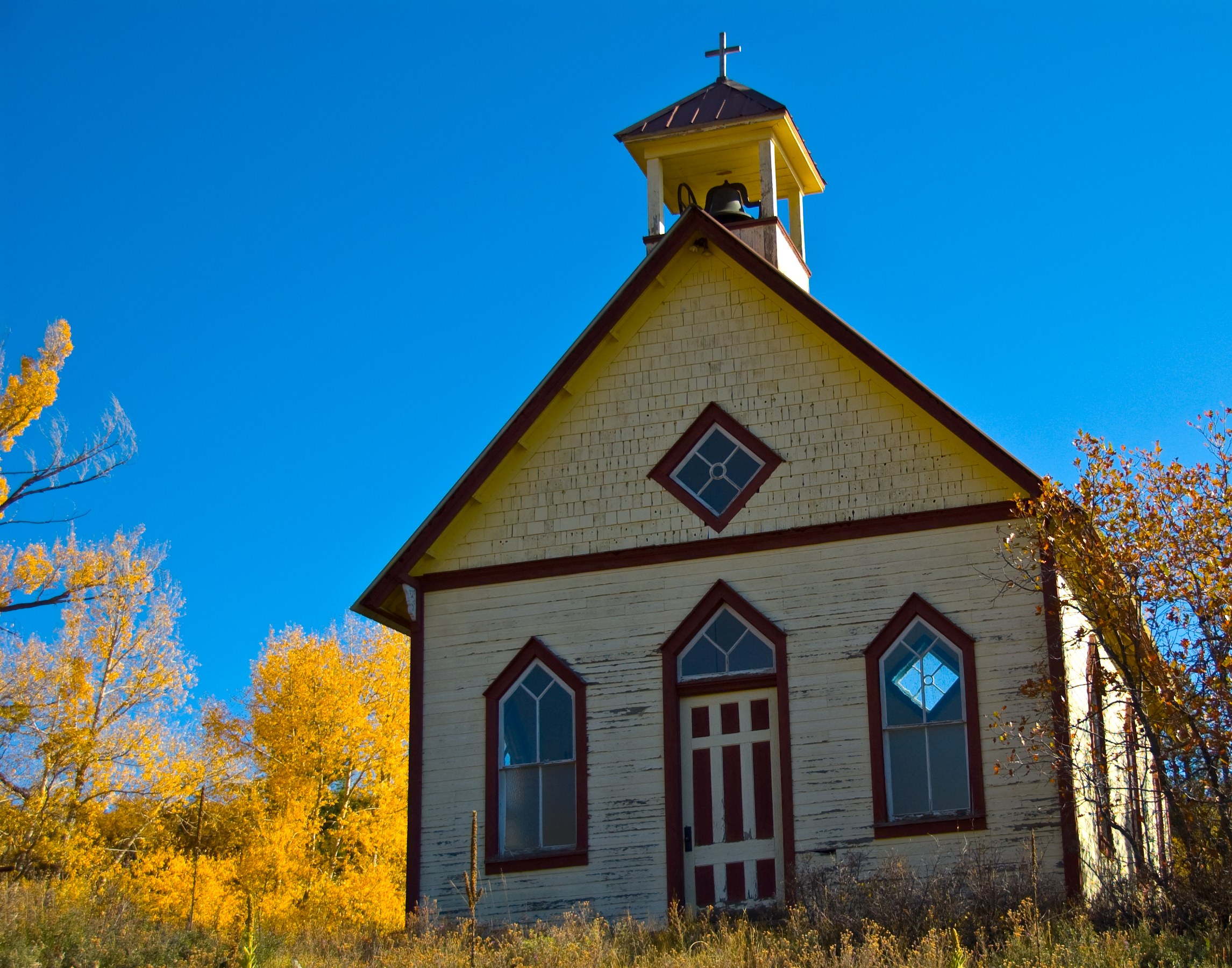
Hesperus Baptist Church

== See also ==
- Durango Micropolitan Statistical Area
- Old Spanish National Historic Trail
