= New Mexico State Road 283 =

Highway in New Mexico

State Road 283
- NM 283 highlighted in red

Route information
- Maintained by NMDOT
- Length: 13.811 mi (22.227 km)

Major junctions
- South end: Romeroville Frontage Road near Las Vegas
- North end: End of state maintenance near Blue Haven Youth Camp

Location
- Country: United States
- State: New Mexico
- Counties: San Miguel

Highway system
- New Mexico State Highway System; Interstate; US; State; Scenic
← NM 282	→ NM 284

State Road 283 (NM 283) is a 13.811-mile-long (22.227 km) state highway in the U.S. state of New Mexico. NM 283's northern terminus is at the end of state maintenance west of Las Vegas, and the southern terminus is at Romeroville Frontage Road east of I-25 and south of Las Vegas.

== Major intersections ==
The entire route is in San Miguel County.

Location	mi	km	Destinations	Notes
	0.000	0.000	Romeroville Frontage Road (FR 2137)	Southern terminus; access to I-25 exit 343 via Romeroville Frontage Rd. north
	0.025	0.040	Bridge over I-25 (US 85); no access to freeway	
	13.811	22.227	Blue Haven Youth Camp	End of state maintenance; northern terminus
1.000 mi = 1.609 km; 1.000 km = 0.621 mi
