= Farmington Historic Downtown Commercial District =

Historic district in Farmington, New Mexico, United States

- U.S. National Register of Historic Places
- U.S. Historic district
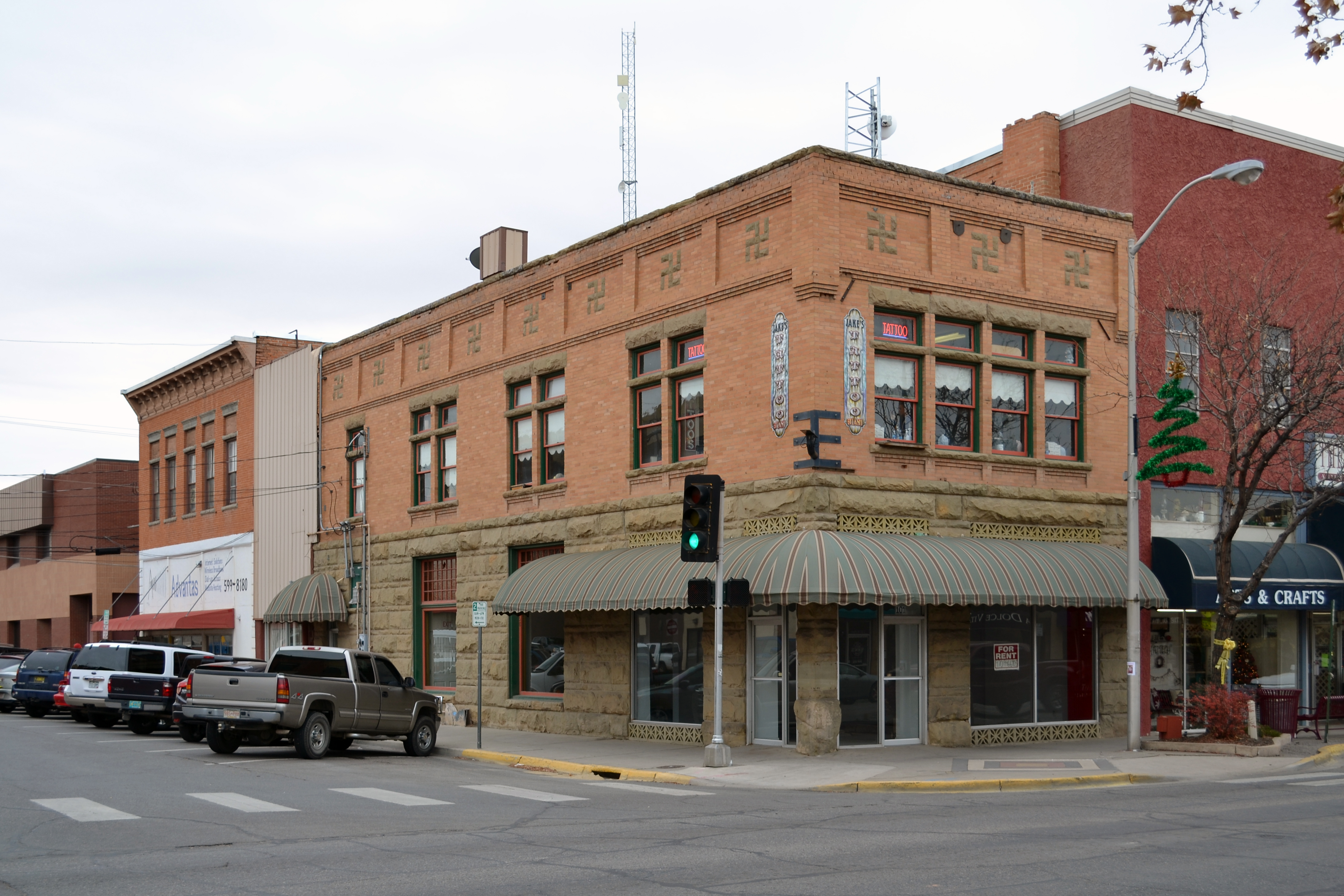
- Falling Waters building, 2018

- Location within New Mexico Location within the United States
- Location: Approximately 8 blocks, along Main Street and Broadway, from Auburn Avenue to Miller Avenue; Farmington, New Mexico; United States
- Coordinates: 36°43′43″N 108°12′22″W
- Area: 22 acres (8.9 ha)
- Architectural style: Italianate, Late 19th and 20th Century Revivals
- NRHP reference No.: 02001551
- Added to NRHP: December 20, 2002

The Farmington Historic Downtown Commercial District is a 22 acres (8.9 ha) historic district in Farmington, New Mexico, United States, that is listed on the National Register of Historic Places (NFRP).

== Description ==
The district is approximately eight blocks, along Main Street and Broadway, from Auburn Avenue to Miller Avenue It includes 62 contributing buildings and one contributing site, as well as 37 non-contributing buildings.

One of the older business block buildings is the Falling Waters building, a two-part building built in 1907 with modifications in the 1920s and 1930s.

The district was listed on the NRHP December 20, 2002.

== Notable buildings ==
| Name | Image | Location | Year built | Style | Notes |
|---|---|---|---|---|---|
| Alamo Motor Company (Star Garage) | | 122 East Main Street | 1915 | Mission Revival | |
| Andrews Building (Farmington Drug) | | 101 East Main Street | 1911 | | |
| Bowman Brothers Drugs | | 115 West Main Street | 1911 | | |
| Clinton Taylor Building | | 306 West Main Street | 1938 | | |
| Falling Waters | | 101 West Main Street | 1907 | | |
| Farmington Lumber and Hardware Company | | 302 East Main Street | 1906 | | Oldest building and only frame structure in the district |
| Harry S. Allen Building | | 208 West Main Street | 1936 | | |
| Mandarin Cafe | | 222 West Main Street | 1925 | | |
| San Juan County Bank | | 106 West Main Street | 1911 | Neoclassical Revival | |
| Taft Building | | 224–228 West Main Street | 1938 | Streamline Moderne | |
| Totah Theater | | 315 West Main Street | 1949 | | |

== See also ==
- National Register of Historic Places listings in San Juan County, New Mexico
