= Aztec Main Street Historic District =

- U.S. National Register of Historic Places
- U.S. Historic district
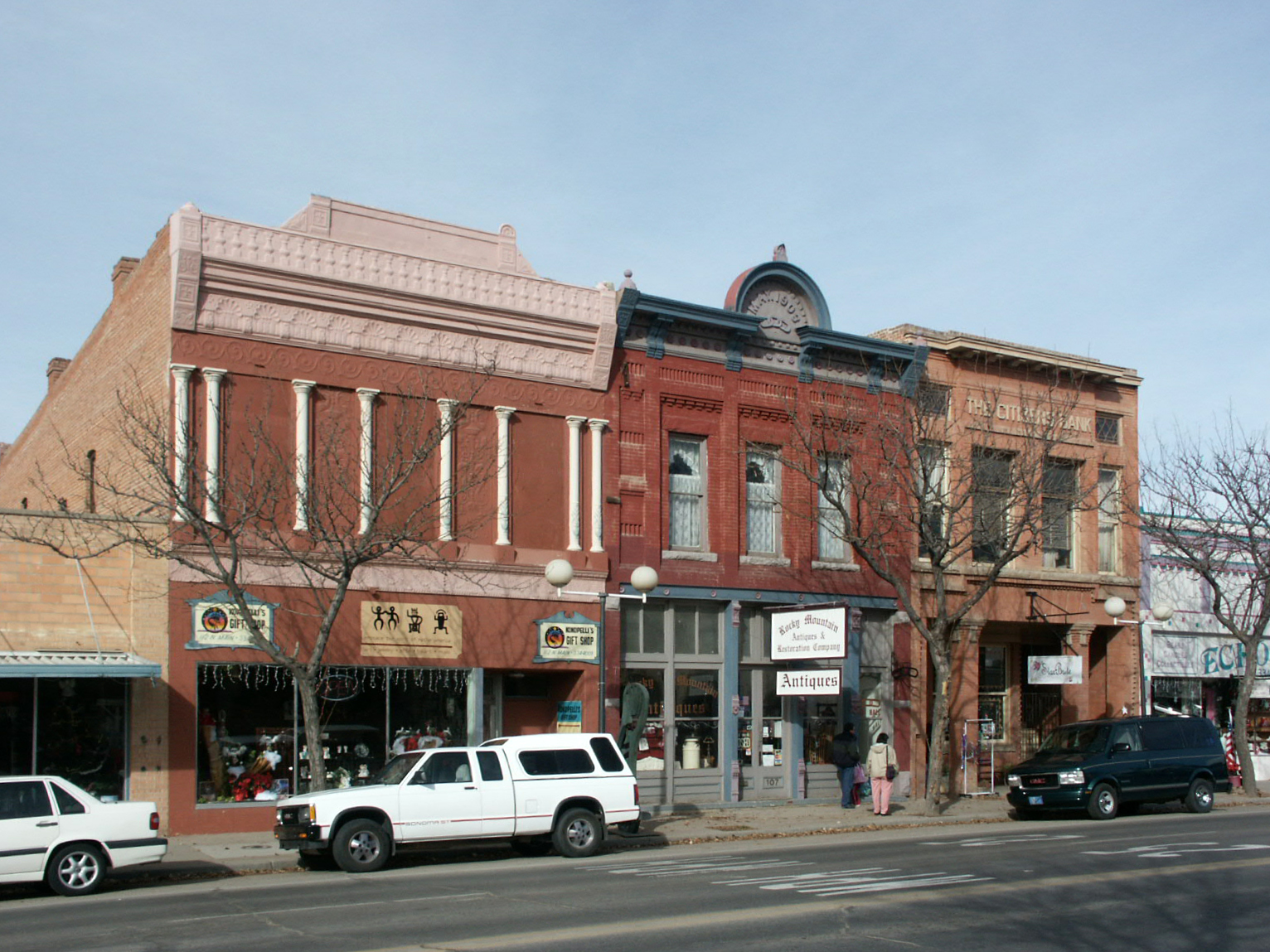
- Townsend, Odd Fellows, and Citizens Bank buildings, 2003

- Location within New Mexico Location within the United States
- Location: Bounded by Main E., Chuska S., alley between Park and Main W., and Chaco N., Aztec, New Mexico
- Coordinates: 36°49′19″N 107°59′54″W
- Area: 1.5 acres (0.61 ha)
- Built: 1900
- Architectural style: Classical Revival, Italianate, Decorative Brick Style
- MPS: Aztec New Mexico Historic MRA
- NRHP reference No.: 85000321
- Added to NRHP: February 21, 1985

The Aztec Main Street Historic District is a 1.5 acres (0.61 ha) historic district which was listed on the National Register of Historic Places in 1985. It included 11 buildings, eight of them being contributing buildings. The district is a half-block area bounded by Main E., Chuska S., alley between Park and Main W., and Chaco N.

It includes:

- J. M. Randall Building (1907), 117 S. Main, Italianate brick building
- Townsend Building (1908-1913), 111 S. Main
- Odd Fellows Lodge Building, 109 S. Main
