= New Mexico State Road 170 =

State highway in New Mexico, United States

State Road 170

Route information
- Maintained by NMDOT
- Length: 19.599 mi (31.542 km)

Major junctions
- South end: US 64 near Farmington
- North end: SH 140 at the Colorado state line near La Plata

Location
- Country: United States
- State: New Mexico
- Counties: San Juan

Highway system
- New Mexico State Highway System; Interstate; US; State; Scenic
← NM 169	→ NM 171

State Road 170 (NM 170) is a 19.599-mile-long (31.542 km) state highway in the US state of New Mexico. NM 170's southern terminus is at U.S. Route 64 (US 64) west of Farmington, and the northern terminus is a continuation as Colorado State Highway 140 (SH 140) at the New Mexico/Colorado state line.

== Major intersections ==
The entire route is in San Juan County.

Location	mi	km	Destinations	Notes
Farmington	0.000	0.000	US 64	Southern terminus
La Plata	14.592	23.484	NM 574 south	Northern terminus of NM 574
	19.599	31.542	SH 140	Northern terminus, continues north into Colorado
1.000 mi = 1.609 km; 1.000 km = 0.621 mi

== See also ==
- New Mexico Department of Transportation (NMDOT) Roadway Inventory Program
