= D.C. Ball House =

- D. C. Ball House
- U.S. National Register of Historic Places
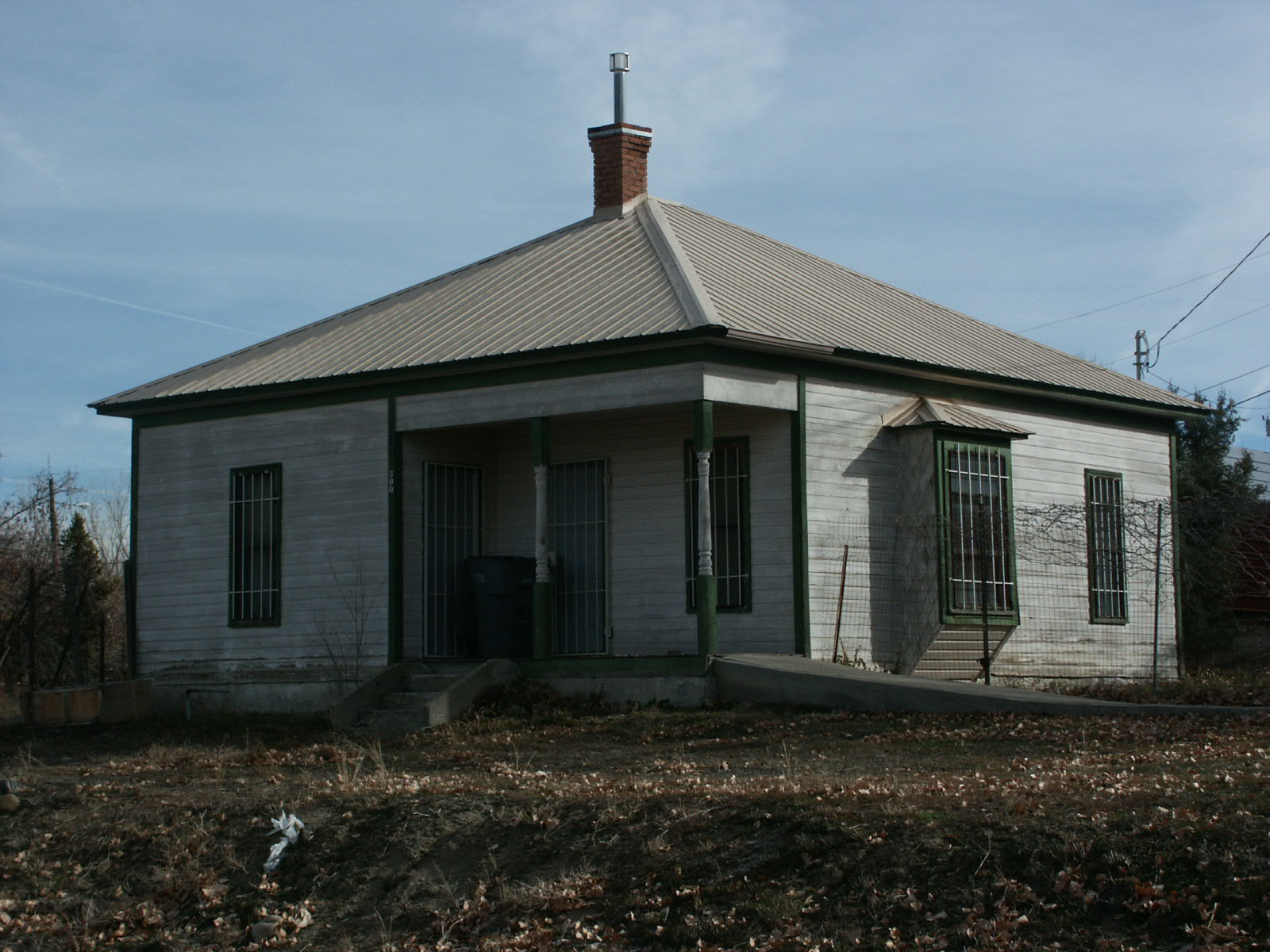

- Location within New Mexico
- Location: 300 San Juan, Aztec, New Mexico
- Coordinates: 36°49′26″N 107°59′18″W
- Area: less than one acre
- Built: 1901
- MPS: Aztec New Mexico Historic MRA
- NRHP reference No.: 85000326
- Added to NRHP: February 21, 1985

The D. C. Ball House, at 300 San Juan in Aztec, New Mexico, US, was built in 1901. It is a hipped roof cottage. It was listed on the National Register of Historic Places in 1985.

It has shiplap over frame construction, and is one of few well-preserved hipped cottages in Aztec.
