= New Mexico State Road 516 =

State highway in New Mexico, US

State Road 516

Route information
- Maintained by NMDOT
- Length: 13.719 mi (22.079 km)

Major junctions
- South end: US 64 in Farmington
- North end: US 550 in Aztec

Location
- Country: United States
- State: New Mexico
- Counties: San Juan

Highway system
- New Mexico State Highway System; Interstate; US; State; Scenic
← NM 515	→ NM 517

State Road 516 (NM 516) is a 13.719-mile-long (22.079 km) state highway in the US state of New Mexico. NM 516's southern terminus is at U.S. Route 64 (US 64) in Farmington, and the northern terminus is at US 550 in Aztec.

== Major intersections ==
The entire route is in San Juan County.

Location	mi	km	Destinations	Notes
Farmington	0.000	0.000	US 64	Southern terminus
Aztec	12.197	19.629	NM 282 north	Southern terminus of NM 282
Aztec	12.819	20.630	NM 574 north	Southern terminus of NM 574
Aztec	13.110	21.098	Ruins Road	Former southern terminus of NM 248
Aztec	13.719	22.079	US 550	Northern terminus
1.000 mi = 1.609 km; 1.000 km = 0.621 mi
