= Austin–McDonald House =

- Austin-McDonald House
- U.S. National Register of Historic Places
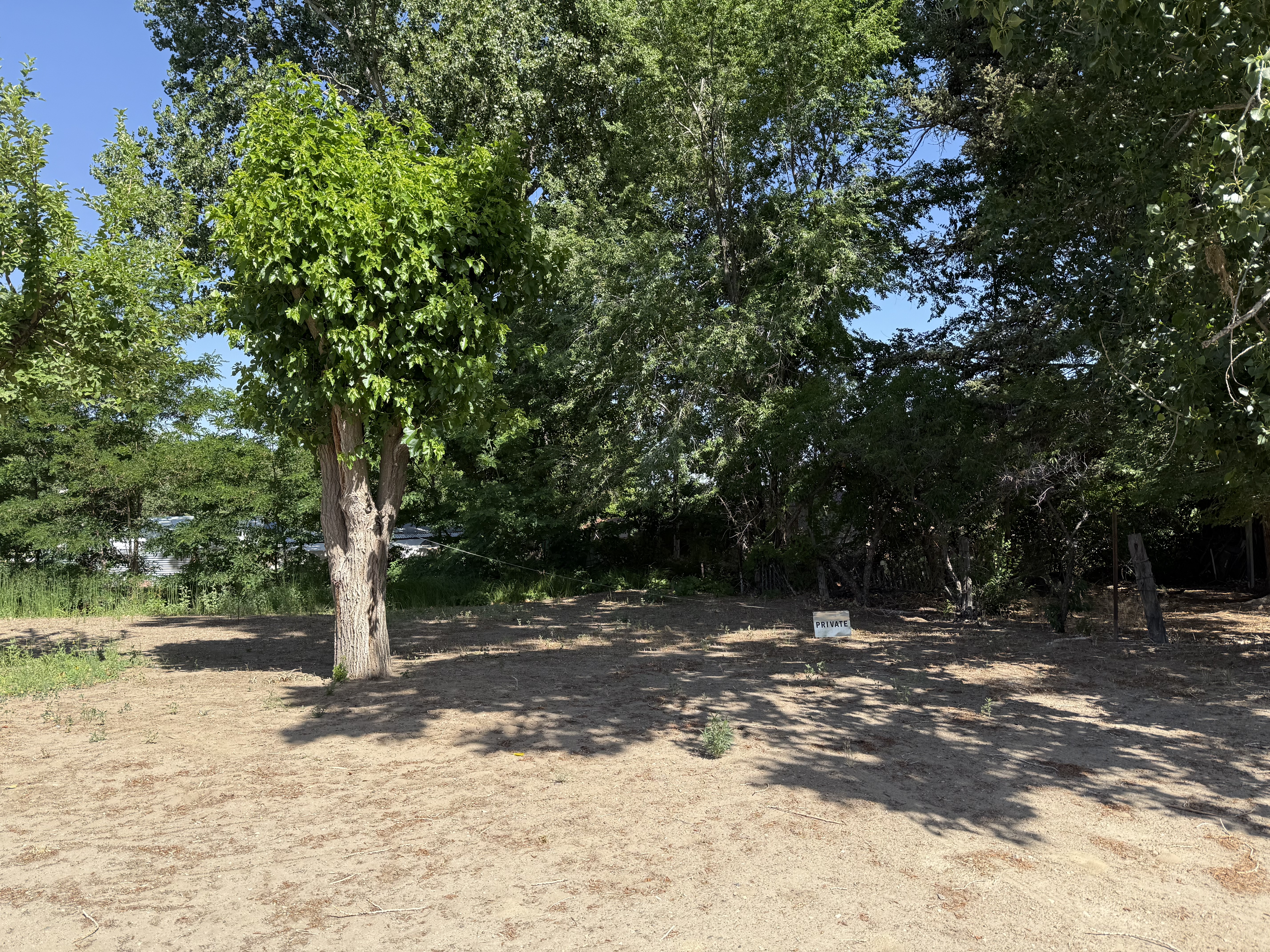
- Former location of the Austin–McDonald House

- Location within New Mexico
- Location: 501 Rio Grande, Aztec, New Mexico
- Coordinates: 36°49′33″N 107°59′27″W
- Area: less than one acre
- Built: 1910
- MPS: Aztec New Mexico Historic MRA
- NRHP reference No.: 85000324
- Added to NRHP: February 21, 1985

The Austin–McDonald House, at 501 Rio Grande in Aztec, New Mexico, was built in 1910. It was listed on the National Register of Historic Places in 1985. It had also been known as Koogler House.

It was built as a one-story four-room adobe house, and later expanded to include a wood frame second story.
