= McCoy-Maddox House =

- U.S. National Register of Historic Places
- Location within New Mexico
- Location: NW corner of Maddox and NE Aztec Blvd., Aztec, New Mexico
- Coordinates: 36°49′45″N 107°59′21″W
- Area: less than one acre
- Built: 1895
- Built by: Brown, Clarence
- Architectural style: Hipped Cottage
- MPS: Aztec New Mexico Historic MRA
- NRHP reference No.: 85000334
- Added to NRHP: February 21, 1985

The McCoy-Maddox House, on the NW corner of Maddox and NE Aztec Blvd. in Aztec, New Mexico, was built in 1895. It was listed on the National Register of Historic Places in 1985. It has also been known as Spargo House and is a hipped roof cottage. The listing included a second contributing building.

The G.W. McCoy family was the first of the early homestead families in Aztec to replace their original log cabin. The resulting brick house is the oldest and perhaps one of the best hipped cottages in Aztec. A 10 by 10 feet (3.0 m × 3.0 m) hipped roof one-story summer kitchen echoes the main house.

The family's 40 acres (16 ha) apple orchard ob its original 160 acres (65 ha) homestead is represented by a single surviving apple tree next to the house.
