= Harvey McCoy House =

- U.S. National Register of Historic Places
- Location within New Mexico
- Location: 725 Pioneer, Aztec, New Mexico
- Coordinates: 36°49′45″N 107°59′37″W
- Area: less than one acre
- Built: 1906
- MPS: Aztec New Mexico Historic MRA
- NRHP reference No.: 85000333
- Added to NRHP: February 21, 1985

The Harvey McCoy House, at 725 Pioneer in Aztec, New Mexico, was built in 1906. It was listed on the National Register of Historic Places in 1985.

It is built of brick laid in Flemish bond, and it has a hipped roof.
