= Daws-Keys House =

Historic house in New Mexico, United States

- U.S. National Register of Historic Places
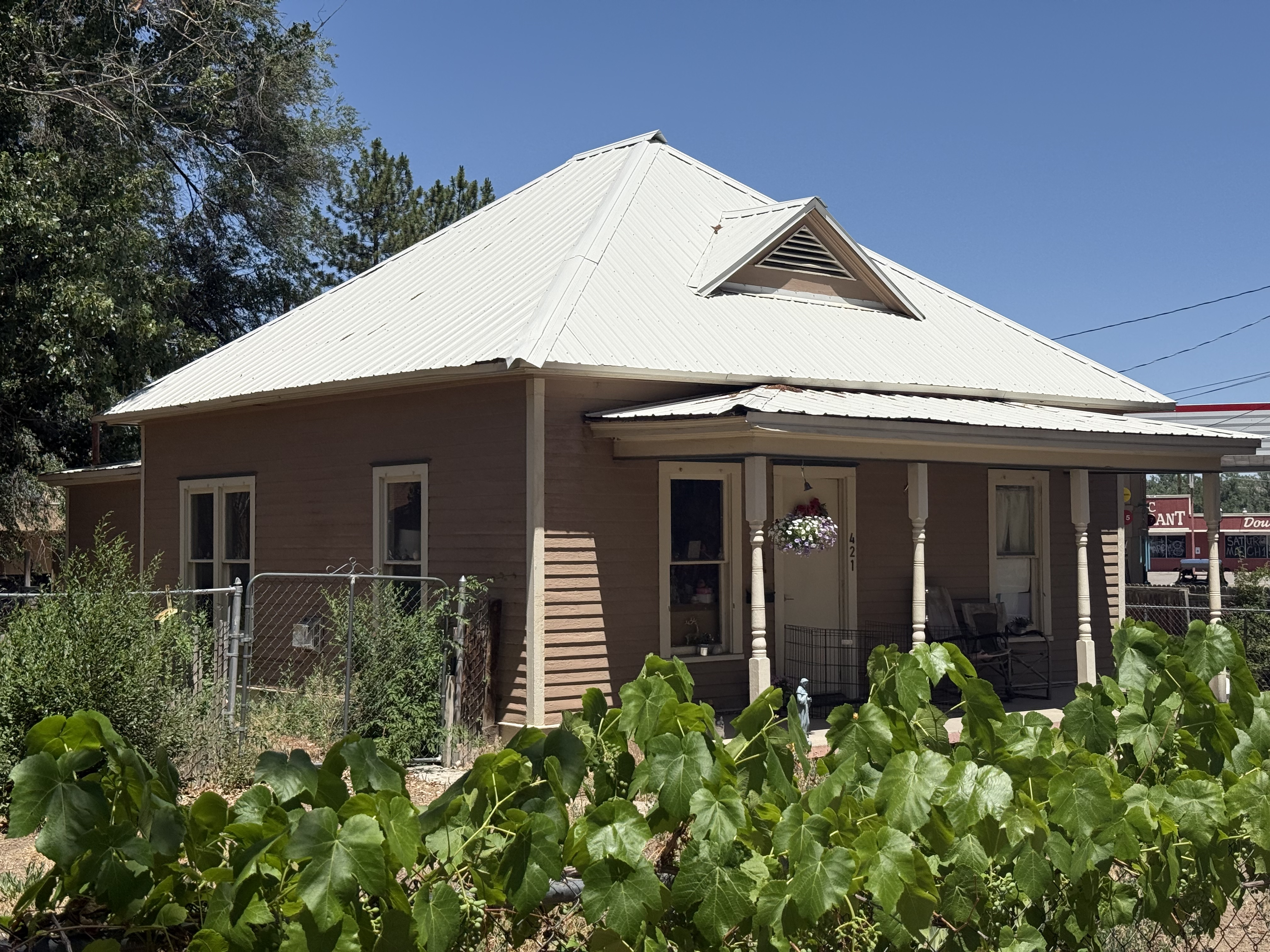

- Location within New Mexico Location within the United States
- Location: 421 N. Church, Aztec, New Mexico
- Coordinates: 36°49′32″N 107°59′44″W
- Area: less than one acre
- Architectural style: Hipped Cottage
- MPS: Aztec New Mexico Historic MRA
- NRHP reference No.: 85000330
- Added to NRHP: February 21, 1985

The Daws-Keys House in Aztec, New Mexico was listed on the National Register of Historic Places in 1985.

It is a hipped roof cottage, deemed notable as an intact "fine reminder" of its type from before the railroad reached the town.
