= Building at 202 Park Avenue =

- U.S. National Register of Historic Places
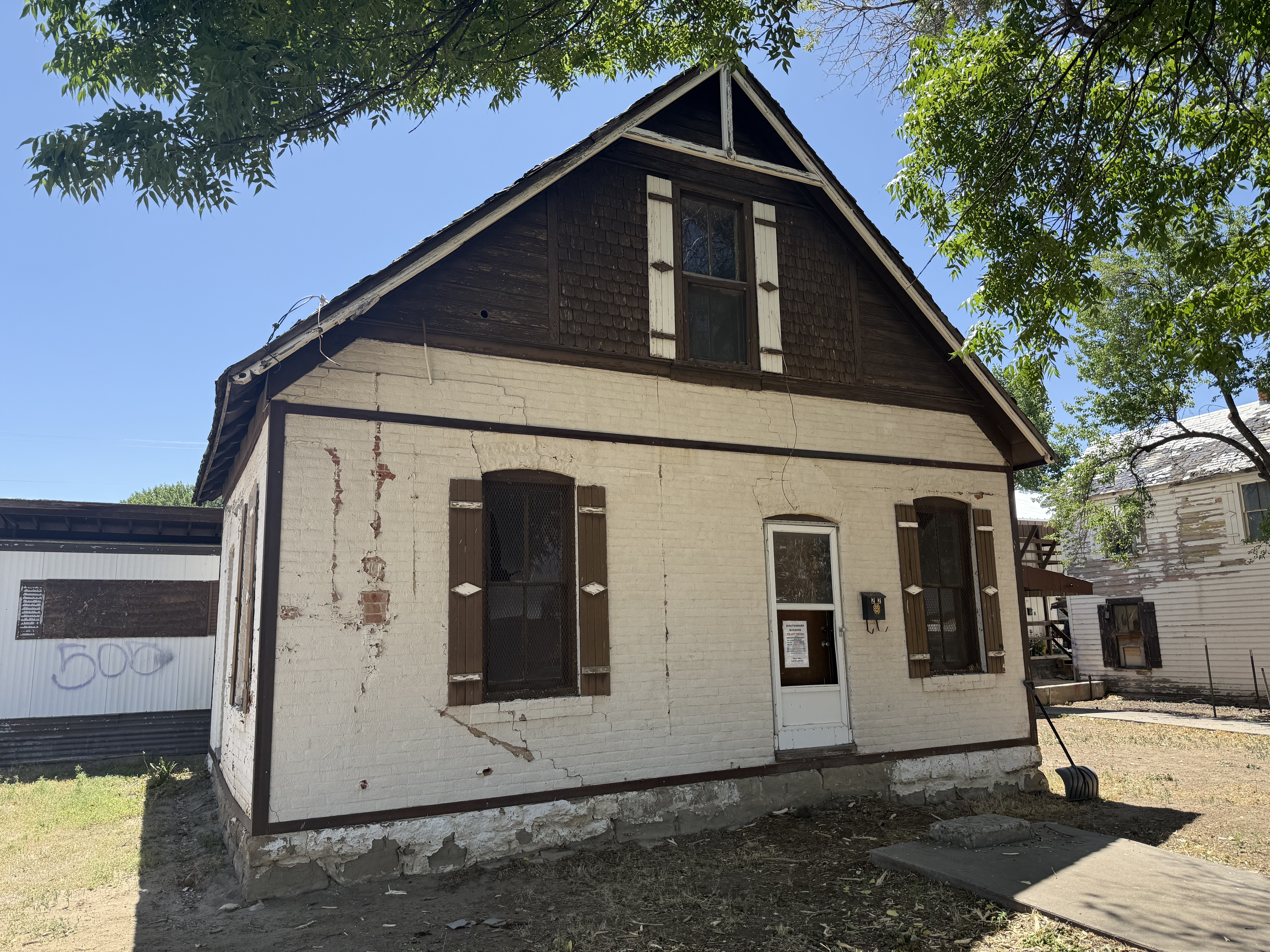

- Location within New Mexico
- Location: 202 Park Ave., Aztec, New Mexico
- Coordinates: 36°49′17″N 107°59′58″W
- Area: less than one acre
- Architectural style: Queen Anne
- MPS: Aztec New Mexico Historic MRA
- NRHP reference No.: 85000328
- Added to NRHP: February 21, 1985

The Building at 202 Park Avenue, in Aztec, New Mexico, was listed on the National Register of Historic Places in 1985.

It has brick walls and is built upon an ashlar stone foundation. It has a gable frieze board with shiplap and wood shingles above, and a cut-out and chamfered bargeboard and stickwork.

It was deemed significant in 1985 as follows: "While most of the residences built in the original town site before the arrival of the railroad stood on Church and Mesa Verde Avenues, east of the commercial area on Main Street, a few were built to the west, on Park Avenue. While most of these have been remodeled, the house at 202 Park retains its original appearance. It is a condensed version of the one-and-a-half story simplified Anne type which accounts for half a dozen houses in the proposed residential district (ill. 12). The Park Avenue house is one room deep rather than two, and shiplap is substituted for the half timbering in the gables of the larger examples. Details such as the projecting brick sills and segmental arches and the chamfered and cut-out bargeboard and stickwork, nevertheless, make it a pleasing, if modest, house."
