= McGee House (Aztec, New Mexico) =

- U.S. National Register of Historic Places
- Location within New Mexico
- Location: 501 Sabena St., Aztec, New Mexico
- Coordinates: 36°49′52″N 107°59′20″W
- Area: less than one acre
- Built: 1917
- Built by: McGee, James
- MPS: Aztec New Mexico Historic MRA
- NRHP reference No.: 85000335
- Added to NRHP: February 21, 1985

The McGee House in Aztec, New Mexico, at 501 Sabena St., was built in 1917. It was listed on the National Register of Historic Places in 1985.

It is a two-story home with a concrete first floor upon a concrete foundation, and frame above. In 1984 it was written that the house "was begun in 1917 by James McGee and occupied in 1923, but as his son, Cecil, who continues to live here today, is fond of pointing out, "we haven't finished it yet." As an owner-built house, it is an approximation of something else, in this case the T. A. Pierce Mansion erected in the Church Avenue district in 1907. The cubic massing with the hipped roof and dormer, and the two wall surfaces, light below and dark shingles above, are drawn from the model. But where the Pierce House had a clapboard first floor, the McGees substitute concrete walls which were poured in place along with the full basement. The contemplated full front porch was also sacrificed when the balustrade purchased for the purpose was adapted for the central staircase."

The listing included the house, barn, and landscaped area of the original homestead, but not the rest of the farm.
