= Building at 500 White Avenue =

- U.S. National Register of Historic Places
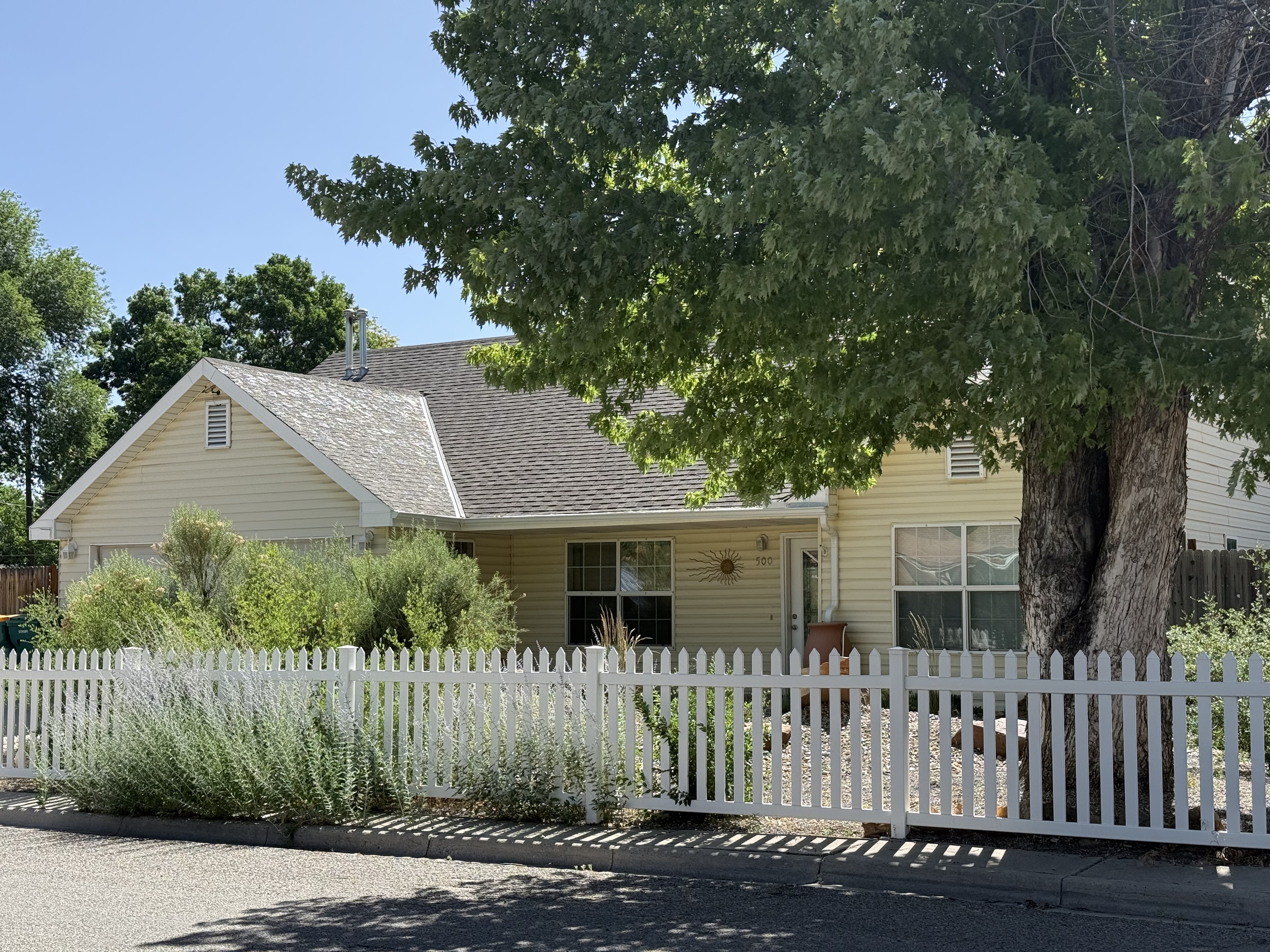
- Building that now exists at 500 White Ave.

- Location within New Mexico
- Location: 500 White Ave., Aztec, New Mexico
- Coordinates: 36°49′34″N 107°59′31″W
- Area: less than one acre
- Built: 1908
- Architectural style: Queen Anne
- MPS: Aztec New Mexico Historic MRA
- NRHP reference No.: 85000327
- Added to NRHP: February 21, 1985

The Building at 500 White Avenue, in Aztec, New Mexico, was built in 1908. It was listed on the National Register of Historic Places in 1985.

It was a clapboarded wood-frame house built upon a stone foundation. It had modest elements of Queen Anne style in its decorative wood shingles (alternating in pointed and hexagonal shapes) and its lathe-turned narrow porch columns with cutout brackets. It had a "wood shingled window bay [which] is yet another attempt to add variety and distinction with limited means."
