= Aztec Motor Company Building =

- U.S. National Register of Historic Places
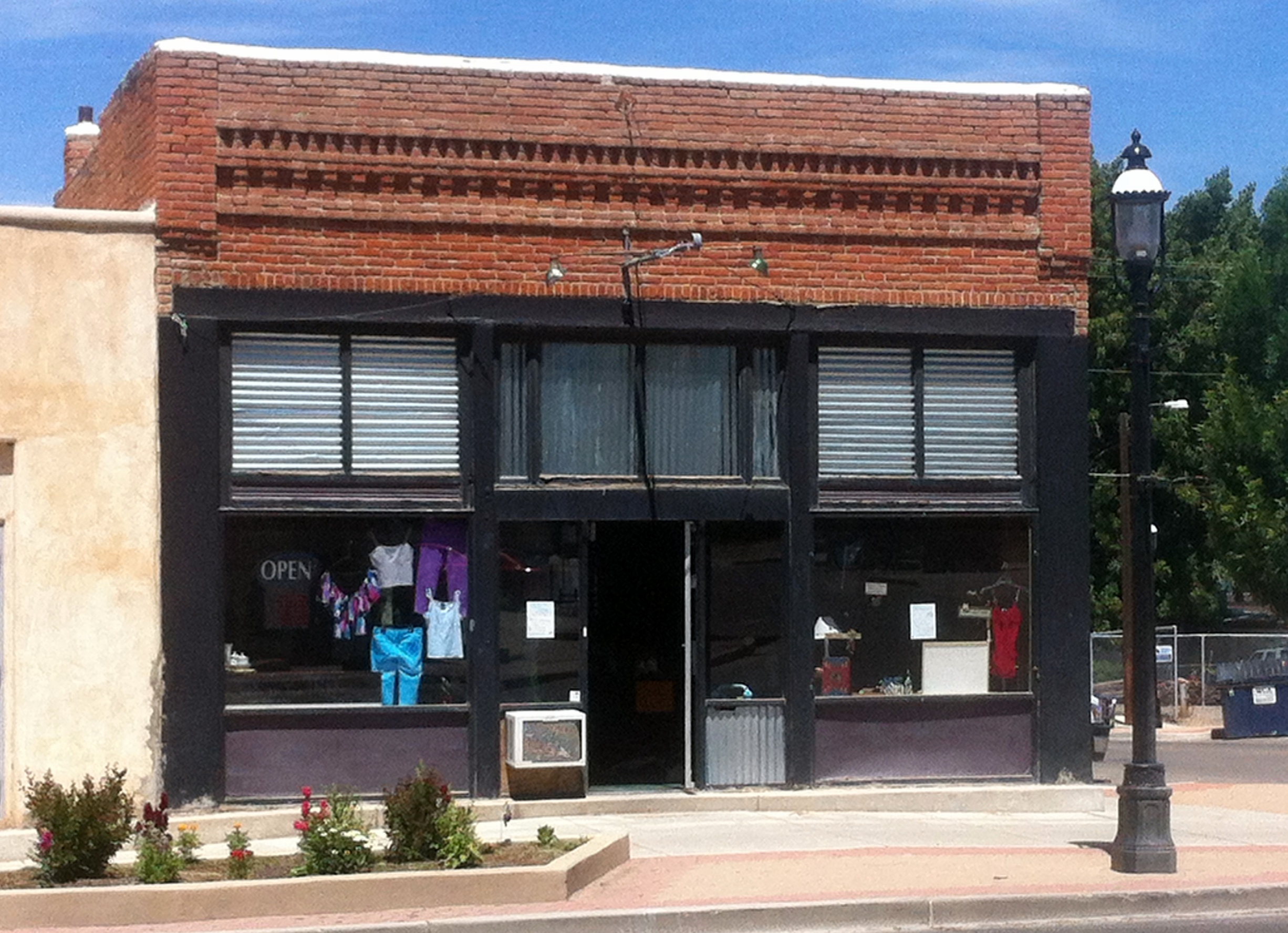

- Location within New Mexico
- Location: 301 S. Main, Aztec, New Mexico
- Coordinates: 36.82032°N 107.99623°W
- Area: less than one acre
- Built: c.1906
- Architectural style: Decorative Brick Style
- MPS: Aztec New Mexico Historic MRA
- NRHP reference No.: 85000325
- Added to NRHP: February 21, 1985

The Aztec Motor Company Building, at 301 S. Main in Aztec, New Mexico, was built around 1906. It was listed on the National Register of Historic Places in 1985.

It was built with common bond brick walls upon a stone foundation. It is the only intact one-story commercial building in business district of Aztec which was built "in the local Decorative Brick style, a type which once accounted for half a dozen buildings on Main Street. Built about 1906, it first served as a feed store, with a livery stable attached to the south. In the 1920s, as often happened, it was converted to a car dealership. Floyd Rhodes has continued to operate this Chrysler-Plymouth dealership since the 1930s."

In 1984, the building had a painted sign on its side, stating "Aztec Motor Co General Repair.", and, also on the side of the building, a projecting sign with "Aztec Motor Co."
