= Denver and Rio Grande Western Railway Depot (Aztec, New Mexico) =

- U.S. National Register of Historic Places
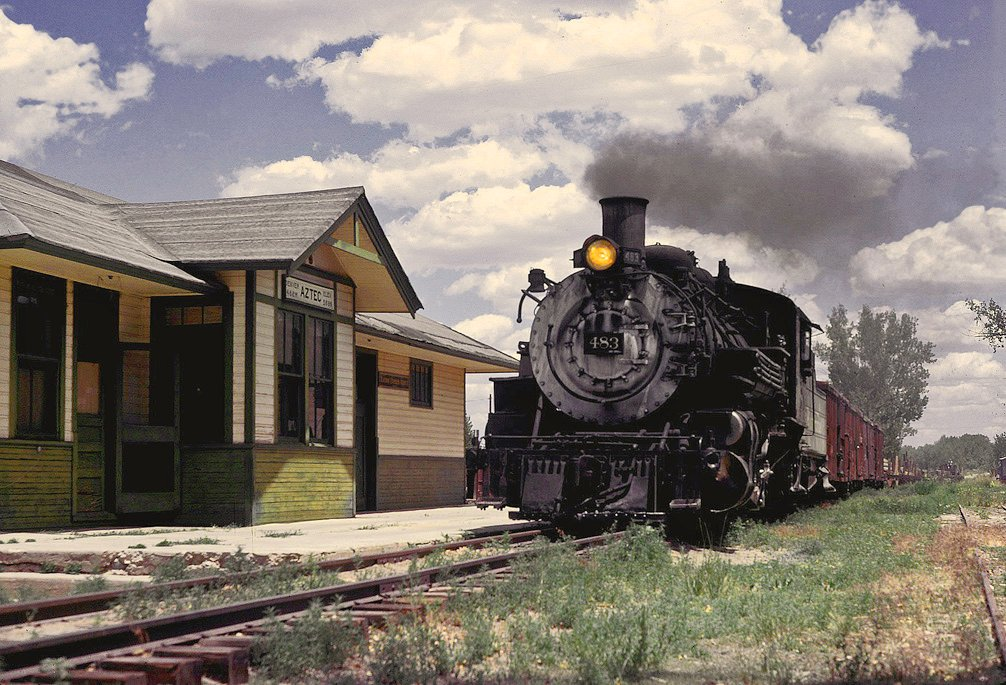
- The depot in 1967

- Location within New Mexico
- Location: 314 Rio Grande, Aztec, New Mexico
- Coordinates: 36°49′26″N 107°59′22″W
- Area: less than one acre
- Built: 1915
- Architectural style: Prairie School
- MPS: Aztec New Mexico Historic MRA
- NRHP reference No.: 85000331
- Added to NRHP: February 21, 1985

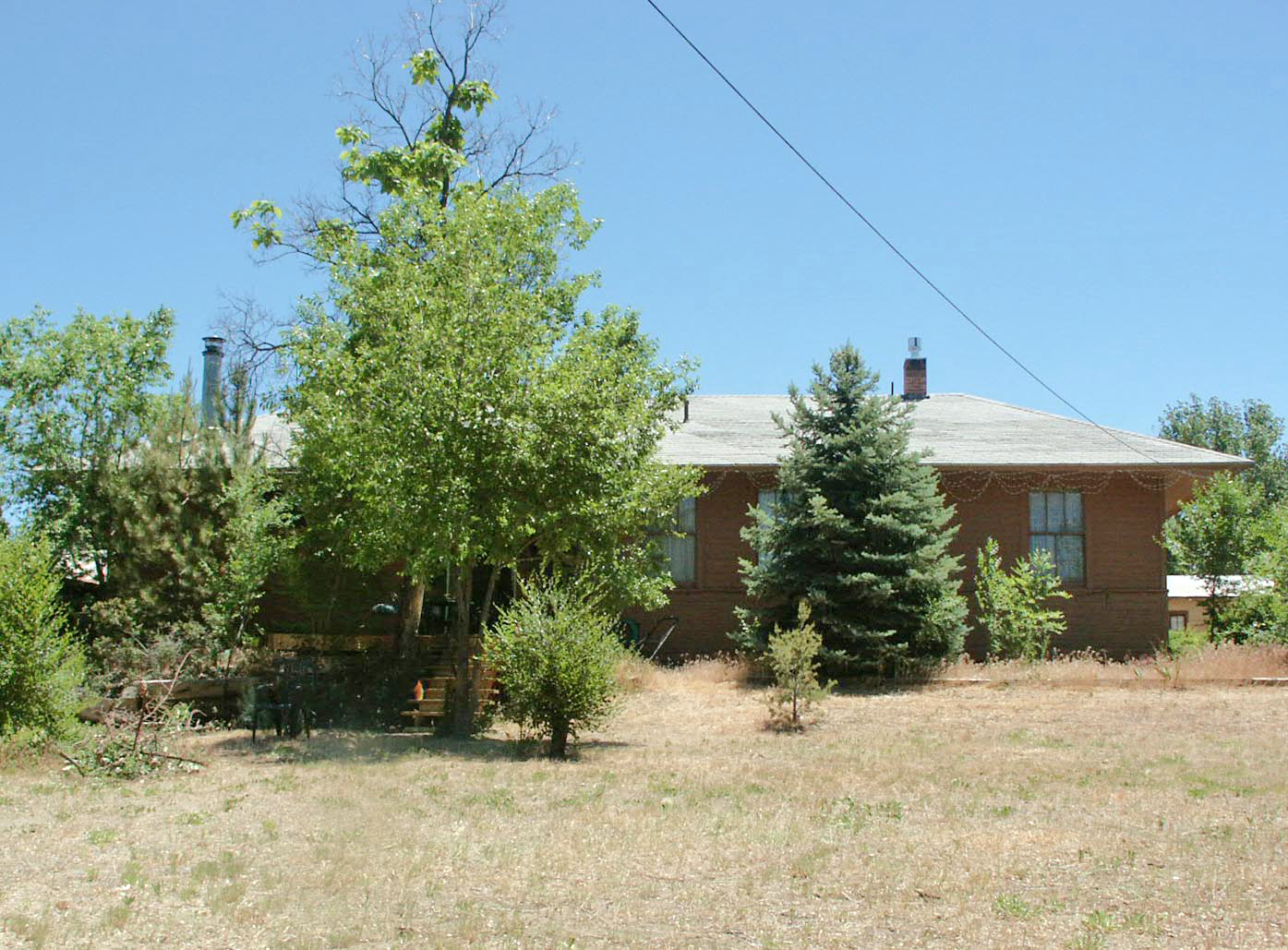
The former depot in 2004

The Denver and Rio Grande Western Railway Depot in Aztec, New Mexico, is located at 314 Rio Grande. It was built in 1915 in Prairie School style. It was listed on the National Register of Historic Places in 1985.

Railroad tracks were removed in 1968, and by 1985 the former depot was a residence. It has gable stickwork in "the Stick Style which was so popular for early western train stations" and broad enclosed eaves perhaps suggestive of Prairie Style influence. The original concrete passenger pad serves as a patio.
