= American Hotel (Aztec, New Mexico) =

- U.S. National Register of Historic Places
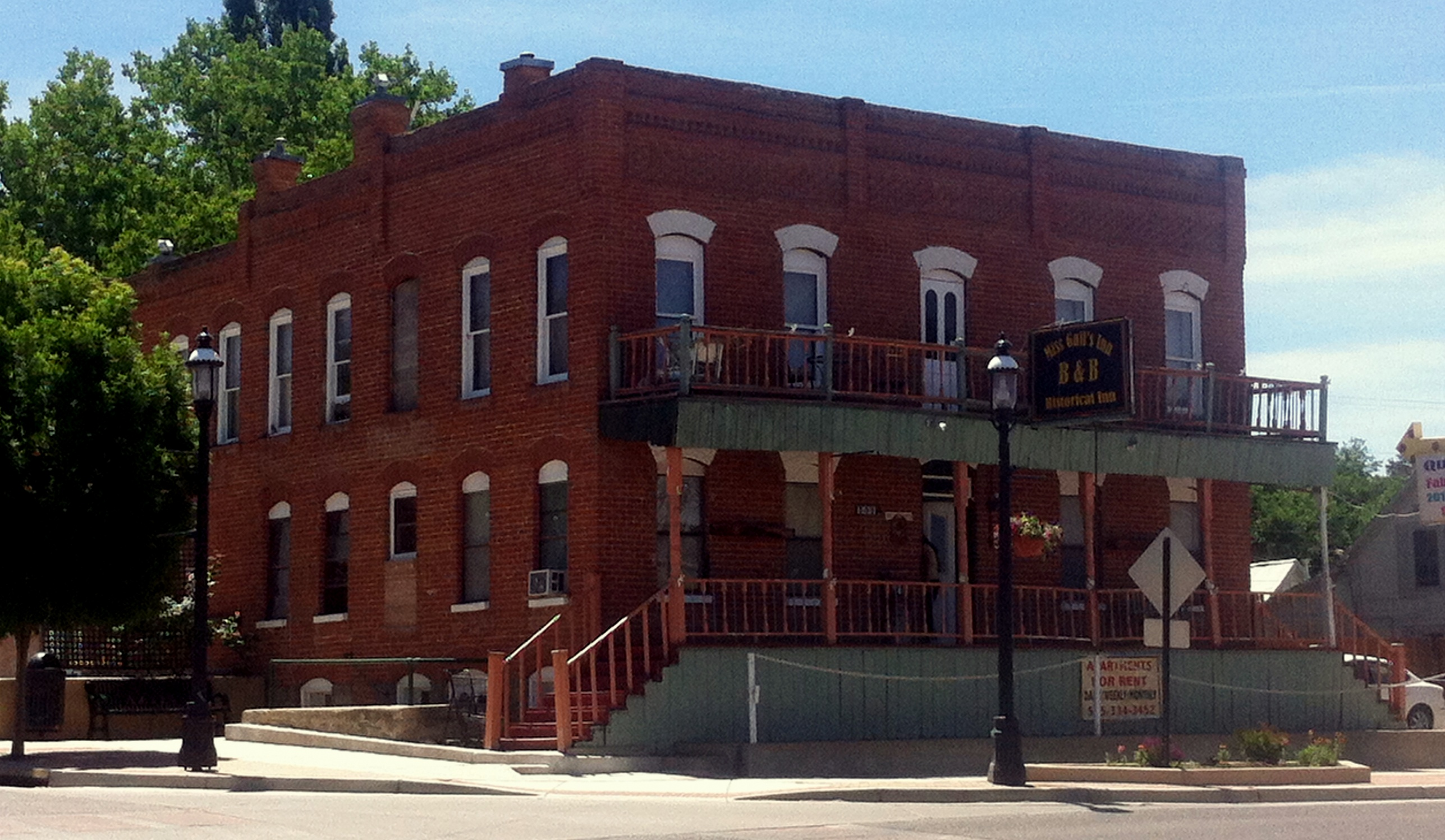

- Location within New Mexico Location within the United States
- Location: 300 S. Main, Aztec, New Mexico
- Coordinates: 36°49′07″N 107°59′55″W
- Area: less than one acre
- Built: 1906-07
- Architectural style: Decorative Brick Style
- MPS: Aztec New Mexico Historic MRA
- NRHP reference No.: 85000323
- Added to NRHP: February 21, 1985

The American Hotel in Aztec, New Mexico, later known as the Aztec Residential Hotel, was built during 1906–1907. Located at 300 S. Main, it was listed on the National Register of Historic Places in 1985.

It is a brick building with brick laid in Flemish bond and common bond. It was refurbished in 1981, including reopening bricked-in second floor windows and constructing a porch.

It later operated as Miss Gail's Inn, then converted to rental units.
