= American Hotel (Detroit) =

Building

Coordinates: 42°20′30.9″N 83°3′32.9″W

The American Hotel is a former hotel in Detroit, Michigan, that was built in 1926, located on Temple Street and Cass Avenue, located beside the Detroit Masonic Temple and was originally named the Fort Wayne Hotel. The structure is 11 stories high with 300+ rooms and has been vacant since the early 1990s.
