= Church Avenue-Lovers Lane Historic District =

Historic district in New Mexico, United States

- U.S. National Register of Historic Places
- U.S. Historic district
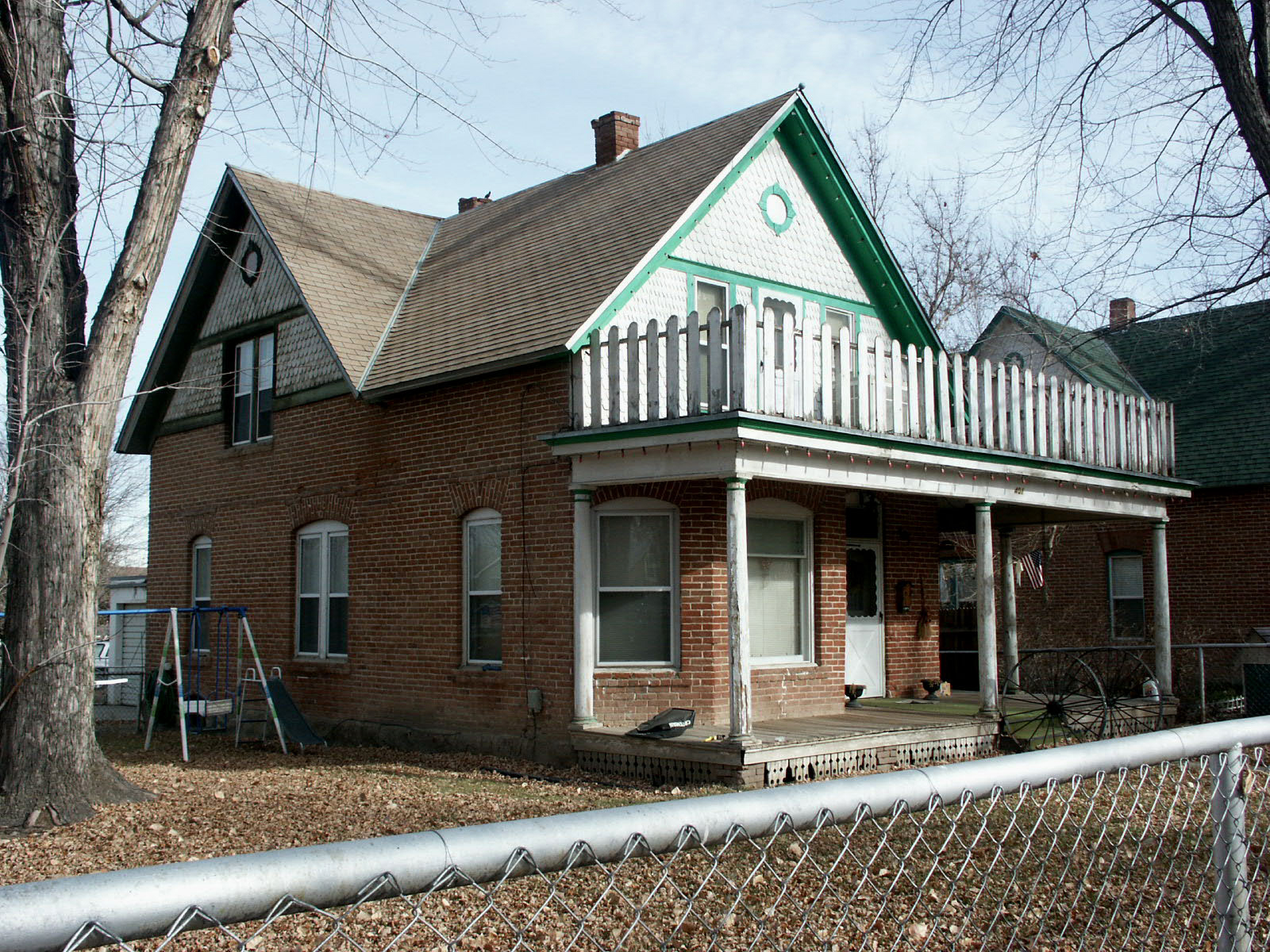
- Sherman House, 2003

- Location within New Mexico
- Location: Bounded by Rio Grande E., Zia S., Park W. and NM hwy 550, Aztec, New Mexico
- Coordinates: 36°49′22″N 107°59′41″W
- Area: 16 acres (6.5 ha)
- Architectural style: Bungalow/craftsman, Queen Anne, Free Classic
- MPS: Aztec New Mexico Historic MRA
- NRHP reference No.: 85000329
- Added to NRHP: February 21, 1985

The Church Avenue-Lovers Lane Historic District in Aztec, New Mexico was listed on the National Register of Historic Places in 1985. It is a 16 acres (6.5 ha) mainly residential historic district bounded by Rio Grande E., Zia S., Park W. and New Mexico Highway 550. The listing included 38 contributing buildings and a contributing structure.

It includes the Methodist Episcopal (now United Methodist) Church, at the NW corner of Chaco Street and Church Avenue, a Gothic Revival church built in 1906, expanded to the rear in 1928; "stucco over brick; ogee stained-glass windows; cut-out bargeboard; bracketed cornice and cut-out belfry in tower. Only remaining brick civic building from first decade of the century; those demolished include the courthouse, grade school, high school and Baptist church."

The design of the T. A. Pierce Mansion (1907) in the district was approximately copied later in construction of the McGee House (1917), at 501 Sabena St., separately listed on the National Register also in 1985. It is a two-story home with a concrete first floor upon a concrete foundation, and frame above. In 1984 it was written that the house "was begun in 1917 by James McGee and occupied in 1923, but as his son, Cecil, who continues to live here today, is fond of pointing out, "we haven't finished it yet." As an owner-built house, it is an approximation of something else, in this case the T.A. Pierce Mansion erected in the Church Avenue district in 1907. The cubic massing with the hipped roof and dormer, and the two wall surfaces, light below and dark shingles above, are drawn from the model. But where the Pierce House had a clapboard first floor, the McGees substitute concrete walls which were poured in place along with the full basement. The contemplated full front porch was also sacrificed when the balustrade purchased for the purpose was adapted for the central staircase."
