= Aztec Municipal Airport =

Aztec Airport
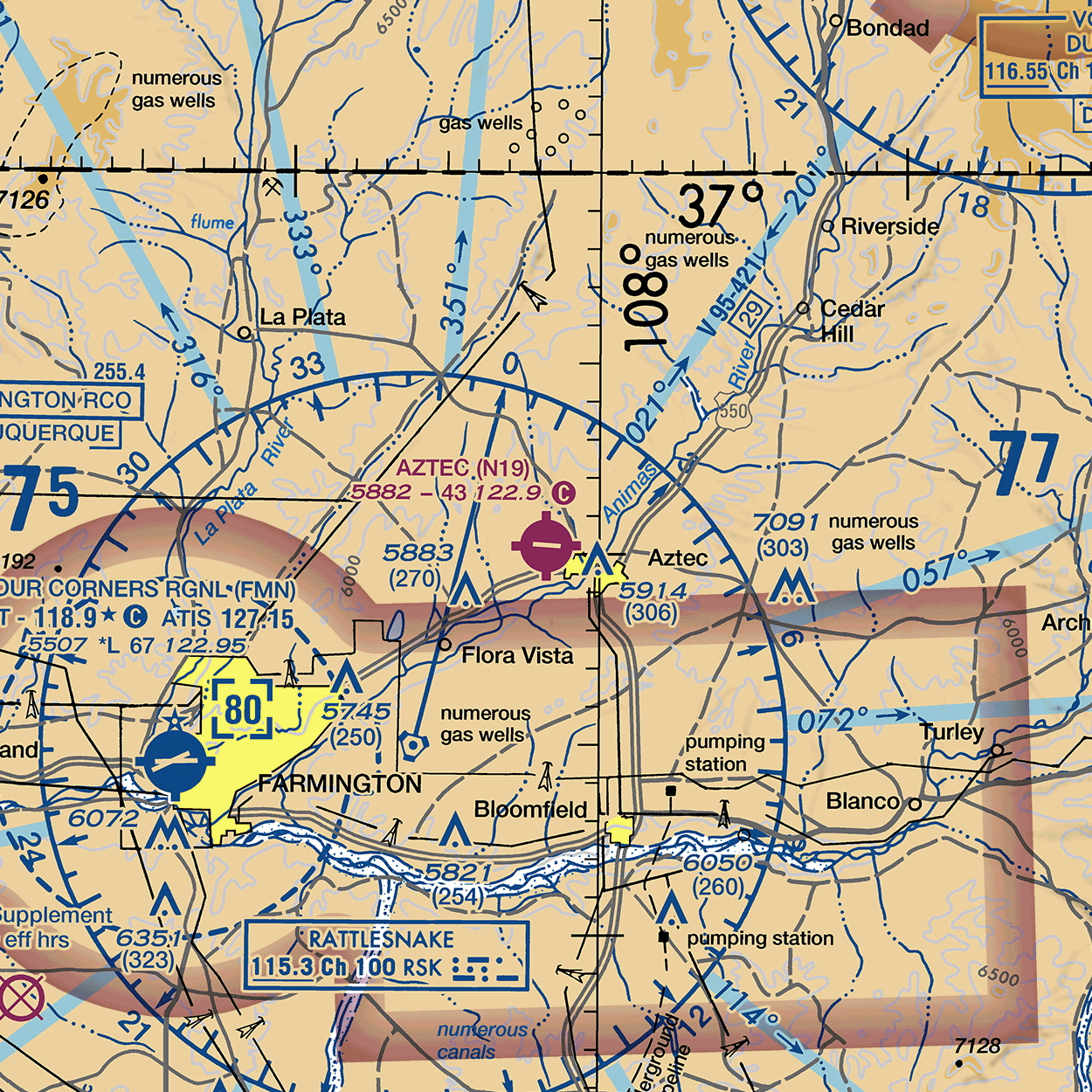
- IATA: none; ICAO: none; FAA LID: N19

Summary
- Airport type: Public
- Owner: City of Aztec
- Serves: Aztec, NM
- Elevation AMSL: 5,882 ft / 1,793 m
- Coordinates: 36.835929673532°N 108.02864936088048°W
- Website: http://www.aztecnm.gov/airport/index.html

Map
- Aztec, NM

Runways
Direction	Length		Surface
Direction	ft	m	Surface
08/26	4,314	1,315	Asphalt

Statistics (2019)
- Aircraft operations: 5500
- Source: Federal Aviation Administration

Aztec Municipal Airport (FAA LID/IATA: N19) is a public-use airport located two nautical miles (2 mi, 3.2 km) northwest of the central business district of Aztec, in San Juan County, New Mexico, United States. It is a general aviation airport with no tower, fixed base operator (FBO), or commercial services, but which is popular among smaller light sport and general aviation aircraft doing cross country flights, where the airport serves as a GA-friendly waypoint, refueling stop, and overnight layover stop.

== Facilities and aircraft ==
Aztec Airport covers an area of 160 acres (65 ha) at an elevation of 5,882 feet (1,783 m) above mean sea level. It has one runway designated 08/26 with an asphalt surface measuring 4,314 by 60 feet (1,315 x 18 m). For the 12-month period ending April 15, 2019, the airport had an average of 105 aircraft operations per week: 55% transient and 45% local general aviation.

The airport provides an unattended pilot lounge with seating, restrooms, and free WiFi. Notably, the airport also provides two vehicles that can be used by visiting pilots for free on a first-come-first-serve basis, limited to day or overnight use and travel in the immediate vicinity.

The airport operates in Class G airspace, and Class E above it begins at 1200 feet AGL. Because of this, it has become especially popular for 'non-traditional' flying and aircraft, including fixed wing, weight shift, powered parachutes (PPC), powered paragliders (PPG), hang gliders, and even limited radio control and UAV usage. The use of a two-way aviation band radio is not required, but strongly recommended for all pilots and other operators.

== Notable features ==
In 2023 the airport installed lighting for enhanced evening operations; 39 medium intensity runway lights are installed along the runway, as well as a 36 inch lighted wind sock. Traditional white beacon lights are located for runway line up and end-of-runway designations, as well as a pulsating light visual approach slope indicator (PLASI) system. The lights and PLASI system are remotely activated by using an aircraft radio and clicking 5 times in 5 seconds on the 122.9 MHz (MULTICOM) frequency.

Aztec does not have an FAA-certified automated airport weather station; however, it does maintain a privately operated Tempest Weather System that provides continuous weather information available from the Internet.

== History ==
=== Facilities ===
On January 9, 1961, a 20-year lease from the BLM for approximately 157 acres was acquired, which established the original runway area; land adjacent to the lease, such as where the hangars and terminal now exist, were also purchased by the City in 1961 for $8,900. The lease was renewed again in 1981.

In 2001, the lease was reduced to 11 acres. At the time, the airport manager and other city staff stated that the reduction in the lease size was for financial reasons, believing the larger lease area was too costly. The new lease effectively reduced the airport’s leased area solely to the perimeters of the two existing runways and a portion of the aircraft apron.

During 2009 and 2010, the primary runway (8/26) was re-constructed.

In 2017 the crosswind runway was closed due to a failure to meet several minimum requirements established by the FAA. It was determined that significant changes to the airport - including the relocation of buildings - would be required to keep the runway open.

=== Management ===
In 1988, Mike Arnold Sr. became the airport General Manager, and took up residence with his family on the airport grounds in 1999. He served as general manager until 2013.

In 1996, a set of rules and regulations were prepared and adopted. Titled “Handbook of Airport Operations”, they applied to all airport tenants to ensure the safe and efficient operation of the airport. With no commercial services conducted at the Airport, the City has never developed a set of minimum standards.

On May 18, 2013, Mr. Arnold was involved in a single-person fatality in his personal Peck P-1 airplane, which was destroyed after it impacted the ground during takeoff. The root cause of the crash could not be specifically determined.

The airport’s management lease continued to be fulfilled by the decedent’s family until September 2014, when the City of Aztec purchased Mr. Arnold’s home at the airport and began managing and maintaining the facility directly.
