= Aztec Ruins National Monument =

US national monument in New Mexico

- IUCN category III (natural monument or feature)
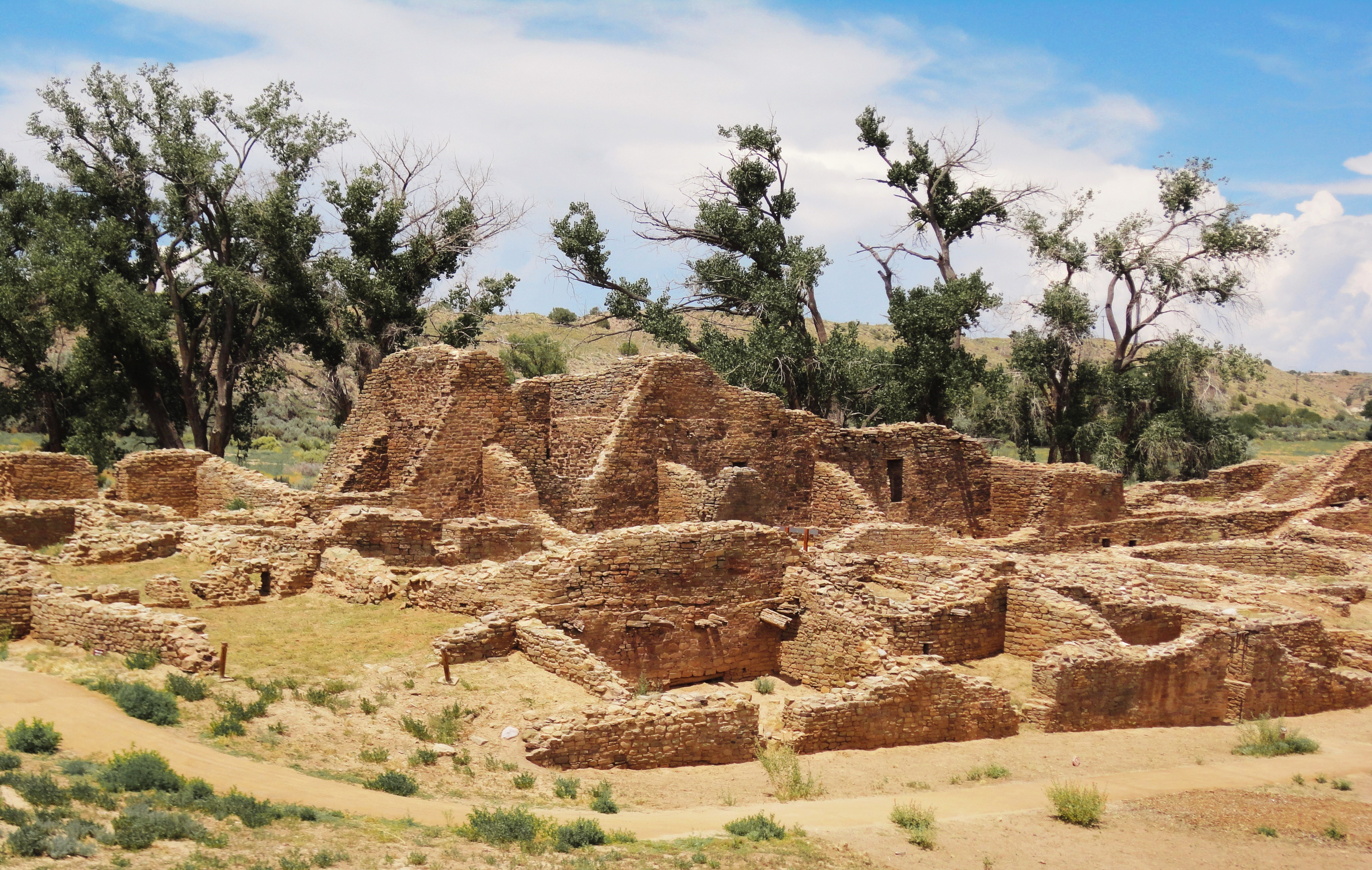

- Location within New Mexico Location within the United States
- Interactive map of Aztec Ruins National Monument
- Location: San Juan County, New Mexico, U.S.
- Nearest city: Aztec
- Coordinates: 36°50′09″N 107°59′53″W
- Area: 318 acres (129 ha)
- Created: January 24, 1923
- Visitors: 38,636 (in 2025)
- Governing body: National Park Service
- Website: Aztec Ruins National Monument

UNESCO World Heritage Site
- Part of: Chaco Culture

U.S. National Register of Historic Places
- Type: U.S. historic district
- Designated: October 18, 1966
- Reference no.: 66000484

NM State Register of Cultural Properties
- Designated: May 21, 1971
- Reference no.: 55

The Aztec Ruins National Monument in northwestern New Mexico, United States, consists of preserved structures constructed by the Pueblo Indians. The national monument lies on the western bank of the Animas River in Aztec, New Mexico, about 12 miles (19 km) northeast of Farmington. Additional Puebloan structures can be found in Salmon Ruins and Heritage Park, 9.5 miles (15.3 km) south. Archaeological evidence puts the construction of the ruins in the 12th and 13th centuries. The Puebloan-built ruins were dubbed the "Aztec Ruins" by 19th- century American settlers, who misattributed their construction to the Aztecs, an indigenous people historically based in central Mexico.

The site was declared "Aztec Ruin National Monument" on January 24, 1923. "Ruin" was changed to "Ruins" after a boundary change, on July 2, 1928. As a historical property of the National Park Service, the monument was administratively listed on the National Register of Historic Places on October 15, 1966. The United Nations Educational, Scientific and Cultural Organization (UNESCO) listed the Chaco Culture as a World Heritage Site on December 8, 1987. That listing specifically included the Aztec Ruins.

The monument is on the Trail of the Ancients Scenic Byway, one of New Mexico's Scenic Byways.

The property was part of a 160-acre (65 ha) homestead owned by H.D. Abrams, who supported the preservation of the ruins. The H.D. Abrams House in Aztec is listed on the National Register of Historic Places.

== Hubbard Site ==
Hubbard Site is an Ancestral Puebloan archeological site located within the monument. The tri-wall structure, which resembles a similar building found at Pueblo del Arroyo, was excavated in 1953.

== Climate ==
The climate of Aztec Ruins National Monument is a typical semi-arid climate (Köppen: BSk).

Climate data for Aztec Ruins National Monument (1991–2020 normals, (Note: Mean monthly maxima and minima (i.e. the highest and lowest temperature readings during an entire month or year) calculated based on data at said location from 1991 to 2020.) extremes 1895–present)
Month	Jan	Feb	Mar	Apr	May	Jun	Jul	Aug	Sep	Oct	Nov	Dec	Year
Record high °F (°C)	69 (21)	78 (26)	89 (32)	89 (32)	98 (37)	105 (41)	106 (41)	105 (41)	101 (38)	92 (33)	77 (25)	69 (21)	106 (41)
Mean maximum °F (°C)	56.3 (13.5)	62.7 (17.1)	73.3 (22.9)	80.7 (27.1)	89.2 (31.8)	96.8 (36.0)	99.1 (37.3)	95.8 (35.4)	90.7 (32.6)	81.8 (27.7)	68.7 (20.4)	57.2 (14.0)	99.5 (37.5)
Mean daily maximum °F (°C)	46.0 (7.8)	52.5 (11.4)	62.8 (17.1)	70.6 (21.4)	79.8 (26.6)	90.3 (32.4)	93.9 (34.4)	91.2 (32.9)	84.2 (29.0)	71.7 (22.1)	57.7 (14.3)	46.4 (8.0)	70.6 (21.4)
Daily mean °F (°C)	31.6 (−0.2)	37.0 (2.8)	44.9 (7.2)	51.7 (10.9)	60.4 (15.8)	70.0 (21.1)	76.1 (24.5)	74.0 (23.3)	66.3 (19.1)	53.7 (12.1)	41.5 (5.3)	32.1 (0.1)	53.3 (11.8)
Mean daily minimum °F (°C)	17.1 (−8.3)	21.5 (−5.8)	27.0 (−2.8)	32.7 (0.4)	41.0 (5.0)	49.7 (9.8)	58.2 (14.6)	56.9 (13.8)	48.5 (9.2)	35.7 (2.1)	25.3 (−3.7)	17.8 (−7.9)	35.9 (2.2)
Mean minimum °F (°C)	2.8 (−16.2)	8.1 (−13.3)	14.1 (−9.9)	19.9 (−6.7)	29.7 (−1.3)	38.2 (3.4)	48.6 (9.2)	49.5 (9.7)	35.1 (1.7)	21.6 (−5.8)	11.7 (−11.3)	3.2 (−16.0)	−0.8 (−18.2)
Record low °F (°C)	−26 (−32)	−27 (−33)	−3 (−19)	2 (−17)	12 (−11)	24 (−4)	39 (4)	36 (2)	22 (−6)	6 (−14)	−7 (−22)	−24 (−31)	−27 (−33)
Average precipitation inches (mm)	0.90 (23)	0.75 (19)	0.77 (20)	0.69 (18)	0.71 (18)	0.28 (7.1)	0.96 (24)	1.32 (34)	1.13 (29)	0.94 (24)	0.94 (24)	0.67 (17)	10.06 (256)
Average snowfall inches (cm)	4.5 (11)	2.3 (5.8)	0.5 (1.3)	0.2 (0.51)	0.0 (0.0)	0.0 (0.0)	0.0 (0.0)	0.0 (0.0)	0.0 (0.0)	0.3 (0.76)	0.9 (2.3)	2.2 (5.6)	10.9 (28)
Average precipitation days (≥ 0.01 inch)	5.6	5.1	4.4	3.7	3.8	2.1	5.1	7.0	5.7	4.7	4.2	5.1	56.5
Average snowy days (≥ 0.1 inch)	2.3	1.7	0.5	0.2	0.0	0.0	0.0	0.0	0.0	0.2	0.7	1.7	7.3
Source: NOAA

== Gallery ==
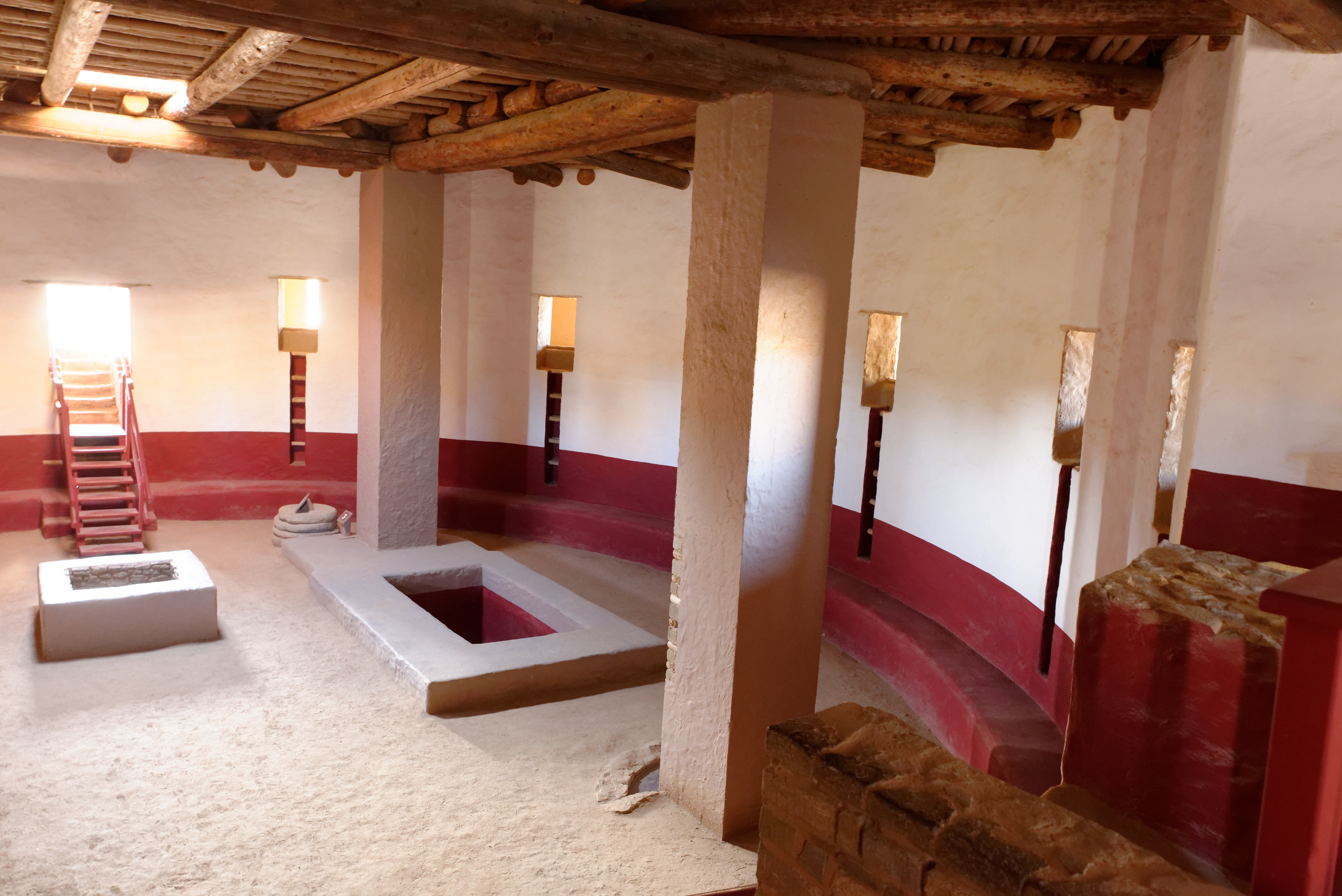
The restored Great Kiva at Aztec Ruins

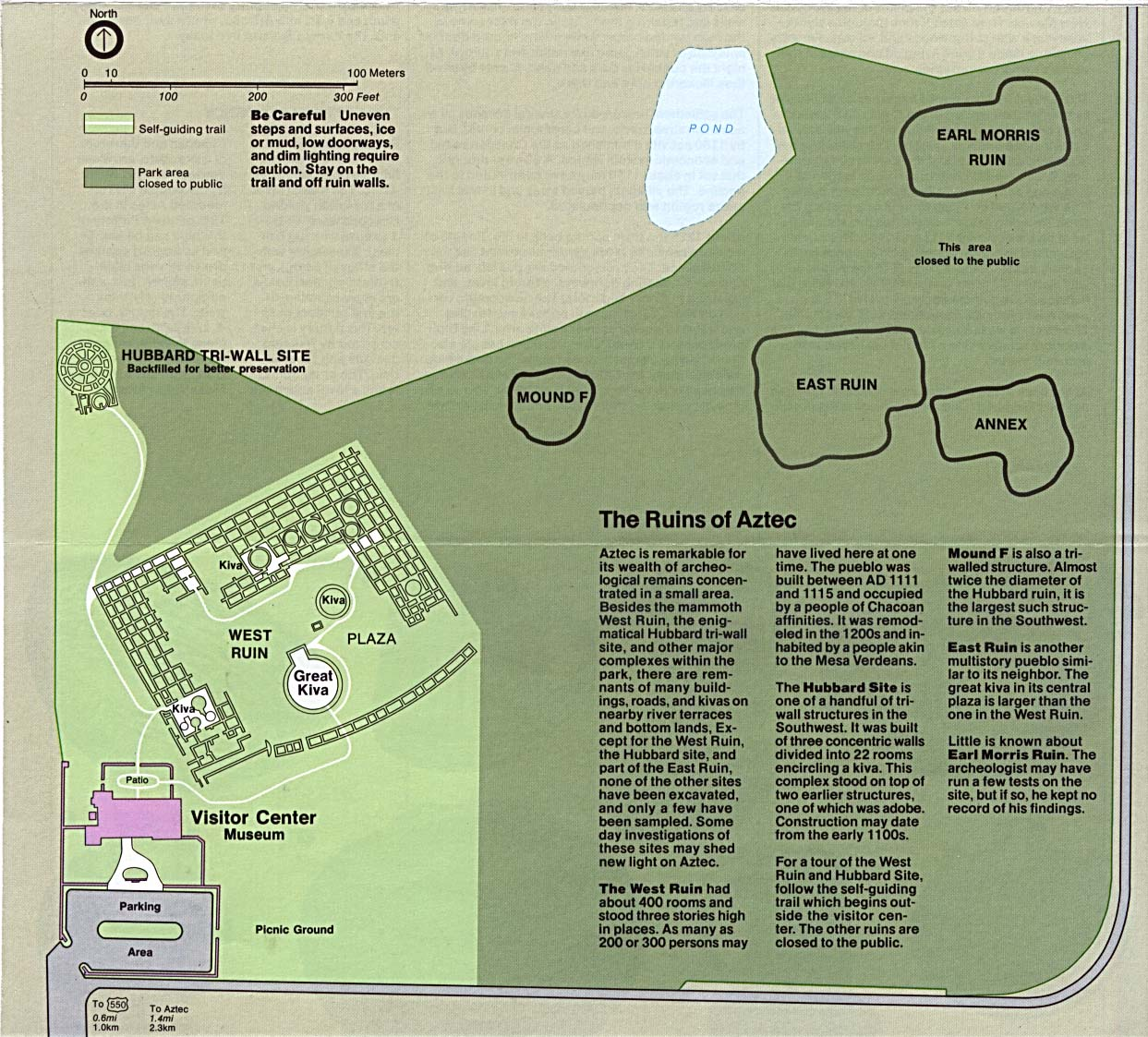
NPS Map
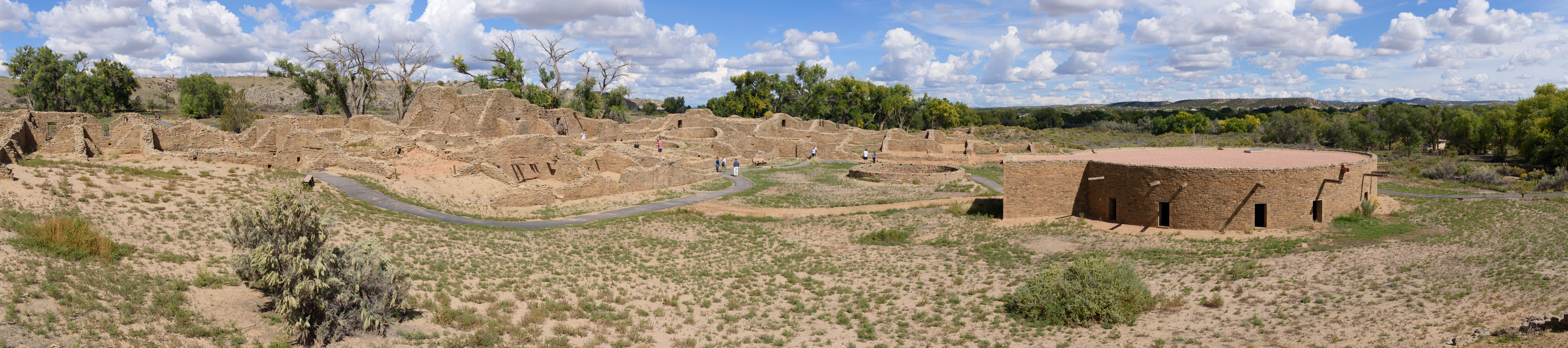
Aztec West, with reconstructed great kiva (right)

== See also ==
- National Register of Historic Places listings in San Juan County, New Mexico
- List of national monuments of the United States
- List of the oldest buildings in New Mexico
