= La Plata, New Mexico =

- Census-designated place
- Location within New Mexico
- Coordinates: 36°51′33″N 108°12′45″W
- Country: United States
- State: New Mexico
- County: San Juan

Area
  - Total: 22.17 sq mi (57.41 km^{2})
  - Land: 22.16 sq mi (57.40 km^{2})
  - Water: 0.0039 sq mi (0.01 km^{2})
- Elevation: 5,787 ft (1,764 m)

Population (2020)
  - Total: 2,105
  - Density: 95.0/sq mi (36.67/km^{2})
- Time zone: UTC-7 (Mountain (MST))
  - Summer (DST): UTC-6 (MDT)
- ZIP code: 87418
- Area code: 505
- GNIS feature ID: 2584132

La Plata is a census-designated place in San Juan County, New Mexico, United States. As of the 2020 census, La Plata had a population of 2,105. La Plata has a post office with ZIP code 87418. The community is located at the junction of state roads 170 and 574.

== Demographics ==
Historical population
| Census | Pop. | Note | %± |
|---|---|---|---|
| 2020 | 2,105 | | — |
U.S. Decennial Census

=== 2020 census ===
As of the 2020 census, La Plata had a population of 2,105. The median age was 40.0 years. 25.3% of residents were under the age of 18 and 18.0% of residents were 65 years of age or older. For every 100 females there were 103.4 males, and for every 100 females age 18 and over there were 100.5 males age 18 and over.

8.4% of residents lived in urban areas, while 91.6% lived in rural areas.

There were 769 households in La Plata, of which 32.6% had children under the age of 18 living in them. Of all households, 57.6% were married-couple households, 16.5% were households with a male householder and no spouse or partner present, and 18.3% were households with a female householder and no spouse or partner present. About 21.0% of all households were made up of individuals and 10.4% had someone living alone who was 65 years of age or older.

There were 878 housing units, of which 12.4% were vacant. The homeowner vacancy rate was 2.7% and the rental vacancy rate was 6.2%.

Racial composition as of the 2020 census
| Race | Number | Percent |
|---|---|---|
| White | 1,493 | 70.9% |
| Black or African American | 12 | 0.6% |
| American Indian and Alaska Native | 260 | 12.4% |
| Asian | 6 | 0.3% |
| Native Hawaiian and Other Pacific Islander | 7 | 0.3% |
| Some other race | 111 | 5.3% |
| Two or more races | 216 | 10.3% |
| Hispanic or Latino (of any race) | 333 | 15.8% |

== Education ==
Its school district is Farmington Municipal Schools.
