= Aztec, New Mexico =

Aztec Kinteel
- County Seat
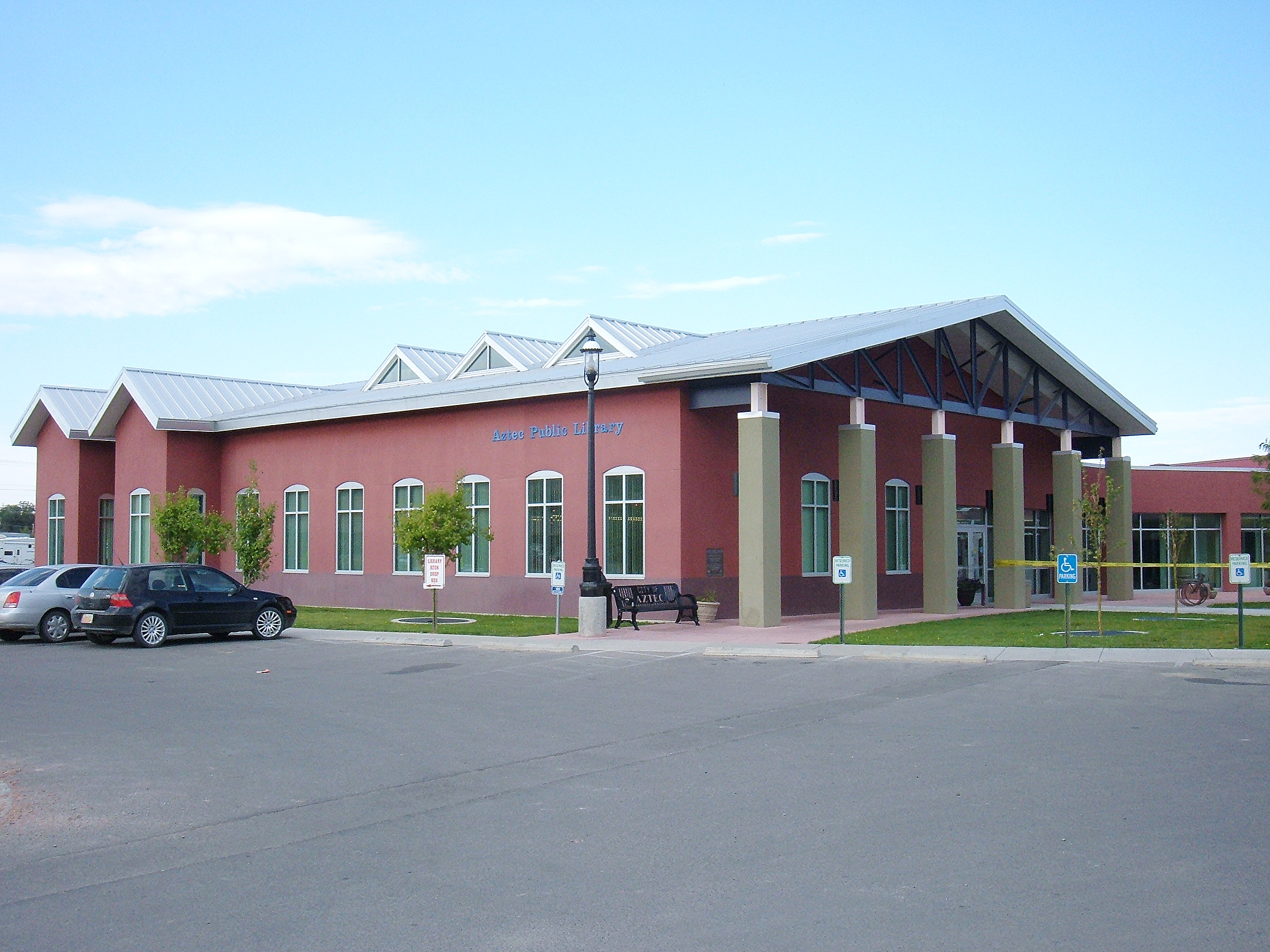
- Aztec Public Library

- Location within San Juan County and New Mexico

- Location in New Mexico Location in the United States
- Coordinates: 36°49′32″N 107°59′34″W
- Country: United States
- State: New Mexico
- County: San Juan

Area
  - Total: 17.15 sq mi (44.41 km^{2})
  - Land: 17.06 sq mi (44.19 km^{2})
  - Water: 0.085 sq mi (0.22 km^{2})
- Elevation: 5,820 ft (1,770 m)

Population (2020)
  - Total: 6,201
  - Density: 363.4/sq mi (140.32/km^{2})
- Time zone: UTC−07:00 (MST)
  - Summer (DST): UTC−06:00 (MDT)
- ZIP Code: 87410
- Area code: 505
- FIPS code: 35-05780
- GNIS ID: 2409767
- Website: aztecnm.gov

Aztec is a city in and the county seat of San Juan County, New Mexico, United States. The city population was 6,126 as of the 2022 population estimate. The Aztec Ruins National Monument is located in Aztec.

The city was the site of the Aztec, New Mexico crashed saucer hoax, and it was near the site of the unrelated Project Gasbuggy, an underground nuclear detonation managed by the Atomic Energy Commission.

The Aztec Museum hosts interpretive displays and preserved materials documenting each of the above. It also has materials related to the European-American settlement of the Aztec area.

== Geography ==
According to the United States Census Bureau, the city has a total area of 13.1 square miles (34 km^{2}), of which 0.1 square miles (0.26 km^{2}) (0.8%) is covered by water.

=== Climate ===
Aztec has a typical southwestern cool semi-arid climate (Köppen BSk) characterised by hot summers, chilly though not severe winters, and large diurnal temperature variation throughout the year.

Summers are generally hot to sweltering by afternoon, though with pleasant mornings and low humidity. On average, 50 afternoons surpass 90 °F or 32 °C, though only two pass 100 °F or 38 °C, and only five mornings between 1991 and 2020 stayed above 68 °F or 20 °C. Mornings become chilly quite early in the fall; the usual frost-free period is from May 10 to October 6, and frosts have occurred as early as September 9, 1989 and as late as June 26, 1975. Winter afternoons, though, remain relatively mild; only two afternoons stay below freezing during an average year, although two mornings during an average winter fall to or below 0 °F or −18 °C, and 153 mornings fall to or below freezing. The coldest temperature has been −27 °F or −33 °C on February 8, 1933, and the hottest 106 °F or 41 °C on July 11, 2021, and July 18, 2023.

Due to mountain rain shadow effects, precipitation is generally low, especially during the early summer between April and June. The wettest calendar year has been 1986 with 20.27 inches or 515 millimetres, and the driest 1917 with 2.90 inches or 74 millimetres. The wettest month has been August 1929 with 5.65 inches or 144 millimetres and the wettest day August 27, 2015, with 2.67 inches or 68 millimetres. Aridity severely limits snowfall: the mean is only 10.9 inches or 0.28 metres and the median only 8.5 inches (0.22 m). The most snowfall in a month has been in January 2024 with 26.9 inches or 68 centimetres, and the most in one day 11.0 inches or 28 centimetres on December 17, 1990.

Climate data for Aztec, New Mexico (Aztec Ruins National Monument) (1991–2020 normals, extremes 1895–1902 and 1919–present)
| Month | Jan | Feb | Mar | Apr | May | Jun | Jul | Aug | Sep | Oct | Nov | Dec | Year |
|---|---|---|---|---|---|---|---|---|---|---|---|---|---|
| Record high °F (°C) | 69 (21) | 78 (26) | 86 (30) | 89 (32) | 98 (37) | 105 (41) | 106 (41) | 105 (41) | 101 (38) | 92 (33) | 77 (25) | 69 (21) | 106 (41) |
| Mean maximum °F (°C) | 56.3 (13.5) | 62.7 (17.1) | 73.3 (22.9) | 80.7 (27.1) | 89.2 (31.8) | 96.8 (36.0) | 99.1 (37.3) | 95.8 (35.4) | 90.7 (32.6) | 81.8 (27.7) | 68.7 (20.4) | 57.2 (14.0) | 99.5 (37.5) |
| Mean daily maximum °F (°C) | 46.0 (7.8) | 52.5 (11.4) | 62.8 (17.1) | 70.6 (21.4) | 79.8 (26.6) | 90.3 (32.4) | 93.9 (34.4) | 91.2 (32.9) | 84.2 (29.0) | 71.7 (22.1) | 57.7 (14.3) | 46.4 (8.0) | 70.6 (21.4) |
| Daily mean °F (°C) | 31.6 (−0.2) | 37.0 (2.8) | 44.9 (7.2) | 51.7 (10.9) | 60.4 (15.8) | 70.0 (21.1) | 76.1 (24.5) | 74.0 (23.3) | 66.3 (19.1) | 53.7 (12.1) | 41.5 (5.3) | 32.1 (0.1) | 53.3 (11.8) |
| Mean daily minimum °F (°C) | 17.1 (−8.3) | 21.5 (−5.8) | 27.0 (−2.8) | 32.7 (0.4) | 41.0 (5.0) | 49.7 (9.8) | 58.2 (14.6) | 56.9 (13.8) | 48.5 (9.2) | 35.7 (2.1) | 25.3 (−3.7) | 17.8 (−7.9) | 35.9 (2.2) |
| Mean minimum °F (°C) | 2.8 (−16.2) | 8.1 (−13.3) | 14.1 (−9.9) | 19.9 (−6.7) | 29.7 (−1.3) | 38.2 (3.4) | 48.6 (9.2) | 49.5 (9.7) | 35.1 (1.7) | 21.6 (−5.8) | 11.7 (−11.3) | 3.2 (−16.0) | −0.8 (−18.2) |
| Record low °F (°C) | −26 (−32) | −27 (−33) | −3 (−19) | 2 (−17) | 12 (−11) | 24 (−4) | 39 (4) | 36 (2) | 22 (−6) | 6 (−14) | −7 (−22) | −24 (−31) | −27 (−33) |
| Average precipitation inches (mm) | 0.90 (23) | 0.75 (19) | 0.77 (20) | 0.69 (18) | 0.71 (18) | 0.28 (7.1) | 0.96 (24) | 1.32 (34) | 1.13 (29) | 0.94 (24) | 0.94 (24) | 0.67 (17) | 10.06 (256) |
| Average snowfall inches (cm) | 4.5 (11) | 2.3 (5.8) | 0.5 (1.3) | 0.2 (0.51) | 0.1 (0.25) | 0.0 (0.0) | 0.0 (0.0) | 0.0 (0.0) | 0.0 (0.0) | 0.3 (0.76) | 0.9 (2.3) | 2.2 (5.6) | 10.9 (28) |
| Average precipitation days (≥ 0.01 inch) | 5.6 | 5.1 | 4.4 | 3.7 | 3.8 | 2.1 | 5.1 | 7.0 | 5.7 | 4.7 | 4.2 | 5.1 | 56.5 |
| Average snowy days (≥ 0.1 inch) | 2.3 | 1.7 | 0.5 | 0.2 | 0.0 | 0.0 | 0.0 | 0.0 | 0.0 | 0.2 | 0.7 | 1.7 | 7.3 |
Source: NOAA

== Demographics ==
Aztec is part of the Farmington, New Mexico Metropolitan Statistical Area.

Historical population
| Census | Pop. | Note | %± |
|---|---|---|---|
| 1910 | 509 | | — |
| 1920 | 489 | | −3.9% |
| 1930 | 740 | | 51.3% |
| 1940 | 756 | | 2.2% |
| 1950 | 885 | | 17.1% |
| 1960 | 4,137 | | 367.5% |
| 1970 | 3,354 | | −18.9% |
| 1980 | 5,512 | | 64.3% |
| 1990 | 5,479 | | −0.6% |
| 2000 | 6,378 | | 16.4% |
| 2010 | 6,763 | | 6.0% |
| 2020 | 6,201 | | −8.3% |
U.S. Decennial Census

=== 2020 census ===
As of the 2020 census, Aztec had a population of 6,201. The median age was 37.9 years. 23.8% of residents were under the age of 18 and 17.6% of residents were 65 years of age or older. For every 100 females there were 92.0 males, and for every 100 females age 18 and over there were 87.9 males age 18 and over.

89.5% of residents lived in urban areas, while 10.5% lived in rural areas.

There were 2,549 households in Aztec, of which 31.3% had children under the age of 18 living in them. Of all households, 38.6% were married-couple households, 20.6% were households with a male householder and no spouse or partner present, and 31.7% were households with a female householder and no spouse or partner present. About 32.4% of all households were made up of individuals and 13.8% had someone living alone who was 65 years of age or older.

There were 2,887 housing units, of which 11.7% were vacant. The homeowner vacancy rate was 4.4% and the rental vacancy rate was 8.2%.

Racial composition as of the 2020 census
| Race | Number | Percent |
|---|---|---|
| White | 4,164 | 67.2% |
| Black or African American | 22 | 0.4% |
| American Indian and Alaska Native | 716 | 11.5% |
| Asian | 42 | 0.7% |
| Native Hawaiian and Other Pacific Islander | 4 | 0.1% |
| Some other race | 449 | 7.2% |
| Two or more races | 804 | 13.0% |
| Hispanic or Latino (of any race) | 1,506 | 24.3% |

=== 2000 census ===
As of the census of 2000, 6,378 people, 2,330 households, and 1,589 families were residing in the city. The population density was 253.1/km^{2} (656/mi^{2}). The 2,545 housing units had an average density of 101.0/km^{2} (262/mi^{2}). The racial makeup of the city was 79.23% White, 0.38% African American, 9.31% Native American, 0.14% Asian, 0.13% Pacific Islander, 7.53% from other races, and 3.29% from two or more races. About 19.22% of the population were Hispanic or Latino of any race.

Of the 2,330 households, 35.3% had children under 18 living with them, 50.5% were married couples living together, 12.5% had a female householder with no husband present, and 31.8% were not families. About 27.6% of all households were made up of individuals, and 11.5% had someone living alone who was 65 or older. The average household size was 2.51 and the average family size was 3.06.

In the city, the age distribution was 26.6% under 18, 10.7% from 18 to 24, 29.5% from 25 to 44, 20.2% from 45 to 64, and 13.0% who were 65 or older. The median age was 34 years. For every 100 females, there were 104.6 males. For every 100 females 18 and over, there were 101.1 males.

The median income for a household in the city was $33,110, and for a family was $39,509. Males had a median income of $36,845 versus $17,841 for females. The per capita income for the city was $14,750. 17.4% of the population and 14.6% of families were below the poverty line. Out of the total people living in poverty, 20.6% were under the age of 18 and 15.7% were 65 or older.

== Arts and culture ==
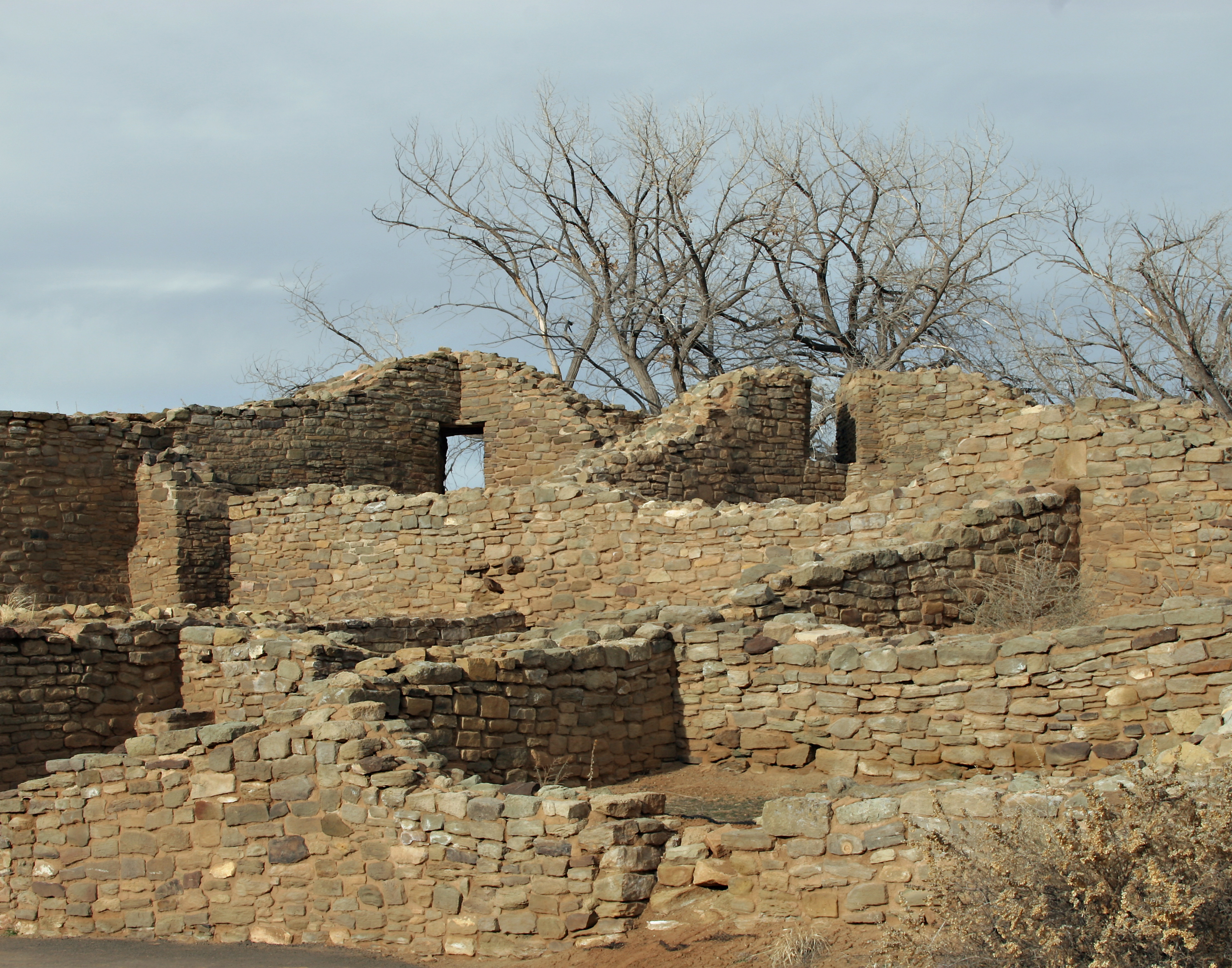
Aztec Ruins National Monument

Aztec Ruins National Monument within Aztec is part of the greater Chaco Culture UNESCO World Heritage site.

== Parks and recreation ==
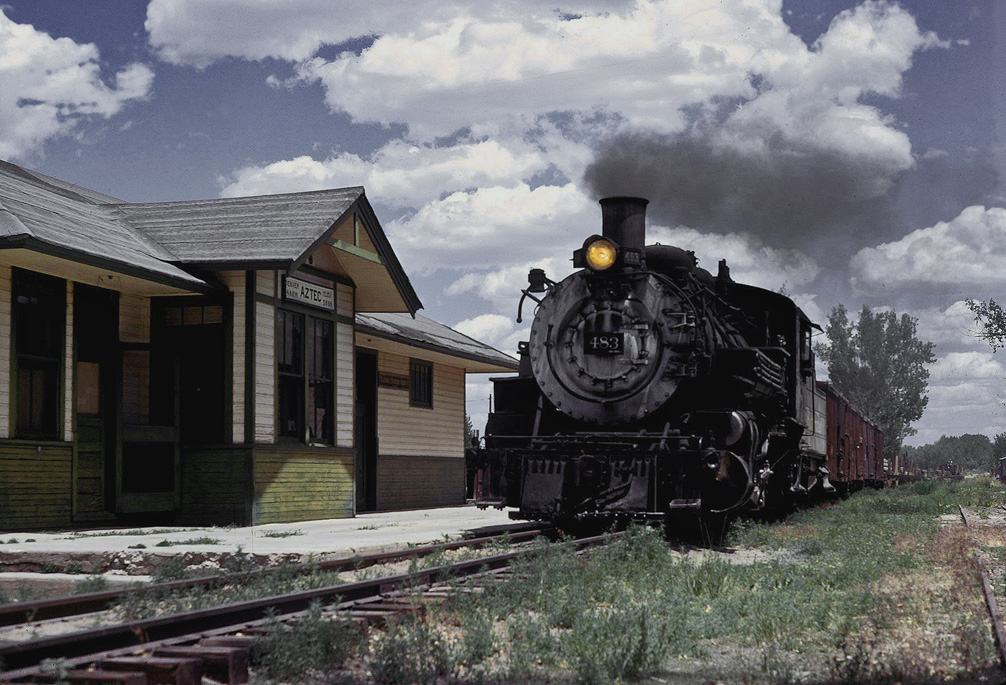
Denver and Rio Grande Western steam train at Aztec depot, 1967

As of 2016, Aztec had 16 park and special-use areas totaling 153.5 acres (62.1 ha), and 15.6 km (9.7 mi) of pedestrian trails.

== Government ==
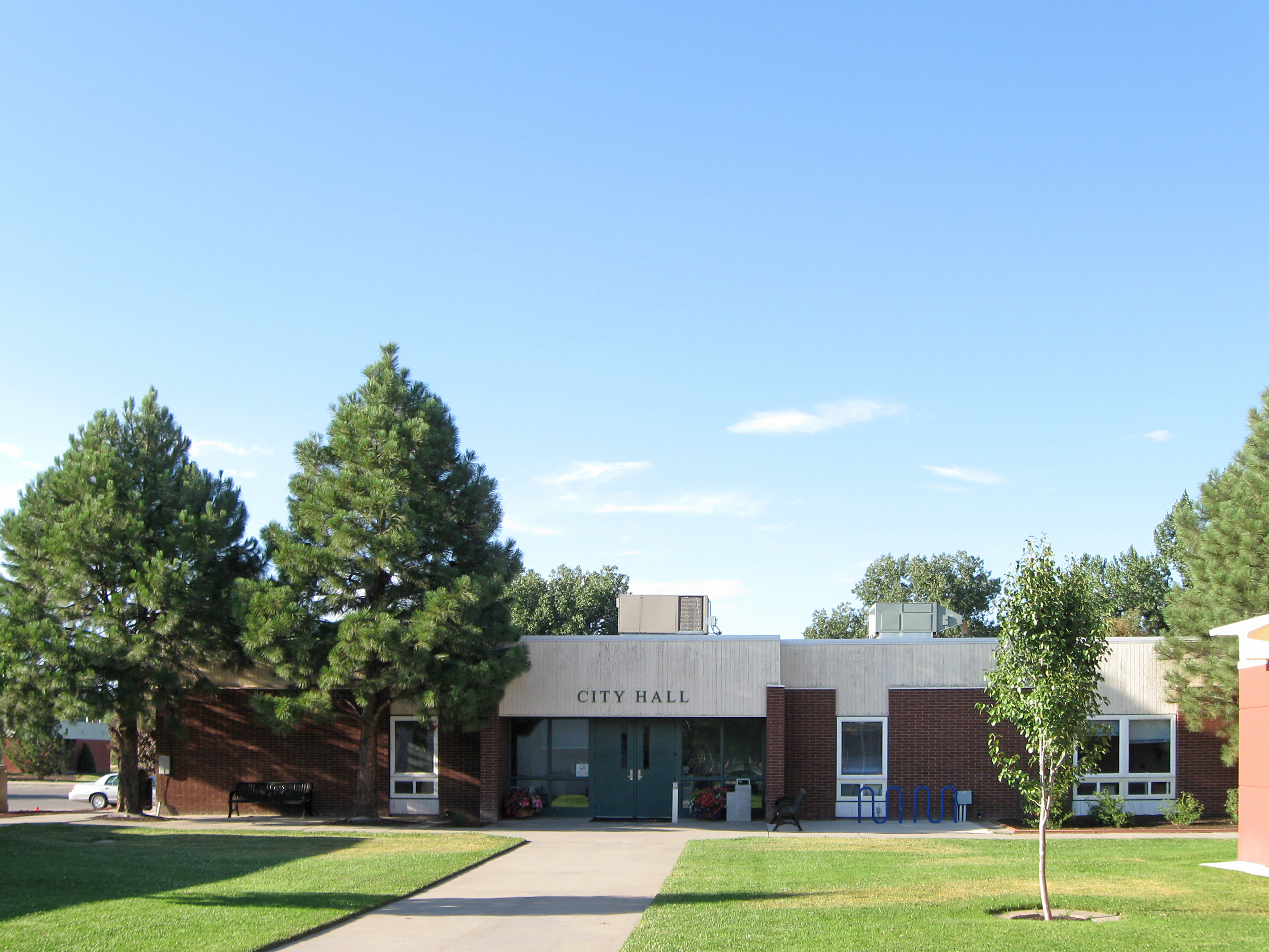
Aztec City Hall

The City of Aztec practices a commission-manager form of government as established in the New Mexico state statutes. The five commissioners are elected from each of the five districts. The mayor and mayor pro-tempore are elected among the five commissioners.

== Education ==
Aztec Municipal Schools serves the City of Aztec and rural areas in northeastern San Juan County.

== Infrastructure ==
=== Transportation ===
General-aviation service is available at the Aztec Municipal Airport.

Highway 516 and U.S. Highway 550 pass through Aztec.

=== Utilities ===
Water comes from surface-water sources, including the Aztec Ditch, Lower Animas Ditch, and the Animas River. The city maintains its own water-treatment plant.

Electricity is maintained by the Aztec Electric Department, which has a compact electric system with 39 miles of distribution line. The city does not own any generation facilities. The city owns a short segment of 69 kV transmission line within its service territory, and it receives all its electricity through a single substation. As of 2023, the city purchased all its energy requirements from contracts with the Western Area Power Association and the Public Service Company of New Mexico.

== Notable people ==
- Paul Bandy, member of the New Mexico House of Representatives
- Larry Harlow, former outfielder for the California Angels
- Alex Kennedy, stock-car racing driver
- Uma Krishnaswami, author of children's books
- T. Ryan Lane, attorney and member of the New Mexico House of Representatives
- Steven Neville, real estate appraiser and member of the New Mexico Senate
- Sandra Townsend, former member of the New Mexico House of Representatives

== See also ==
- List of municipalities in New Mexico
- Aztec, New Mexico, UFO incident
