= Crouch Mesa, New Mexico =

- Census-designated place
- Location within New Mexico Location within the United States
- Coordinates: 36°45′17″N 108°4′16″W
- Country: United States
- State: New Mexico
- County: San Juan

Area
  - Total: 20.68 sq mi (53.55 km^{2})
  - Land: 20.68 sq mi (53.55 km^{2})
  - Water: 0 sq mi (0.00 km^{2})
- Elevation: 5,771 ft (1,759 m)

Population (2020)
  - Total: 5,257
  - Density: 254.3/sq mi (98.18/km^{2})
- Time zone: UTC-7 (Mountain (MST))
  - Summer (DST): UTC-6 (MDT)
- ZIP Code: 87401 (Farmington); 87410 (Aztec)
- Area code: 505
- FIPS code: 35-18905
- GNIS feature ID: 2806751

Crouch Mesa is an unincorporated community and census-designated place (CDP) in San Juan County, New Mexico, United States. It was first listed as a CDP prior to the 2020 census. As of the 2020 census, Crouch Mesa had a population of 5,257.

The CDP is in northeastern San Juan County, bordered to the southwest by the city of Farmington and to the south by Lee Acres. Crouch Mesa Road (County Road 350) is the main route through the community, leading south 4 miles (6 km) to U.S. Route 64 in Lee Acres and north 3.5 miles (5.6 km) to State Road 516 in Flora Vista.

== Demographics ==
Historical population
| Census | Pop. | Note | %± |
|---|---|---|---|
| 2020 | 5,257 | | — |
U.S. Decennial Census

=== 2020 census ===
As of the 2020 census, Crouch Mesa had a population of 5,257. The median age was 32.8 years. 30.2% of residents were under the age of 18 and 10.6% of residents were 65 years of age or older. For every 100 females there were 99.3 males, and for every 100 females age 18 and over there were 97.0 males age 18 and over.

34.5% of residents lived in urban areas, while 65.5% lived in rural areas.

There were 1,585 households in Crouch Mesa, of which 42.0% had children under the age of 18 living in them. Of all households, 50.3% were married-couple households, 15.5% were households with a male householder and no spouse or partner present, and 24.6% were households with a female householder and no spouse or partner present. About 18.0% of all households were made up of individuals and 7.3% had someone living alone who was 65 years of age or older.

There were 1,766 housing units, of which 10.2% were vacant. The homeowner vacancy rate was 0.3% and the rental vacancy rate was 17.2%.

Racial composition as of the 2020 census
| Race | Number | Percent |
|---|---|---|
| White | 2,230 | 42.4% |
| Black or African American | 20 | 0.4% |
| American Indian and Alaska Native | 1,686 | 32.1% |
| Asian | 4 | 0.1% |
| Native Hawaiian and Other Pacific Islander | 1 | 0.0% |
| Some other race | 709 | 13.5% |
| Two or more races | 607 | 11.5% |
| Hispanic or Latino (of any race) | 1,700 | 32.3% |

== Education ==
Crouch Mesa is divided between Farmington Municipal Schools (the majority) and Aztec Municipal Schools (a minority section). Aztec High School is the local high school of the latter.
