= New Mexico State Road 511 =

Highway in New Mexico

State Road 511

Route information
- Maintained by NMDOT
- Length: 32.346 mi (52.056 km)

Major junctions
- South end: US 64 southwest of Turley
- North end: SH 172 at the Colorado state line in La Boca

Location
- Country: United States
- State: New Mexico
- Counties: San Juan

Highway system
- New Mexico State Highway System; Interstate; US; State; Scenic
← NM 510	→ NM 512

State Road 511 (NM 511) is a 32.346-mile-long (52.056 km) state highway in the US state of New Mexico. NM 511's southern terminus is at U.S. Route 64 (US 64) southwest of Turley, and the northern terminus is at Colorado State Highway 172 (SH 172) at the New Mexico/ Colorado state line.

== Major intersections ==
The entire route is in San Juan County.

Location	mi	km	Destinations	Notes
	0.000	0.000	US 64	Southern terminus
	8.170	13.148	NM 173 west	Eastern terminus of NM 173
Navajo Dam	13.900	22.370	NM 539 south	Northern terminus of NM 539
	32.346	52.056	SH 172	Northern terminus, continues north into Colorado
1.000 mi = 1.609 km; 1.000 km = 0.621 mi
