= Middle Mesa, New Mexico =

- Census-designated place
- Location within New Mexico Location within the United States
- Coordinates: 36°59′37″N 107°29′19″W
- Country: United States
- State: New Mexico
- County: San Juan

Area
  - Total: 6.71 sq mi (17.38 km^{2})
  - Land: 6.71 sq mi (17.37 km^{2})
  - Water: 0.0039 sq mi (0.01 km^{2})
- Elevation: 6,493 ft (1,979 m)

Population (2020)
  - Total: 200
  - Density: 29.8/sq mi (11.51/km^{2})
- Time zone: UTC-7 (Mountain (MST))
  - Summer (DST): UTC-6 (MDT)
- ZIP Code: 87419 (Navajo Dam); 81137 (Ignacio, CO)
- Area code: 505
- FIPS code: 35-48435
- GNIS feature ID: 2584241

Middle Mesa is a census-designated place (CDP) in San Juan County, New Mexico, United States. It was first listed as a CDP following the 2010 census, replacing the Young Place CDP. As of the 2020 census, Middle Mesa had a population of 200.

== Geography ==
The CDP is in the extreme northeast corner of the county, bordered to the north by La Plata and Archuleta counties in Colorado. It is to the west of Navajo Reservoir on the San Juan River. It is 30 miles (48 km) by as the crow flies and 50 miles (80 km) by road northeast of Aztec, the San Juan county seat, and 7 miles (11 km) southwest of Arboles, Colorado.

== Demographics ==
Historical population
Census	Pop.	Note	%±
2020	200		—
U.S. Decennial Census
