= Angustura, New Mexico =

- Census-designated place
- Location within New Mexico Location within the United States
- Coordinates: 36°42′50″N 107°54′56″W
- Country: United States
- State: New Mexico
- County: San Juan

Area
  - Total: 4.85 sq mi (12.56 km^{2})
  - Land: 4.77 sq mi (12.36 km^{2})
  - Water: 0.077 sq mi (0.20 km^{2})
- Elevation: 5,506 ft (1,678 m)

Population (2020)
  - Total: 1,407
  - Density: 294.9/sq mi (113.87/km^{2})
- Time zone: UTC-7 (Mountain (MST))
  - Summer (DST): UTC-6 (MDT)
- ZIP Code: 87413 (Bloomfield)
- Area code: 505
- FIPS code: 35-03680
- GNIS feature ID: 2806747

Angustura is an unincorporated community and census-designated place (CDP) in San Juan County, New Mexico, United States. It was first listed as a CDP prior to the 2020 census. As of the 2020 census, Angustura had a population of 1,407.

The CDP is in the northeast part of the county, bordered to the west by the city of Bloomfield and to the east by Blanco. The San Juan River forms the southern border of the community. U.S. Route 64 passes through Angustura, leading west through Bloomfield 17 miles (27 km) to Farmington and east 67 miles (108 km) to Dulce.

== Demographics ==
Historical population
Census	Pop.	Note	%±
2020	1,407		—
U.S. Decennial Census

== Education ==
The area school district is Bloomfield Schools. Bloomfield High School is the local high school.
