= Bloomfield School District =

Bloomfield School District may refer to:

- Bloomfield Public Schools – Bloomfield, Connecticut
- Bloomfield School District – Bloomfield, Indiana
- Bloomfield Public Schools – Bloomfield, New Jersey
- Bloomfield Schools – Bloomfield, New Mexico.
- Bloomfield School District – Bloomfield, Missouri
