= Colorado State Highway 172 =

State highway in Colorado, United States

State Highway 172
- SH 172 highlighted in red

Route information
- Maintained by CDOT
- Length: 24.5 mi (39.4 km)

Major junctions
- South end: NM 511 at the New Mexico state line in La Boca, NM
- SH 151 in Ignacio
- North end: US 160 southeast of Durango

Location
- Country: United States
- State: Colorado
- Counties: La Plata

Highway system
- Colorado State Highway System; Interstate; US; State; Scenic
← SH 170	→ SH 177

State Highway 172 (SH 172) is a 24.5 mi (39.4 km) long state highway in southwestern Colorado. SH 172's southern terminus is at New Mexico State Road 511 (NM 511) at the New Mexico state line, and the northern terminus is at U.S. Route 160 (US 160) southeast of Durango.

== Route description ==
SH 172 begins in the south at the New Mexico state line where the road becomes NM 511. From there, the route travels through the Southern Ute Indian Reservation northward through Ignacio where it meets the western end of SH 151. From Ignacio, the road gradually arcs to the west and passes westward through Falfa before again turning northward to meet its northern end at a junction with US 160 approximately eight miles southeast of Durango.

== History ==
The route was established in the 1930s, when it connected US 160 to Arboles. The route was paved from US 160 to Ignacio by 1954 and to Arboles by 1960. The southern end of the road was changed to the New Mexico state line by 1972.

== Major intersections ==
The entire route is in La Plata County.

Location	mi	km	Destinations	Notes
	0.000	0.000	NM 511	Continuation as NM 511 at the New Mexico border
Ignacio	8.903	14.328	SH 151 east (Ute Street) – Arboles	Western terminus of SH 151
	24.499	39.427	US 160 – Bayfield, Durango	Northern terminus
1.000 mi = 1.609 km; 1.000 km = 0.621 mi
