= Riverside, San Juan County, New Mexico =

Unincorporated community in New Mexico, United States

Riverside
- unincorporated community
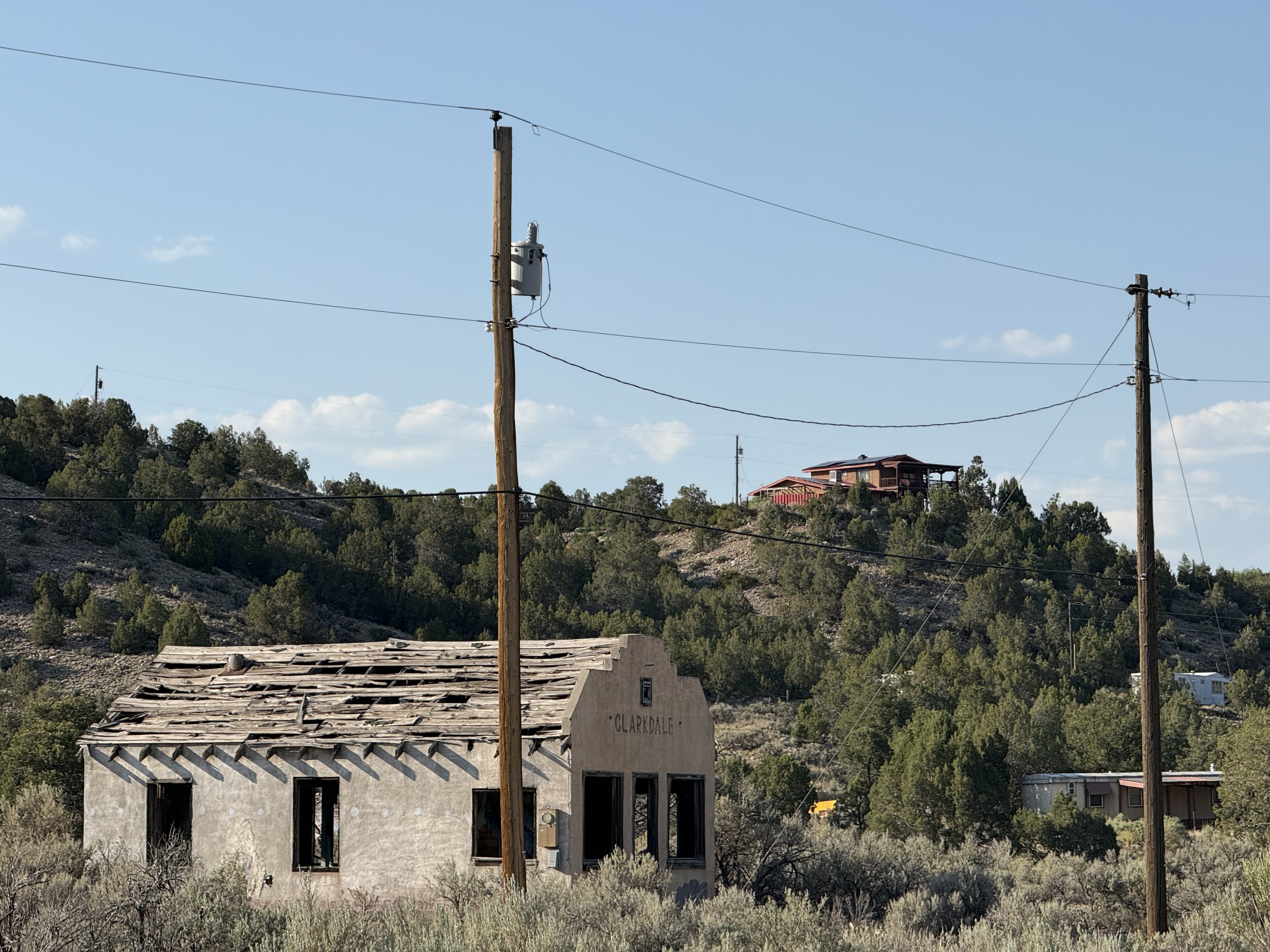

- Location within the state of New Mexico Riverside (the United States)
- Coordinates: 36°58′57″N 107°52′31″W
- Country: United States
- State: New Mexico
- County: San Juan
- Elevation: 5,968 ft (1,819 m)
- Time zone: UTC-7 (MST)
  - Summer (DST): UTC-6 (MDT)
- ZIP codes: 87410
- Area code: 505
- GNIS feature ID: 902344

Riverside (Hendricks) is an unincorporated community in San Juan County, New Mexico, United States. It is on the right bank of the Animas River, approximately one mile south of the Colorado border on U.S. Route 550, at its intersection with county roads 2090 and 2093. The nearest settlement is Cedar Hill, 3.5 miles (5.6 km) to the south.

== History ==
Until circa 1876, the area was generally acknowledged to be the land of the Jicarilla Apache and their Ute allies; in 1887, it was officially excluded from the Jicarillas' new reservation. Anglo settlement began shortly thereafter. Riverside had its own post office starting from 1905 until 1938.
