= New Mexico State Road 575 =

State highway in New Mexico, United States

State Road 575
- NM 575 highlighted in red

Route information
- Maintained by NMDOT
- Length: 7.896 mi (12.707 km)

Major junctions
- South end: US 64 in Blanco
- North end: NM 173 near Aztec

Location
- Country: United States
- State: New Mexico
- Counties: San Juan

Highway system
- New Mexico State Highway System; Interstate; US; State; Scenic
| ← NM 574 | → NM 576 |

State Road 575 (NM 575) is a 7.896-mile-long (12.707 km) state highway in the US state of New Mexico. NM 575's southern terminus is at U.S. Route 64 (US 64) in Blanco, and the northern terminus is at NM 173 east of Aztec.

== Major intersections ==
The entire route is in San Juan County.

| Location | mi | km | Destinations | Notes |
|---|---|---|---|---|
| Blanco | 0.000 | 0.000 | US 64 | Southern terminus |
| | 7.896 | 12.707 | NM 173 | Northern terminus |
1.000 mi = 1.609 km; 1.000 km = 0.621 mi
