= Aztec Municipal Schools =

School district in New Mexico, United States

Aztec Municipal Schools (also known as the Aztec Municipal School District) is a public school district based in Aztec, New Mexico, United States. The district covers a 413-square-mile (1,070 km^{2}) area in northeastern San Juan County.

In addition to Aztec, the district also serves northern Bloomfield and the communities of Cedar Hill, Center Point, and La Boca. The district also includes most of Flora Vista, North Light Plant, and Spencerville, as well as portions of Crouch Mesa and Navajo Dam.

== Schools ==
- Aztec High School (Grades 9-12)
- Koogler Middle School (Grades 6-8)
- Park Avenue Elementary School (Grades 4-5)
- McCoy Elementary School (Grades PK-3)
- Lydia Rippey Elementary School (Grades PK-3)
- Vista Nueva High School (Alternative; Grades 9-12)

== Enrollment ==
- 2007-2008 School Year: 3,251 students
- 2006-2007 School Year: 3,184 students
- 2005-2006 School Year: 3,244 students
- 2004-2005 School Year: 3,177 students
- 2003-2004 School Year: 3,229 students
- 2002-2003 School Year: 3,266 students
- 2001-2002 School Year: 3,379 students
- 2000-2001 School Year: 3,350 students

== Demographics ==
There were a total of 3,251 students enrolled in Aztec Municipal Schools during the 2007-2008 school year. The gender makeup of the district was 48.91% female and 51.09% male. The racial makeup of the district was 62.20% White, 23.41% Hispanic, 12.89% Native American, 0.83% African American, and 0.68% Asian/Pacific Islander.

== See also ==
- List of school districts in New Mexico
