= La Boca, New Mexico =

- Census-designated place
- Location within New Mexico Location within the United States
- Coordinates: 36°59′40″N 107°36′23″W
- Country: United States
- State: New Mexico
- County: San Juan

Area
  - Total: 0.56 sq mi (1.44 km^{2})
  - Land: 0.56 sq mi (1.44 km^{2})
  - Water: 0 sq mi (0.00 km^{2})
- Elevation: 6,283 ft (1,915 m)

Population (2020)
  - Total: 38
  - Density: 68.2/sq mi (26.35/km^{2})
- Time zone: UTC-7 (Mountain (MST))
  - Summer (DST): UTC-6 (MDT)
- ZIP Code: 87419 (Navajo Dam)
- Area code: 505
- FIPS code: 35-36567
- GNIS feature ID: 2806753

La Boca is an unincorporated community and census-designated place (CDP) in San Juan County, New Mexico, United States. It was first listed as a CDP prior to the 2020 census. As of the 2020 census, La Boca had a population of 38.

The CDP is in the northeast corner of the county, bordered to the north by La Plata County, Colorado. New Mexico State Road 511 passes through the community, leading south 18 miles (29 km) to Navajo Dam. To the north, the road becomes Colorado State Highway 172, leading 9 miles (14 km) to Ignacio.

La Boca is bordered to the east by Los Pinos River, which flows southward to join the San Juan River in Navajo Lake.

== Demographics ==
Historical population
Census	Pop.	Note	%±
2020	38		—
U.S. Decennial Census

== Education ==
The school district is Aztec Municipal Schools. Aztec High School is the local high school.
