= Farmington Municipal Schools =

School district in New Mexico, United States

Farmington Municipal Schools (also known as the Farmington Municipal School District) is a public school district based in Farmington, New Mexico, United States.

The district covers an 807-square-mile (2,090 km^{2}) area in central San Juan County.

In addition to Farmington, the district also serves the communities of La Plata, Lake Valley, Napi HQ, Totah Vista. It also serves most of Crouch Mesa and Lee Acres, as well as portions of Center Point, Flora Vista, North Light Plant, Spencerville.

All FMS district schools above elementary school are supplied with MacBook computers in which the teachers and students can use and take home with them.

== Schools ==
=== High schools ===
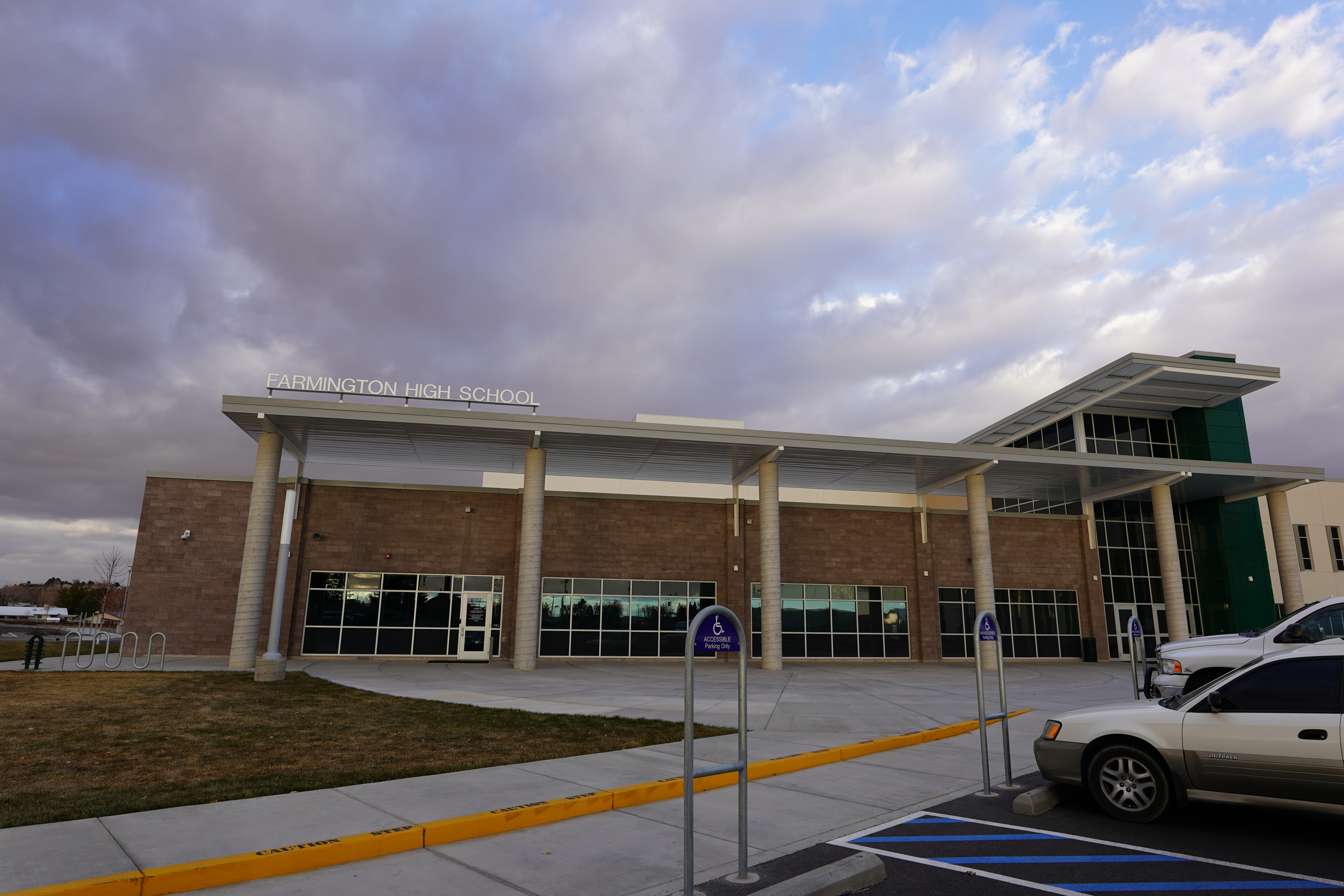
Farmington High School

- Farmington High School
- Piedra Vista High School
- Rocinante High School (Alternative)
- San Juan College High School (Early College)
- New Mexico Virtual Academy (Online)

=== Middle schools ===
- Heights Middle School
- Hermosa Middle School
- Mesa View Middle School
- Tibbetts Middle School

=== Elementary schools ===
- Animas Elementary School
- Apache Elementary School
- Bluffview Elementary School
- Country Club Elementary School
- Esperanza Elementary School
- Ladera Elementary School
- McCormick Elementary School
- McKinley Elementary School
- Mesa Verde Elementary School
- Northeast Elementary School

=== Other Campuses ===
==== Preschools ====
- Farmington Preschool Academy

== Enrollment ==
- 2013-2014 School Year: 11,651 students
- 2007-2008 School Year: 10,253 students
- 2006-2007 School Year: 10,080 students
- 2005-2006 School Year: 10,254 students
- 2004-2005 School Year: 10,135 students
- 2003-2004 School Year: 10,055 students
- 2002-2003 School Year: 10,126 students
- 2001-2002 School Year: 10,215 students
- 2000-2001 School Year: 10,209 students

== Demographics ==
There were a total of 10,253 students enrolled in Farmington Municipal Schools during the 2007–2008 school year. The gender makeup of the district was 48.70% female and 51.30% male. The racial makeup of the district was 43.00% White, 29.94% Native American, 24.94% Hispanic, 1.44% African American, and 0.67% Asian/Pacific Islander.

== See also ==
- List of school districts in New Mexico
