= Merril Sandoval =

Navajo code talker (1925–2008)

Merril L. Sandoval
- Born: April 15, 1925; Near Kimbeto, New Mexico, United States
- Died: February 9, 2008 (aged 82); Phoenix, Arizona, United States
- Parent: Julian Sandoval

Merril L. Sandoval (April 18, 1925 – February 9, 2008) was an American Navajo World War II veteran and a member of the Navajo Code Talkers, a group of United States Marines who transmitted important messages in their native Navajo language in order to stop the Japanese from intercepting sensitive material. Sandoval took part in every Marine landing in the Pacific Ocean theater of World War II from 1943 until 1945.

== Early life ==
Merril Sandoval was born on April 18, 1925, in Nageezi, New Mexico. His first language was Navajo. He was later enrolled at Farmington Methodist Mission School in Farmington, New Mexico, where he was taught English and other subjects meant to Americanize himself and other Navajos.

Sandoval's maternal, or first, clan was the Zuni Edgewater clan (Naashtʼézhí Tábąąhá), and his paternal, or second, clan was the Red Bottom People clan (Tl'aashchi'l).

== Navajo Code Talkers ==
Sandoval was only a freshman in high school when he was first approached by United States Marine recruiters. His brother, Samuel, enlisted. However, Sandoval's father, Julian Sandoval, insisted that Sandoval, who was then sixteen years old, was too young to join the Marines. Sandoval was allowed to join the Marines by his father one year later. He never worked with his brother, Samuel, who was also a code talker during the war.

Sandoval boarded a train to Santa Fe, New Mexico, when he was 17 years old, where he enlisted in the United States Marine Corps in 1943. He completed boot camp in San Diego before being transferred to Camp Pendleton's Radio Communication School, where he was trained to become a code talker.

He was initially sent to Hawaii by the Marines. Throughout World War II, Sandoval served with both the 2nd and 5th Marine Divisions. Sandoval's main mission was to remain behind the front lines in order to translate reports from two-man code talker teams in other parts of the battlefield. He then sent the messages, which were encoded in Navajo, back to United States commanders who were based on Hawaii. He also had the responsibility of passing orders to Marines on the front lines.

Sandoval saw action in Iwo Jima, Saipan and Allied occupied Japan. During the Battle of Iwo Jima, Sandoval's landing craft was hit by enemy fire. He and his radio company were thrown into the Pacific Ocean. He managed to swim approximately 100 yards to the Iwo Jima beach, where he survived a constant barrage of shelling by the Japanese for the next twenty-four hours.

Sandoval was honorably discharged from the military in March 1946 as a U.S. Marine corporal. He returned to the United States in order to finish high school. Sandoval and other Code Talkers were ordered to keep their work in the Pacific a secret following the war. His own family did not learn about the importance of his missions until information concerning the Navajo Code Talkers was declassified in 1968.

== Post World War II ==
Sandoval married Lorraine Humetewa Shingoitewa in July 1951. They had five children.

Soon after his marriage, he took a job as a machinist at the Garrett AiResearch facility in Phoenix, Arizona, where he worked for 15 years. He and his family moved to Lorraine's hometown of Tuba City, Arizona, on the Navajo Nation in 1963, where he joined the Navajo Tribal Police Force, which he served in for three years. He then became a legal advocate for D.N.A. Legal Services, a nonprofit law firm. He retired from the organization after 23 years. Sandoval then worked as an interpreter for the Navajo legal courts for an additional sixteen years.

== Traveling Years ==
As an elderly man, Merril traveled across the country to share his personal story and experiences as a Navajo Code Talker with the US Marine Corps. He continued to travel up until Fall 2007.

== Death ==
Merril Sandoval died on February 9, 2008, at the age of 82 at St. Joseph's Hospital and Medical Center in Phoenix. He had been in failing health for the preceding year. He and his wife of 56 years, Lorraine, had been residents of Tuba City, Arizona, for many years. He was survived by his wife and four of their five children. He had 17 grandchildren, 22 great-grandchildren and one great-great grandchild.

Sandoval received a full military burial in Flagstaff, Arizona. Navajo President Joe Shirley, Jr. ordered flags to be flown at half staff from February 13 to 16 in his honor.
