= New Mexico State Road 539 =

State highway in New Mexico, United States

State Road 539
- NM 539 highlighted in red

Route information
- Maintained by NMDOT
- Length: 5.840 mi (9.399 km)

Major junctions
- South end: US 64 in Navajo City
- North end: NM 511 in Navajo Dam

Location
- Country: United States
- State: New Mexico
- Counties: San Juan, Rio Arriba

Highway system
- New Mexico State Highway System; Interstate; US; State; Scenic
← NM 538	→ NM 540

State Road 539 (NM 539) is a 5.840-mile-long (9.399 km) state highway in the US state of New Mexico. NM 539's southern terminus is at U.S. Route 64 (US 64) in Navajo City, and the northern terminus is at NM 511 in Navajo Dam.

== Major intersections ==
County	Location	mi	km	Destinations	Notes
Rio Arriba	Navajo City	0.000	0.000	US 64	Southern terminus
San Juan	Navajo Dam	5.840	9.399	NM 511	Northern terminus
1.000 mi = 1.609 km; 1.000 km = 0.621 mi
