= New Mexico State Road 173 =

State highway in New Mexico, United States

State Road 173

Route information
- Maintained by NMDOT
- Length: 18.090 mi (29.113 km)

Major junctions
- West end: US 550 in Aztec
- East end: NM 511 near Navajo Dam

Location
- Country: United States
- State: New Mexico
- Counties: San Juan

Highway system
- New Mexico State Highway System; Interstate; US; State; Scenic
← NM 172	→ NM 174

State Road 173 (NM 173) is a 18.090-mile-long (29.113 km) state highway in the US state of New Mexico. Its western terminus is at U.S. Route 550 (US 550) in Aztec, and its eastern terminus at the end of state maintenance at the NM 511 west of Navajo Dam.

== Major intersections ==
The entire route is in San Juan County.

Location	mi	km	Destinations	Notes
Aztec	0.000	0.000	US 550	Western terminus
	4.257	6.851	NM 575 south	Northern terminus of NM 575
	18.090	29.113	NM 511	Eastern terminus
1.000 mi = 1.609 km; 1.000 km = 0.621 mi
