= Samuel Sandoval =

American Navajo World War II veteran (1923–2022)

Samuel F. Sandoval
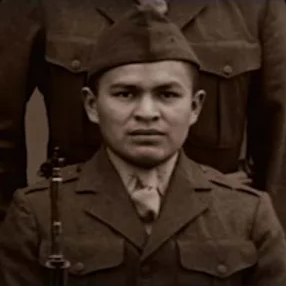
- Born: October 24, 1923; Nageezi, New Mexico, United States
- Died: July 29, 2022 (aged 98); Shiprock, New Mexico, United States
- Spouse: Malula Sandoval (m. 1990)
- Parents: Julian Sandoval, Jr.; Helen Smith

Samuel F. Sandoval (October 24, 1923 – July 29, 2022) was an American Navajo World War II veteran.

== Early life ==
Samuel Sandoval was born on October 24, 1923, to Julian Sandoval, Jr. and Helen Smith in Nageezi, New Mexico. He had eight siblings: Mabel Sandoval-Penn, Bert, Betsy, Nellie, Robert, Merril, Rodger, and Beulah.

== Honours ==
=== National honours ===
- United States
  - Navy Unit Commendation
  - Combat Action Ribbon
  - China Service Medal
  - World War II Victory Medal
  - Navy Occupation Service Medal with Asia Clasp
  - Asiatic–Pacific Campaign Medal with a silver star, in lieu of five bronze stars
