= Colorado State Highway 151 =

State highway in Colorado, United States

State Highway 151
- SH 151 highlighted in red

Route information
- Maintained by CDOT
- Length: 33.960 mi (54.653 km)

Major junctions
- West end: SH 172 at Ignacio
- East end: US 160 east of Chimney Rock

Location
- Country: United States
- State: Colorado
- Counties: Archuleta, La Plata

Highway system
- Colorado State Highway System; Interstate; US; State; Scenic
← SH 150	→ SH 157

State Highway 151 (SH 151) is a 33.960-mile-long (54.653 km) state highway in far southern Colorado. SH 151's western terminus is at SH 172 in Ignacio, and the eastern terminus is at U.S. Route 160 (US 160) east of Chimney Rock.

A large portion was washed away near Chimney Rock in October 2026.

== Route description ==
SH 151 begins in the west at its junction with SH 172 in Ignacio on the Southern Ute Indian Reservation. From there, the road proceeds generally eastward with a southern arc past Allison and through Arboles. The route then turns to the northeast passing near Navajo State Park and across the Piedra River. 25.7 mi (41.4 km) from its western end at Ignacio, SH 151 enters San Juan National Forest through which it continues to its eastern endpoint at US 160 roughly six miles east of Chimney Rock.

== Major intersections ==
County	Location	mi	km	Destinations	Notes
La Plata	Ignacio	0.000	0.000	SH 172	West end of route
Archuleta		33.960	54.653	US 160 – Pagosa Springs, Bayfield, Durango	East end of route
1.000 mi = 1.609 km; 1.000 km = 0.621 mi
