= Stollsteimer Creek =

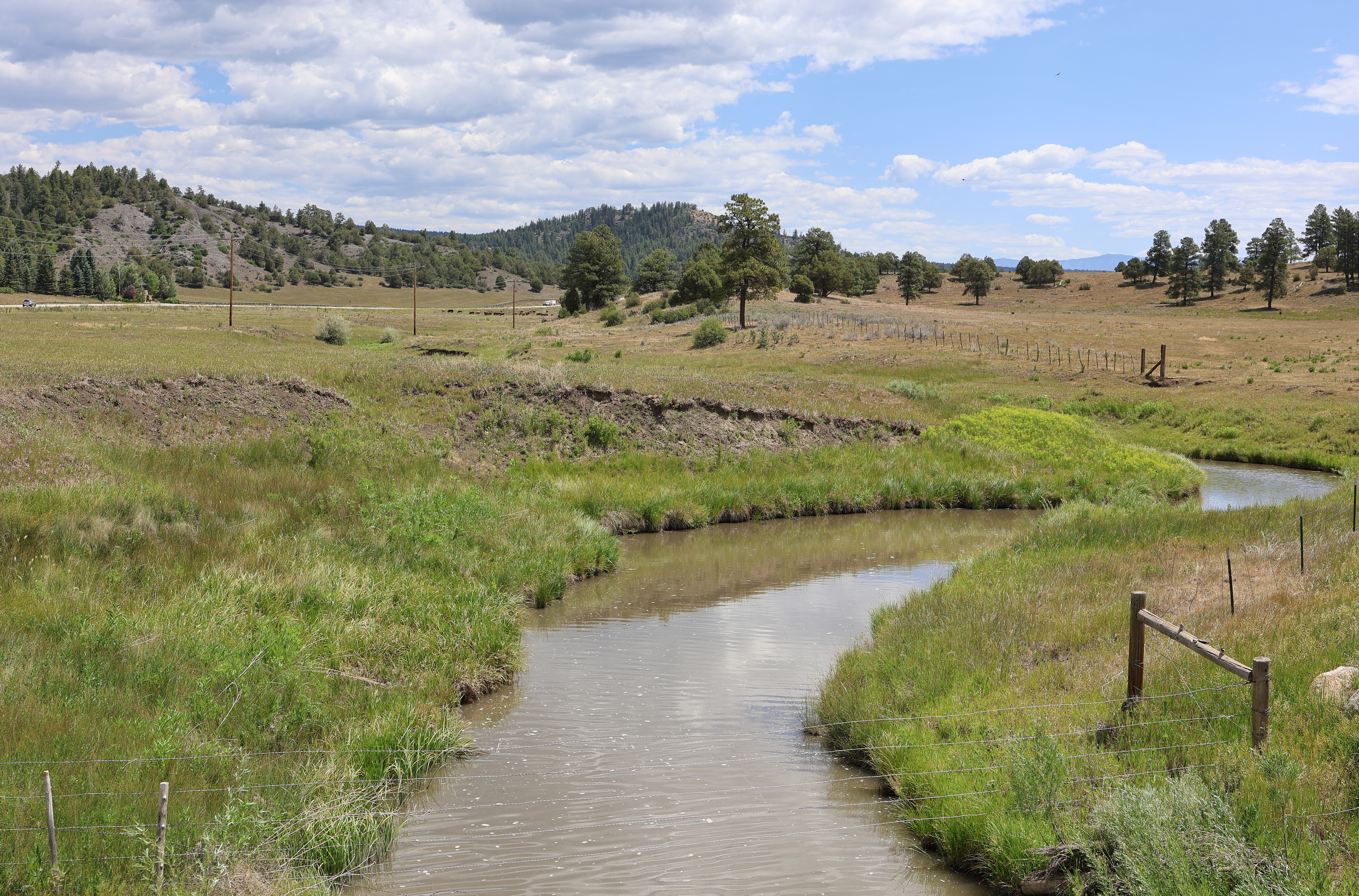
- The creek west of Pagosa Springs at Robbers Roost Road

- Location of the creek's mouth in southern Colorado, U.S.
- Etymology: Likely named for Christian Freiderich Stollsteimer (1842–1906) who lived at the now extinct town of Stollsteimer at the creek's mouth and worked as an Indian agent in the area

Physical characteristics
- Source
  - location: Archuleta County, Colorado
  - coordinates: 37°12′4.02″N 107°06′7.15″W
- Mouth
  - location: Piedra River
  - coordinates: 37°8′4.02″N 107°21′36.17″W
  - elevation: 6,260 feet (1,910 meters)
- Length: 54.9 kilometers (34.1 miles)
- Basin size: 82,000 acres (33,000 hectares)

Basin features
- Progression: Piedra → San Juan → Colorado
- Tributaries
  - left: Vega la Juana Creek; Archuleta Creek
  - right: Martinez Creek

Stollsteimer Creek is a tributary of the Piedra River in Archuleta County, Colorado.

== Course ==
The creek rises southwest of Pagosa Springs, Colorado in the San Juan National Forest, at a point north-northwest of Oak Brush Hill. From there, it flows generally north to a point just south of Highway 160. Next it flows generally west, staying just to the south of the highway. Near Capote Lake, the stream turns south and flows along the eastern shore of the lake. The lake is filled with water from the creek via a ditch on the lake's south side. Next the creek enters the Southern Ute Indian Reservation and flows south along Colorado State Highway 151 until its confluence with the Piedra River southwest of Chimney Rock National Monument.

== See also ==
- List of rivers of Colorado
