= Bloomfield Schools =

School district in New Mexico, United States

Bloomfield Schools (also known as the Bloomfield School District) is a public school district based in Bloomfield, New Mexico, United States. The district covers a 1,508-square-mile (3,910 km^{2}) area in eastern and southeastern San Juan County.

In addition to the majority of Bloomfield, the district also serves the communities of Angustura, Blanco, Nageezi, Turley, West Hammond, most of Navajo Dam, and a portion of Lee Acres. It also includes Huerfano.

== Schools ==
- Bloomfield High School
- Mesa Alta Junior High School
- Blanco Elementary School
- Naaba Ani Elementary School
- Central Primary School
- Charlie Y. Brown High School (Alternative)

== Enrollment ==
- 2007–2008 School Year: 3,187 students
- 2006–2007 School Year: 3,179 students
- 2005–2006 School Year: 3,191 students
- 2004–2005 School Year: 3,250 students
- 2003–2004 School Year: 3,178 students
- 2002–2003 School Year: 3,280 students
- 2001–2002 School Year: 3,214 students
- 2000–2001 School Year: 3,252 students

== Demographics ==
There were a total of 3,187 students enrolled in Bloomfield Schools during the 2007–2008 school year. The gender makeup of the district was 48.23% female and 51.77% male. The racial makeup of the district was 33.57% Hispanic, 33.04% White, 32.48% Native American, 0.56% African American, and 0.35% Asian/Pacific Islander.

== See also ==
- List of school districts in New Mexico
