= Center Point, New Mexico =

- Census-designated place
- Location within New Mexico Location within the United States
- Coordinates: 36°53′36″N 107°56′17″W
- Country: United States
- State: New Mexico
- County: San Juan

Area
  - Total: 9.59 sq mi (24.83 km^{2})
  - Land: 9.19 sq mi (23.81 km^{2})
  - Water: 0.39 sq mi (1.02 km^{2})
- Elevation: 5,742 ft (1,750 m)

Population (2020)
  - Total: 2,435
  - Density: 264.9/sq mi (102.27/km^{2})
- Time zone: UTC-7 (Mountain (MST))
  - Summer (DST): UTC-6 (MDT)
- ZIP Code: 87410 (Aztec)
- Area code: 575
- FIPS code: 35-13540
- GNIS feature ID: 2806749

Center Point is an unincorporated community and census-designated place (CDP) in San Juan County, New Mexico, United States. It was first listed as a CDP prior to the 2020 census. As of the 2020 census, Center Point had a population of 2,435.

The CDP is in the northeast part of the county, bordered to the south by the city of Aztec, the county seat, and to the northeast by Cedar Hill. It is in the valley of the Animas River, a southwest-flowing tributary of the San Juan River. U.S. Route 550 runs through the CDP, leading southwest 5 miles (8 km) to the center of Aztec and north 31 miles (50 km) to Durango, Colorado.

== Demographics ==
Historical population
Census	Pop.	Note	%±
2020	2,435		—
U.S. Decennial Census

=== 2020 census ===
As of the 2020 census, Center Point had a population of 2,435. The median age was 45.4 years. 20.6% of residents were under the age of 18 and 21.4% of residents were 65 years of age or older. For every 100 females there were 96.1 males, and for every 100 females age 18 and over there were 93.4 males age 18 and over.

35.6% of residents lived in urban areas, while 64.4% lived in rural areas.

There were 992 households in Center Point, of which 25.5% had children under the age of 18 living in them. Of all households, 51.9% were married-couple households, 21.9% were households with a male householder and no spouse or partner present, and 20.3% were households with a female householder and no spouse or partner present. About 26.9% of all households were made up of individuals and 12.3% had someone living alone who was 65 years of age or older.

There were 1,093 housing units, of which 9.2% were vacant. The homeowner vacancy rate was 2.1% and the rental vacancy rate was 2.8%.

Racial composition as of the 2020 census
Race	Number	Percent
White	1,961	80.5%
Black or African American	10	0.4%
American Indian and Alaska Native	101	4.1%
Asian	10	0.4%
Native Hawaiian and Other Pacific Islander	0	0.0%
Some other race	164	6.7%
Two or more races	189	7.8%
Hispanic or Latino (of any race)	454	18.6%

== Education ==
The school district is Aztec Municipal Schools. Aztec High School is the local high school.
