= Lee Acres, New Mexico =

- Census-designated place
- Location within New Mexico
- Coordinates: 36°42′59″N 108°04′03″W
- Country: United States
- State: New Mexico
- County: San Juan

Area
  - Total: 10.49 sq mi (27.16 km^{2})
  - Land: 10.32 sq mi (26.74 km^{2})
  - Water: 0.16 sq mi (0.42 km^{2})
- Elevation: 5,492 ft (1,674 m)

Population (2020)
  - Total: 4,170
  - Density: 404.0/sq mi (155.97/km^{2})
- Time zone: UTC-7 (Mountain (MST))
  - Summer (DST): UTC-6 (MDT)
- GNIS feature ID: 2584139

Lee Acres is a census-designated place in San Juan County, New Mexico, United States. As of the 2020 census, Lee Acres had a population of 4,170. It is located on U.S. Route 64 between Farmington and Bloomfield.

== Demographics ==
Historical population
Census	Pop.	Note	%±
2020	4,170		—
U.S. Decennial Census

=== 2020 census ===
As of the 2020 census, Lee Acres had a population of 4,170. The median age was 38.0 years. 25.5% of residents were under the age of 18 and 17.0% were 65 years of age or older. For every 100 females there were 97.4 males, and for every 100 females age 18 and over there were 95.7 males age 18 and over.

65.0% of residents lived in urban areas, while 35.0% lived in rural areas.

There were 1,502 households in Lee Acres, of which 33.9% had children under the age of 18 living in them. Of all households, 50.3% were married-couple households, 19.8% were households with a male householder and no spouse or partner present, and 21.3% were households with a female householder and no spouse or partner present. About 22.3% of all households were made up of individuals and 8.8% had someone living alone who was 65 years of age or older.

There were 1,772 housing units, of which 15.2% were vacant. The homeowner vacancy rate was 2.0% and the rental vacancy rate was 20.9%.

Racial composition as of the 2020 census
Race	Number	Percent
White	2,176	52.2%
Black or African American	49	1.2%
American Indian and Alaska Native	702	16.8%
Asian	5	0.1%
Native Hawaiian and Other Pacific Islander	1	0.0%
Some other race	719	17.2%
Two or more races	518	12.4%
Hispanic or Latino (of any race)	1,520	36.5%

== Education ==
Most of Lee Acres is in Farmington Municipal Schools while a portion is in Bloomfield Schools. Bloomfield High School is the local high school of the latter.
