= Sanostee, New Mexico =

Sanostee, New Mexico Tséʼałnáoztʼiʼí (Navajo)
- CDP
- Location of Sanostee, New Mexico

- Location in the United States
- Coordinates: 36°26′02″N 108°52′42″W
- Country: United States
- State: New Mexico
- County: San Juan

Area
  - Total: 4.54 sq mi (11.75 km^{2})
  - Land: 4.54 sq mi (11.75 km^{2})
  - Water: 0.0039 sq mi (0.01 km^{2})
- Elevation: 5,939 ft (1,810 m)

Population (2020)
  - Total: 322
  - Density: 71.0/sq mi (27.41/km^{2})
- Time zone: UTC-7 (Mountain (MST))
  - Summer (DST): UTC-6 (MDT)
- ZIP code: 87461
- Area code: 505
- FIPS code: 35-69620
- GNIS feature ID: 2409274

Sanostee is a census-designated place (CDP) in San Juan County, New Mexico, United States. As of the 2020 census, Sanostee had a population of 322. It is part of the Farmington Metropolitan Statistical Area.

== Geography ==
According to the United States Census Bureau, the CDP has a total area of 4.5 square miles (12 km^{2}), of which 4.5 square miles (12 km^{2}) is land and 0.22% is water.

== Demographics ==
Historical population
Census	Pop.	Note	%±
2020	322		—
U.S. Decennial Census

As of the census of 2000, there were 429 people, 107 households, and 94 families residing in the CDP. The population density was 95.4 inhabitants per square mile (36.8/km^{2}). There were 156 housing units at an average density of 34.7 per square mile (13.4/km^{2}). The racial makeup of the CDP was 99.53% Native American, 0.23% White, 0.23% from other races, Hispanic or Latino of any race were 0.93% of the population.

There were 107 households, out of which 55.1% had children under the age of 18 living with them, 47.7% were married couples living together, 27.1% had a female householder with no husband present, and 12.1% were non-families. 10.3% of all households were made up of individuals, and 3.7% had someone living alone who was 65 years of age or older. The average household size was 4.01 and the average family size was 4.31.

In the CDP, the population was spread out, with 42.2% under the age of 18, 10.5% from 18 to 24, 24.5% from 25 to 44, 16.8% from 45 to 64, and 6.1% who were 65 years of age or older. The median age was 21 years. For every 100 females, there were 105.3 males. For every 100 females age 18 and over, there were 90.8 males.

The median income for a household in the CDP was $22,212, and the median income for a family was $22,604. Males had a median income of $19,667 versus $12,188 for females. The per capita income for the CDP was $5,926. About 38.5% of families and 47.5% of the population were below the poverty line, including 53.4% of those under age 18 and 26.7% of those age 65 or over.

== Education ==
Central Consolidated Schools serves Sanostee as well as other communities in western San Juan County.
