= Spencerville, New Mexico =

- Census-designated place
- Location within New Mexico
- Coordinates: 36°49′28″N 108°03′23″W
- Country: United States
- State: New Mexico
- County: San Juan

Area
  - Total: 5.31 sq mi (13.74 km^{2})
  - Land: 5.25 sq mi (13.61 km^{2})
  - Water: 0.050 sq mi (0.13 km^{2})
- Elevation: 5,788 ft (1,764 m)

Population (2020)
  - Total: 1,138
  - Density: 216.6/sq mi (83.62/km^{2})
- Time zone: UTC-7 (Mountain (MST))
  - Summer (DST): UTC-6 (MDT)
- GNIS feature ID: 2584220

Spencerville is a census-designated place in San Juan County, New Mexico, United States. As of the 2020 census, Spencerville had a population of 1,138.

== Geography ==
According to the United States Census Bureau, Spencerville has a total area of 8.64 square kilometers, all land.

== Demographics ==
Historical population
Census	Pop.	Note	%±
2020	1,138		—
U.S. Decennial Census

According to the 2010 census, 1,258 people were living in Spencerville. The population density was 145.6 inhabitants per square kilometer. Of the 1,258 inhabitants, Spencerville was composed by 83.23% White, 0.56% were African American, 5.64% were Native American, 0.16% were Asian, 0% were Pacific Islanders, 6.36% were of other races and 4.05% from two or more races. Of the total population 19.87% were Hispanic or Latino of any race.

== Education ==
It is divided between Aztec Municipal Schools (the majority) and Farmington Municipal Schools (a minority section). Aztec High School is the local high school of the former.
