= Navajo City, New Mexico =

Unincorporated community in New Mexico, US

Coordinates: 36°45′07″N 107°36′08″W

Navajo City is an unincorporated community in Rio Arriba County, New Mexico, United States, just north and east, of the Navajo Nation in the northwestern part of the state.

Housing for workers was set up during the construction of Navajo Dam in the early 1960s at the junction of the Los Pinos and the San Juan Rivers. At the intersection of U.S. Route 64 and New Mexico State Road 539 the settlement is on the south side of Martinez Mesa to the south of the lake. Today there is little left and economic activity has shifted to the community of Navajo Dam, in San Juan County.

== History ==
Navajos had settled in this area as early as 1630. The Hubbell family had a trading post here between 1880 and 1882.
