= North Light Plant, New Mexico =

- Census-designated place
- Location within New Mexico
- Coordinates: 36°52′21″N 108°02′20″W
- Country: United States
- State: New Mexico
- County: San Juan

Area
  - Total: 2.16 sq mi (5.60 km^{2})
  - Land: 2.16 sq mi (5.60 km^{2})
  - Water: 0 sq mi (0.00 km^{2})
- Elevation: 5,883 ft (1,793 m)

Population (2020)
  - Total: 556
  - Density: 257/sq mi (99.3/km^{2})
- Time zone: UTC-7 (Mountain (MST))
  - Summer (DST): UTC-6 (MDT)
- Area code: 505
- GNIS feature ID: 2584166

North Light Plant is an unincorporated community and census-designated place in San Juan County, New Mexico, United States. As of the 2020 census, North Light Plant had a population of 556. New Mexico State Road 574 passes through the community.

== Geography ==
According to the U.S. Census Bureau, the community has an area of 0.694 square miles (1.80 km^{2}), all land.

== Demographics ==
Historical population
Census	Pop.	Note	%±
2020	556		—
U.S. Decennial Census

== Education ==
It is divided between Aztec Municipal Schools (the majority) and Farmington Municipal Schools (a minority section). Aztec High School is the local high school of the former.
