= Huerfano, New Mexico =

Huerfano, New Mexico Hanáádlį́ (Navajo)
- CDP
- Location of Huerfano, New Mexico

- Location in the United States
- Coordinates: 36°31′43″N 108°01′45″W
- Country: United States
- State: New Mexico
- County: San Juan

Area
  - Total: 26.8 sq mi (69.5 km^{2})
  - Land: 26.8 sq mi (69.5 km^{2})
  - Water: 0 sq mi (0.0 km^{2})
- Elevation: 6,152 ft (1,875 m)

Population (2000)
  - Total: 104
  - Density: 3.9/sq mi (1.5/km^{2})
- Time zone: UTC-7 (Mountain (MST))
  - Summer (DST): UTC-6 (MDT)
- Area code: 505
- FIPS code: 35-33762
- GNIS feature ID: 2408405

Huerfano (Navajo: Hanáádlį́) is a census-designated place (CDP) in San Juan County, New Mexico, United States. The population was 104 at the 2000 census. It is part of the Farmington Metropolitan Statistical Area. Huerfano is named after El Huerfano Mountain, located a mile to the northeast.

== Geography ==
According to the United States Census Bureau, the CDP has a total area of 26.9 square miles (70 km^{2}), all land.

== Demographics ==
As of the census of 2000, there were 104 people, 28 households, and 22 families residing in the CDP. The population density was 3.9 inhabitants per square mile (1.5/km^{2}). There were 36 housing units at an average density of 1.3 per square mile (0.50/km^{2}). The racial makeup of the CDP was 99.04% Native American and 0.96% White.

There were 28 households, out of which 39.3% had children under the age of 18 living with them, 57.1% were married couples living together, 17.9% had a female householder with no husband present, and 21.4% were non-families. 14.3% of all households were made up of individuals, and none had someone living alone who was 65 years of age or older. The average household size was 3.71 and the average family size was 4.32.

In the CDP, the population was spread out, with 38.5% under the age of 18, 7.7% from 18 to 24, 25.0% from 25 to 44, 20.2% from 45 to 64, and 8.7% who were 65 years of age or older. The median age was 30 years. For every 100 females, there were 85.7 males. For every 100 females age 18 and over, there were 82.9 males.

The median income for a household in the CDP was $24,583, and the median income for a family was $24,583. Males had a median income of $18,750 versus $13,750 for females. The per capita income for the CDP was $7,333. None of the population is below the poverty line.

== Education ==
The community of Huerfano is part of the Bloomfield School District. Bloomfield High School is the local high school.
