= Totah Vista, New Mexico =

- Census-designated place
- Location within New Mexico Location within the United States
- Coordinates: 36°42′44″N 108°12′9″W
- Country: United States
- State: New Mexico
- County: San Juan

Area
  - Total: 0.58 sq mi (1.50 km^{2})
  - Land: 0.57 sq mi (1.48 km^{2})
  - Water: 0.0077 sq mi (0.02 km^{2})
- Elevation: 5,282 ft (1,610 m)

Population (2020)
  - Total: 288
  - Density: 503.1/sq mi (194.25/km^{2})
- Time zone: UTC-7 (Mountain (MST))
  - Summer (DST): UTC-6 (MDT)
- ZIP Code: 87401 (Farmington)
- Area code: 505
- FIPS code: 35-79264
- GNIS feature ID: 2806755

Totah Vista is an unincorporated community and census-designated place (CDP) in San Juan County, New Mexico, United States. As of the 2020 census, Totah Vista had a population of 288. It was first listed as a CDP prior to the 2020 census.

The CDP is in the northern part of the county, on the north side of the San Juan River. It is bordered to the north by Farmington, the largest city in the county.

== Demographics ==
Historical population
Census	Pop.	Note	%±
2020	288		—
U.S. Decennial Census

== Education ==
Its school district is Farmington Municipal Schools.
