= Ojo Amarillo, New Mexico =

Ojo Amarillo, New Mexico Tó Łitsooí (Navajo)
- CDP
- Location of Ojo Amarillo, New Mexico

- Location in the United States
- Coordinates: 36°41′37″N 108°22′25″W
- Country: United States
- State: New Mexico
- County: San Juan

Area
  - Total: 1.97 sq mi (5.09 km^{2})
  - Land: 1.97 sq mi (5.09 km^{2})
  - Water: 0 sq mi (0.00 km^{2})
- Elevation: 5,407 ft (1,648 m)

Population (2020)
  - Total: 696
  - Density: 354.3/sq mi (136.79/km^{2})
- Time zone: UTC-7 (Mountain (MST))
  - Summer (DST): UTC-6 (MDT)
- Area code: 505
- FIPS code: 35-53485
- GNIS feature ID: 2408981

Ojo Amarillo (Navajo: Tó Łitsooí) is a census-designated place (CDP) in San Juan County, New Mexico, United States. As of the 2020 census, Ojo Amarillo had a population of 696. It is part of the Farmington Metropolitan Statistical Area.

== Geography ==
According to the United States Census Bureau, the CDP has a total area of 1.9 square miles (4.9 km^{2}), all land.

== Demographics ==
Historical population
Census	Pop.	Note	%±
2020	696		—
U.S. Decennial Census

As of the census of 2000, there were 829 people, 174 households, and 163 families residing in the CDP. The population density was 434.8 inhabitants per square mile (167.9/km^{2}). There were 193 housing units at an average density of 101.2 per square mile (39.1/km^{2}). The racial makeup of the CDP was 95.54% Native American, 1.57% White, 0.12% African American, 0.48% from other races, and 2.29% from two or more races. Hispanic or Latino of any race were 1.33% of the population.

There were 174 households, out of which 72.4% had children under the age of 18 living with them, 50.0% were married couples living together, 34.5% had a female householder with no husband present, and 6.3% were non-families. 4.6% of all households were made up of individuals, and 0.6% had someone living alone who was 65 years of age or older. The average household size was 4.76 and the average family size was 4.84.

In the CDP, the population was spread out, with 49.3% under the age of 18, 11.3% from 18 to 24, 25.3% from 25 to 44, 12.9% from 45 to 64, and 1.1% who were 65 years of age or older. The median age was 18 years. For every 100 females, there were 94.1 males. For every 100 females age 18 and over, there were 85.0 males.

The median income for a household in the CDP was $30,662, and the median income for a family was $24,356. Males had a median income of $32,000 versus $11,458 for females. The per capita income for the CDP was $5,661. About 39.1% of families and 36.1% of the population were below the poverty line, including 37.1% of those under age 18 and 71.4% of those age 65 or over.

== Education ==
Central Consolidated Schools serves Ojo Amarillo as well as other communities in western San Juan County.
