= Napi Headquarters, New Mexico =

- CDP
- Location within the state of New Mexico Napi Headquarters, New Mexico (the United States)
- Coordinates: 36°39′02″N 108°12′52″W
- Country: United States
- State: New Mexico
- County: San Juan

Area
  - Total: 4.45 sq mi (11.53 km^{2})
  - Land: 4.45 sq mi (11.53 km^{2})
  - Water: 0 sq mi (0.00 km^{2})
- Elevation: 6,044 ft (1,842 m)

Population (2020)
  - Total: 758
  - Density: 170.3/sq mi (65.76/km^{2})
- Time zone: UTC-7 (Mountain (MST))
  - Summer (DST): UTC-6 (MDT)
- Area code: 505
- FIPS code: 35-51035
- GNIS feature ID: 2408900

Napi Headquarters is a census-designated place (CDP) in San Juan County, New Mexico, United States. As of the 2020 census, Napi Headquarters had a population of 758.

== Geography ==
According to the United States Census Bureau, the CDP has a total area of 3.3 square miles (8.5 km^{2}), all land.

== Demographics ==
Historical population
Census	Pop.	Note	%±
2020	758		—
U.S. Decennial Census

As of the census of 2000, there were 706 people, 160 households, and 148 families residing in the CDP. The population density was 214.3 inhabitants per square mile (82.7/km^{2}). There were 187 housing units at an average density of 56.8 per square mile (21.9/km^{2}). The racial makeup of the CDP was 1.70% White, 0.14% African American, 97.31% Native American, 0.14% from other races, and 0.71% from two or more races. Hispanic or Latino of any race were 2.97% of the population.

There were 160 households, out of which 74.4% had children under the age of 18 living with them, 44.4% were married couples living together, 38.1% had a female householder with no husband present, and 7.5% were non-families. 5.6% of all households were made up of individuals, and 0.6% had someone living alone who was 65 years of age or older. The average household size was 4.41 and the average family size was 4.47.

In the CDP, the population was spread out, with 50.7% under the age of 18, 7.9% from 18 to 24, 30.2% from 25 to 44, 9.1% from 45 to 64, and 2.1% who were 65 years of age or older. The median age was 18 years. For every 100 females, there were 86.3 males. For every 100 females age 18 and over, there were 76.6 males.

The median income for a household in the CDP was $15,875, and the median income for a family was $20,069. Males had a median income of $28,750 versus $12,955 for females. The per capita income for the CDP was $6,335. About 46.1% of families and 48.6% of the population were below the poverty line, including 55.2% of those under age 18 and 100.0% of those age 65 or over.

== Education ==
The community of Napi Headquarters is served by Farmington Municipal Schools.
