= New Mexico State Road 538 =

State highway in New Mexico, United States

State Road 538
- NM 538 highlighted in red

Route information
- Maintained by NMDOT
- Length: 1.510 mi (2.430 km)

Major junctions
- South end: US 87 in Clayton
- North end: US 56 / US 64 / US 412 in Clayton

Location
- Country: United States
- State: New Mexico
- Counties: Union

Highway system
- New Mexico State Highway System; Interstate; US; State; Scenic
← NM 537	→ NM 539

State Road 538 (NM 538) is a 1.5-mile-long (2.4 km) state highway in the US state of New Mexico. NM 538's southern terminus is at U.S. Route 87 (US 87) in Clayton, and the northern terminus is at US 56/US 64/US 412 in Clayton.

== Major intersections ==
The entire route is in Clayton, Union County.

mi	km	Destinations	Notes
0.000	0.000	US 87	Southern terminus
1.510	2.430	US 56 / US 64 / US 412	Northern terminus
1.000 mi = 1.609 km; 1.000 km = 0.621 mi
