= West Hammond, New Mexico =

- Census-designated place
- Location within New Mexico
- Coordinates: 36°40′53″N 108°01′30″W
- Country: United States
- State: New Mexico
- County: San Juan

Area
  - Total: 9.19 sq mi (23.79 km^{2})
  - Land: 9.10 sq mi (23.58 km^{2})
  - Water: 0.077 sq mi (0.20 km^{2})
- Elevation: 5,414 ft (1,650 m)

Population (2020)
  - Total: 2,724
  - Density: 299/sq mi (115.5/km^{2})
- Time zone: UTC-7 (Mountain (MST))
  - Summer (DST): UTC-6 (MDT)
- GNIS feature ID: 2584236

West Hammond is a census-designated place in San Juan County, New Mexico, United States. As of the 2020 census, West Hammond had a population of 2,724.

== Geography ==
According to the United States Census Bureau, West Hammond has a total area of 19.53 square kilometers, of which 19.33 km^{2} is land and (1.02%) 0.2 km^{2} is water.

== Demographics ==
Historical population
Census	Pop.	Note	%±
2020	2,724		—
U.S. Decennial Census

=== 2020 census ===
As of the 2020 census, West Hammond had a population of 2,724. The median age was 39.4 years. 25.8% of residents were under the age of 18 and 17.2% of residents were 65 years of age or older. For every 100 females there were 98.5 males, and for every 100 females age 18 and over there were 98.0 males age 18 and over.

5.5% of residents lived in urban areas, while 94.5% lived in rural areas.

There were 992 households in West Hammond, of which 32.9% had children under the age of 18 living in them. Of all households, 56.3% were married-couple households, 17.2% were households with a male householder and no spouse or partner present, and 19.7% were households with a female householder and no spouse or partner present. About 19.8% of all households were made up of individuals and 8.4% had someone living alone who was 65 years of age or older.

There were 1,091 housing units, of which 9.1% were vacant. The homeowner vacancy rate was 0.7% and the rental vacancy rate was 10.4%.

Racial composition as of the 2020 census
Race	Number	Percent
White	1,549	56.9%
Black or African American	15	0.6%
American Indian and Alaska Native	396	14.5%
Asian	10	0.4%
Native Hawaiian and Other Pacific Islander	2	0.1%
Some other race	399	14.6%
Two or more races	353	13.0%
Hispanic or Latino (of any race)	891	32.7%

=== 2010 census ===
According to the 2010 census, 2,790 people were living in West Hammond. The population density was 142.87 inhabitants per square kilometer. Of the 2,790 inhabitants, West Hammond was composed by 72.83% White, 0.79% were African American, 14.3% were Native American, 0.07% were Asian, 0% were Pacific Islanders, 8.71% were of other races and 3.3% from two or more races. Of the total population 26.16% were Hispanic or Latino of any race.

== Education ==
The area school district is Bloomfield Schools. Bloomfield High School is the local high school.
