= Turley, New Mexico =

- Census-designated place
- Location within New Mexico Location within the United States
- Coordinates: 36°45′15″N 107°46′06″W
- Country: United States
- State: New Mexico
- County: San Juan

Area
  - Total: 4.83 sq mi (12.50 km^{2})
  - Land: 4.63 sq mi (11.99 km^{2})
  - Water: 0.20 sq mi (0.51 km^{2})
- Elevation: 5,735 ft (1,748 m)

Population (2020)
  - Total: 218
  - Density: 47.1/sq mi (18.19/km^{2})
- Time zone: UTC-7 (Mountain (MST))
  - Summer (DST): UTC-6 (MDT)
- ZIP Code: 87412 (Blanco)
- Area code: 505
- FIPS code: 35-80120
- GNIS feature ID: 2806756

Turley is an unincorporated community and census-designated place (CDP) in San Juan County, New Mexico, United States. It was first listed as a CDP prior to the 2020 census. As of the 2020 census, Turley had a population of 218.

The CDP is in the northeast part of the county, on the southeast side of the San Juan River. To the northwest, across the river, is the community of Blanco. U.S. Route 64 passes through Turley, leading west 10 miles (16 km) to Bloomfield and east 60 miles (97 km) to Dulce.

== Demographics ==
Historical population
Census	Pop.	Note	%±
2020	218		—
U.S. Decennial Census

== Education ==
The area school district is Bloomfield Schools. Bloomfield High School is the local high school.
