= Bloomfield High School (New Mexico) =

Coordinates: 36°42′59″N 107°58′39″W

Location
- 520 N. First St; Bloomfield, New Mexico 87413; United States

Information
- Type: Public High School
- Established: 1956
- Teaching staff: 45.89 (FTE)
- Grades: 9-12
- Enrollment: 764 (2024–2025)
- Student to teacher ratio: 16.65
- Colors: Blue, Gold
- Athletics: NMAA; District 1-AAA
- Mascot: Bobcat
- Website: bfsdbhs.ss19.sharpschool.com

Bloomfield High School is a school located in Bloomfield, New Mexico. The high school's attendance area covers the town and communities south and east of Bloomfield along US 550 and US 64. The high school is currently undergoing renovations that will cover several years which will replace old classroom buildings with new ones. The school's colors are Blue and Gold and the mascot is the Bobcat.

In addition to the majority of Bloomfield, the district also serves the communities of Angustura, Blanco, Nageezi, Turley, West Hammond, most of Navajo Dam, and a portion of Lee Acres. It also includes Huerfano.

== History ==
BHS originally opened in August 1956 as a junior-senior high school, with 7th to 10th grade students. The 10th grade students would eventually become the 1st senior class of 1960. It was formed out of the junior high school. Previously, the high school students went to nearby Aztec High School in Aztec, New Mexico.

== Athletics and activities ==
State Championships

Sport	Class	Year(s)
Baseball	3A	2010
Cross Country, Girls	3A	1991
Football	B	1966, 2023
Softball	3A	1991, 1992, 1993, 2000, 2007, 2008, 2009, 2010
Track, Boys	3A	1988, 1989, 1993, 1994
Track, Girls	3A	1997
Wrestling	3A	1984, 2014
