= Flora Vista, New Mexico =

- CDP
- Location of Flora Vista, New Mexico

- Location in the United States
- Coordinates: 36°48′11″N 108°06′25″W
- Country: United States
- State: New Mexico
- County: San Juan

Area
  - Total: 5.05 sq mi (13.07 km^{2})
  - Land: 4.95 sq mi (12.83 km^{2})
  - Water: 0.093 sq mi (0.24 km^{2})
- Elevation: 5,581 ft (1,701 m)

Population (2020)
  - Total: 2,048
  - Density: 413.5/sq mi (159.67/km^{2})
- Time zone: UTC-7 (Mountain (MST))
  - Summer (DST): UTC-6 (MDT)
- ZIP code: 87415
- Area code: 505
- FIPS code: 35-26360
- GNIS feature ID: 2408216

Flora Vista is a census-designated place (CDP) in San Juan County, New Mexico, United States. As of the 2020 census, Flora Vista had a population of 2,048. It is part of the Farmington Metropolitan Statistical Area. Flora Vista was founded in 1877 by settlers from Colorado who built cabins along the Animas River. A post office was established the following year. The name derived from the view of wildflowers in the valley.

== Geography ==
According to the United States Census Bureau, the CDP has a total area of 2.1 square miles (5.4 km^{2}), of which 2.0 square miles (5.2 km^{2}) is land and 0.04 square miles (0.10 km^{2}) (1.93%) is water.

== Demographics ==
Historical population
Census	Pop.	Note	%±
2000	1,383		—
2020	2,048		—
U.S. Decennial Census

=== 2020 census ===
As of the 2020 census, Flora Vista had a population of 2,048. The median age was 42.1 years. 23.5% of residents were under the age of 18 and 20.6% of residents were 65 years of age or older. For every 100 females there were 101.0 males, and for every 100 females age 18 and over there were 101.8 males age 18 and over.

85.5% of residents lived in urban areas, while 14.5% lived in rural areas.

There were 772 households in Flora Vista, of which 29.7% had children under the age of 18 living in them. Of all households, 54.8% were married-couple households, 19.0% were households with a male householder and no spouse or partner present, and 19.2% were households with a female householder and no spouse or partner present. About 23.1% of all households were made up of individuals and 9.2% had someone living alone who was 65 years of age or older.

There were 916 housing units, of which 15.7% were vacant. The homeowner vacancy rate was 2.5% and the rental vacancy rate was 21.6%.

Racial composition as of the 2020 census
Race	Number	Percent
White	1,472	71.9%
Black or African American	5	0.2%
American Indian and Alaska Native	130	6.3%
Asian	5	0.2%
Native Hawaiian and Other Pacific Islander	2	0.1%
Some other race	168	8.2%
Two or more races	266	13.0%
Hispanic or Latino (of any race)	460	22.5%

=== 2000 census ===
As of the census of 2000, there were 1,383 people, 504 households, and 406 families residing in the CDP. The population density was 679.8 inhabitants per square mile (262.5/km^{2}). There were 537 housing units at an average density of 264.0 per square mile (101.9/km^{2}). The racial makeup of the CDP was 87.13% White, 0.29% African American, 3.33% Native American, 0.14% Asian, 5.21% from other races, and 3.90% from two or more races. Hispanic or Latino of any race were 17.79% of the population.

There were 504 households, out of which 33.5% had children under the age of 18 living with them, 68.3% were married couples living together, 8.3% had a female householder with no husband present, and 19.4% were non-families. 15.1% of all households were made up of individuals, and 5.4% had someone living alone who was 65 years of age or older. The average household size was 2.74 and the average family size was 3.03.

In the CDP the population was spread out, with 26.4% under the age of 18, 7.8% from 18 to 24, 23.7% from 25 to 44, 28.6% from 45 to 64, and 13.4% who were 65 years of age or older. The median age was 40 years. For every 100 females there were 102.2 males. For every 100 females age 18 and over, there were 102.0 males.

The median income for a household in the CDP was $46,157, and the median income for a family was $46,071. Males had a median income of $40,481 versus $20,125 for females. The per capita income for the CDP was $20,189. About 8.1% of families and 12.1% of the population were below the poverty line, including 14.6% of those under age 18 and 9.8% of those age 65 or over.

== Education ==
Flora Vista is served by two public school districts – Aztec and Farmington. Aztec High School is the local high school of the former.

== See also ==
- List of census-designated places in New Mexico
