= Aztec High School =

Public high school in Aztec, New Mexico, United States

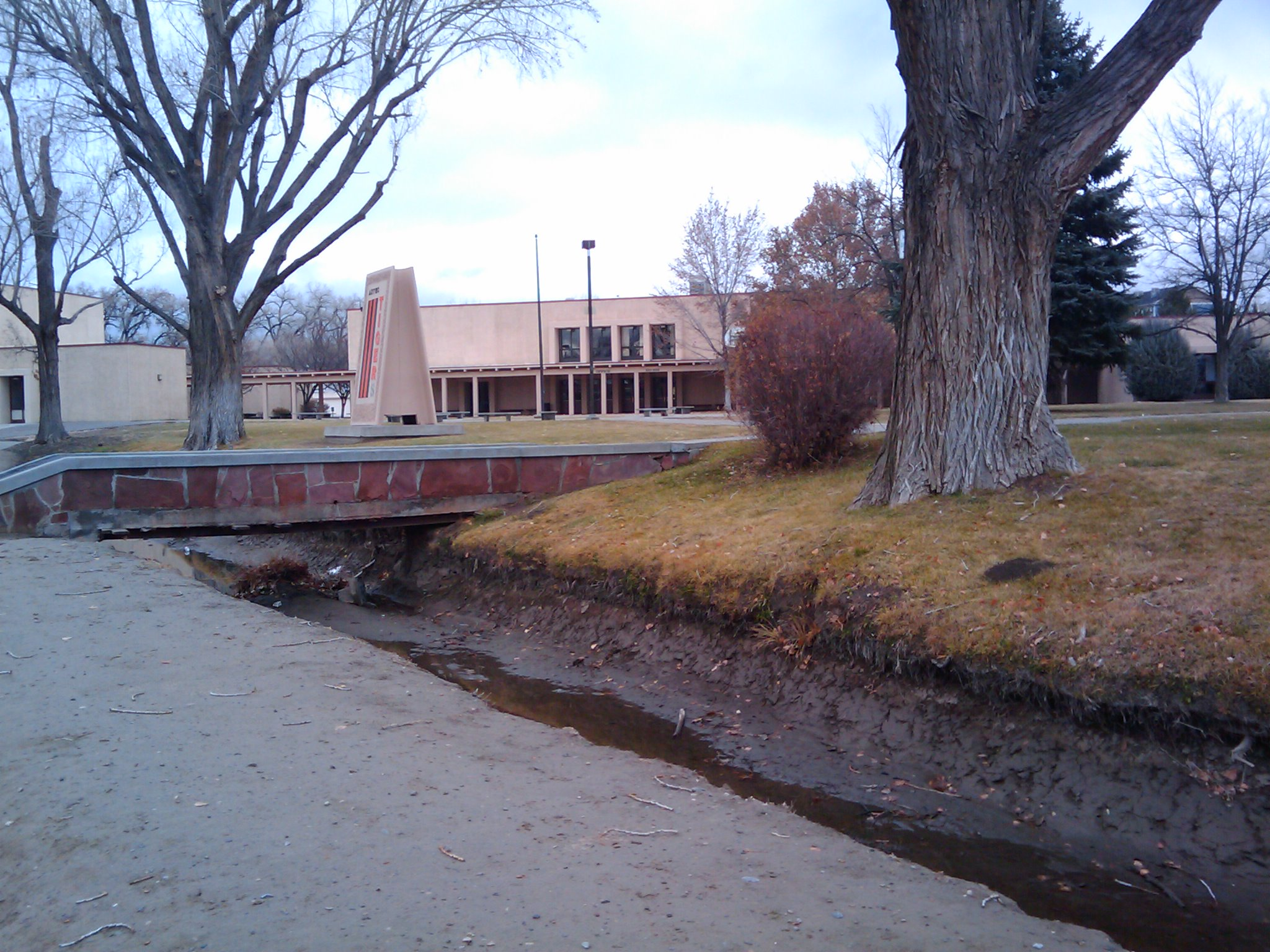
- Aztec High School in 2008

Location
- 500 E Chaco St. Aztec, New Mexico 87410; United States; 36°49′15″N 107°59′26″W

Information
- Type: Public High School
- Motto: Home of The Fighting Tigers
- NCES School ID: 350015000135
- Teaching staff: 39.27 (FTE)
- Grades: 9-12
- Enrollment: 692 (2023-2024)
- Student to teacher ratio: 17.62
- Campus: 9.4-acre (0.038 km^{2}) Town Fringe
- Colors: Black & orange
- Athletics: NMAA; District 1-AAAAA
- Mascot: Tiger
- Website: www.aztecschools.com/o/ahs/

Aztec High School is a public high school in Aztec, New Mexico. The school colors are black and orange and the mascot is the Fighting Tiger.

In addition to Aztec, the district (and effectively the high school) also serves northern Bloomfield and the communities of Cedar Hill, Center Point, and La Boca. The district also includes most of Flora Vista, North Light Plant, and Spencerville, as well as portions of Crouch Mesa and Navajo Dam.

== History ==
Until 1956, students from Bloomfield went to Aztec. In 1956 Bloomfield High School formed out of the town's junior high school.

== School environment ==
According to the Department of Education, in 2013, Aztec's student body was measured at 26% Hispanic and almost 20% Native American. In 2017 there were approximately 900 students enrolled at the school.

== 2017 shooting and lawsuits ==
On the morning of December 7, 2017, the San Juan County Sheriff's Department said they were responding to an active shooter on campus. The New Mexico State Police Twitter account confirmed that two students were killed by the gunman, a former student, who then killed himself.

A lawsuit was filed against Aztec schools and police after the shooting, claiming administrators failed to heed the advice of a 2013 school security assessment which recommended securing the school perimeter with new infrastructure improvements such as fencing and a funneled entrance. The lawsuit claimed the security assessment was dismissed by the superintendent and a board member as a risk that was "simply too remote" to support funding security enhancements.

The mother of Casey Marquez, one of the victims of the shooting, filed a civil rights lawsuit against the school for sexual misconduct against Marquez before her death. According to the lawsuit, the accused teacher, James Dee Coulter, had resigned from the district, claiming he had anxiety over the shooting. However this came after he had admitted to school personnel that Marquez had been on the second floor, where she was killed, to leave her personal belongings in the teacher's classroom though she did not have a class with him.

Allegations towards Coulter had been made in 2014, and continued until he resigned after the shooting. A separate student accused Coulter of similar misconduct, and he admitted to several more. He pleaded guilty to one count of fourth degree-felony criminal sexual contact as part of a plea agreement and was sentenced January 31, 2020 to a lifetime on the sex offender registry, and released the same day.

Previously a teacher at the school had been investigated in 2016 for having a sexual relationship with a male student.

== Notable alumni ==
- Mike Everitt, MLB umpire
- Larry Harlow, MLB outfielder
- T. Ryan Lane, member of the New Mexico House of Representatives
- Steve D. Lanier, member of the New Mexico Senate
