= San Juan County, New Mexico =

County in New Mexico, United States

- County
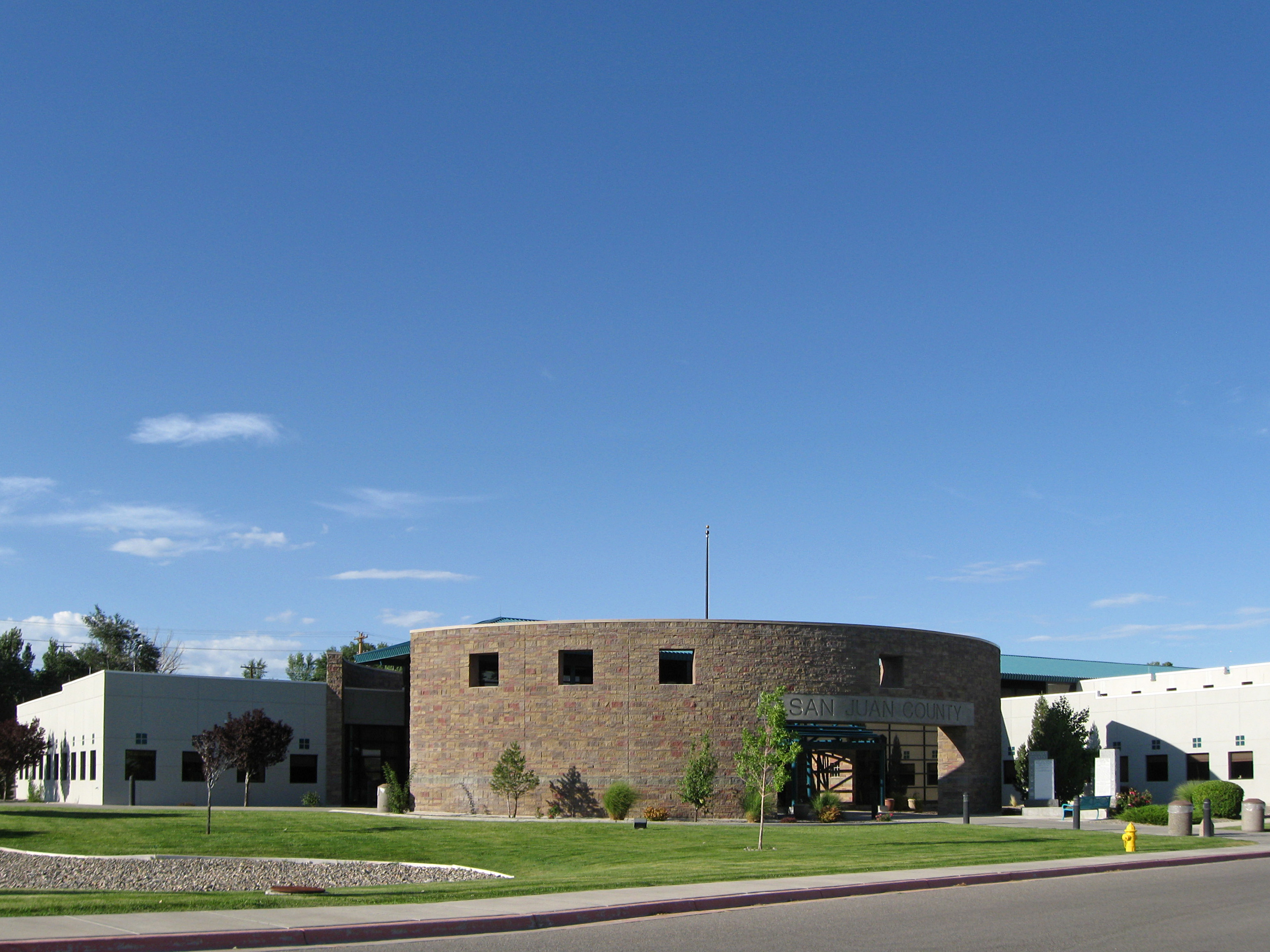
- San Juan County Administration Building in Aztec

- Seal

- Location within the U.S. state of New Mexico
- Coordinates: 36°31′N 108°19′W
- Country: United States
- State: New Mexico
- Founded: February 24, 1887
- Named for: San Juan River
- Seat: Aztec
- Largest city: Farmington

Area
  - Total: 5,538 sq mi (14,340 km^{2})
  - Land: 5,513 sq mi (14,280 km^{2})
  - Water: 25 sq mi (65 km^{2}) 0.5%

Population (2020)
  - Total: 121,661
  - Estimate (2025): 120,340 ▼
  - Density: 24/sq mi (9.3/km^{2})
- Time zone: UTC−7 (Mountain)
  - Summer (DST): UTC−6 (MDT)
- Congressional district: 3rd
- Website: www.sjcounty.net

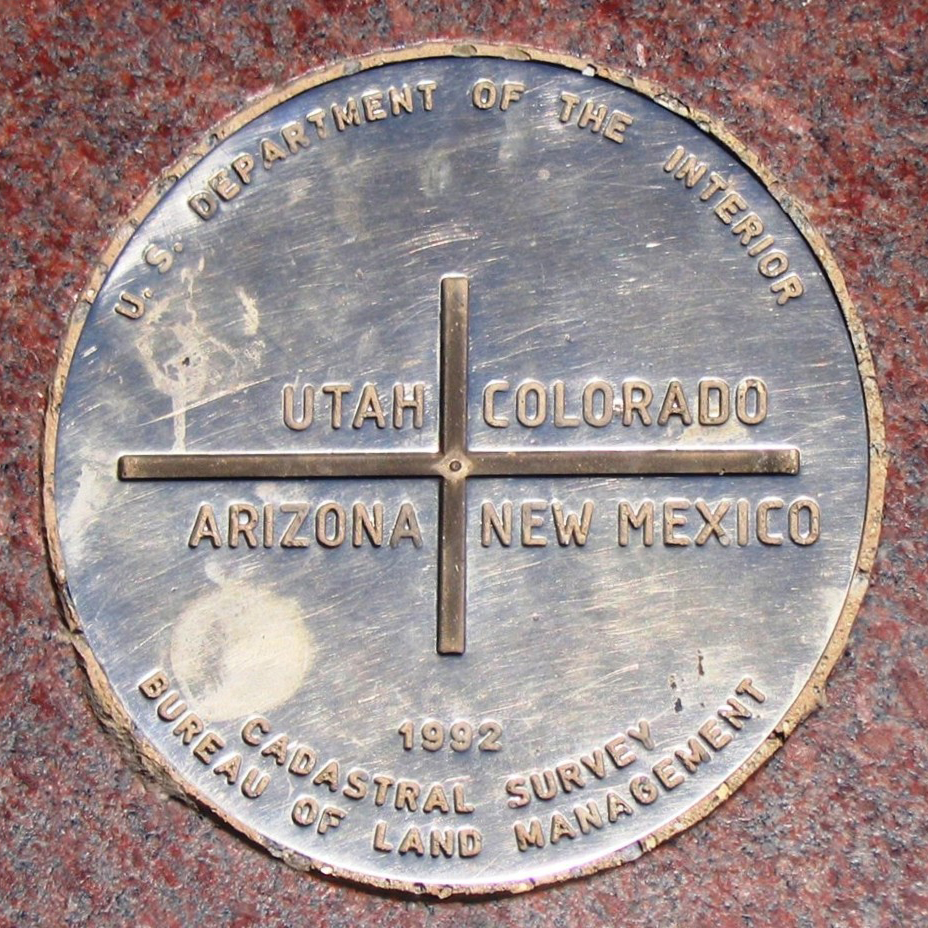
San Juan County includes the New Mexico section of the Four Corners Monument.

Shiprock

San Juan County (Spanish: Condado de San Juan) is a county located in the U.S. state of New Mexico. As of the 2020 census, its population was 121,661, making it the fifth-most populous county in New Mexico. Its county seat is Aztec. The county was created in 1887.

San Juan County is part of the Farmington, New Mexico, metropolitan statistical area. It is in the state's northwest corner and includes the New Mexico portion of the Four Corners.

== Geography ==
According to the U.S. Census Bureau, the county has a total area of 5,538 square miles (14,340 km^{2}), of which 25 square miles (65 km^{2}) (0.5%) are covered by water. Indian reservations (and off-reservation trust lands) comprise 63.4% of the county's land area. The Navajo Nation takes up 60.45% and the Ute Mountain Ute Tribe Reservation occupies another 2.93%.

The physical features include three rivers - the San Juan, Animas, and La Plata rivers, and the Chuska Mountains and Shiprock Pinnacle to the west. There are related volcanic structures, buttes, mesas, badlands, and fertile river valleys.

=== Adjacent counties ===
- Rio Arriba County - east
- Sandoval County - southeast
- McKinley County - south
- Apache County, Arizona - west
- San Juan County, Utah - northwest
- Montezuma County, Colorado - north
- La Plata County, Colorado - north
- Archuleta County, Colorado - northeast

=== National protected areas ===
- Aztec Ruins National Monument
- Chaco Culture National Historical Park (part)

=== Major highways ===
- U.S. Route 64
- U.S. Route 160
- U.S. Route 491 (formerly U.S. Route 666)
- U.S. Route 550
- New Mexico State Road 57
- New Mexico State Road 134
- New Mexico State Road 170
- New Mexico State Road 173
- New Mexico State Road 282
- New Mexico State Road 371
- New Mexico State Road 511
- New Mexico State Road 516
- New Mexico State Road 539
- New Mexico State Road 574
- New Mexico State Road 575
- New Mexico State Road 597(connector to Four Corners Monument)

== Demographics ==
Historical population
Census	Pop.	Note	%±
1890	1,890		—
1900	4,828		155.4%
1910	8,504		76.1%
1920	8,333		−2.0%
1930	14,701		76.4%
1940	17,115		16.4%
1950	18,292		6.9%
1960	53,306		191.4%
1970	52,517		−1.5%
1980	81,433		55.1%
1990	91,605		12.5%
2000	113,801		24.2%
2010	130,044		14.3%
2020	121,661		−6.4%
2025 (est.)	120,340	▼	−1.1%
U.S. Decennial Census; 1790-1960 1900-1990; 1990-2000 2010-2016

=== 2020 census ===
As of the 2020 census, the county had a population of 121,661. The median age was 36.5 years. 26.3% of residents were under the age of 18 and 15.6% of residents were 65 years of age or older. For every 100 females there were 96.4 males, and for every 100 females age 18 and over there were 94.0 males age 18 and over.

San Juan County, New Mexico – Racial and ethnic composition Note: the US Census treats Hispanic/Latino as an ethnic category. This table excludes Latinos from the racial categories and assigns them to a separate category. Hispanics/Latinos may be of any race.
Race / Ethnicity (NH = Non-Hispanic)	Pop 2000	Pop 2010	Pop 2020	% 2000	% 2010	% 2020
White alone (NH)	52,922	55,254	43,583	46.50%	42.49%	35.82%
Black or African American alone (NH)	429	617	554	0.38%	0.47%	0.46%
Native American or Alaska Native alone (NH)	41,290	46,321	48,413	36.28%	35.62%	39.79%
Asian alone (NH)	279	445	872	0.25%	0.34%	0.72%
Pacific Islander alone (NH)	36	64	67	0.03%	0.05%	0.06%
Other race alone (NH)	89	117	454	0.08%	0.09%	0.37%
Mixed race or Multiracial (NH)	1,699	2,450	4,088	1.49%	1.88%	3.36%
Hispanic or Latino (any race)	17,057	24,776	23,630	14.99%	19.05%	19.42%
Total	113,801	130,044	121,661	100.00%	100.00%	100.00%

The racial makeup of the county was 41.4% White, 0.6% Black or African American, 41.1% American Indian and Alaska Native, 0.8% Asian, 0.1% Native Hawaiian and Pacific Islander, 7.0% from some other race, and 9.1% from two or more races. Hispanic or Latino residents of any race comprised 19.4% of the population.

64.8% of residents lived in urban areas, while 35.2% lived in rural areas.

There were 42,536 households in the county, of which 36.1% had children under the age of 18 living with them and 28.0% had a female householder with no spouse or partner present. About 23.9% of all households were made up of individuals and 9.9% had someone living alone who was 65 years of age or older.

There were 47,744 housing units, of which 10.9% were vacant. Among occupied housing units, 70.2% were owner-occupied and 29.8% were renter-occupied. The homeowner vacancy rate was 1.8% and the rental vacancy rate was 9.9%.

=== 2010 census ===
As of the 2010 census, 130,044 people, 44,404 households, and 32,457 families were living in the county. The population density was 23.6 inhabitants per square mile (9.1/km^{2}). There were 49,341 housing units at an average density of 8.9 units per square mile (3.4 units/km^{2}). The racial makeup of the county was 51.6% White, 36.6% American Indian, 0.6% Black or African American, 0.4% Asian, 0.1% Pacific Islander, 7.3% from other races, and 3.5% from two or more races. Those of Hispanic or Latino origin made up 19.1% of the population. The largest ancestry groups were:

- 34.8% Navajo
- 15.0% English
- 10.7% Mexican
- 9.1% German
- 5.9% Irish
- 4.4% Spanish
- 2.8% American
- 1.8% French
- 1.4% Italian
- 1.2% Scottish
- 1.1% Scotch-Irish
- 1.1% Swedish

Of the 44,404 households, 40.5% had children under 18 living with them, 49.7% were married couples living together, 15.6% had a female householder with no husband present, 26.9% were not families, and 21.9% of households were made up of individuals. The average household size was 2.89 and the average family size was 3.38. The median age was 33.0 years.

The median household income was $46,189 and the median family income was $53,540. Males had a median income of $44,984 versus $30,245 for females. The per capita income for the county was $20,725. About 15.9% of families and 20.8% of the population were below the poverty line, including 28.0% of those under age 18 and 19.1% of those age 65 or over.

=== 2000 census ===
At the 2000 census there were 113,801 people, 37,711 households, and 28,924 families living in the county. The population density was 21 people per square mile (8.1 people/km^{2}). There were 43,221 housing units at an average density of 8 units per square mile (3.1/km^{2}). The racial makeup of the county was 52.83% White, 0.44% Black or African American, 36.88% Native American, 0.27% Asian, 0.05% Pacific Islander, 6.77% from other races, and 2.78% from two or more races. 14.99% of the population were Hispanic or Latino of any race. Of the 37,712 households, 42.0% had children under 18 living with them, 55.7% were married couples living together, 14.7% had a female head of household with no husband present, and 23.3% were not families. About 19.3% of households were one person and 6.4% were one person 65 or older. The average household size was 2.99 and the average family size was 3.43.

The age distribution was 32.6% under 18, 10.0% from 18 to 24, 28.1% from 25 to 44, 20.2% from 45 to 64, and 9.10% 65 or older. The median age was 31 years. For every 100 females, there were 98.30 males. For every 100 females 18 and over, there were 94.70 males.

The median household income was $33,762 and the median family income was $37,382. Males had a median income of $35,066 versus $21,299 for females. The per capita income for the county was $14,282. About 18.0% of families and 21.5% of the population were below the poverty line, including 26.6% of those under age 18 and 18.2% of those 65 or over.

== Communities ==
=== Cities ===
- Aztec
- Bloomfield
- Farmington

=== Town ===
- Kirtland

=== Census-designated places ===
- Angustura
- Beclabito
- Blanco
- Cedar Hill
- Center Point
- Crystal‡
- Flora Vista
- La Boca
- La Plata
- Lake Valley
- Lee Acres
- Middle Mesa
- Nageezi
- Napi Headquarters
- Naschitti
- Navajo Dam
- Nenahnezad
- Newcomb
- North Light Plant
- Ojo Amarillo
- Sanostee
- Sheep Springs
- Shiprock
- Spencerville
- Totah Vista
- Turley
- Upper Fruitland
- Waterflow
- West Hammond

=== Other communities ===
- Fruitland
- Huerfano
- Riverside
- White Rock

== Politics ==
The county has consistently voted for the Republican Party, though Democrats have usually gotten at least 30% of the vote. The only Democratic presidential candidate to win the county since 1936 was Lyndon B. Johnson in his 1964 landslide, who only narrowly won the county by just 93 votes and a margin of victory of less than 1%. San Juan County is the most populous county in New Mexico to lean Republican. The cities of Farmington, Bloomfield, Aztec, and Kirtland all lean strongly Republican, as does the rural area in the north and east of the county. The rural districts to the southwest around Nageezi, which have a high Native American population, saw a Republican trend in the 2024 election and flipped to give Donald Trump a slim majority. The western half of the county including the community of Shiprock, an area which is dominated by the Navajo Nation, votes traditionally Democratic.

United States presidential election results for San Juan County, New Mexico
Year	Republican		Democratic		Third party(ies)	
Year	No.	%	No.	%	No.	%
1912	203	19.04%	493	46.25%	370	34.71%
1916	385	36.05%	637	59.64%	46	4.31%
1920	985	53.42%	831	45.07%	28	1.52%
1924	889	44.88%	819	41.34%	273	13.78%
1928	1,436	66.36%	724	33.46%	4	0.18%
1932	925	35.10%	1,506	57.15%	204	7.74%
1936	1,345	45.69%	1,530	51.97%	69	2.34%
1940	1,757	54.79%	1,445	45.06%	5	0.16%
1944	1,438	56.61%	1,093	43.03%	9	0.35%
1948	2,407	60.71%	1,544	38.94%	14	0.35%
1952	3,864	69.73%	1,659	29.94%	18	0.32%
1956	5,194	67.54%	2,425	31.53%	71	0.92%
1960	7,521	57.04%	5,370	40.73%	294	2.23%
1964	6,808	49.01%	6,901	49.68%	183	1.32%
1968	7,664	54.03%	4,036	28.45%	2,485	17.52%
1972	10,788	67.55%	4,296	26.90%	886	5.55%
1976	10,852	55.13%	8,615	43.77%	216	1.10%
1980	15,579	66.30%	6,705	28.53%	1,215	5.17%
1984	18,690	66.97%	8,963	32.11%	257	0.92%
1988	16,202	58.39%	11,094	39.98%	454	1.64%
1992	13,415	44.30%	11,302	37.32%	5,564	18.37%
1996	17,478	53.69%	12,070	37.08%	3,005	9.23%
2000	21,434	61.85%	11,980	34.57%	1,243	3.59%
2004	29,525	65.60%	14,843	32.98%	638	1.42%
2008	27,869	59.92%	18,028	38.76%	614	1.32%
2012	28,849	62.39%	15,855	34.29%	1,533	3.32%
2016	27,946	60.61%	12,865	27.90%	5,299	11.49%
2020	32,874	62.86%	18,083	34.58%	1,337	2.56%
2024	34,264	64.74%	17,464	33.00%	1,198	2.26%

== Education ==
School districts include:

- Aztec Municipal Schools
- Bloomfield Municipal Schools
- Central Consolidated Schools
- Farmington Municipal Schools

== See also ==
- Bisti/De-Na-Zin Wilderness
- National Register of Historic Places listings in San Juan County, New Mexico
