= Nageezi, New Mexico =

Nageezi, New Mexico Naayízí (Navajo)
- CDP
- Location of Nageezi, New Mexico

- Location in the United States
- Coordinates: 36°15′27″N 107°44′43″W
- Country: United States
- State: New Mexico
- County: San Juan

Area
  - Total: 14.10 sq mi (36.52 km^{2})
  - Land: 14.10 sq mi (36.51 km^{2})
  - Water: 0.0039 sq mi (0.01 km^{2})
- Elevation: 6,795 ft (2,071 m)

Population (2020)
  - Total: 277
  - Density: 19.7/sq mi (7.59/km^{2})
- Time zone: UTC-7 (Mountain (MST))
  - Summer (DST): UTC-6 (MDT)
- ZIP code: 87037
- Area code: 505
- FIPS code: 35-50790
- GNIS feature ID: 2408898

Nageezi is a census-designated place (CDP) in San Juan County, New Mexico, United States. As of the 2020 census, Nageezi had a population of 277. It is part of the Farmington Metropolitan Statistical Area. A post office was established in 1941. Nageezi's name in Navajo means "squash."

== Geography ==
According to the United States Census Bureau, the CDP has a total area of 14.3 square miles (37 km^{2}), all land.

== Demographics ==
Historical population
Census	Pop.	Note	%±
2020	277		—
U.S. Decennial Census

As of the census of 2000, there were 296 people, 83 households, and 73 families residing in the CDP. The population density was 20.7 inhabitants per square mile (8.0/km^{2}). There were 115 housing units at an average density of 8.0 per square mile (3.1/km^{2}). The racial makeup of the CDP was 99.32% Native American and 0.68% from other races. Hispanic or Latino of any race were 0.68% of the population.

There were 83 households, out of which 53.0% had children under the age of 18 living with them, 48.2% were married couples living together, 26.5% had a female householder with no husband present, and 12.0% were non-families. 12.0% of all households were made up of individuals, and 4.8% had someone living alone who was 65 years of age or older. The average household size was 3.57 and the average family size was 3.81.

In the CDP, the population was spread out, with 38.5% under the age of 18, 10.1% from 18 to 24, 26.0% from 25 to 44, 15.5% from 45 to 64, and 9.8% who were 65 years of age or older. The median age was 26 years. For every 100 females, there were 86.2 males. For every 100 females age 18 and over, there were 87.6 males.

The median income for a household in the CDP was $11,042, and the median income for a family was $11,042. The per capita income for the CDP was $3,502. About 64.0% of families and 75.3% of the population were below the poverty line, including 100% of those under the age of 18 and 28% of those 65 or over.

== Education ==
The community of Nageezi is part of the Bloomfield School District. Bloomfield High School is the local high school.

== See also ==
- List of census-designated places in New Mexico
