= Cedar Hill, New Mexico =

- Unincorporated community
- Location within New Mexico
- Coordinates: 36°56′13″N 107°53′25″W
- Country: United States
- State: New Mexico
- County: San Juan

Area
  - Total: 9.70 sq mi (25.12 km^{2})
  - Land: 9.40 sq mi (24.35 km^{2})
  - Water: 0.30 sq mi (0.77 km^{2})
- Elevation: 5,860 ft (1,790 m)

Population (2020)
  - Total: 1,130
  - Density: 120.2/sq mi (46.41/km^{2})
- Time zone: UTC-7 (Mountain (MST))
  - Summer (DST): UTC-6 (MDT)
- Area code: 505
- GNIS feature ID: 902202

Cedar Hill is an unincorporated community and census-designated place in San Juan County, New Mexico, United States. As of the 2020 census, Cedar Hill had a population of 1,130. The community is located on U.S. Route 550, near the Colorado border. Cedar Hill was originally known as Cox's Crossing. The name was chosen during a Literacy Society meeting by picking names out of a hat. A post office operated from 1892 to 1966.

== Geography ==
According to the U.S. Census Bureau, the community has an area of 5.561 square miles (14.40 km^{2}); 5.352 square miles (13.86 km^{2}) of its area is land, and 0.209 square miles (0.54 km^{2}) is water.

== Demographics ==
Historical population
Census	Pop.	Note	%±
2020	1,130		—
U.S. Decennial Census

== Education ==
The school district is Aztec Municipal Schools. Aztec High School is the local high school.
