= Bloomfield, New Mexico =

- City
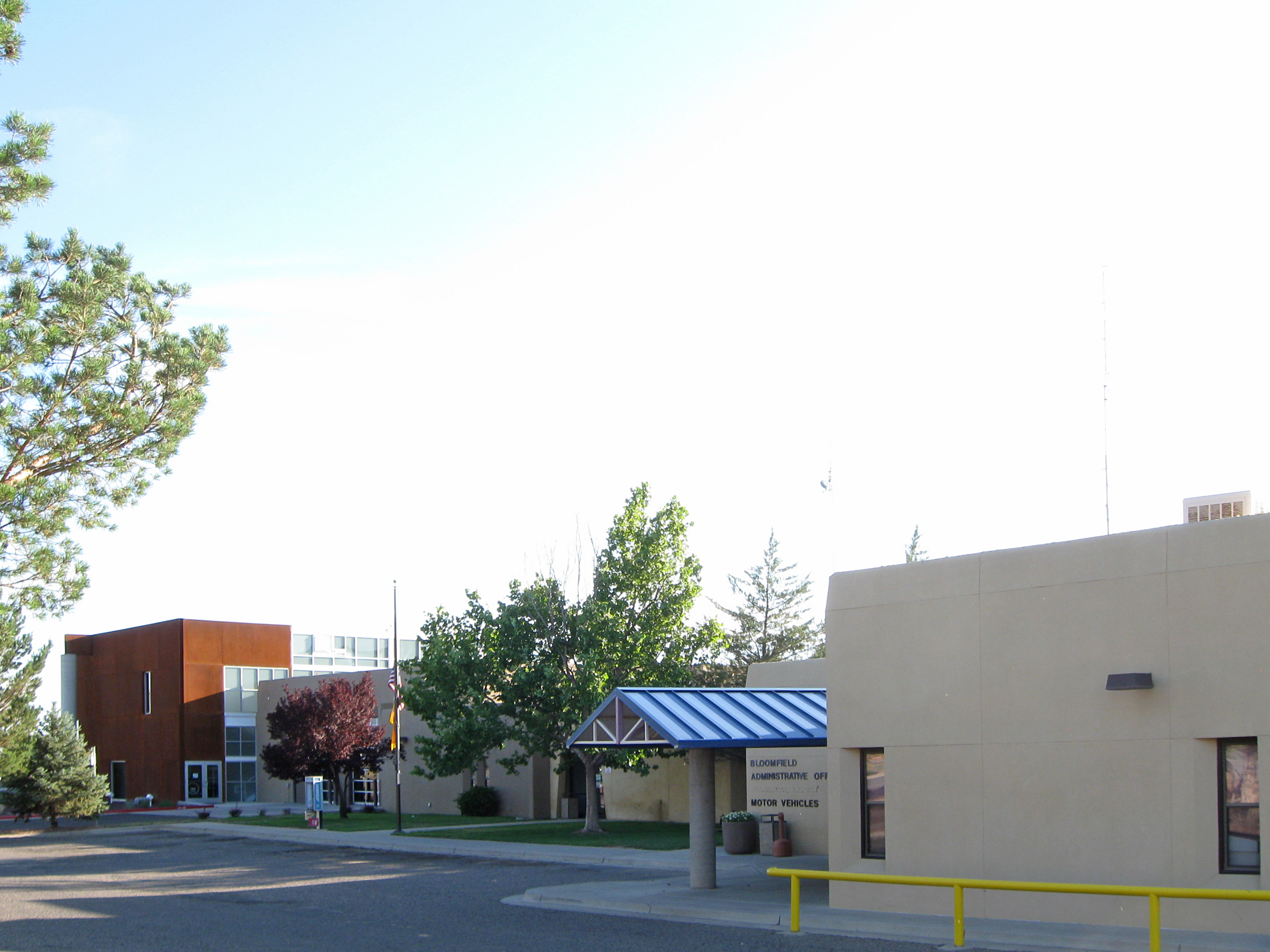
- Bloomfield Administrative Offices

- Location within County (left) and State (right)

- Location in the United States
- Coordinates: 36°44′24″N 107°58′24″W
- Country: United States
- State: New Mexico
- County: San Juan

Government
  - Type: Council–manager
  - Mayor: Cynthia Atencio

Area
  - Total: 18.59 sq mi (48.15 km^{2})
  - Land: 18.55 sq mi (48.04 km^{2})
  - Water: 0.042 sq mi (0.11 km^{2})
- Elevation: 5,614 ft (1,711 m)

Population (2020)
  - Total: 7,421
  - Density: 400.1/sq mi (154.48/km^{2})
- Time zone: UTC-07:00 (MST)
  - Summer (DST): UTC-06:00 (MDT)
- ZIP code: 87413
- Area code: 505
- FIPS code: 35-07880
- GNIS feature ID: 2409865
- Website: bloomfieldnm.gov

Bloomfield (Navajo: Naabiʼání) is a city in northeastern San Juan County, New Mexico, United States. It is part of the Farmington Metropolitan Statistical Area. As of the 2020 census, Bloomfield had a population of 7,421.

It is on the Trails of the Ancients Byway, one of the designated New Mexico Scenic Byways.

== Geography ==
According to the United States Census Bureau, the city has a total area of 5.1 square miles (13 km^{2}), of which 5.0 square miles (13 km^{2}) is land and 0.1 square miles (0.26 km^{2}) (0.99%) is water.

== Climate ==
According to the Köppen Climate Classification system, Bloomfield has a cold semi-arid climate, abbreviated "BSk" on climate maps. The hottest temperature recorded in Bloomfield was 107 °F (41.7 °C) on June 26 1950, while the coldest temperature recorded was −30 °F (−34.4 °C) on January 3, 1919.

Climate data for Bloomfield, New Mexico, 1991–2020 normals, extremes 1892–2018
Month	Jan	Feb	Mar	Apr	May	Jun	Jul	Aug	Sep	Oct	Nov	Dec	Year
Record high °F (°C)	64 (18)	70 (21)	89 (32)	90 (32)	100 (38)	107 (42)	106 (41)	103 (39)	98 (37)	90 (32)	78 (26)	69 (21)	107 (42)
Mean daily maximum °F (°C)	43.4 (6.3)	50.3 (10.2)	60.8 (16.0)	68.8 (20.4)	78.2 (25.7)	89.3 (31.8)	92.4 (33.6)	89.7 (32.1)	82.8 (28.2)	70.5 (21.4)	55.6 (13.1)	43.8 (6.6)	68.8 (20.5)
Daily mean °F (°C)	32.0 (0.0)	37.7 (3.2)	45.7 (7.6)	53.0 (11.7)	62.0 (16.7)	72.4 (22.4)	77.3 (25.2)	75.0 (23.9)	67.6 (19.8)	55.4 (13.0)	42.1 (5.6)	32.4 (0.2)	54.4 (12.4)
Mean daily minimum °F (°C)	20.6 (−6.3)	25.2 (−3.8)	30.6 (−0.8)	37.2 (2.9)	45.9 (7.7)	55.5 (13.1)	62.1 (16.7)	60.3 (15.7)	52.4 (11.3)	40.3 (4.6)	28.6 (−1.9)	20.9 (−6.2)	40.0 (4.4)
Record low °F (°C)	−30 (−34)	−22 (−30)	2 (−17)	9 (−13)	19 (−7)	28 (−2)	38 (3)	36 (2)	21 (−6)	13 (−11)	−5 (−21)	−29 (−34)	−30 (−34)
Average precipitation inches (mm)	0.66 (17)	0.57 (14)	0.57 (14)	0.67 (17)	0.49 (12)	0.21 (5.3)	0.72 (18)	1.11 (28)	0.99 (25)	0.80 (20)	0.72 (18)	0.57 (14)	8.08 (202.3)
Average snowfall inches (cm)	2.2 (5.6)	1.6 (4.1)	0.3 (0.76)	0.0 (0.0)	0.0 (0.0)	0.0 (0.0)	0.0 (0.0)	0.0 (0.0)	0.0 (0.0)	0.3 (0.76)	0.4 (1.0)	2.0 (5.1)	6.8 (17.32)
Average precipitation days (≥ 0.01 in)	4.2	3.6	3.3	2.8	2.3	1.1	3.3	4.4	4.1	3.8	3.3	3.9	40.1
Average snowy days (≥ 0.1 in)	1.8	1.1	0.4	0.1	0.0	0.0	0.0	0.0	0.0	0.1	0.4	1.1	5.0
Source 1: NOAA
Source 2: xmACIS2

== Demographics ==
Historical population
Census	Pop.	Note	%±
1960	1,292		—
1970	1,574		21.8%
1980	4,881		210.1%
1990	5,214		6.8%
2000	6,417		23.1%
2010	8,112		26.4%
2020	7,421		−8.5%
U.S. Decennial Census

=== Racial and ethnic composition ===
Racial Makeup
Race (NH = Non-Hispanic)	% 2020	% 2010	% 2000	Pop. 2020	Pop. 2010	Pop. 2000
White Alone (NH)	37.6%	48.3%	53.8%	2,789	3,917	3,452
Black Alone (NH)	0.3%	0.4%	0.2%	20	33	12
American Indian Alone (NH)	26.1%	17.3%	16.2%	1,934	1,401	1,038
Asian Alone (NH)	0.8%	0.4%	0.3%	58	31	19
Pacific Islander Alone (NH)	0%	0%	0%	1	1	0
Other Race Alone (NH)	0.4%	0.1%	0.2%	28	7	10
Multiracial (NH)	3.2%	1.9%	1.9%	235	151	121
Hispanic (Any race)	31.7%	31.7%	27.5%	2,356	2,571	1,765

=== 2020 census ===
As of the 2020 census, Bloomfield had a population of 7,421. The median age was 33.4 years. 29.7% of residents were under the age of 18 and 15.1% of residents were 65 years of age or older. For every 100 females there were 91.9 males, and for every 100 females age 18 and over there were 86.9 males age 18 and over.

94.0% of residents lived in urban areas, while 6.0% lived in rural areas.

There were 2,652 households in Bloomfield, of which 39.6% had children under the age of 18 living in them. Of all households, 41.4% were married-couple households, 17.5% were households with a male householder and no spouse or partner present, and 31.1% were households with a female householder and no spouse or partner present. About 24.9% of all households were made up of individuals and 11.2% had someone living alone who was 65 years of age or older.

There were 2,961 housing units, of which 10.4% were vacant. The homeowner vacancy rate was 2.3% and the rental vacancy rate was 10.1%.

=== 2000 census ===
As of the census of 2000, there were 6,417 people, 2,222 households, and 1,708 families residing in the city. The population density was 1,280.7 inhabitants per square mile (494.5/km^{2}). There were 2,446 housing units at an average density of 488.2 per square mile (188.5/km^{2}). The racial makeup of the city was 62.38% White, 0.33% African American, 16.71% Native American, 0.34% Asian, 0.06% Pacific Islander, 15.96% from other races, and 4.22% from two or more races. Hispanic or Latino of any race were 27.51% of the population.

There were 2,222 households, out of which 42.6% had children under the age of 18 living with them, 55.9% were married couples living together, 15.5% had a female householder with no husband present, and 23.1% were non-families. 19.7% of all households were made up of individuals, and 7.4% had someone living alone who was 65 years of age or older. The average household size was 2.85 and the average family size was 3.26.

In the city, the population was spread out, with 32.4% under the age of 18, 9.7% from 18 to 24, 27.0% from 25 to 44, 20.9% from 45 to 64, and 10.0% who were 65 years of age or older. The median age was 31 years. For every 100 females, there were 91.4 males. For every 100 females age 18 and over, there were 89.5 males.

The median income for a household in the city was $32,905, and the median income for a family was $34,760. Males had a median income of $29,144 versus $19,203 for females. The per capita income for the city was $14,424. About 15.2% of families and 14.7% of the population were below the poverty line, including 18.5% of those under age 18 and 13.6% of those age 65 or over.

== Education ==
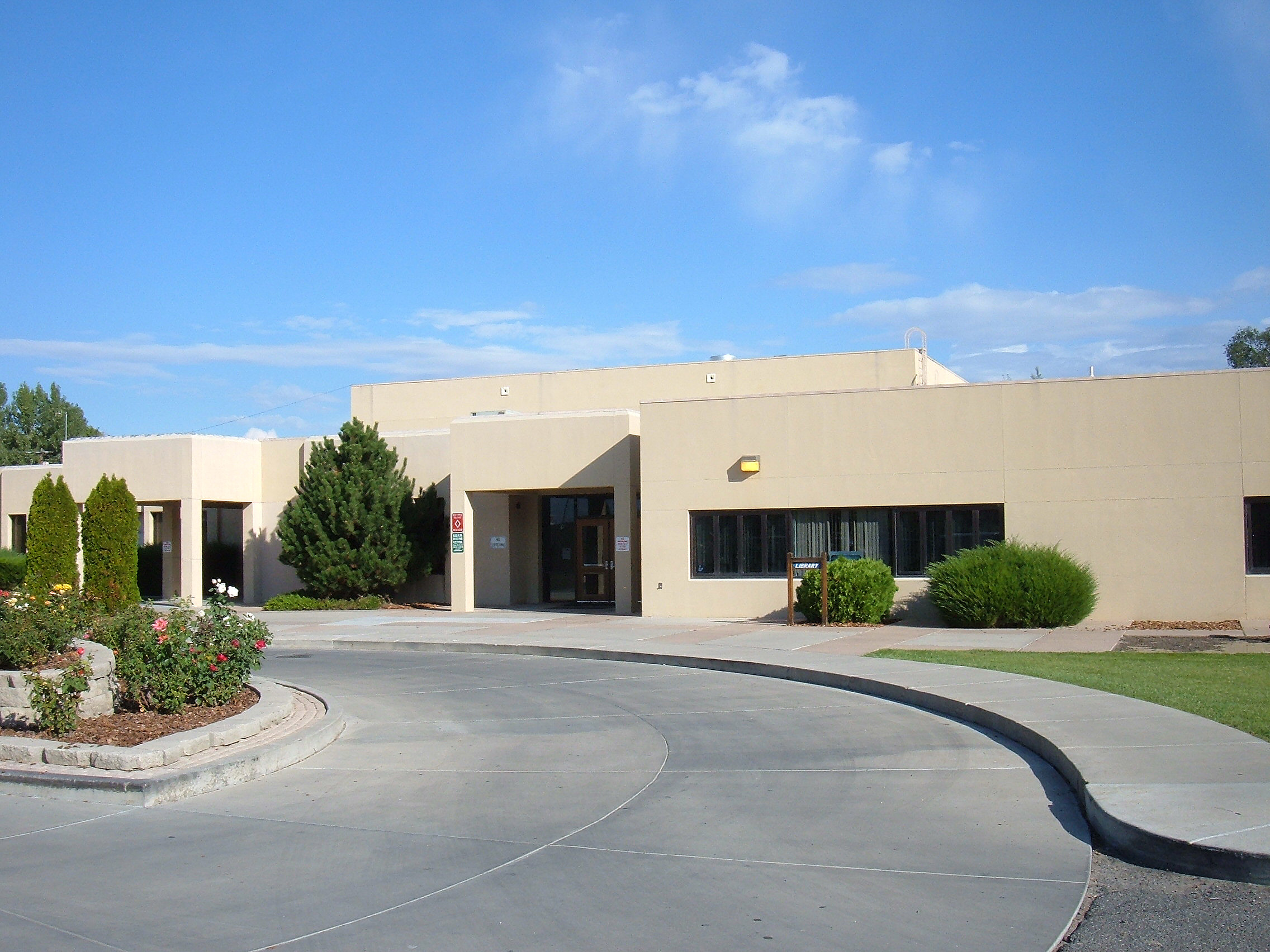
Bloomfield Public Library

Most of the city of Bloomfield and rural areas in eastern/southeastern San Juan County are served by Bloomfield Schools. Bloomfield High School is the local high school.

A portion of northern Bloomfield is zoned to Aztec Municipal Schools. Aztec High School is the local high school of that section.

Until 1956, all students from Bloomfield went to Aztec High. In 1956, Bloomfield High formed out of the town's junior high school.

== Points of interest ==
The Salmon Ruins pueblo and museum are located just to the west of the city along Highway 64. The ruins are the remains of a 12th-century Anasazi village. The ruins, as well as the homestead of George Salmon are open to the public.

Other nearby attractions include the Aztec Ruins, about 15 miles (24 km) to the north in the town of Aztec, and the Chaco Culture National Historical Park, approximately 50 miles (80 km) to the south.

== Government ==
Bloomfield's government consists of four council members elected at large and a mayor. Members of the City Council serve with minimal financial compensation. The current mayor of Bloomfield is Cynthia Atencio.

== Felix v. City of Bloomfield ==
In April 2007, Bloomfield attracted attention and some controversy when the city council voted unanimously to erect a stone monument of the Ten Commandments at the city hall. Two residents sued the city in 2012 "alleging it violated their constitutional rights and represented a government endorsement of religion". In August 2014, a federal judge ruled the monument must be removed. The city's response to the lawsuit was that it was a local group that paid for the memorial and they had added a disclaimer. A district judge decided that a "reasonable observer would interpret the monument as the government endorsing a religion". The ACLU became involved and the city asked the Supreme Court to hear the case, but was refused. The city owed court fees of $700,000 to the ACLU and the monument was moved to "property owned by a Baptist church. The city had been looking for outside funds to pay the fee, but in June 2018, it released its 2019 budget which calls for "paying $233,000 toward the money it owes from the ... lawsuit". The city had until 2021 to pay the amount in full. Hemant Mehta stated that the "city officials were goaded by the Christian Right into fighting back. "

== See also ==
- List of cities in New Mexico
