= Blanco, New Mexico =

- Census-designated place
- Location within New Mexico
- Coordinates: 36°43′04″N 107°49′45″W
- Country: United States
- State: New Mexico
- County: San Juan

Area
  - Total: 6.49 sq mi (16.80 km^{2})
  - Land: 6.15 sq mi (15.92 km^{2})
  - Water: 0.34 sq mi (0.89 km^{2})
- Elevation: 5,591 ft (1,704 m)

Population (2020)
  - Total: 491
  - Density: 79.9/sq mi (30.85/km^{2})
- Time zone: UTC-7 (Mountain (MST))
  - Summer (DST): UTC-6 (MDT)
- ZIP code: 87412
- Area code: 505
- GNIS feature ID: 2584057

Blanco is a census-designated place in San Juan County, New Mexico, United States. As of the 2020 census, Blanco had a population of 491. Blanco has a post office with ZIP code 87412, which opened on March 6, 1901. U.S. Route 64 passes through the community.

A parish was established in Blanco in 1900 with St. Rose of Lima Catholic Church being the mother church for many missions.

== Demographics ==
Historical population
Census	Pop.	Note	%±
2020	491		—
U.S. Decennial Census

== Education ==
The area school district is Bloomfield Schools. Bloomfield High School is the local high school.
