= Arboles, Colorado =

Census-designated place in Archuleta County, Colorado, United States

- Census-designated place
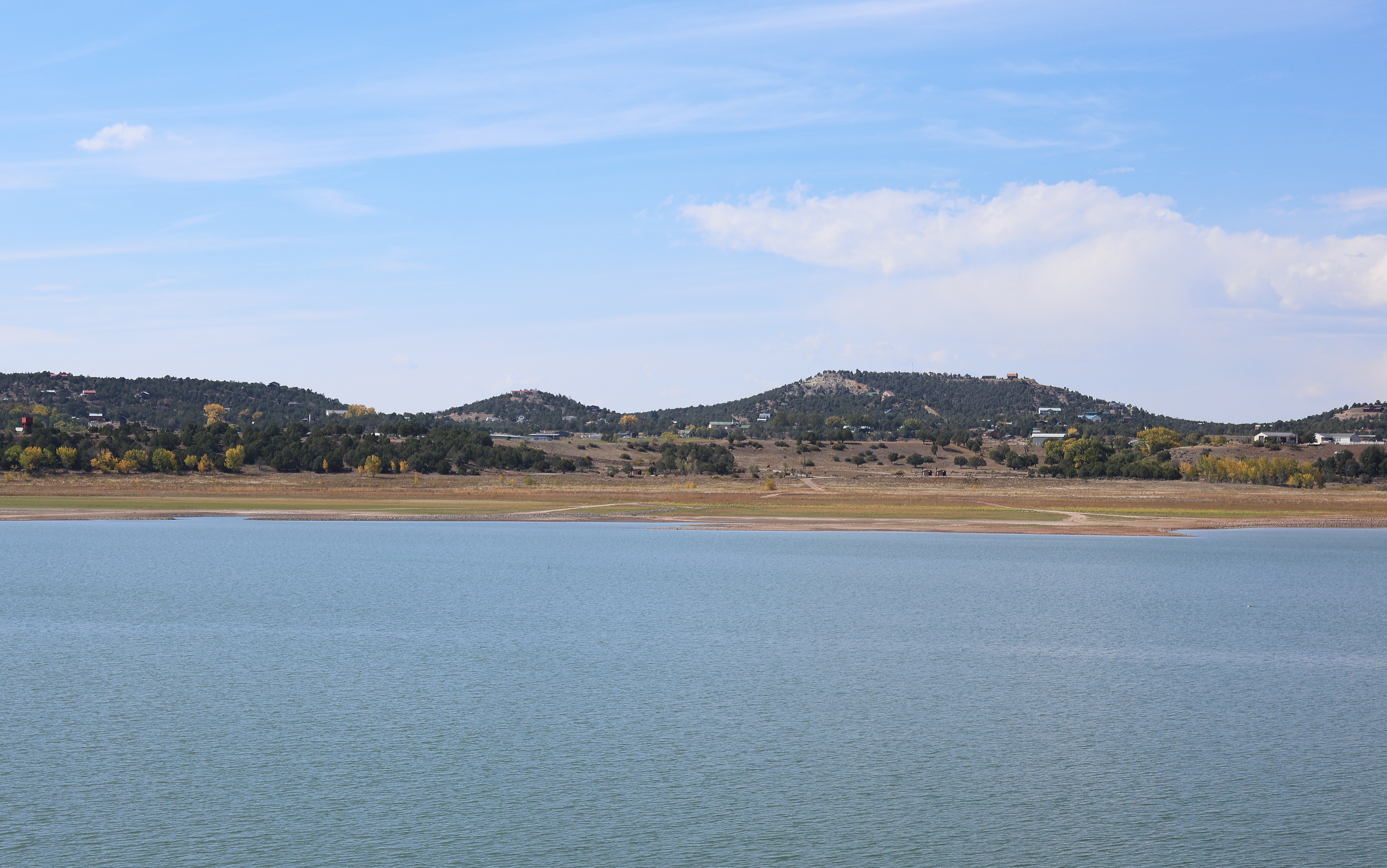
- Arboles from a point across an arm of Navajo Lake

- Location of the Arboles CDP in Archuleta County, Colorado

- Location of Arboles, Colorado. Arboles (Colorado)
- Coordinates: 37°01′13″N 107°25′20″W
- Country: United States
- State: Colorado
- County: Archuleta
- Tribe: Southern Ute Indian Tribe

Government
  - Type: unincorporated community
  - Body: Archuleta County

Area
  - Total: 6.170 sq mi (15.981 km^{2})
  - Land: 5.155 sq mi (13.352 km^{2})
  - Water: 1.015 sq mi (2.629 km^{2})
- Elevation: 6,280 ft (1,910 m)

Population (2020)
  - Total: 308
  - Density: 54/sq mi (21/km^{2})
- Time zone: UTC−07:00 (MST)
  - Summer (DST): UTC−06:00 (MDT)
- ZIP Code: 81121
- Area code: 970
- GNIS town ID: 2407753
- FIPS code: 08-02905

Arboles is an unincorporated community and a census-designated place (CDP) on the Southern Ute Indian Reservation in southwestern Archuleta County, Colorado, United States. At the United States Census 2020, the population of the Arboles CDP was 308. The town's name means "trees" in Spanish. The Arboles post office has the ZIP code 81121.

== History ==
The Southern Ute Indian Reservation was created on November 9, 1878. The Arboles, Colorado, post office opened on December 13, 1882. Archuleta County was created on April 14, 1885.

== Geography ==
At the 2020 United States census, the Arboles CDP had an area of 3,949 acres (15.981 km^{2}), including 650 acres (2.629 km^{2}) of water.

== Demographics ==
The United States Census Bureau initially defined the Arboles CDP for the United States Census 2000. In the 2020 census, Arboles had a population of 308, a 10% increase from the 2010 census.

Arboles CDP, Colorado
Year	Pop.	±%
2000	232	—
2010	280	+20.7%
2020	308	+10.0%
Source: United States Census Bureau

== See also ==
- Navajo Lake
- Navajo State Park
- Old Spanish National Historic Trail
- Southern Ute Indian Reservation
