= Navajo Dam, New Mexico =

- Census-designated place
- Location within New Mexico
- Coordinates: 36°52′16″N 107°37′47″W
- Country: United States
- State: New Mexico
- County: San Juan

Area
  - Total: 13.49 sq mi (34.95 km^{2})
  - Land: 12.07 sq mi (31.26 km^{2})
  - Water: 1.42 sq mi (3.69 km^{2})
- Elevation: 5,699 ft (1,737 m)

Population (2020)
  - Total: 253
  - Density: 21.0/sq mi (8.09/km^{2})
- Time zone: UTC-7 (Mountain (MST))
  - Summer (DST): UTC-6 (MDT)
- ZIP code: 87419
- Area code: 505
- GNIS feature ID: 2584162

Navajo Dam is a census-designated place in San Juan County, New Mexico, United States. Its population was 253 as of the 2020 census. Navajo Dam has a post office with ZIP code 87419. The community is located in the vicinity of Navajo Dam.

== Geography ==
=== Climate ===
Climate data for Navajo Dam, New Mexico (1991–2020)
Month	Jan	Feb	Mar	Apr	May	Jun	Jul	Aug	Sep	Oct	Nov	Dec	Year
Mean daily maximum °F (°C)	41.9 (5.5)	48.3 (9.1)	58.6 (14.8)	66.7 (19.3)	76.3 (24.6)	87.6 (30.9)	92.1 (33.4)	89.1 (31.7)	81.5 (27.5)	68.8 (20.4)	53.1 (11.7)	41.3 (5.2)	67.1 (19.5)
Daily mean °F (°C)	31.6 (−0.2)	36.1 (2.3)	44.4 (6.9)	51.2 (10.7)	60.9 (16.1)	70.9 (21.6)	76.7 (24.8)	74.7 (23.7)	66.8 (19.3)	54.2 (12.3)	41.2 (5.1)	31.5 (−0.3)	53.4 (11.9)
Mean daily minimum °F (°C)	21.3 (−5.9)	23.9 (−4.5)	30.2 (−1.0)	35.6 (2.0)	45.5 (7.5)	54.3 (12.4)	61.3 (16.3)	60.3 (15.7)	52.2 (11.2)	39.6 (4.2)	29.4 (−1.4)	21.8 (−5.7)	39.6 (4.2)
Average precipitation inches (mm)	0.88 (22)	0.74 (19)	0.83 (21)	0.86 (22)	0.76 (19)	0.43 (11)	1.69 (43)	1.39 (35)	1.41 (36)	1.12 (28)	0.92 (23)	1.05 (27)	12.08 (306)
Average snowfall inches (cm)	2.8 (7.1)	1.6 (4.1)	0.3 (0.76)	0.0 (0.0)	0.0 (0.0)	0.0 (0.0)	0.0 (0.0)	0.0 (0.0)	0.0 (0.0)	0.5 (1.3)	0.4 (1.0)	2.1 (5.3)	7.7 (19.56)
Source: NOAA

== Demographics ==
Historical population
Census	Pop.	Note	%±
2010	281		—
2020	253		−10.0%
U.S. Decennial Census

== Education ==
Navajo Dam is divided between Bloomfield Municipal Schools (the majority) and Aztec Municipal Schools (a minority section). Bloomfield High School and Aztec High School are the high schools of the former and latter, respectively.
