= Tiffany, Colorado =

Unincorporated community in La Plata County, CO, USA

- Unincorporated community
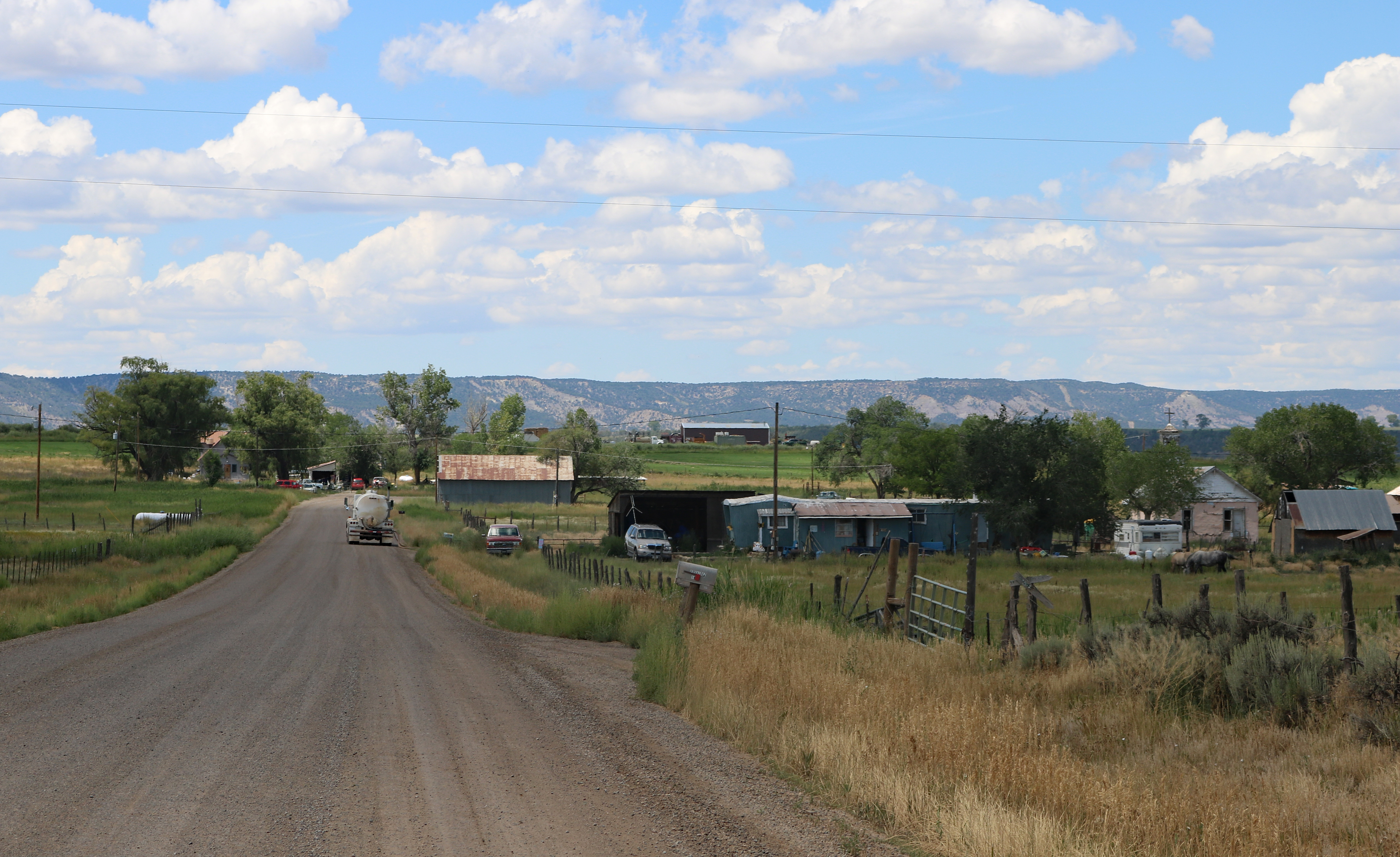
- County Road 321 in Tiffany (2019)

- Location of Tiffany, Colorado. Tiffany (Colorado)
- Coordinates: 37°01′58″N 107°32′17″W
- Country: United States
- State: Colorado
- County: La Plata County
- Tribe: Southern Ute Indian Tribe

Government
  - Type: Unincorporated community
  - Body: La Plata County
- Elevation: 6,342 ft (1,933 m)
- Time zone: UTC−07:00 (MST)
  - Summer (DST): UTC−06:00 (MDT)
- ZIP code: Ignacio 81137
- Area code: 970
- GNIS pop ID: 184493

Tiffany is an unincorporated community on the Southern Ute Indian Reservation in La Plata County, Colorado, United States. Tiffany is part of the Durango, CO Micropolitan Statistical Area. The Ignacio, Colorado, post office (ZIP Code 81137) now serves Tiffany.

== History ==
The Tiffany, Colorado, post office operated from December 3, 1907, until November 30, 1954. The community was named after Ed Tiffany, a pioneer settler.

== See also ==
- Southern Ute Indian Reservation
- Ute people
