= Allison, Colorado =

Unincorporated community in La Plata County, Colorado, United States

- unincorporated community
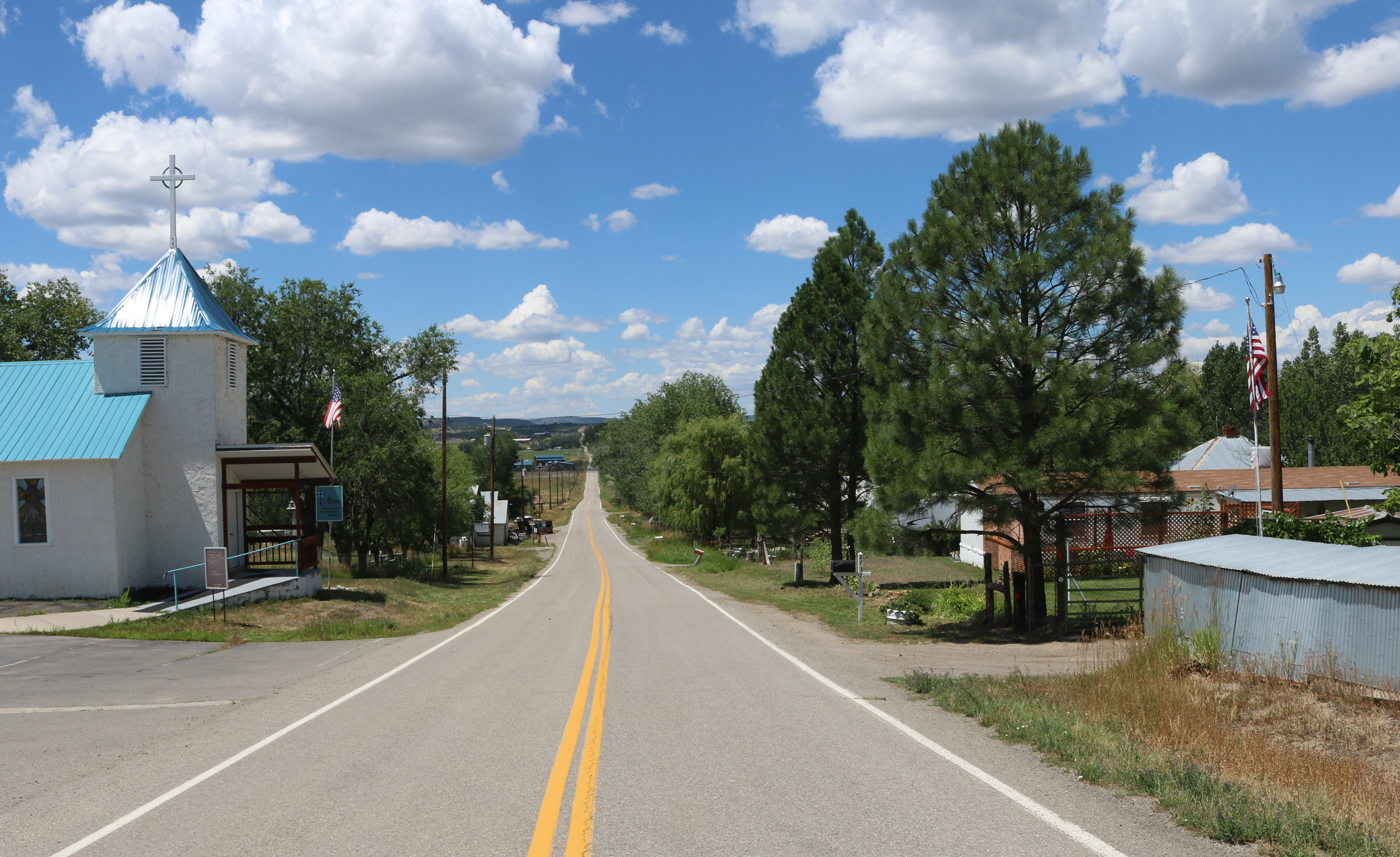
- County Road 329 and the Allison Community Presbyterian Church in 2019

- Location of Allison, Colorado. Allison (Colorado)
- Coordinates: 37°01′28″N 107°29′17″W
- Country: United States
- State: Colorado
- County: La Plata
- Tribe: Southern Ute Indian Tribe

Government
  - Type: unincorporated community
  - Body: La Plata County
- Elevation: 6,217 ft (1,895 m)
- Time zone: UTC−07:00 (MST)
  - Summer (DST): UTC−06:00 (MDT)
- Area code: 970
- GNIS pop ID: 204734

Allison is an unincorporated community on the Southern Ute Indian Reservation in La Plata County, Colorado, United States.

== History ==
The Southern Ute Indian Reservation was created on November 9, 1878. The Allison, Colorado, post office operated from August 22, 1904, until November 30, 1954. The community was named after Allison Stocker, a government surveyor. Allison is now served by the Ignacio, Colorado, post office (ZIP code 81137).

== See also ==
- Durango, CO Micropolitan Statistical Area
- Southern Ute Indian Reservation
