= Southern Ute Cultural Center and Museum =

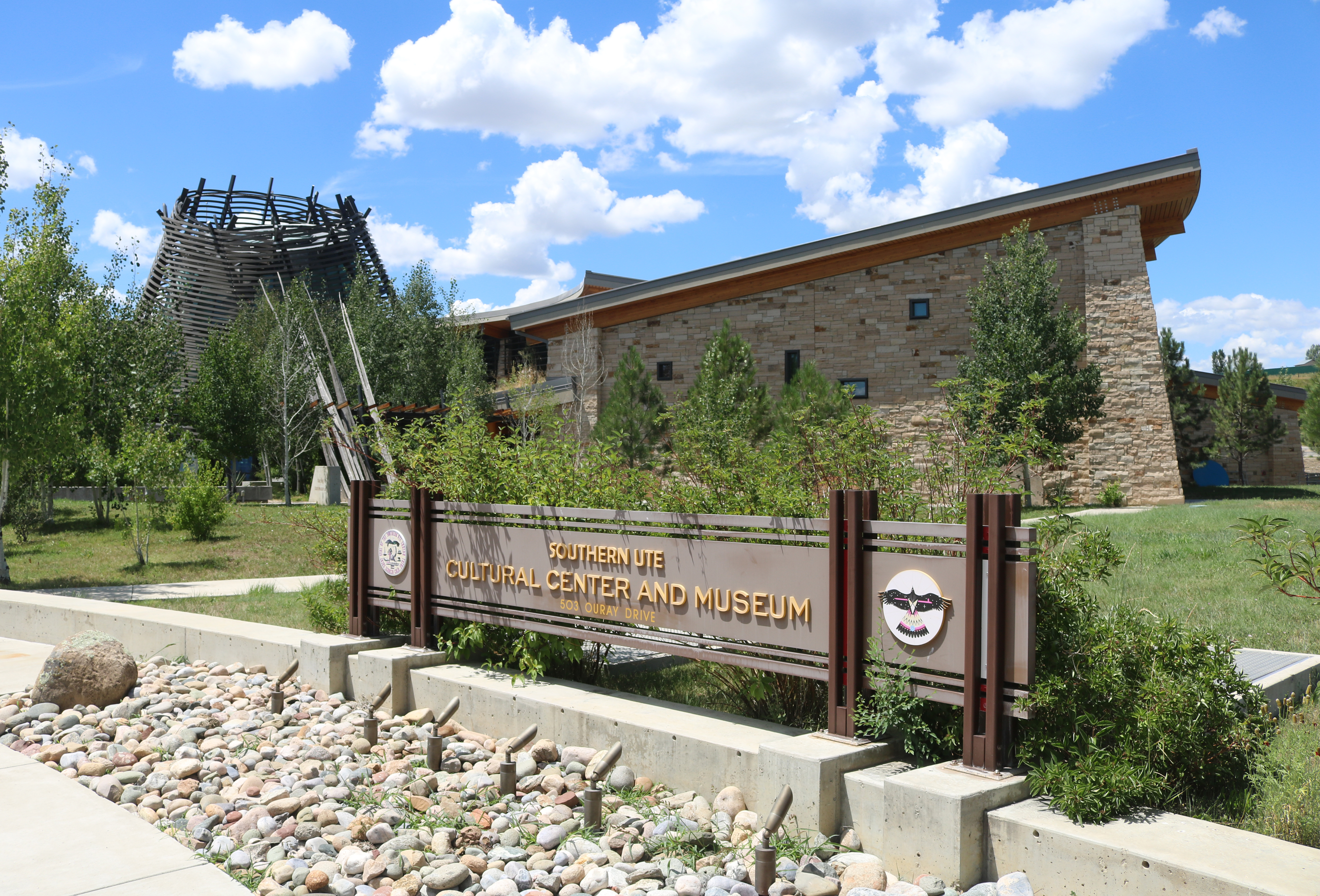
- Established: The museum was first founded in 1971 and was previously located in another building. The present building was constructed in 2011.
- Location: 503 Ouray Drive; Ignacio, Colorado, U.S.
- Coordinates: 37°8′3″N 107°38′7″W
- Director: Susan Cimburek
- Architects: Jones & Jones Architects in Seattle, Washington
- Website: www.southernutemuseum.org

Southern Ute Cultural Center and Museum is a historic, cultural, and educational museum about the Southern Ute people in Ignacio, Colorado. The museum, surrounded by gardens, was built by Southern Ute tribe members in 2011, many of whom donated or loaned artifacts for the museum.

== Museum ==
The museum tells the story of the Southern Ute people, "Numi Nuuchiyu, We Are the Ute People", throughout prehistoric and current times. Features include a life-sized buffalo hide tipi and the Circle of Life sculpture and glass ceiling. Articles on exhibit include a bear totem pole, clothing, and replicas of cave drawings. The ceremonial Bear Dance is performed in the spring at the museum. It also depicts the story of Utes being removed from their land and Ute children removed from their families and placed in boarding schools to be assimilated to lives of white people.

Some of the artifacts were donated by members of the Southern Ute Reservation, like the dress worn by Buckskin Charlie's wife. It was donated by Bennett Thompson, a tribe elder, who was instrumental in the creation of the museum. A plaque installed in the museum honors his dedication to building a state-of-the-art museum inspired by the National Museum of the American Indian in Washington, D.C. He sat on the board of trustees for more than 22 years.

It has audio-visual presentations and photographic curtains. In a wing of the museum is a classroom for sewing classes for elders and a large room for events hosted by the organization. The Ute language is taught in the classrooms. There is also a library.

== See also ==
- Ute Indian Museum
