= Southern Ute, Colorado =

Census-designated place in La Plata County, CO, USA

- Census-designated place
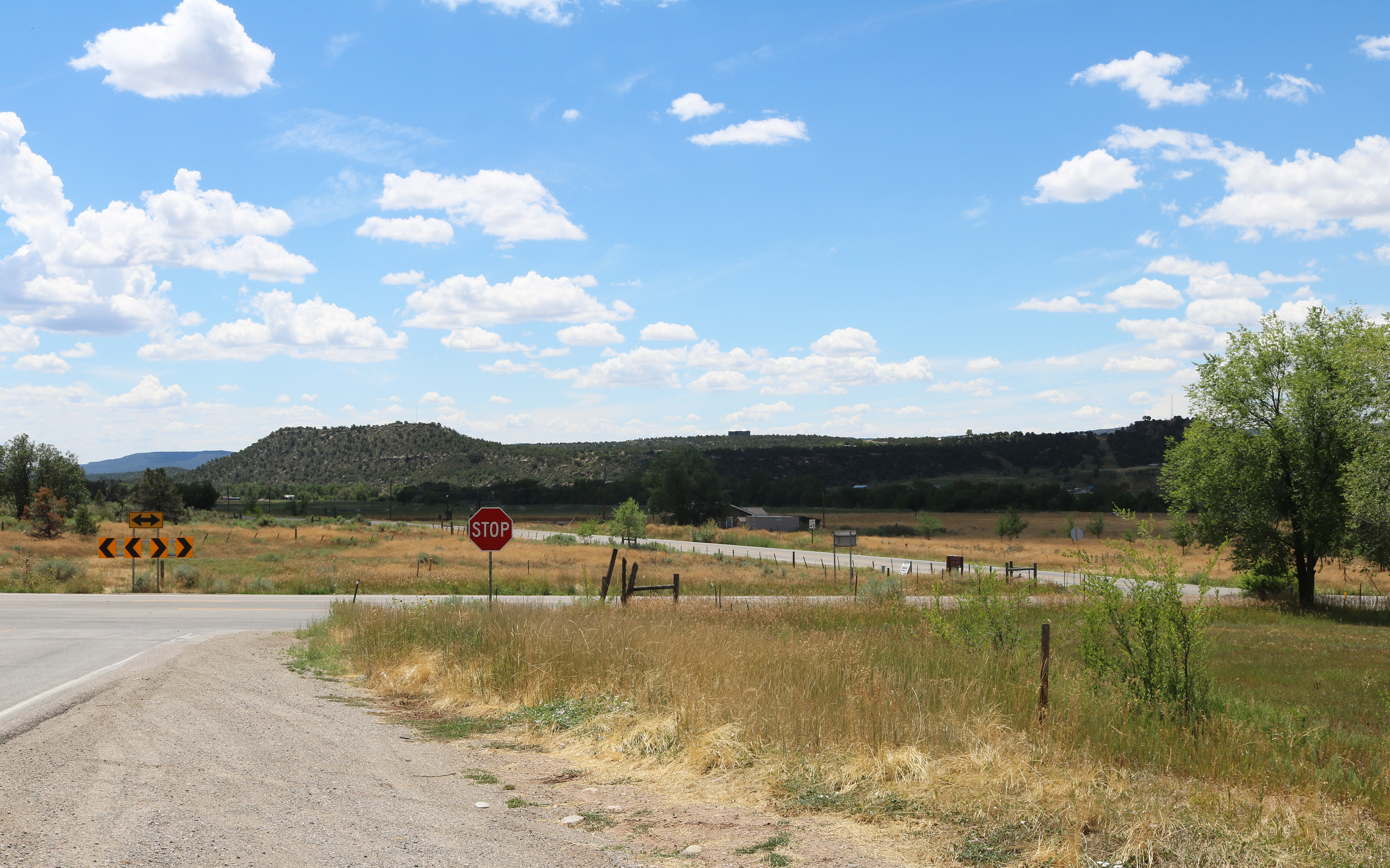
- Southern Ute, south of State Highway 151, August 2019.

- Location of the Southern Ute CDP in La Plata County, Colorado

- Location of the Southern Ute CDP, Colorado. Southern Ute (Colorado)
- Coordinates: 37°05′31″N 107°36′36″W
- Country: United States
- State: Colorado
- County: La Plata County
- Tribe: Southern Ute Indian Tribe

Government
  - Type: Unincorporated community
  - Body: La Plata County

Area
  - Total: 15.960 sq mi (41.335 km^{2})
  - Land: 15.960 sq mi (41.335 km^{2})
  - Water: 0 sq mi (0.000 km^{2})
- Elevation: 6,565 ft (2,001 m)

Population (2020)
  - Total: 158
  - Density: 9.90/sq mi (3.82/km^{2})
- Time zone: UTC−07:00 (MST)
  - Summer (DST): UTC−06:00 (MDT)
- ZIP code: Ignacio 81137
- Area code: 970
- GNIS CDP ID: 2583299
- FIPS code: 08-3925R

Southern Ute is a census-designated place (CDP) on the Southern Ute Indian Reservation in southeastern La Plata County, Colorado, United States. The CDP is a part of the Durango, CO Micropolitan Statistical Area. The population of the Southern Ute CDP was 158 at the United States Census 2020. The Ignacio post office (ZIP Code 81137) now serves the area.

== Etymology ==
Southern Ute is named for the Southern Ute Tribe.

== History ==
The Southern Ute Indian Reservation was created on November 9, 1878. The United States Census Bureau initially defined the Southern Ute CDP for the 2010 United States census.

== Geography ==
At the 2020 United States Census, the Southern Ute CDP had an area of 10,214 acres (41.335 km^{2}), all land.

== Demographics ==
Southern Ute CDP, Colorado
Year	Pop.	±%
2010	177	—
2020	158	−10.7%
Source: United States Census Bureau

== See also ==
- Durango, CO Micropolitan Statistical Area
- Southern Ute Indian Reservation
