= Jimmy Newton =

American politician (1978–2014)

Jimmy R. Newton Jr. (1978 – March 31, 2014) was the tribal chairman of the Southern Ute Indian Reservation in Colorado.

Newton earned a degree in visual graphic design from Collins College, in Phoenix, Arizona. Before being elected tribal chairman in 2012, he served on the tribal council and as vice chairman.

== Notes ==
Preceded by Pearl Casias	Chairman of the Southern Ute Indian Tribe; 2012-2014	Succeeded by Clement Frost
