= Ute Indian Museum =

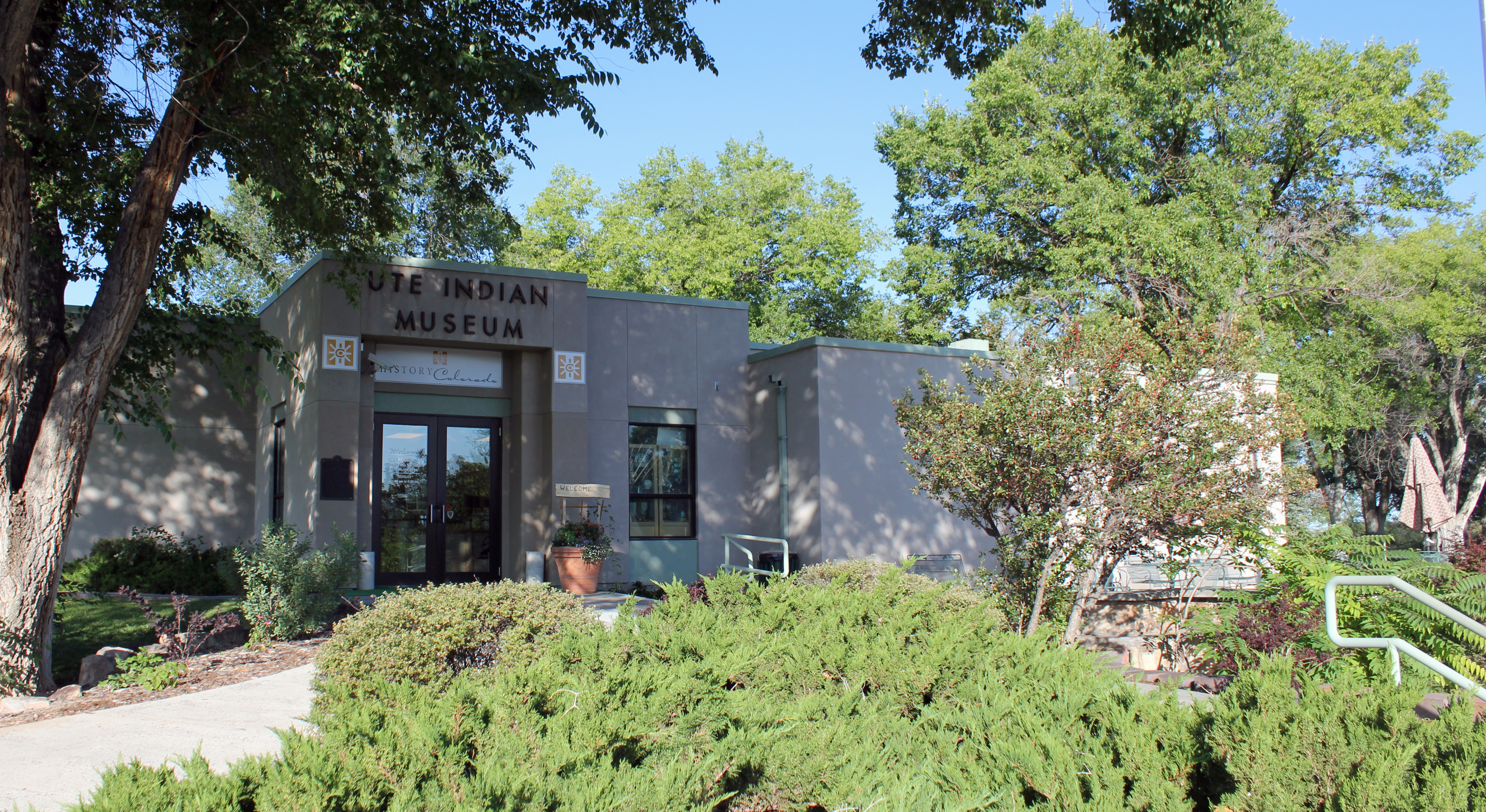
- Established: 1956
- Location: 17253 Chipeta Road; Montrose, Colorado 81403
- Coordinates: 38.4347°N 107.8677°W
- Type: History museum
- Website: Ute Indian Museum

The Ute Indian Museum is a local history museum in Montrose, Colorado, United States. It is administered by History Colorado (the Colorado Historical Society).

The museum presents the history of the Ute tribe of Native Americans. It was built in 1956 and expanded in 1998 and again in 2017. The museum building is located on the 8.65-acre (3.50 ha) homestead of Chief Ouray (c.1833–1880) and his wife, Chipeta (1843/4–1924). The grounds of the museum include the Chief Ouray Memorial Park, Chipeta's Crypt, and a native plants garden.

== See also ==
- Southern Ute Cultural Center and Museum
