= Joseph Rael =

American painter (born 1935)

- Born: Tslew-teh-koyeh; 1935 (age 90–91); Southern Ute Indian Reservation, Colorado, U.S.
- Education: University of New Mexico (BA); University of Wisconsin–Madison (MA)
- Known for: Installation, sound art
- Website: www.josephrael.org

Joseph Rael (Tiwa: Tslew-teh-koyeh: "Beautiful Painted Arrow") (b. 1935) is a Native American ceremonial dancer, shaman, writer, and artist. He is also known as the founder of a global network of Sound Peace Chambers.

== Early life and education ==
Rael was born in 1935 on the Southern Ute Indian Reservation. His father, Alfred Rael (Red Fish), was a Tiwa-speaking native of Picuris Pueblo; his mother, Beatrice Head, was a granddaughter of the Ute chief. The family moved to the Picuris Pueblo near Taos, New Mexico when Joseph was about seven. Here he received the name Tslew-teh-koyeh (Beautiful Painted Arrow). He was educated at the Santa Fe Indian School, and holds a B.A. in political science from the University of New Mexico and an M.A. from the University of Wisconsin–Madison.

== Sound Peace Chambers ==
In 1983, Rael conceived the idea of building a kiva-like structure, which he called a Sound Peace Chamber, "where people of all races might gather to chant and sing for world peace and to purify the earth and oceans". He built the first in Bernalillo, New Mexico. His work inspired others to build a network of Sound Peace Chambers around the world, and there are now such chambers in Australia, Austria, Bolivia, Brazil, Canada, Denmark, England, Germany, Ireland, Norway, Puerto Rico, Scotland and Wales, as well as in the U.S. states of Arizona, Colorado, Georgia, Louisiana, Maine, Michigan, New Mexico, New York, North Carolina, Oklahoma, Pennsylvania, Tennessee, Texas, and Virginia.

== Ceremonial dances ==
Rael also began creating and leading ceremonial dances, which he has taught to people of all nationalities. He wrote that he created three dances: the "Long Dance", the "Sun-Moon Dance", and the "Drum Dance". He retired from active leadership of these dances in 1999.

== Semi-retirement ==
Rael is currently semi-retired and resides on the Southern Ute Indian Reservation in Colorado, where he continues to paint visionary art. His art has been shown in galleries in North Carolina, Texas, and Norway.

== Bibliography ==
Rael has written a number of books which are based primarily on the Tiwa world view.

- Beautiful Painted Arrow: Stories and Teachings from the Native American Tradition. Element Books, 1992. ISBN 1-85230-310-7
- Being and Vibration, with Mary E. Marlow. Council Oak Books, 1993. ISBN 0-933031-72-6; 2003 reprint. ISBN 978-1-57178-119-2
- Tracks of Dancing Light: A Native American Approach to Understanding Your Name. Element Books, 1994. ISBN 1-85230-434-0
- The Way of Inspiration: Teachings of Native American Elder Joseph Rael. Council Oak Books, 1996. ISBN 1-57178-034-3
- Ceremonies of the Living Spirit. Council Oak Books, 1997. ISBN 1-57178-055-6
- House of Shattering Light: Life as an American Indian Mystic. Council Oak Books, 2003. ISBN 978-1-57178-127-7
- Sound: Native Teachings and Visionary Art of Joseph Rael. Council Oak Books, 2009. ISBN 978-1-57178-186-4
- Walking the Medicine Wheel: Healing Trauma and PTSD. Millichap Books/Pointer Oak, 2016. ISBN 978-1-93746-232-1
- Becoming Medicine: Pathways of Initiation into a Living Spirituality. Condor & Eagle Press, 2020. ISBN 978-1-73428-001-2
- Becoming Who You Are: Beautiful Painted Arrow's Life & Lessons for Children Ages 10–100. Condor & Eagle Press, 2021. ISBN 978-1-73428-002-9

== See also ==
- List of Native American artists
- Visual arts by indigenous peoples of the Americas
