= Pearl Casias =

Southern Ute Indian tribal judge

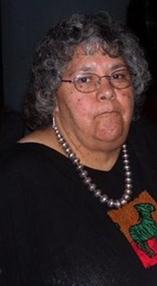
Pearl Casias at Colorado State University, Native American Cultural Center

Pearl Casias is a member of the Southern Ute Indian Tribal Council and former Tribal Judge. In 2011, she was elected to be the first female Chairperson of the Southern Ute Tribal Council.

== Career ==
In 2011 Casias was elected as the first chairwoman in the history of the Southern Ute Tribal council; a symbol of the traditional egalitarian ways the Utes experienced prior to colonization. The special election was held after former Chairman Matthew Box resigned. Clement J. Frost has preceded her as chairperson.

During her term, the Southern Ute Indian Tribe became a major producer of natural gas and received a "AAA" credit rating from national credit rating agencies, the first American Indian Nation to receive the rating.

After her retirement from the Tribal Council, Casias did consulting work for other Native American tribes. In 2018, she exited political retirement to serve an additional term as a member of the Southern Ute Tribal Council.

== See also ==
- List of Native American jurists
- List of Native American politicians
- Native American women in politics

Preceded by Matthew Box	Chairman of the Southern Ute Indian Tribe; 2011	Succeeded by Jimmy Newton
