= Menefee Peak =

Mountain in Colorado, United States

- Location within Colorado

Highest point
- Elevation: 8,832 ft (2,692 m)
- Coordinates: 37°19′35″N 108°14′56″W

Geography
- Location: Montezuma County, Colorado, United States
- Parent range: San Miguel Mountains
- Topo map(s): USGS 7.5' topographic map Thompson Park, Colorado

Climbing
- Easiest route: hike

Menefee Peak is a mountain summit in the southern San Miguel Mountains range of the Rocky Mountains of North America. The 8,832-foot (2,692 m) peak is located 2.9 miles (4.6 km) southeast by east (bearing 119°) of the Town of Mancos in Montezuma County, Colorado, United States. Other surrounding mountain peaks include: Flint Rock Point, Maggie Rock, Weber Mountain, Caviness Mountain, and Red Arrow Dome.

== Historical names ==
- Menefee Peak
- Menete Peak

== See also ==
- List of Colorado mountain ranges
- List of Colorado mountain summits
  - List of Colorado fourteeners
  - List of Colorado 4000 meter prominent summits
  - List of the most prominent summits of Colorado
- List of Colorado county high points
- East Canyon Fire
