= Matthew Box =

Chairman of the Southern Ute Indian Tribe

Matthew James Box (born 1968) is the former chairman of the Southern Ute Indian Tribe in southwestern Colorado, USA. He was elected in 2008 for a three-year term and assumed the chairmanship on 21 December 2008. Box replaced Clement Frost as chairman.

In December 2010, Box faced a recall election amid accusations of mismanagement and fraud, but the required 50% of registered voters did not vote, so the recall failed.

Box resigned from his post as Chairman of the Southern Ute Indian Tribe on February 10, 2011.

Box is the Bear Dance Chief of the Southern Ute Indian Tribe. He is divorced from Hope Box, with whom he has three children, Jakob, Morgann, and Noah.

== Notes ==
Preceded by Clement Frost	Chairman of the Southern Ute Indian Tribe; 2008–2011	Succeeded by Pearl Casias
