= East Canyon Fire =

2020 wildfire in Colorado, United States

- Part of the 2020 Colorado wildfires
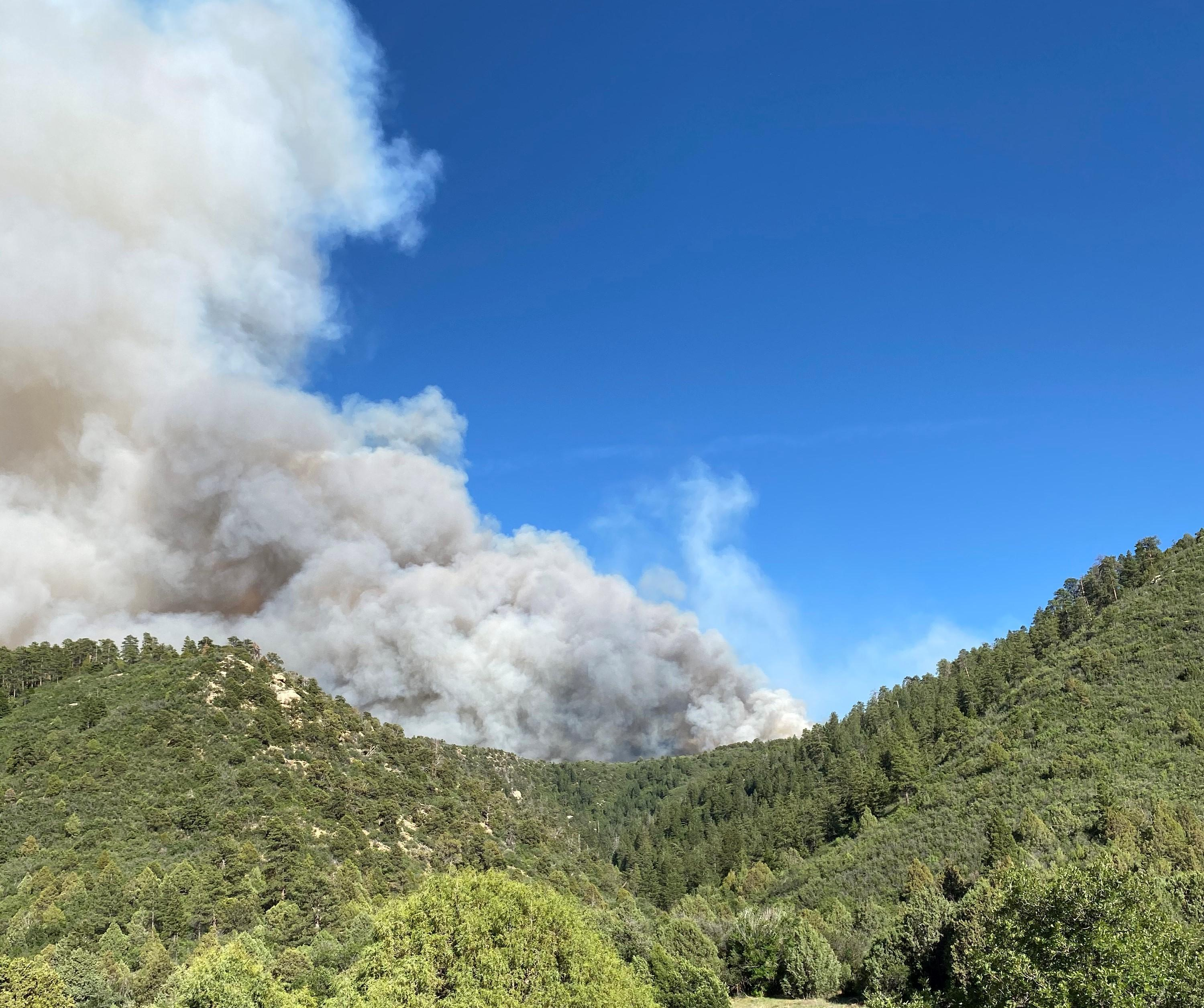
- East Canyon Fire on June 18, 2020
- Date: June 14, 2020–June 27, 2020
- Location: La Plata and Montezuma County, Colorado, United States
- Coordinates: 37.278°N 108.256°W

Statistics
- Burned area: 2,905 acres (1,176 ha)

Ignition
- Cause: Lightning

Map
- Location in Colorado

The East Canyon Fire was a wildfire burning in La Plata and Montezuma Counties in Colorado in the United States. The fire was the largest of many small fires started by a lightning storm and was first reported on June 14, 2020. The East Canyon Fire burned 2,905 acres (1,176 ha) and was contained on June 27, 2020. The fire resulted in the closure a portion of Highway 160 and mandatory evacuations of a campground and residences in the area.

== Events ==
The East Canyon Fire was first reported on June 14, 2020, around 12:41 PM, on a ridge east of Menefee Peak, owned by the Bureau of Land Management (BLM), near Mancos, Colorado. The fire was started by a lightning strike, from a large lightning storm, in a pinyon-juniper forest on a mesa surrounded by numerous canyons. Fueled by pinyon-juniper, Gambel Oak, and grass, the fire was burning in a hard area to reach, requiring fire crews to use aircraft to fight the fire. By the evening the fire had grown to 1,100 acres (445 ha), burning on both BLM and private land in La Plata and Montezuma Counties, specifically on the east side of Weber Canyon and the west side of Cherry Creek. Fire crews focused on keeping the fire east of Highway 46, where it threatened two subdivisions, south of Highway 160, and west of County Road 105. As a result, fifteen homes and the Target Tree Campground were placed under mandatory evacuation.

By the next day, June 15, Red Flag warnings were in place and crews began to secure the western area of the fire, protecting a radio tower and two nearby homes. Due to high winds, the fire moved down the east side of Weber Mountain. In the afternoon, the fire pushed towards Highway 160. It burned one mile south of the highway, resulting in the highway being closed. A Temporary Flight Restriction was also put in place for 10 miles around the fire.

As of the evening of June 16, the fire had burned 2,568 acres (1,039 ha) and crews had reached five percent containment and made significant progress with dozer lines and fire retardant drops. However, the fire kept moving down small canyons and began breaching retardant lines. Two privately owned pieces of equipment and a small privately owned bridge burned. A bear with badly burned feet was tranquilized and transported to a rehab facility.

Two days later, on June 18, the BLM reported that the fire was back to zero containment. The next day, June 19, they reported it was 17 percent contained. This progress was due to light favorable wind conditions. On June 22, all evacuation orders were lifted and all sides of the fire, except the northwest flank, were contained. The fire was contained by June 27, 2020. It burned a total of 2,905 acres (1,176 ha).

== Impact ==
The East Canyon Fire threatened the Elk Springs and Elk Stream subdivisions. The fire's quick runs towards Highway 160 resulted in a portion of the highway being closed from June 15 until June 16. The Target Tree campground was closed and 15 houses were evacuated starting June 14. Evacuation orders were lifted on June 22.

On June 16, fire crews spotted an injured bear walking across a meadow towards a pond in Hesperus. The bear was tranquilized and found to have heavy burns on all four feet. The bear was transported to Frisco Creek Wildlife Rehabilitation Center and will be released back into the wild by August 2020.

== Gallery ==
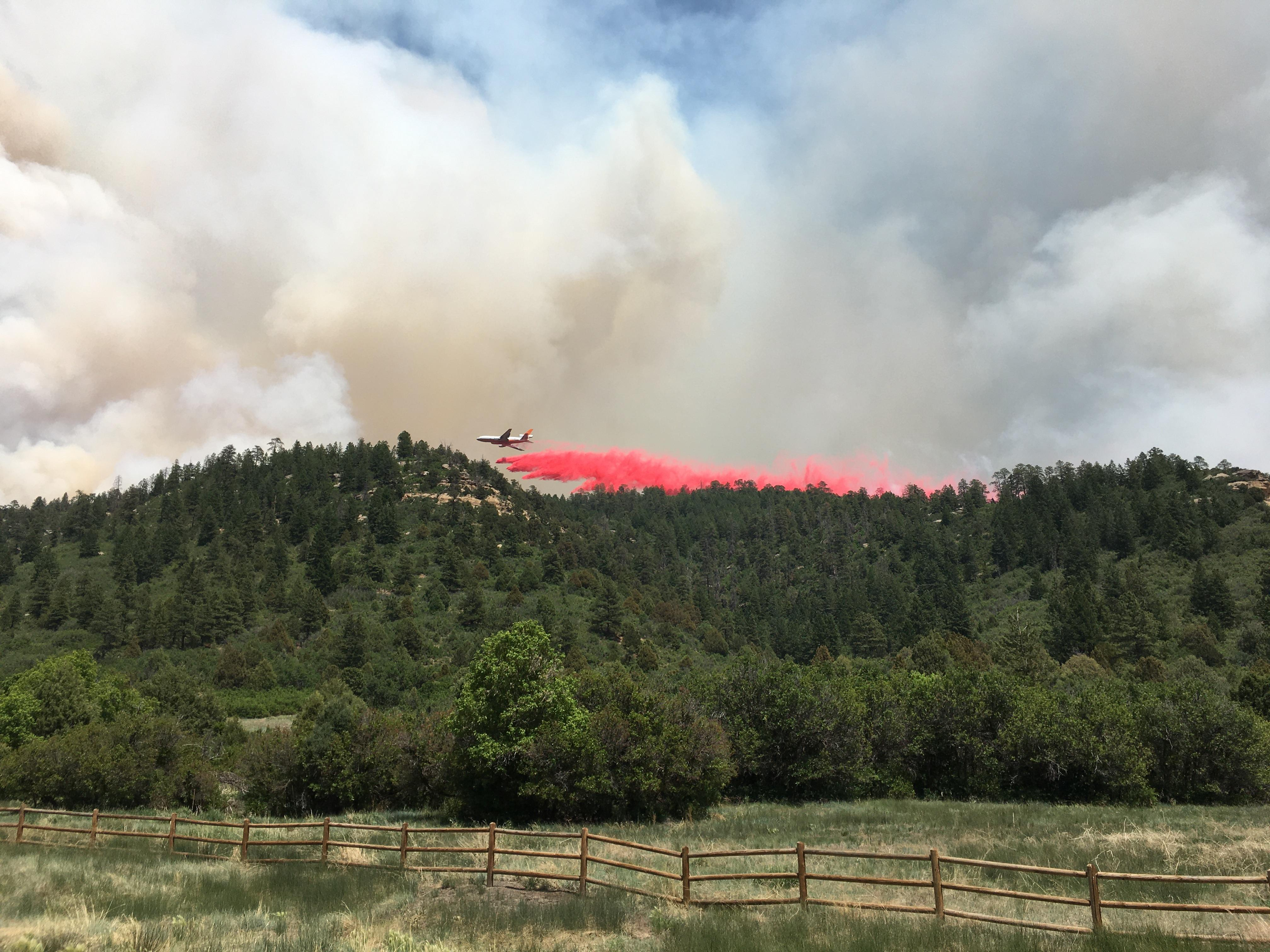
Airplane dropping fire retardant on June 18, 2020

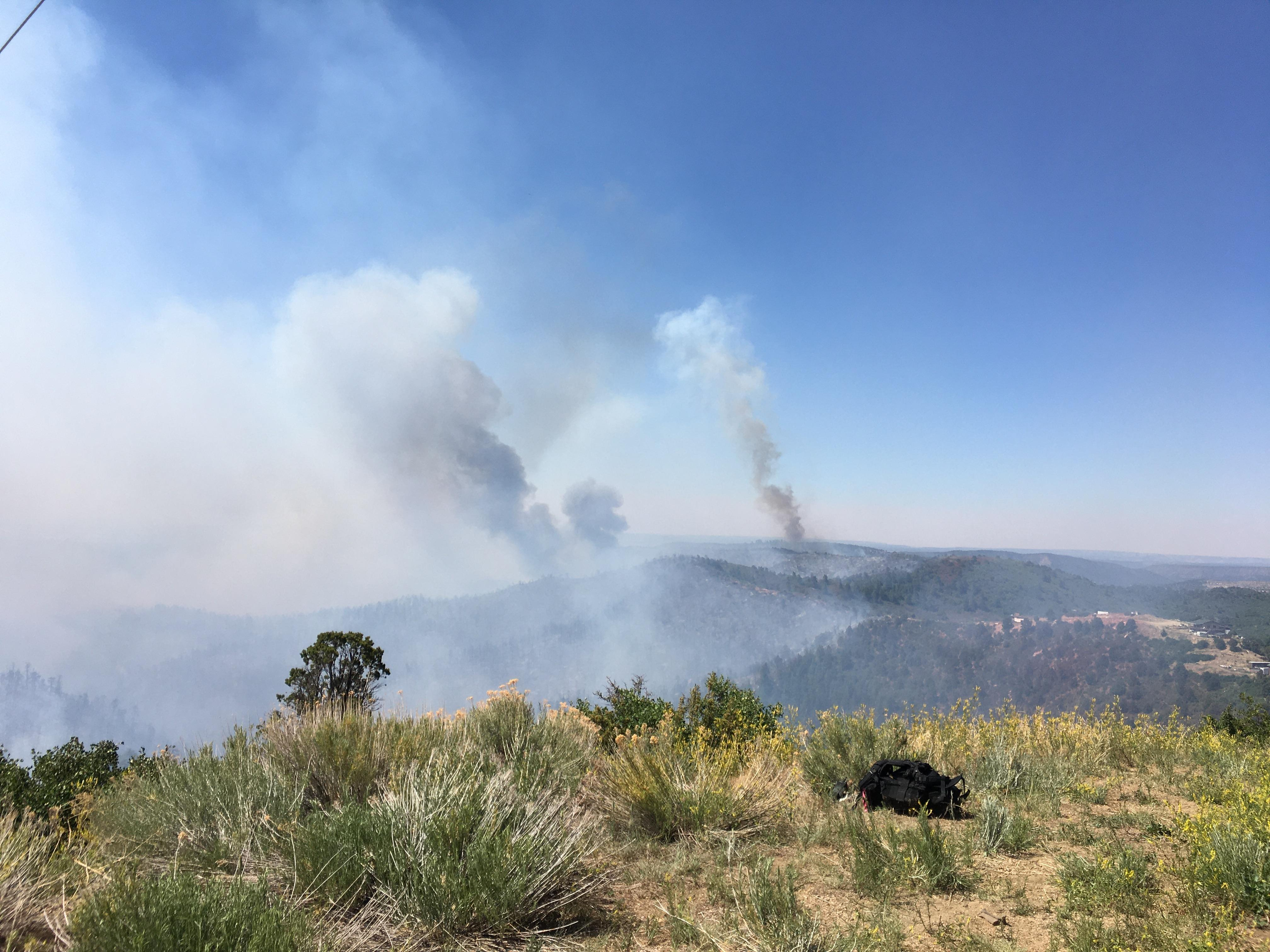
East Canyon Fire on June 18, 2020

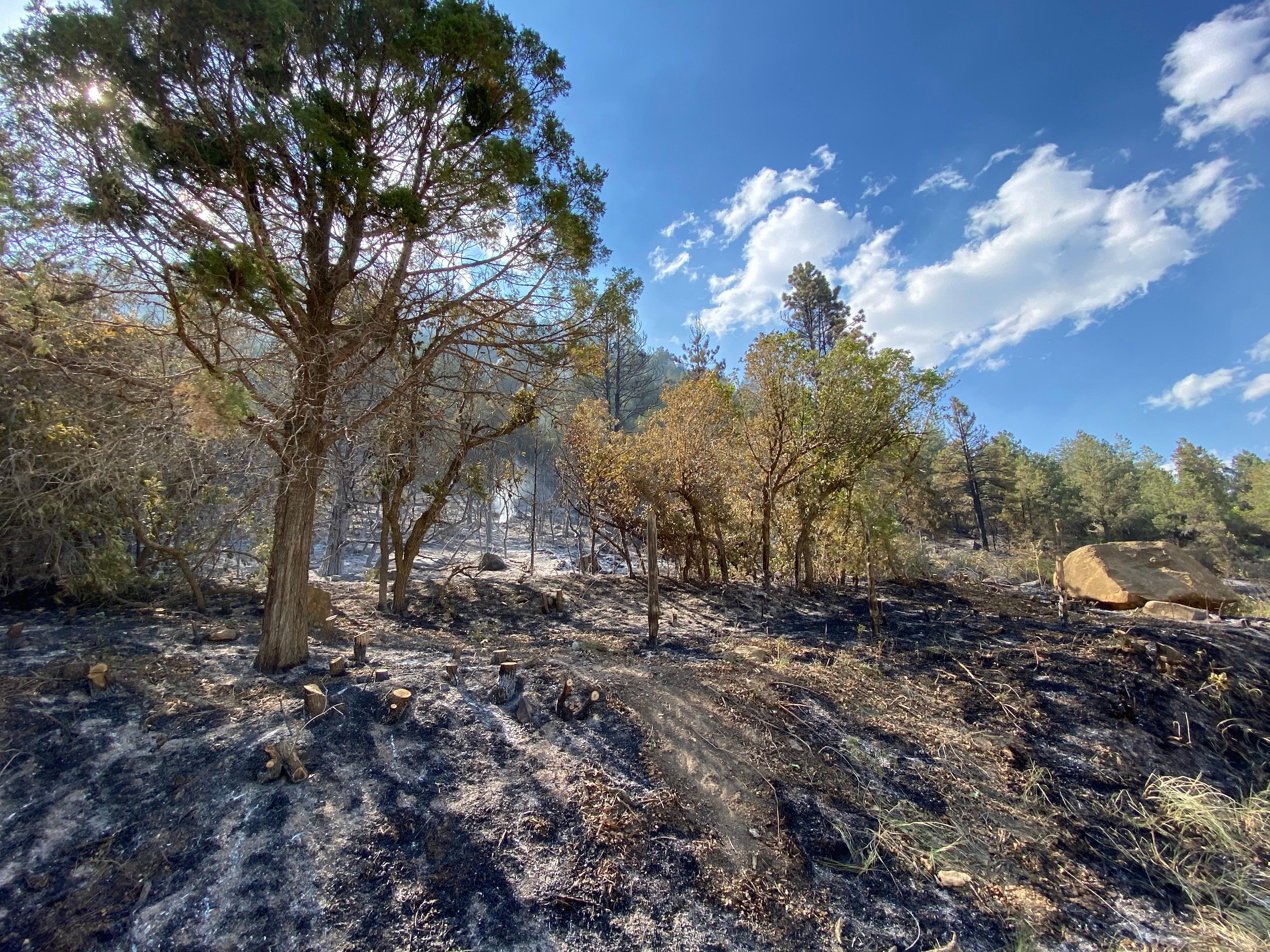
Burn scars from the East Canyon Fire on June 18, 2020

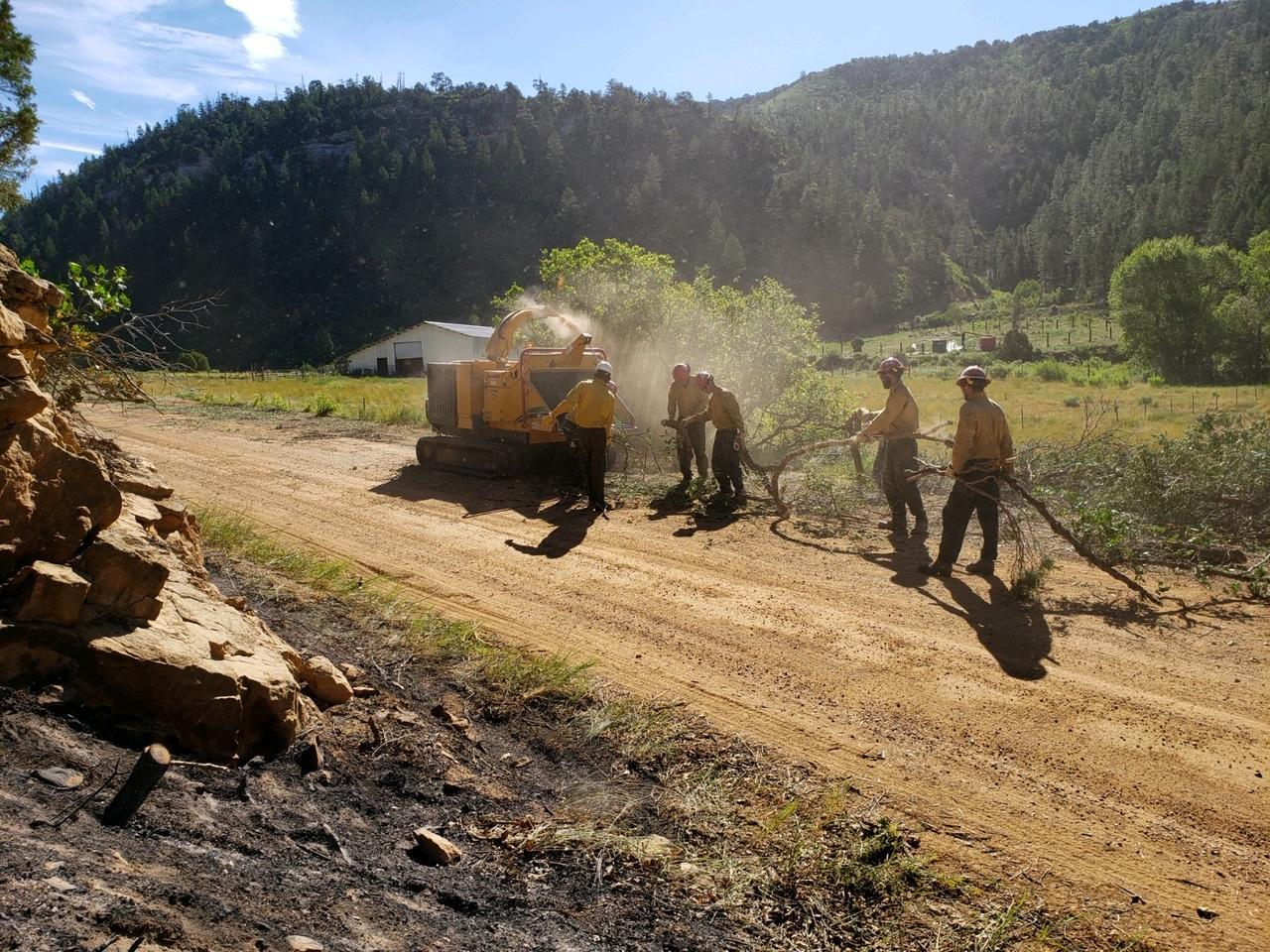
Crews clearing brush on June 21, 2020

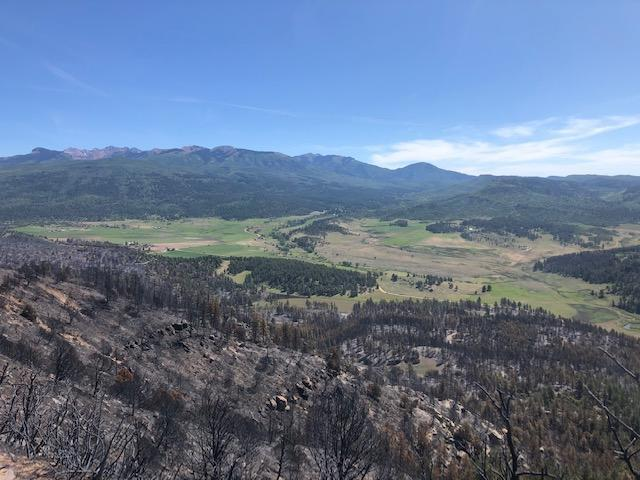
East Canyon Fire's burn scar on the north flank on June 21, 2020

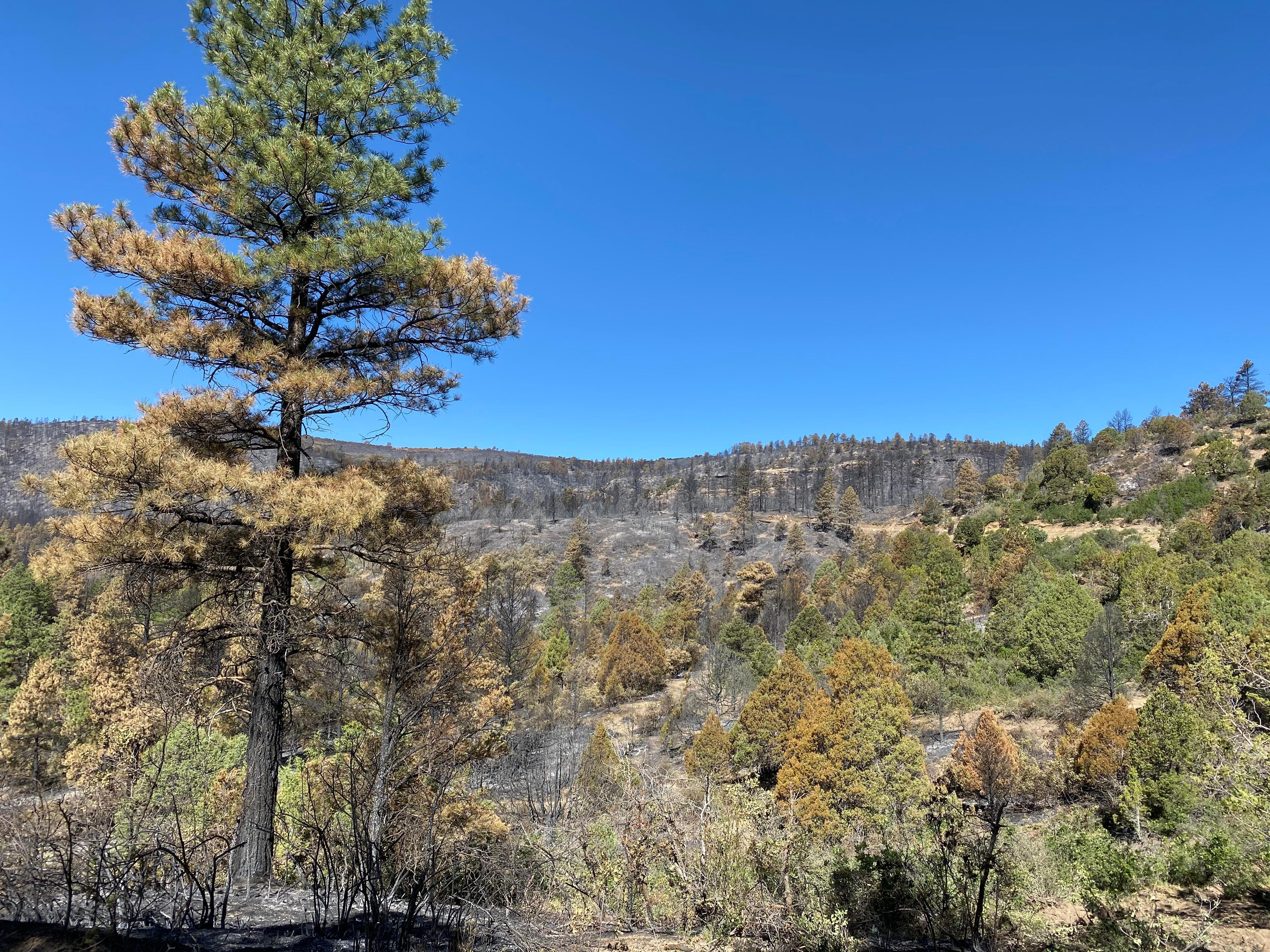
Portion of fire line on June 24, 2020
