= La Plata County, Colorado =

County in Colorado, United States

- County
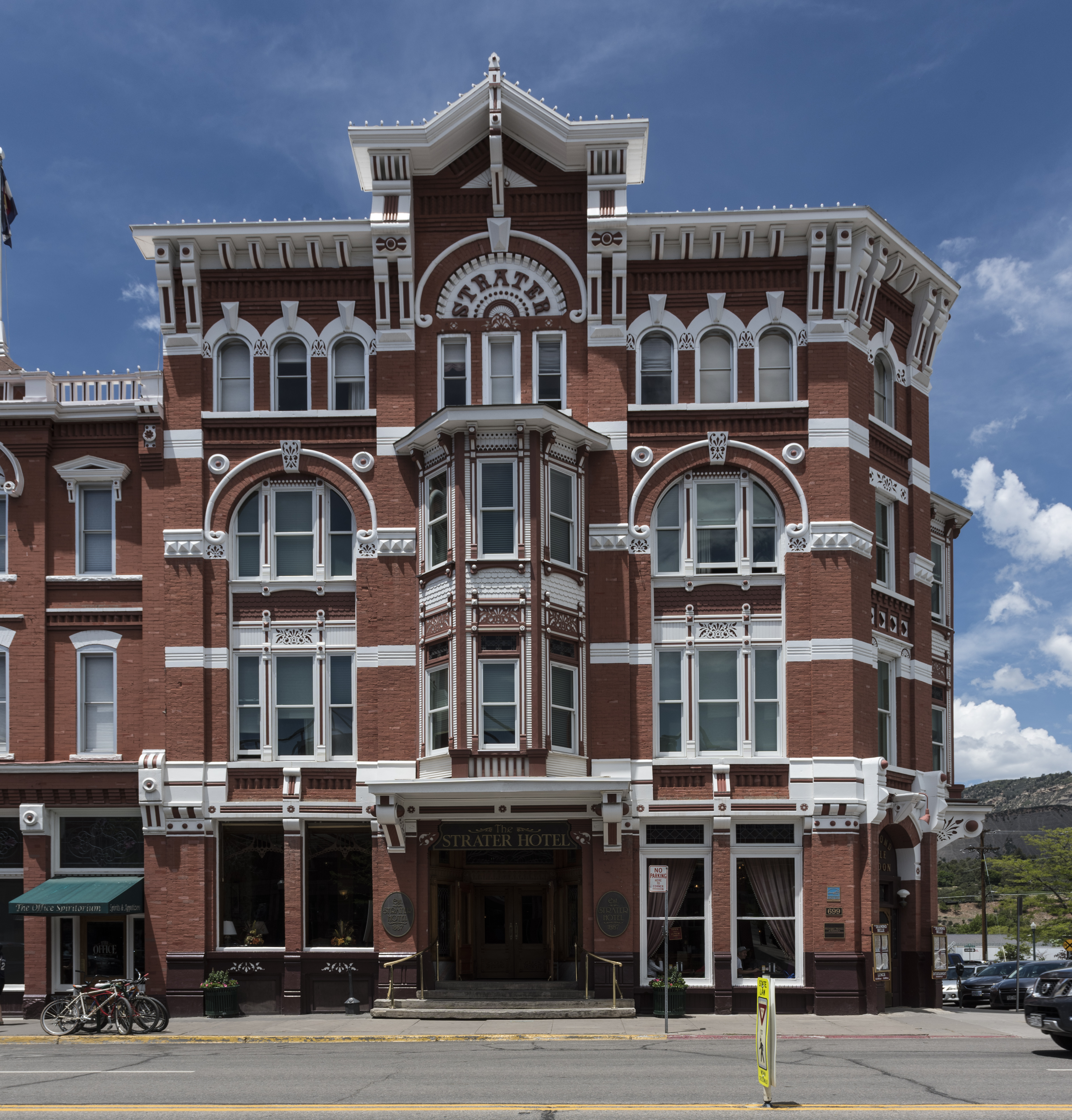
- Strater Hotel, opened in 1888 during a mining boom in Durango.

- Flag Seal Logo

- Location within the U.S. state of Colorado
- Coordinates: 37.29°N 107.85°W
- Country: United States
- State: Colorado
- Founded: February 10, 1874
- Named for: Spanish for "the silver"
- Seat: Durango
- Largest city: Durango

Area
  - Total: 1,700 sq mi (4,400 km^{2})
  - Land: 1,692 sq mi (4,380 km^{2})
  - Water: 7.6 sq mi (20 km^{2}) 0.4%

Population (2020)
  - Total: 55,638
  - Estimate (2025): 56,898 ▲
  - Density: 32.88/sq mi (12.70/km^{2})
- Time zone: UTC−7 (Mountain)
  - Summer (DST): UTC−6 (MDT)
- Congressional district: 3rd
- Website: www.lpcgov.org

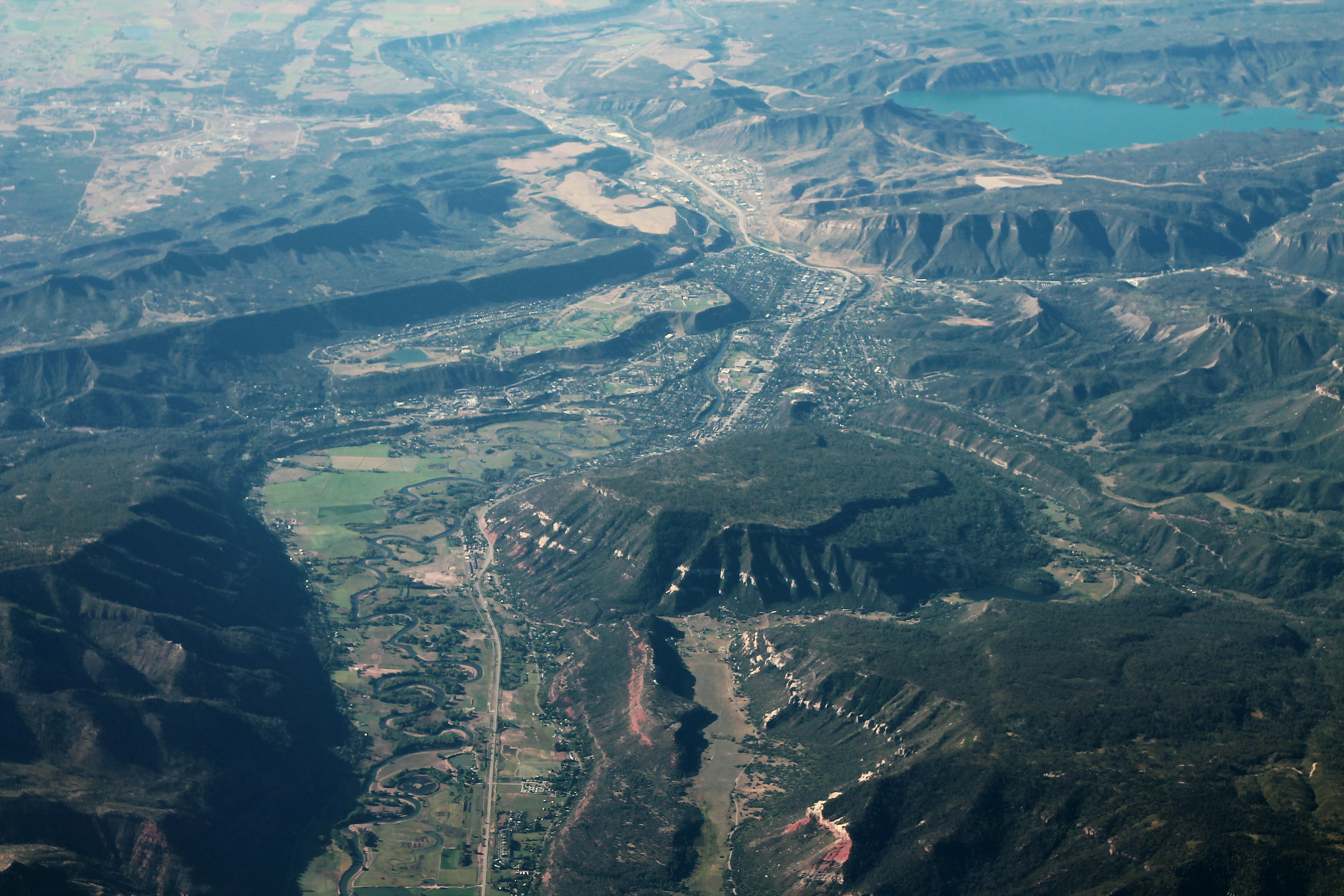
Aerial view of Durango and the surrounding area

La Plata County is a county located in the U.S. state of Colorado. As of the 2020 census, the population was 55,638. The county seat is Durango. The county was named for the La Plata River and the La Plata Mountains. "La plata" means "the silver" in Spanish. La Plata County comprises the Durango, CO Micropolitan Statistical Area. The county is home to Durango Rock Shelters Archeology Site, the type site for the Basketmaker II period of Anasazi culture.

The Durango micropolitan area is a United States Census Bureau defined micropolitan statistical area located around the city of Durango and is coterminous with the county. The Durango micropolitan statistical area includes the City of Durango, the Town of Bayfield, the Town of Ignacio, and the unincorporated areas of the county.

== Geography ==
According to the U.S. Census Bureau, the county has a total area of 1,700 square miles (4,400 km^{2}), of which 1,692 square miles (4,380 km^{2}) is land and 7.6 square miles (20 km^{2}) (0.4%) is water.

=== Adjacent counties ===
- San Juan County - north
- Hinsdale County - northeast
- Archuleta County - east
- San Juan County, New Mexico - south
- Montezuma County - west
- Dolores County - northwest

=== Major highways ===
- U.S. Highway 160
- U.S. Highway 550
- State Highway 140
- State Highway 151
- State Highway 172

== Demographics ==
Historical population
Census	Pop.	Note	%±
1880	1,110		—
1890	5,509		396.3%
1900	7,016		27.4%
1910	10,812		54.1%
1920	11,218		3.8%
1930	12,975		15.7%
1940	15,494		19.4%
1950	14,880		−4.0%
1960	19,225		29.2%
1970	19,199		−0.1%
1980	27,424		42.8%
1990	32,284		17.7%
2000	43,941		36.1%
2010	51,334		16.8%
2020	55,638		8.4%
2025 (est.)	56,898	▲	2.3%
U.S. Decennial Census; 1790-1960 1900-1990; 1990-2000 2010-2020

It had a population of 43,941 at the 2000 Census, with a U.S. Census Bureau estimate dated July 1, 2009, placed the population at 51,464.

=== 2020 census ===
As of the 2020 census, the county had a population of 55,638. Of the residents, 18.6% were under the age of 18 and 19.8% were 65 years of age or older; the median age was 41.7 years. For every 100 females there were 103.3 males, and for every 100 females age 18 and over there were 101.9 males. 34.4% of residents lived in urban areas and 65.6% lived in rural areas.

La Plata County, Colorado – Racial and ethnic composition Note: the US Census treats Hispanic/Latino as an ethnic category. This table excludes Latinos from the racial categories and assigns them to a separate category. Hispanics/Latinos may be of any race.
Race / Ethnicity (NH = Non-Hispanic)	Pop 2000	Pop 2010	Pop 2020	% 2000	% 2010	% 2020
White alone (NH)	36,168	41,245	42,392	82.31%	80.35%	76.19%
Black or African American alone (NH)	120	176	182	0.27%	0.34%	0.33%
Native American or Alaska Native alone (NH)	2,205	2,554	2,809	5.02%	4.98%	5.05%
Asian alone (NH)	174	266	381	0.40%	0.52%	0.68%
Pacific Islander alone (NH)	21	30	33	0.05%	0.06%	0.06%
Other race alone (NH)	102	58	377	0.23%	0.11%	0.68%
Mixed race or Multiracial (NH)	580	949	2,456	1.32%	1.85%	4.41%
Hispanic or Latino (any race)	4,571	6,056	7,008	10.40%	11.80%	12.60%
Total	43,941	51,334	55,638	100.00%	100.00%	100.00%

The racial makeup of the county was 79.7% White, 0.4% Black or African American, 6.0% American Indian and Alaska Native, 0.7% Asian, 0.1% Native Hawaiian and Pacific Islander, 4.1% from some other race, and 9.0% from two or more races. Hispanic or Latino residents of any race comprised 12.6% of the population.

There were 23,487 households in the county, of which 25.6% had children under the age of 18 living with them and 23.2% had a female householder with no spouse or partner present. About 28.3% of all households were made up of individuals and 11.3% had someone living alone who was 65 years of age or older.

There were 28,198 housing units, of which 16.7% were vacant. Among occupied housing units, 67.2% were owner-occupied and 32.8% were renter-occupied. The homeowner vacancy rate was 2.1% and the rental vacancy rate was 7.3%.

=== 2000 census ===
As of the 2000 census, there were 43,941 people in the county, organized into 17,342 households and 10,890 families. The population density was 26 people per square mile (10 people/km^{2}). There were 20,765 housing units at an average density of 12 units per square mile (4.6 units/km^{2}). The racial makeup of the county was 87.31% White, 5.78% Native American, 0.40% Asian, 0.31% Black or African American, 0.05% Pacific Islander, 3.90% from other races, and 2.25% from two or more races. 10.40% of the population were Hispanic or Latino of any race.

There were 17,342 households, out of which 29.60% had children under the age of 18 living with them, 49.90% were married couples living together, 8.70% had a female householder with no husband present, and 37.20% were non-families. 24.80% of all households were made up of individuals, and 6.10% had someone living alone who was 65 years of age or older. The average household size was 2.43 and the average family size was 2.92.

In the county, the population was spread out, with 22.70% under the age of 18, 13.90% from 18 to 24, 29.00% from 25 to 44, 25.10% from 45 to 64, and 9.40% who were 65 years of age or older. The median age was 36 years. For every 100 females there were 103.60 males. For every 100 females age 18 and over, there were 103.10 males.

The median income for a household in the county was $40,159, and the median income for a family was $50,446. Males had a median income of $32,486 versus $24,666 for females. The per capita income for the county was $21,534. 11.70% of the population and 6.70% of families were below the poverty line. Out of the total population, 9.30% of those under the age of 18 and 7.70% of those 65 and older were living below the poverty line.

== Communities ==
=== City ===
- Durango

=== Towns ===
- Bayfield
- Ignacio

=== Census-designated place ===
- Marvel
- Southern Ute

=== Other unincorporated communities ===
- Allison
- Bondad
- Breen
- Falfa
- Gem Village
- Hermosa
- Hesperus
- Kline
- Mayday
- Oxford
- Redmesa
- Tiffany

=== Ghost towns ===
- Greysill Mines
- La Plata
- Parrott City

== Politics ==
In its early years La Plata County generally leaned towards the Democratic Party. Only Benjamin Harrison in 1888, and the three landslide victories of Theodore Roosevelt, Warren G. Harding and Herbert Hoover saw the county vote Republican before World War II. In the period between 1940 and 1988, however, the county – like Colorado generally – took a turn towards supporting the Republican Party, with the result that between 1940 and 2000 the only Democrat to obtain a majority in the county was Lyndon Johnson in 1964. Since John Kerry became the first candidate in sixteen years from either party to gain a majority in La Plata County in the 2004 election, the county has tended towards the Democratic Party: Barack Obama's 2008 share of the vote was the highest for a Democrat since Woodrow Wilson's 92 years prior. In the 2020 election, Democrat Joe Biden handily won majority of the vote in the county, with a higher share of the vote than the previous presidential elections, and this trend continued even further in the 2024 election, with Kamala Harris receiving the highest percentage of the vote for a Democratic candidate since 1916.

United States presidential election results for La Plata County, Colorado
Year	Republican		Democratic		Third party(ies)	
Year	No.	%	No.	%	No.	%
1880	259	42.88%	345	57.12%	0	0.00%
1884	722	51.02%	629	44.45%	64	4.52%
1888	849	51.11%	774	46.60%	38	2.29%
1892	545	33.58%	0	0.00%	1,078	66.42%
1896	91	3.22%	2,729	96.57%	6	0.21%
1900	900	32.50%	1,844	66.59%	25	0.90%
1904	1,745	51.13%	1,458	42.72%	210	6.15%
1908	1,381	36.80%	2,004	53.40%	368	9.81%
1912	692	19.44%	1,775	49.86%	1,093	30.70%
1916	1,029	27.07%	2,590	68.14%	182	4.79%
1920	1,711	50.85%	1,445	42.94%	209	6.21%
1924	1,469	35.13%	1,516	36.25%	1,197	28.62%
1928	2,837	59.58%	1,872	39.31%	53	1.11%
1932	2,124	38.50%	3,156	57.21%	237	4.30%
1936	2,354	42.19%	3,040	54.49%	185	3.32%
1940	3,871	57.39%	2,835	42.03%	39	0.58%
1944	3,023	59.64%	2,031	40.07%	15	0.30%
1948	2,735	51.03%	2,536	47.31%	89	1.66%
1952	4,425	66.03%	2,210	32.98%	66	0.98%
1956	4,770	66.81%	2,366	33.14%	4	0.06%
1960	4,772	58.83%	3,329	41.04%	10	0.12%
1964	3,550	44.34%	4,442	55.48%	15	0.19%
1968	4,269	57.10%	2,523	33.75%	684	9.15%
1972	5,691	62.24%	2,830	30.95%	623	6.81%
1976	6,228	59.05%	3,843	36.44%	476	4.51%
1980	7,291	59.76%	3,034	24.87%	1,876	15.38%
1984	8,719	67.49%	4,040	31.27%	159	1.23%
1988	7,714	57.73%	5,443	40.73%	205	1.53%
1992	5,522	35.37%	5,913	37.87%	4,178	26.76%
1996	8,057	46.52%	6,509	37.58%	2,755	15.91%
2000	9,993	48.77%	7,864	38.38%	2,633	12.85%
2004	11,704	45.87%	13,409	52.56%	400	1.57%
2008	11,503	41.11%	16,057	57.39%	419	1.50%
2012	12,794	43.65%	15,489	52.85%	1,025	3.50%
2016	12,587	40.41%	15,525	49.84%	3,038	9.75%
2020	14,233	39.91%	20,548	57.61%	886	2.48%
2024	14,024	39.29%	20,677	57.93%	991	2.78%

United States Senate election results for La Plata County, Colorado2
Year	Republican		Democratic		Third party(ies)	
Year	No.	%	No.	%	No.	%
2020	14,776	41.68%	19,873	56.05%	804	2.27%

United States Senate election results for La Plata County, Colorado3
Year	Republican		Democratic		Third party(ies)	
Year	No.	%	No.	%	No.	%
2022	11,231	37.78%	17,711	59.57%	787	2.65%

Colorado Gubernatorial election results for La Plata County
Year	Republican		Democratic		Third party(ies)	
Year	No.	%	No.	%	No.	%
2022	10,689	35.99%	18,350	61.78%	665	2.24%

== Recreation ==
=== National forest and wilderness ===
- San Juan National Forest
- Weminuche Wilderness

=== National historic district ===
- Durango-Silverton Narrow-Gauge Railroad National Historic District

=== Trails ===
- Colorado Trail
- Old Spanish National Historic Trail

=== Bicycle route ===
- Great Parks Bicycle Route

=== Scenic byway ===
- San Juan Skyway National Scenic Byway

== Education ==
=== Public Education ===
==== Durango School District 9-R ====
Elementary Schools

- Animas Valley Elementary School
- Florida Mesa Elementary School
- Fort Lewis Mesa Elementary School
- Needham Elementary School
- Park Elementary School
- Riverview Elementary School
- Sunnyside Elementary School

Middle Schools

- Escalante Middle School
- Miller Middle School

High Schools

- Durango High School
- Durango Big Picture High School

==== Bayfield School District ====
Elementary Schools

- Bayfield Primary School
- Bayfield Intermediate School

Middle School

- Bayfield Middle School

High School

- Bayfield High School

==== Ignacio School District 11-JT ====
Elementary School

- Ignacio Elementary School

Middle School

- Ignacio Middle School

High School

- Ignacio High School

== See also ==
- Bibliography of Colorado
- Geography of Colorado
- History of Colorado
  - East Canyon Fire
  - National Register of Historic Places listings in La Plata County, Colorado
- Index of Colorado-related articles
- List of Colorado-related lists
  - List of counties in Colorado
  - List of statistical areas in Colorado
- Outline of Colorado
