= Southern Ute Indian Reservation =

Indian reservation in United States

Southern Ute Indian Reservation Kapuuta-wa Moghwachi Núuchi-u
- Indian reservation
- Seal
- Location in Colorado
- Coordinates: 37°06′30″N 107°38′42″W
- Tribe: Southern Ute
- Country: United States
- State: Colorado
- Counties: La Plata; Archuleta; Montezuma Counties
- Headquarters: Ignacio

Government
  - Body: Tribal Council
  - Chairman: Christine Sage
  - Vice-Chairman: Marjorie Barry
  - Treasurer: James Mike Olguin

Population (2020)
  - Total: 12,321
- Website: southernute-nsn.gov

The Southern Ute Indian Reservation (Ute dialect: Kapuuta-wa Moghwachi Núuchi-u) is an Indian reservation in southwestern Colorado, United States, near the northern New Mexico state line. Its territory consists of land from three counties; in descending order of surface area they are La Plata, Archuleta, and Montezuma Counties. The reservation has a land area of 1,058.785 sq mi (2,742.24 km²). Its largest communities are Ignacio and Arboles. The only other community that is recognized as a separate place by the Census Bureau is the CDP of Southern Ute, which lies just southeast of Ignacio.

== History ==
=== Historic bands ===
The Southern Ute Indian Tribes is made up of the followings bands: the Mouache, Capote, and the Weeminuche, the latter of which are at Ute Mountain. These bands were considered the Southern Utes.

==== Capote ====
The Capote (Kapuuta Núuchi, Kapota, Kahpota) band lived east of the Great Divide south of the Conejos River and east of the Rio Grande towards the west site of the Sangre de Cristo Mountains, they were also living in the San Luis Valley, along the headwaters of the Rio Grande and along the Animas River, centered in the vicinity of today Chama and Tierra Amarilla of Rio Arriba County. Like the Mahgrahch the Kahpota maintained trade relations to Puebloan peoples and came into conflict with southern plains people because of their alliance with the Ollero band of the Jicarilla Apache.

==== Muache ====
The Muache ( Moghwachi Núuchi, Mouache, Mahgruhch, Mahgrahch, Muwac) band lived along the eastern foothills of the Rocky Mountains from Denver in the north to Las Vegas, New Mexico, in the south, traded with northern Puebloan peoples, especially with Taos Pueblo, therefore often called Taos-Ute, ranged after adoption of the horse with their allies, the Llanero band of the Jicarilla Apache, southeastward as far as the Texas Panhandle.

=== Treaties with the U.S. government ===
Ouray of the Uncompahgre band was appointed by President Abraham Lincoln as head of all Ute tribes, which was not agreed upon by the Southern Ute bands. The first reservation created by the treaty of 1868 encompassed about 1/3 of present-day Colorado, mostly the mountainous regions west of the continental divide. When precious metals and minerals were discovered in the central mountains settlers sought access to the land. In 1873 The Brunot Agreement was created. This agreement limited the reservation to the narrow strip of land that is called The Southern Ute Reservation today. The United States also made treaties with various bands of Ute in 1855, 1865, and 1866, which the Senate failed to ratify. Initially given the whole of western Colorado for a reservation, the discovery of gold there in the 1860s brought a quick reduction in territory. The treaty with the Ute in 1865 provided for the cession of land in exchange for the entire valley of the Uintah River in Utah, plus $25,000 per year for ten years, then $20,000 for 20 years, and thereafter $15,000 per year, based on an estimated population of 5,000 Ute. The treaty also banned liquor and provided for the establishment and maintenance of a manual labor school for ten years.

In 1895 The Hunter Act distributed the land in the reservation in plots to the heads of households in the Mouache and Capote tribes. The Weeminuche tribe had approved an 1888 congressional bill relocating them to San Juan County, Utah, however this bill did not pass so the Weeminuche were brought back to Colorado. They refused to go back to the old grounds of the agency so they established camps on the western end of the Southern Ute Reservation. With the three tribes given their land the final provisions of the Hunter Act were implemented opening over 500,000 acres (200,000 ha) of the Reservation to non-native settlers.

== Description ==
Map of the Southern Ute Reservation and nearby reservations.

The Southern Ute Indian Reservation was opened in southwestern Colorado. The eastern part of the reservation is forest with elevations of more than 9,000 feet (2,700 m). The western portion is mostly arid mesa. The land lies in the southwestern corner of the state of Colorado and consists of a strip 15 miles (24 km) north to south and 110 miles (180 km) east to west.

== Census ==
Census population in Southern Ute Reservation in 1980 and 20 years later, 2000.

- Southern Ute Reservation 1980 | 2000
- Archuleta County 2,257 | 4,796
- La Plata County 259 | 695
- Montezuma County 1,998 | 4,101

== Governance ==
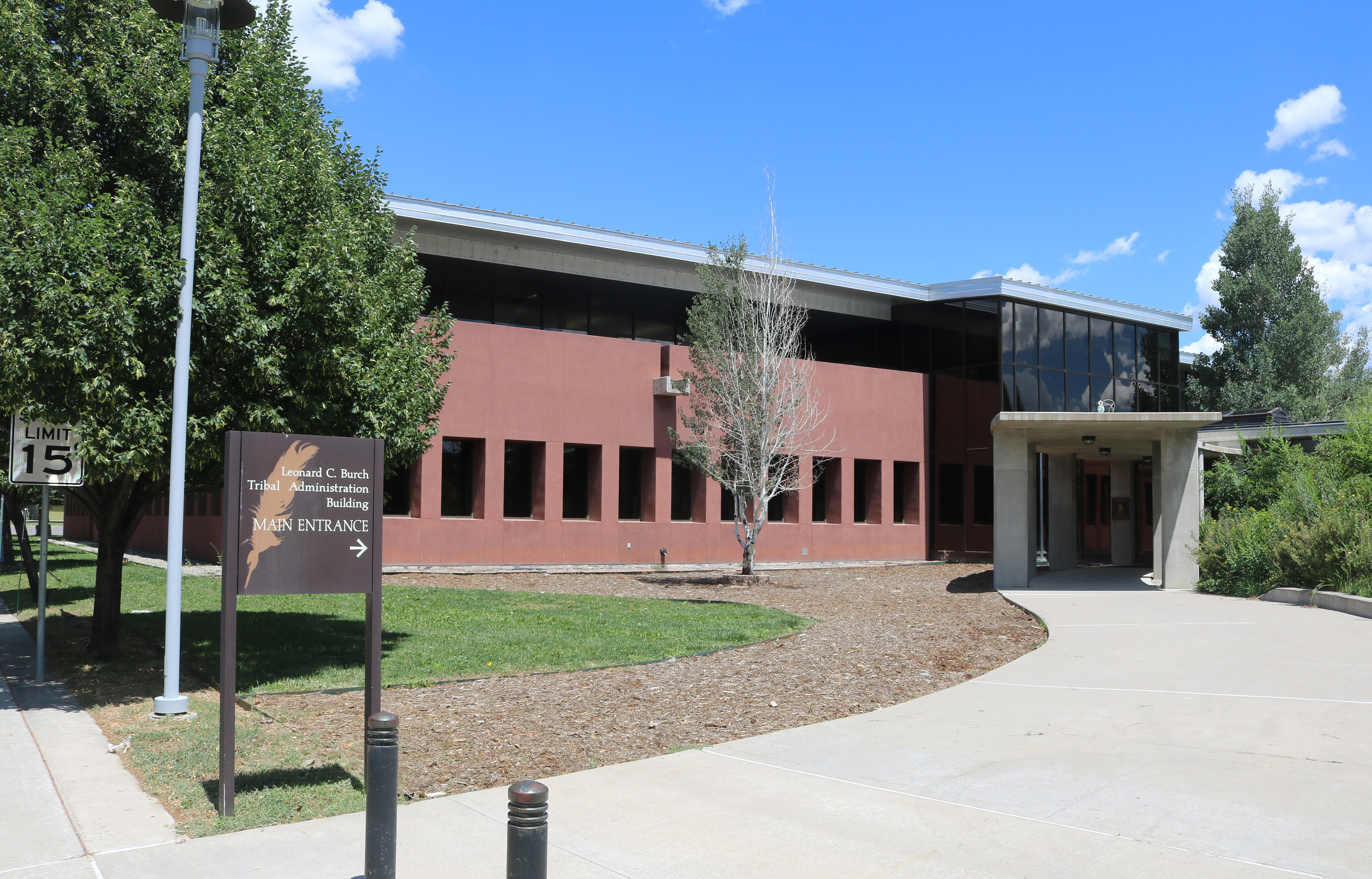
The Southern Ute Tribal Administration Building

The reservation of the Southern Ute Indian Tribe, a federally recognized Ute tribe, was established in 1873. The southern Utes are made up of two bands, the Mouache and the Capote. Government is organized under the Indian Reorganization Act of 1934 and is led by a tribal council with a chairman as head of the executive. For decades at the end of the 20th century, Leonard C. Burch had been the tribes' chairman. In 2008 a new chairman, Matthew Box, was elected. Matthew Box resigned as Tribal Chairman in 2011. Under a special election Pearl Casias was elected as the first Chairwoman in the history of the Tribe and served for a time in 2011. Jimmy Newton served as Tribal Chairman from 2012 until his death in 2014. Clement Frost served as Tribal Chairman following Newton's death in 2014. Frost retired in 2017, and in December 2017 Christine Baker-Sage was elected to serve as Tribal Chairwoman. In December 2020, Melvin J. Baker was elected Tribal Chairman.

== Economy ==
The Southern Ute Indian Tribe’s coalbed methane capture project reduced greenhouse gas emissions by the equivalent of about 379,000 metric tons of carbon dioxide between 2009 and 2017. Conventional coalbed methane production wells were not economically feasible in this location due to the low volume of seepage. The project delivers its gas to natural gas pipelines, and generates additional revenue through the sale of carbon offsets.

== Notable people ==
- Joseph Rael, (b. 1935), dancer, author, and spiritualist
- Sapiah (1840–1936), Ute chief from about 1870 until his death in 1936

== See also ==
- Bibliography of Colorado
- Geography of Colorado
- History of Colorado
- Index of Colorado-related articles
- List of Colorado-related lists
- Outline of Colorado
- Ute people
  - Capote Band of Utes
  - Muache Band of Utes
  - Uintah and Ouray Indian Reservation
  - Ute Mountain Ute Tribe
