= Ignacio, Colorado =

Town in Colorado, United States

Ignacio, Colorado Piinuu
- Statutory town
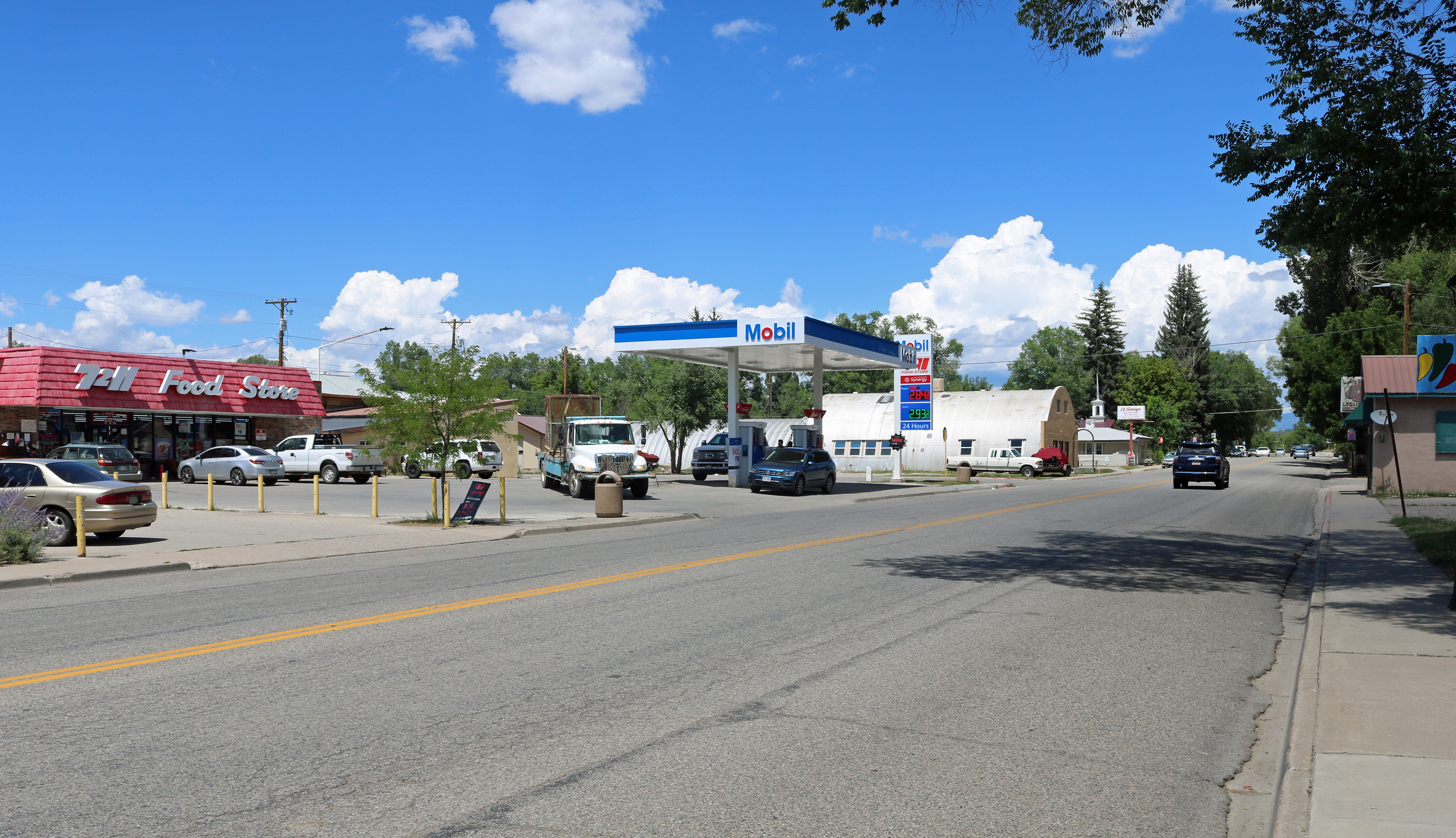
- Looking north along Goddard Avenue in Ignacio

- Location of Ignacio in La Plata County, Colorado.
- Coordinates: 37°07′05″N 107°38′15″W
- Country: United States
- State: Colorado
- County: La Plata County
- Tribe: Southern Ute Indian Tribe
- Incorporated (town): July 7, 1913

Government
  - Type: Statutory town

Area
  - Total: 0.43 sq mi (1.12 km^{2})
  - Land: 0.43 sq mi (1.12 km^{2})
  - Water: 0 sq mi (0.00 km^{2})
- Elevation: 6,454 ft (1,967 m)

Population (2020)
  - Total: 852
  - Density: 1,970/sq mi (761/km^{2})
- Time zone: UTC−07:00 (MST)
  - Summer (DST): UTC−06:00 (MDT)
- ZIP code: 81137
- Area code: 970
- GNIS town ID: 2412787
- FIPS code: 08-38535
- Website: townofignacio.colorado.gov

Ignacio (Ute dialect: Piinuu) is a Statutory town in La Plata County, Colorado, United States. The population was 852 at the 2020 United States census. Ignacio is the headquarters of the Southern Ute Indian Reservation.

== History ==
- On February 2, 1848, the Treaty of Guadalupe Hidalgo ceded northern Mexico (including all of the future State of Colorado) to the United States.
- On December 30, 1849, Chiefs of Ute signed the Peace Treaty of Abiquiú with the United States.
- The Territory of Colorado was organized on February 28, 1861.
- The Consolidated Ute Reservation was created on March 2, 1868.
- On September 13, 1873, the Brunot Treaty removed the San Juan Mountains from the Consolidated Ute Reservation.
- La Plata County was created on February 10, 1874.
- The Territory of Colorado became a state on August 1, 1876.
- On November 9, 1878, the Consolidated Ute Reservation was replaced by the much smaller Southern Ute Indian Reservation.
- The Ignacio, Colorado, post office opened on Jan 31, 1882
- The Town of Ignacio was incorporated on July 7, 1913.

== Geography ==
At the 2020 United States census, the town had a total area of 0.273 square miles (0.71 km^{2}), all of it land.

== Demographics ==
Historical population
| Census | Pop. | Note | %± |
|---|---|---|---|
| 1920 | 290 | | — |
| 1930 | 464 | | 60.0% |
| 1940 | 555 | | 19.6% |
| 1950 | 526 | | −5.2% |
| 1960 | 609 | | 15.8% |
| 1970 | 613 | | 0.7% |
| 1980 | 667 | | 8.8% |
| 1990 | 720 | | 7.9% |
| 2000 | 669 | | −7.1% |
| 2010 | 697 | | 4.2% |
| 2020 | 852 | | 22.2% |
U.S. Decennial Census

== See also ==
- Durango, CO Micropolitan Statistical Area
- Southern Ute Indian Reservation
- Ben Nighthorse Campbell
- Old Spanish National Historic Trail
- Southern Ute Cultural Center and Museum
