= Hunting Badger =

1999 novel by Tony Hillerman

- First edition cover
- Author: Tony Hillerman
- Cover artist: Peter Thorpe
- Language: English
- Series: Joe Leaphorn/Jim Chee Navajo Tribal Police Series
- Genre: Detective fiction
- Set in: Navajo Nation in Southwestern United States
- Published: 1999 HarperCollins
- Publication place: USA
- Media type: Print and audio
- Pages: 275
- ISBN: 0-06-019289-5
- OCLC: 42475625
- Preceded by: The First Eagle (1998)
- Followed by: The Wailing Wind (2002)

Hunting Badger is a crime novel by American writer Tony Hillerman, the fourteenth in the Joe Leaphorn/Jim Chee Navajo Tribal Police series, first published in 1999.

Armed robbers at a Ute Indian gambling casino shoot two security guards, one fatally. Sgt. Chee gets involved in the hunt for the robbers, while retired Lt. Leaphorn gets drawn in by one who will not go to the FBI or local police. Chee and Leaphorn work together again.

One reviewer considers this to be "Hillerman at his best." while another calls it a "Pleasing lesser work from the doyen of the regional mystery." The novel "continues to hold a high place on every national best-seller list." The basics of the plot were inspired by the "intensive manhunt that followed the murder of Officer Dale Claxton on May 4, 1998. . . only with more satisfying results." Most reviewers praised the descriptions of the dramatic landscape ("the scenery spectacular", "the most picturesque country in the Southwest", "the scenic Southwest's beauty") and one notes "several new insights into the mysteries of Navajo culture and a story with enough twists and surprises to make readers glad they checked in."

== Plot summary ==
Sophisticated robbers shoot the security guards at the Ute Casino, turn off the electricity and then steal the cash bagged and ready to be picked up for deposit to the bank. Cap Stoner is killed outright, while young Teddy Bai is severely wounded, but immediately suspected by the FBI as the "inside man" for the robbery. Chee returns from a long vacation in Alaska to be drawn into the investigation at the request of Officer Manuelito, who does not believe Bai is guilty. Roy Gershwin draws Leaphorn into the investigation by saying that he knows who did it, leaving a list of three names with Leaphorn. Why does he choose Leaphorn, and not the police or the FBI? The FBI announces that the perpetrators fled in an airplane stolen from Mr. Timms.

Chee and his friend Cowboy Dashee revisit the site where the escape vehicle was found with two sets of footprints, and visit the Timms place nearby. They track the aircraft to the second landholding of Timms, so the criminals are still on the loose. Leaphorn travels with Prof. Bourebonette, who is working near where the men on Gershwin's list live. Leaphorn finds Everett Jory in his house, shot dead, leaving a suicide note on his computer screen. The note names his two confederates in the crime, George Badger Ironhand and Alexander Buddy Baker, who misled Jory as to the use of the money. The pick-up truck parked at his place is the second seen at the Casino. The FBI gets active in the case again. The officer in charge, Mr. Cabot, directs a huge systematic search of the area near Jory's home (near the border of Arizona with Utah), with the local police forces doing the searching. Prof. Bourebonette interviews a Ute woman with Leaphorn in company. The woman relates the story of Ironhand from the early 20th century, a man who fooled the Navajos in pursuit of him. He had a son who was a skilled fighter in the Vietnam War, still alive. About the same time, Chee visits his uncle Frank Sam Nakai, finding him mistakenly in a hospital. Once he and Manuelito move Nakai back to his home, Nakai warns Chee of Ironhand and the coal mine, and gives Chee his final lesson on the Nightway ceremonial. Then Nakai dies of lung cancer.

Leaphorn learns from retired FBI agent Kennedy (the start of the retired cops group) that the broken radio found in the abandoned vehicle had wires cut inside, like a careful sabotage. He realizes that the robbers are hidden where they get no news, so will be appearing soon; one of them fishes for old newspapers at a gas station and drives off just as Chee drives in to fill up his gas tank. The station owner gives enough description to indicate it is Ironhand. The vehicle, stolen like the first one, is found abandoned near Gothic Creek Canyon. In the second day of searching, Chee sprains his ankle. After talking with Leaphorn, he calls on the head of the EPA project at the airport that is using a helicopter to scan for uranium, which is usually found in or near old coal mines. They agree to an extra bit of flying, and Chee finds the long mine shaft likely built by Mormons in the prior century, since abandoned, not visible from the search area, and once used by the original Ironhand. Cabot is scornful of this information, claiming they searched that place already, finding no signs of habitation.

Roy Gershwin meets with Leaphorn again, claiming to be afraid he will be killed as an informer. Chee calls to report the success in finding the mine shaft while Gershwin is present, and Gershwin sees Leaphorn mark it on a map. Chee falls on his injured ankle, so Manuelito takes him to the clinic and then home, where Leaphorn meets them with his new theory of the crime. Leaphorn learned that Jory had lawsuits against both Timms and Gershwin, and that Gershwin is in poor financial condition, worse if Jory's lawsuit prevails. Gershwin likely typed that suicide note after killing Jory. They visit Timms, learning that Gershwin is just ahead of them. They proceed to the top of the mine shaft, finding Gershwin's vehicle there. They position themselves out of sight, with Leaphorn directing their actions. They hear gunshots from the mine. Gershwin walks from the old structure and Leaphorn confronts him, holding a rifle. Gershwin admits to shooting at both Baker and Ironhand, saying it was self-defense. Baker lies dead. Leaphorn introduces Chee, while Manuelito radios for support. Gershwin goes for his own pistol, so Chee tells Gershwin to drop it, which he does. Ironhand shoots Gershwin from beneath the plywood over the mine shaft. Gershwin lies dead. When Cabot arrives, Leaphorn tells him to look in Gershwin's truck for the casino money, which he finds intact. Riding away from the crowded scene, Chee begins to realize that Leaphorn likes him, and that he is beginning to like Bernadette Manuelito.

== Characters ==
- Joe Leaphorn: Retired lieutenant of the Navajo Tribal Police, widower, who lives in Window Rock, Arizona.
- Jim Chee: Officer in the Navajo Tribal Police, recently returned from a trip to Alaska. He is again based in Shiprock, New Mexico as a sergeant, having had enough of being an Acting Lieutenant.
- Emma Leaphorn: Deceased wife of Joe, about whom we learn through his memories of her and his life with her, and comparisons between her and Leaphorn's friend Louisa.
- Louisa Bourebonette: Professor of cultural anthropology, friend of Leaphorn, who was introduced in Coyote Waits. She is now interviewing Utes for their old story, and uses Leaphorn's guest bedroom as a base for reaching her interviews.
- Teddy Bye: Deputy Sheriff in Montezuma County who works a second job as security for the Ute Casino. He is engaged to be married. He is shot multiple times by the thieves, yet considered by the FBI as the inside man of the sophisticated robbery as he recovers in the hospital.
- Cap Stoner: Retired police captain who works as security for the Ute Casino. He is killed by thieves who steal the casino's cash.
- Bernadette (Bernie) Manuelito: Young officer recently transferred back to Shiprock from Tuba City office of Navajo Tribal Police, so she can more easily care for her ill mother; she was introduced in The Fallen Man.
- Captain Largo: Superior officer for both Chee and Manuelito at the Shiprock office of the Navajo Tribal Police.
- Albert "Cowboy" Dashee: Hopi man, friend of Chee, and Deputy Sheriff in Apache County. He was introduced in The Dark Wind.
- Hosteen Frank Sam Nakai: Hatalii and uncle to Chee, who is dying from lung cancer. He gives Chee the last lesson in the Nightway ceremony, so that Chee can decide whether he is strong enough in himself to help others in the Navajo ceremonials. He appeared in Sacred Clowns and The First Eagle.
- Jay Kennedy: Retired FBI agent who Leaphorn calls when deciding how to handle the information shared with him by Roy Gershwin. Leaphorn worked with Kennedy many times before his own retirement. He was introduced in Skinwalkers.
- Roy Gershwin: Politically oriented man who selects Leaphorn as the one to learn the names of three culprits in the murder and thievery at the Ute Casino. He is threatened with a suit by Jory that would deprive him of his grazing lease near Montezuma Creek. He murders Jory, and is fatally shot by Ironhand in the final scene.
- Alice Deal: New Mexico state police dispatcher who directs Chee as to where Bye took flying lessons.
- Jim Edgar: He works at Farmington, New Mexico airport where Teddy Bye took flying lessons from Four Corners Flight, and where the DOE helicopter is based.
- Mr. Timms: Owner of an old airplane (50-year-old model L-17) who claims his plane was stolen by the thieves, leading the FBI to declare the robbers used it to flee. He made a false insurance claim for theft. He owns two grazing leases.
- George (Badger) Ironhand: Decorated Vietnam War veteran, sharpshooter, and a Green Beret, in a local militia group, son of a well-known Ute of the early 20th century (in Ute lore), who stole from the Navajos and baffled them by his method of escape in Gothic Creek canyon. He is part of the team persuaded by Gershwin to carry out this robbery.
- Alexander (Buddy) Baker: Third man in the original group to carry out the Ute Casino robbery, in a local militia group. He once worked in the casino, the "inside man" assumed essential for this heist. He is murdered by Gershwin while in hiding.
- Everett Jory: Man with strong political views, once had his own radio program. Jory is a lawyer and a man fond of legal suits, with one pending against Gershwin. Leaphorn finds him dead. Thought at first to be a suicide, he was murdered by Gershwin who also typed a suicide note on Jory's computer leading the police to know the names of the two in hiding.
- Damon Cabot: FBI agent-in-charge of the Ute Casino case, newly arrived from Philadelphia.
- P. J. (Pattie) Collins: EPA staffer who leads the project to identify exposed uranium, which is often tied with old coal mines; she allows Chee to ride along the day they scan Gothic Creek canyon. (based on a real person per Author's Note.)
- Tom McKissick: Pilot of helicopter owned by the US Department of Energy, which is equipped specially to detect and image the radiation, who conducts the survey of lands with uranium on the Navajo Reservation for the EPA. He, the co-pilot and the tech are based on real people per the Author's Note.
- Rosemary: Engaged to Teddy Bye.
- Janet Pete: Lawyer in federal Department of Justice. She is half Navajo and grew up in the cities of the East Coast. She returns to work in the Four Corners area after being home in Washington DC. She had been engaged to Chee, but that connection is over. She is assigned to defend Teddy Bye. She was introduced in Skinwalkers.

== Allusions to real persons and events ==
In the interviews that Professor Louisa Bourebonette holds with an old Ute woman, old enmities began to upset Joe Leaphorn. Besides the murdering thief of the current story, he reflects on the history in the 19th century, when Utes joined with the U.S. Army under Kit Carson to put the Navajos down and ultimately to drive them out of their homeland. From the time of the Spanish, the Utes and Paiutes had been enemies to the Navajos, though all living in the same large area of the Colorado Plateau.

In the Author's Note, Hillerman explains that the EPA team and the helicopter pilot and co-pilot were based on real people conducting the project to map exposed uranium on the Navajo Reservation, as a start to remediation from the uranium mining done for federal government projects.

== Geography ==
In his 2011 book Tony Hillerman's Navajoland: Hideouts, Haunts, and Havens in the Joe Leaphorn and Jim Chee Mysteries, author Laurance D. Linford has listed the following 48 geographical locations, real and fictional, mentioned in Hunting Badger.

- Aneth, Utah
- Aztec, New Mexico
- Beclabito, New Mexico
- Black Creek Valley, Arizona
- Blanding, Utah
- Bluff, Utah
- Bluff Bench, Utah
- Casa Del Eco Mesa, Utah
- Chinle, Arizona
- Chinle Wash, Arizona
- Chuska Mountains, New Mexico and Arizona
- Colorado River, Colorado, Utah and Arizona
- Comb Ridge, Arizona and Utah
- Cortez, Colorado
- Desert Creek, Utah
- Dinétah, New Mexico
- Durango, Colorado
- Farmington, New Mexico
- Flagstaff, Arizona
- Four Corners, New Mexico, Arizona, Utah and Colorado
- Gallup, New Mexico
- Glen Canyon, Arizona
- Gothic Creek, Utah
- Gothic Creek Canyon, Utah
- Jicarilla Apache Reservation, New Mexico
- Lake Powell, Utah and Arizona
- Lukachukai, Arizona
- Manuelito Plateau, New Mexico
- Mexican Water Trading Post, Arizona
- Montezuma Creek, Utah
- Mount Taylor, New Mexico
- Narbona Pass, New Mexico
- Nokaito Bench, Utah
- Recapture Creek, Utah
- Red Mesa, Arizona
- Red Mesa Chapter, Arizona
- Rough Rock, Arizona
- San Juan River, Colorado, New Mexico and Utah
- Shiprock (Community), New Mexico
- Sleeping Ute Mountain, Colorado
- Southern Ute Reservation, CO
- Toadlena, New Mexico
- Towoac, Colorado
- Tuba City, Arizona
- Two Grey Hills, New Mexico
- Ute Casino (fictitious establishment)
- White Mesa Ute Reservation, Utah
- Window Rock, Arizona

== Sources ==
- Linford, Laurance D. (2011). "Index of Places by Hillerman Title". Tony Hillerman's Navajoland: Hideouts, Haunts, and Havens in the Joe Leaphorn and Jim Chee Mysteries. University of Utah Press. ISBN 978-1-60781-988-2 – via Project MUSE.
