= The Sinister Pig =

Book by Tony Hillerman

- First edition cover
- Author: Tony Hillerman
- Cover artist: Peter Thorpe
- Language: English
- Series: Joe Leaphorn/Jim Chee Navajo Tribal Police Series
- Genre: Detective fiction
- Set in: Navajo Nation and Hopi Reservation in Southwestern United States
- Published: 2003 HarperCollins
- Publication place: USA
- Media type: Print and audio
- Pages: 228
- ISBN: 0-06-019443-X
- OCLC: 51766303
- Preceded by: The Wailing Wind (2002)
- Followed by: Skeleton Man (2004)

The Sinister Pig is a crime novel by American writer Tony Hillerman, the sixteenth in the Joe Leaphorn/Jim Chee Navajo Tribal Police series, first published in 2003. It was a New York Times best-seller.

A mystery involving diverted oil and gas revenues, abandoned pipelines, Washington D.C. insiders, and illegal drugs involves Navajo Tribal Police Sergeant Jim Chee and Bernadette Manuelito, now a federal Border Patrol officer. Each turns to retired Lt. Joe Leaphorn, now called legendary by his colleagues as well as by Chee, for assistance. Along the way, elegant and dramatic romances reach happy conclusions.

== Plot summary ==
Not long after Carl Manken leaves Washington D.C. to investigate an issue in the news, his murdered corpse is found on the edge of the Checkerboard part of the Navajo Reservation, near the Apache Jicarilla Reservation. Soon, his vehicle is found on the Jicarilla Reservation. Each use of Manken's credit card is monitored by the issuer, a high-level intervention that sends Sgt. Chee and FBI Agent Osborne to retrieve the card from the workmen using it after finding it in trash they picked up. In Washington D.C., the newsworthy issue is the large amount of royalties never paid to the tribes who own the land providing natural resources, including oil, natural gas and coal; the tribes are suing the Department of Interior.

Bernadette Manuelito is on routine surveillance in her new position as a US Customs Patrol Officer, when she finds the Tuttle ranch in the boot heel of New Mexico, where a truck with Mexican license plates enters. She investigates, taking photos of the exotic wildlife and the construction project underway, described as a pump for water for the oryxes and ibexes. She shares the prints of her photos with Sgt. Chee, who in turn shares them with Lt. Leaphorn. One of the trucks in her photos is from Seamless Weld of El Paso, Texas, the same company that the dead man reported as his employer on the rental car form. Her boss, Ed Henry, takes the negatives and other set of prints, while taking a photo of her and telling her to leave the ranch alone. On her first successful solo netting, taking in a group of illegal aliens, the brother-in-law in the group recognizes Manuelito from photos circulating among the drug dealers in Sonora, with word to kill her. Her roommate Mrs. Garza calls Leaphorn with this information, because Manuelito will not call Chee. Leaphorn finds that the pathway of the unused pipeline from the now disused Mexican copper mine passes right through the Tuttle ranch, shown on an old map when the smelter was active. He figures the work recently done at each place is to get the pipeline working again, either to divert natural gas or oil southbound, or to bring in drugs, northbound. The Tuttle ranch is a lease on BLM lands, giving Dashee authority to be there; he and Sgt. Chee head for the ranch directly.

Directed by her boss to the Tuttle ranch, Manuelito finds herself in an awkward position. The usually locked and guarded gate is swinging open, and no one is in sight. She drives to the building, climbing on her vehicle to look in through the only windows. Three men approach her; Winsor aims his hunting rifle at her. Her weapon is taken by Diego and the four proceed inside the building. Manuelito sees the drugs at the opening from the pipeline. Winsor plans to execute her. Budge tells her in Spanish to claim she is from DEA and willing to take a cut of the money Winsor will get from the amount of drugs she sees, which she does. Winsor talks about the mistaken killing of Manken, who was not involved in illegal drugs, but hunting out the situation on royalties owed for resources extraction, and mentions the fate of Chrissy. Budge takes her weapon from Diego while Manuelito kicks the rifle. Winslow hits her with the butt of the rifle; then Budge shoots Winslow. Budge tends to her wound. He and Diego leave. Manuelito sits in her vehicle, after calling her own dispatcher and the state police for assistance. Sgt. Chee and Cowboy Dashee arrive at the ranch to find her resting in her vehicle. This scene evokes the words from Chee that he loves Bernie, words he could not say these six months. Then he and Dashee listen to what happened, and see the private airplane above, heading for Mexico. Customs officers, the FBI, the DEA, the state and county police, and Dashee of the Bureau of Land Management discuss who has authority, until someone from Homeland Security arrives to trump them all. Manuelito takes pain medication from the medics, who take her to the hospital. In the Epilog: Away in Mexico, Budge finds Chrissy, whom he did not kill, as he loves her and asks her to marry him. Back in Shiprock, Manuelito looks over the trailer that serves Chee as home, suggesting they move it away and build a real house.

== Characters ==
- Joe Leaphorn: Retired Lieutenant from the Navajo Tribal Police, widowed. He lives in Window Rock, Arizona.
- Jim Chee: Sergeant in the Navajo Tribal Police. He lives in Shiprock, New Mexico near the San Juan River.
- Bernadette Manuelito: U.S. Customs Patrol officer (CPO at the border with Mexico) for the last six months. She resigned from the Navajo Tribal Police. She loves Chee. Introduced in The Fallen Man.
- Albert Cowboy Dashee: Bureau of Land Management security officer. He is Hopi and a long-time friend to Chee. Introduced in The Dark Wind
- Captain Largo: Chee's superior officer in the Shiprock office of the NTP.
- Louisa Bourebonette: Professor of cultural anthropology with an interest in origin stories. She is a good friend to Leaphorn, who uses Leaphorn's spare room as a base for her dispersed interviews. Introduced in Coyote Waits.
- Carl Mankin: Alias of a retired CIA Agent who is sent to investigate the alleged revenue misappropriations by an unnamed US senator, found murdered. He was Gordon Stein, per Mary Goddard. He was a man over 60, trained as a petroleum engineer who worked also with the CIA.
- Jerry "Oz" Osborne: FBI Special Agent in the Gallup, NM office, originally assigned to the case, now overtaken by the Washington, D.C. office. Introduced in The Wailing Wind.
- Tom O'Day: He guards the gate at the Tuttle ranch the first time Manuelito arrives there.
- Rawley Winsor: Wealthy and unscrupulous man who lives in Washington D.C., but has business interests and holdings in New Mexico, mainly as a primary supplier of illegal drugs. He is married, and a stout man in appearance. He is considered a Washington power broker.
- Robert Budge: Rawley Winsor's chauffeur and private pilot, who is wanted for arrest in Guatemala during times of political unrest there. Also known as Silvanios Roberto C de Baca, with deep roots in Spain, he is a tall, athletic man.
- Diego de Vargas: Once a colonel in the Mexican military, now the Mexican partner for Winsor's work. He drives the truck that Manuelito follows to the Tuttle ranch. He has more in common with Budge than with Winsor.
- Chrissy: Law school student who works for Winsor, and had an affair with him. She thinks he will marry her when she gets pregnant, but he has other plans for her.
- Ed Henry: Officer Manuelito's supervisor in the U.S. Border Patrol, with links to The Man on the East Coast. Henry does what’s good for Henry, subordinating ethics and law.
- Eleanda Garza: Border Patrol agent, housemate of Officer Manuelito, and member of the Tohono O'odham Nation (the Desert People).
- Dan Mundy: Retired US prosecutor who comes to speak with Leaphorn about the murder and the royalties case.
- Jason Ackerman: Attorney friend of Mundy, who works in Washington, D.C., and joins Mundy in the search for information on the powerful forces at play in the investigation of the murder on the Navajo Reservation.
- Mary Goddard: Reporter for a national news magazine, U.S. News & World Report, who interviews Leaphorn.

== Reviews ==
Marilyn Stasio points to an extraordinary display of sheer plotting craftsmanship:

Kirkus Reviews finds this novel to be light on plot, the mystery too easy to solve:

Publishers Weekly calls this a masterful tale with deeper intrigue and a tighter plot than the prior novel in the series:

School Library Journal finds a masterful plot, with appeal to general readers as well as those who follow this series of Hillerman novels:

== Title ==
The title relates to a jargon term in running pipelines. The pig is a piece inserted to clean the pipeline, in more recent days to track the location of leaks and to separate commodities sent through the pipe (e.g., gasoline followed by kerosene). The plot involves two sinister pigs, one in the pipeline and the one who modified the pipeline. Reference is made to a French farming term for the pig in a farmyard who will eat all it can, then block the other pigs from eating, le cochon sinistre, which is the title of this volume in France.

== Natural, cultural and historical references ==
Geographic, botanical, animal, historical, and cultural artifacts and events often play key roles in the Chee/Leaphorn series - either as direct plot elements, to explain character motivations or perspectives, or to illustrate cultural or religious beliefs and practices. Although less true here than for many other novels in the series, such references in The Sinister Pig include:

- Scimitar oryx (exotic game animal raised on the Tuttle Ranch)
- Bernadette Manuelito is assigned to patrol the basin and range topography of the rugged Animas Mountains of Hidalgo County in the extreme southwestern corner of New Mexico, also called the boot heel of New Mexico. Manuelito stays in Rodeo. Chee is based in Shiprock, New Mexico, while Leaphorn is in Window Rock, Arizona. The murdered man is found on the Checkerboard reservation, while his car is found in the Jicarilla Reservation. The lands of the eastern portion of the Navajo Nation, in New Mexico, are called the Checkerboard reservation. This arose from the way in which land was given to railroads in the 19th century, leaving questions of who owns land, a problem for police jurisdictions among others.
- Guatemalan Civil War (motivation for de Baca); Institutional Revolutionary Party (historic basis for de Vargas military association); Phelps Dodge mining and minerals company (historic basis for mines and smelters in southern New Mexico and Arizona); Cobell v. Kempthorne (class-action lawsuit involving claims that the U.S. government incorrectly accounted for Indian trust assets).

== Narrative style ==
Each chapter of the novel is from the viewpoint of a specific character, rather than the views of Chee or Leaphorn alone. For example, the reader knows what sort of man Winsor is before Chee, Leaphorn or Manuelito know. At the end, Dashee and Chee get lost en route, while Manuelito is facing her tormentor and her two unexpected allies in a small building on the Tuttle ranch.

== Television adaptation ==
The third season of Dark Winds is based on Dance Hall of the Dead which was published in 1973 and The Sinister Pig.

== See also ==
- The Minerals Management Service of the U.S. Department of the Interior
- Pipeline pigging
