= The Wailing Wind =

Book by Tony Hillerman

- First edition cover
- Author: Tony Hillerman
- Cover artist: Peter Thorpe
- Language: English
- Series: Joe Leaphorn/Jim Chee Navajo Tribal Police Series
- Genre: Detective fiction
- Set in: Navajo Nation and Hopi Reservation in Southwestern United States
- Publisher: HarperCollins
- Publication date: 2002
- Publication place: USA
- Media type: Print and audio
- Pages: 232 + maps
- ISBN: 0-06-019444-8
- OCLC: 48383430
- Preceded by: Hunting Badger (1999)
- Followed by: The Sinister Pig (2003)

The Wailing Wind is a crime novel by American writer Tony Hillerman, the fifteenth in the Joe Leaphorn/Jim Chee Navajo Tribal Police series, first published in 2002. It is a New York Times best-seller.

The case of a murdered man, found in a truck on a canyon wash, immediately links to a past shooting and a lost woman tied to myths of lost gold mines, so the retired Joe Leaphorn involves himself along with Bernadette Manuelito of the Navajo Tribal Police.

== Plot summary ==
Navajo Tribal Police Officer Bernadette Manuelito investigates an abandoned vehicle in Apache County, Arizona. She finds the body of Thomas Doherty in the truck. She identifies seeds on his clothing and shoes when checking that he is dead, seeds not from plants nearby. Awaiting an ambulance, Manuelito collects seeds for her garden, placing them in an old tobacco tin she finds nearby. When the body is moved, it becomes clear he was murdered, and the FBI steps in. Manuelito gives the tobacco tin to her boss, now that the area is a crime scene.

Sergeant Jim Chee contacts retired police Lieutenant Joe Leaphorn for advice on how to resolve the problem of the old tin, now evidence removed from a crime scene. This renews Leaphorn's interest in a case involving Wiley Denton, a Gallup oil and gas magnate who shot and killed Marvin McKay. McKay was bringing evidence to Denton of the location of the old Golden Calf gold mine, to earn money from Denton. Denton served time for the killing, claiming self-defense. Denton contacts Leaphorn to find Denton's wife, who disappeared the day of the shooting. After questioning Denton, Leaphorn agrees to search for his wife. First, Leaphorn visits the scene where Doherty's body was found, discreetly replaces the tin with its sand / gold contents, and then points it out to Cowboy Dashee, the officer at the site.

Manuelito finds the place of Doherty's murder, based on the seeds and the ashes from the 1999 fire, and sees old Placer gold mining artifacts. A bullet whizzes past her head, but she sees no shooter. Later, the empty hogan nearby is found to belong to Hostiin James Peshlakai, who is arrested by the FBI, as the shells match his gun. Leaphorn interviews Peggy McKay, drawing a new profile of McKay and his encounter with Denton. Peggy was not believed by the investigators at that time. McKay's personal effects, still in police storage, do not match the story of the killing as told by Denton. Specifically, McKay's jacket has no pocket large enough for the gun Denton said McKay carried and no blood stains, and the map in his briefcase shows a different place than Denton reported to Leaphorn. Peggy says now and said then that he never carried a gun. Retracing McKay's steps the day of his death, Leaphorn finds that a woman waited in his car as McKay sought materials from the archive at Fort Wingate. He said the woman was his wife, but his wife was not with him; McKay called her to give updates of the time he would arrive home. Leaphorn searches McKay's car to find blonde hairs, the lens of eyeglasses and a receipt for tools. It begins to look like premeditated murder by Denton. Two events occurred the day McKay was murdered, on a past Halloween; the second was a report of a woman wailing, heard by four high school students who were crossing Fort Wingate army munitions depot, a vast place with a long history, used for archives in the bunkers. Leaphorn interviews two of the students who reported the wailing sound and the faint sound of music. Teresa Hano at the archives tells him that Doherty had been there looking at records related to gold mines, as had McKay years earlier.

Professor Bourebonette researches the ownership of the land where Doherty was killed, learning that it comes up for sale at the start of September. Denton has an option to buy it. Leaphorn ends his connection with Denton, because Denton lied to him. Denton persuades him to meet again, trying to take over the encounter in Leaphorn's car with a gun. Leaphorn, who knows the true sequence of events five years earlier, remains in charge by driving to the bunker where they find the mummified body of Denton's wife Linda, and her love note as she waited for him to rescue her. Denton killed McKay so quickly that he gave McKay no chance to mention where Linda was being held hostage, as Denton did not believe that threat. The music she played that night, heard by the passing students intermingled with the sound of the wind, was dismissed as a Halloween prank when police could not find the source. Chee and Manuelito arrive at the bunker, preventing any use of his gun by Denton. Chee arrests Denton for the murder of Doherty. Denton had killed the two who might have spread knowledge of land with the Golden Calf coming up for sale. He lost his wife by his obsession. He involved the unaware Peshlakai in murder charges. Chee and Manuelito each spent time during this case considering the other. Leaphorn encourages Manuelito to tell Chee that she likes him. The horrors of the ending drive her to consider leaving the police, to find a position where she can help people directly.

== Characters ==
- Lt Joe Leaphorn: Widowed, retired from Navajo Tribal Police, still holds title as a county sheriff, and lives in Window Rock, Arizona.
- Sgt. Jim Chee: Single, works in the Navajo Tribal Police, based in Shiprock, New Mexico.
- Albert "Cowboy" Dashee: Deputy Sheriff of Apache County, Arizona and friend to Chee and colleague to Leaphorn. He was introduced in The Dark Wind.
- Bernadette Manuelito: Young patrol officer for the Navajo Tribal Police, reports to Sgt. Chee. She was introduced in The Fallen Man.
- Thomas Doherty: Young man who worked for the US Forest Service, helped with fire suppression, nephew of a former County Sheriff. He is found dead in his vehicle by Officer Manuelito.
- Captain Largo: Superior officer at Shiprock, to both Chee and Manuelito.
- Professor Louisa Bourebonette: Professor of anthropology, specialist in origin stories, Leaphorn's friend, who sometimes uses the spare bedroom as her base for interviews for her research. She was introduced in Coyote Waits.
- Tomas and Gracello Garcia: Two of the four high school students who heard the frightening noises on Halloween five years earlier while taking a shortcut across Fort Wingate and since then, married with children. Leaphorn finds them to ask them again about what happened that night.
- Lorenzo Perez: McKinley County police officer who was part of the initial investigation of McKay's murder, and followed the wife's disappearance, suspecting a crime. Now retired, he calls to tell the guard to allow Leaphorn to enter Fort Wingate to find D2187.
- Ozzie Price: Deputy sheriff in McKinley County who shows Leaphorn the evidence from the five-year-old murder of McKay.
- Jerry Osborne: Special Agent in the Gallup, New Mexico office of the FBI, new since the events in The First Eagle.
- Ralph Harjo: Bureau of Indian affairs agent with Navajo mother who left the reservation in childhood. He serves as the FBI's translator in interviews with Peshlakai.
- Hostiin James Peshlakai: Respected hataalii who lives in his hogan in a canyon near an area sacred to the Navajo for plants and minerals needed for ceremonials. He is suspected of shooting at Officer Manuelito and arrested by the FBI. Chee and Manuelito understand him speaking Navajo, while Harjo misses all the terms related to religious ceremonies. (Name of a real man borrowed for this character, per Author's Note.)
- Hostiin Rodney Yellow: Officer Manuelito's maternal uncle, a shaman and ethnobotanist, who gave her the name Girl Who Laughs.
- Ashton Hoski: Hataalii who agrees to perform the Big Star Way curing ceremonial for Peshalakai, in the season when thunder sleeps, that is, October; Peshlakai requested it the day that Doherty's body was found.
- Teresa Hano: Librarian at the archives in the Army site who recalls the research done by both McKay and Doherty.
- Wiley Denton: Oil and gas magnate, Vietnam war veteran, over 50 years old, long obsessed by old gold mines. He lives in a mansion near Gallup, New Mexico. He served time in jail for killing Marvin McKay.
- Linda Verbiscar Denton: Young blonde wife of Wiley Denton; she worked at a cafe when she met him before she was 21 years old. She has been missing since the day Wiley met McKay.
- Marvin McKay: Killed a few years earlier by Wiley Denton at Denton's home, who claimed self-defense; a patron at the cafe where Linda worked before her marriage, with a record as a con man.
- Peggy McKay: Nurse and common law wife of Marvin McKay, a dark-haired woman.

== Allusions ==
Geographic, botanical, animal, historical, and cultural artifacts and events often play key roles in the plot of this novel. Stories of Navajo culture reveal or explain character motivations or perspectives.

=== Allusions to literature and culture ===
"Hostiin" is a respectful form of address to an elder in the Navajo Nation.

Pozole is a regional food, served to Leaphorn during investigation.

In Chapter 13, Leaphorn alludes to the play Othello by Shakespeare, likening Linda's attraction to her husband to that between Desdemona and Othello. Wiley Denton mentions Othello again in Chapter 29, having read the play and seeing the similarity to himself.

In Chapter 15, while discussing his review of the crime scene items boxed up from McKay's murder, Leaphorn refers to a Raymond Chandler mystery, where a key bit of information was found under the toupee of a murdered man, in a room otherwise sacked in search of what Marlowe found. That is part of the novel The Little Sister published in 1949.

The Big Star Way ceremonial requested by Hostiin Peshlakai is one of the many curing ceremonials of the Navajo people.

=== Real places mentioned in the novel ===
Doherty's body is found west of the Chuska Mountains just over the line into Apache County, Arizona. Shiprock, New Mexico is the location of Chee's office. Gallup, New Mexico is where the FBI office is located, and Denton's mansion is located just outside the city, in McKinley County. Joe Leaphorn lives in Window Rock, Arizona. Fort Wingate is near Gallup. The fictional alluvial gold mine is located on the Checkerboard part of the Navajo Nation, in New Mexico. This name and ownership situation arose from the way in which land was given to railroads in the 19th century, leaving questions of who owns any specific parcel of land.

=== Botanical species identified in the plot ===
Chamisa, sandbur, goathead are the plant seeds Manuelito identifies on Doherty's clothing after touching him to determine he was dead, seeds that do not naturally occur at that site. Aster, mountain columbine are the seeds she collects to plant in her garden. Thread and needle grass, snake weed, Johnson grass are plant life encountered by Manuelito while searching for the site where Doherty was killed.

=== Allusions to historical events ===
Leaphorn reads letters in the archives, written in the 19th century about why the Navajo disliked white men seeking gold in their territory. These Navajo archives are kept at Fort Wingate, once a location of old ordnance bunkers, and presently the location of historic archives of U.S. Army Surgeon Washington Matthews. The fort was closed as a base in 1993, but its land and archives are slowly being turned over to other uses, as environmental clean up proceeds. Matthews wrote of famous lost gold mines that were myths of the west in his time, including Lost Adams Diggings and Lost Dutchman's Gold Mine, and is considered the first person to begin accurate documentation of Navajo life and customs. Matthew's books are now saved as part of Project Gutenberg; three are referenced at Many Books. The letter copied in the text is not cited in those books.

Placer mining is a technique for extracting gold (or other precious metals) from alluvial deposits in a stream bed, as Officer Manuelito, and earlier Thomas Doherty, saw in the area exposed by fire.

== Reviews ==
Marilyn Stasio said that Hillerman is never better than when he is circling a puzzle from various angles, playing with the perceptions of his detectives as well as the reader's. As for the truth . . . well, it's out there, somewhere on the wind.

Kirkus Reviews remarks the top-notch detective work and a solution worthy of the puzzle:

Publishers Weekly says Hillerman repeatedly shines in the masterfully complex new novel:

== See also ==
- Bureau of Land Management
- Diné Bahaneʼ
- Placer mining
- Methods of Placer mining

== Sources ==
- Linford, Laurance D. (2011). "Index of Places by Hillerman Title". Tony Hillerman's Navajoland: Hideouts, Haunts, and Havens in the Joe Leaphorn and Jim Chee Mysteries. University of Utah Press. ISBN 978-1-60781-988-2 – via Project MUSE.
