= The Blessing Way =

1970 novel by Tony Hillerman

- First edition cover
- Author: Tony Hillerman
- Cover artist: Mozelle Thompson
- Language: English
- Series: Jim Chee/Joe Leaphorn Navajo Tribal Police Series
- Genre: Crime fiction
- Set in: Navajo Nation
- Publisher: Harper & Row
- Publication date: 1970
- Publication place: United States of America
- Media type: Print (hardcover and paperback) & Audio book
- Pages: 306
- ISBN: 0061808350
- Followed by: Dance Hall of the Dead (1973)

The Blessing Way is a crime novel by American writer Tony Hillerman, the first in the Joe Leaphorn/Jim Chee Navajo Tribal Police series. First published in 1970, it introduces the character of officer Joe Leaphorn.

Two anthropology professors from New Mexico plan a summer research trip on the Navajo Reservation. Bergen McKee meets his college friend Joe Leaphorn, now a police officer, there. McKee's interest is the Navajo witches and the role they play in the culture. He learns of one on his first day of interviews, who unexpectedly visits his campsite in the night, beginning a saga of peril for him. Leaphorn has a murdered young man as his case, which intertwines with McKee's encounters with a true Navajo witch.

== Plot summary ==
Anthropologist and professor Bergen McKee comes to the Navajo Reservation to research tales of witches and visit his college friend, Joe Leaphorn, who is a Navajo Tribal Police lieutenant. A young man, Luis Horseman, thinking he had killed a man in a fight, drops out of sight. His victim survives, so Leaphorn spreads the word at a trading post to entice Luis to come in. The next morning the body of Luis is found, having been suffocated with sand after being killed elsewhere. McKee and his colleague, J. R. Canfield, begin a joint field trip. They expect to meet Ellen Leon in Many Ruins Canyon as she seeks her fiancé, Dr. Hall. In the meantime, McKee also begins interviewing reservation residents, hoping to learn details about the Navajo witch. From Horseman's aunt Old Woman Gray Rocks he learns the Navajo Wolf is believed to be an outsider from another place.

The Tsosie family hosts a Navajo Enemy Way ceremony to deal with depredation of their livestock, which Joe Leaphorn attends. He meets Billy Nez, brother to Luis Horseman. Billy found the hat used as a symbolic scalp of the troublesome witch. The reason the witch is thought to be a stranger, Leaphorn learns, is that the Tsosie boys had found his camp, parked too far from water, whereas a local man would have known where the water was. Leaphorn finds the tracks of Billy and the man where Billy had taken the hat and realizes Billy will come to kill the man himself. He sets out to stop that.

When McKee returns to camp that evening, neither Canfield nor his vehicle is at the campsite. Instead, there is a note saying he will return; oddly, he signed the note John although his name is Jeremy. McKee sleeps outside but is awakened by unexpected sounds. He moves away from the campsite to listen. A man wearing a wolf skin and holding an automatic weapon walks into the campsite, then into the tent to read papers there. He calls out McKee's name but McKee keeps silent and the man walks away, having left McKee's vehicle inoperable. During the night, McKee slips on the rocks, injuring his right hand painfully. In the morning he looks for Miss Leon so they can both drive out quickly. They drive away, escaping the trap being set by the Navajo. McKee finds Canfield's vehicle and sees his dead body inside it, but does not tell Miss Leon. Not fully grasping their danger, Miss Leon wants to get help for him. As they argue, the Navajo returns with his weapon. He wants McKee to write a letter like the one Canfield left him. However, he sees that McKee cannot write until his hand heals. He takes the pair to an Anasazi pueblo, where his right hand is treated. The Navajo's partner Eddie is there, also armed. Left alone in the pueblo, Miss Leon apologizes to McKee for misunderstanding their situation.

Waking in the night, McKee finds a Hopi Kachina in the petroglyph on the wall. He begins digging for the escape exit that Hopis always had to keep from being boxed in by their enemies. He finds it, and sets a plan in motion for the return of Eddie and George. Miss Leon exits one way, while McKee uses old handholds and footholds to reach the level where Eddie is. Eddie shoots Ellen Leon and then seeks McKee. In doing so, he falls over the cliff edge into the crevasse to his death. McKee tends Ellen and seeks Hall for help, following an electric cable to a side canyon. George the Navajo shoots him in the back from a distance. McKee cuts off the insulation and uses it to make a catapult with a sapling, throwing a sharpened pine stake right into George, whose gun sight obscured his view. McKee picks up the Navajo's skin and gun and walks for help. Billy Nez appears with his rifle and tells McKee to stop. McKee tells him that he is a teacher. They reach Hall at his truck and tell him about Ellen. Hall tells Billy Nez to give up his rifle, but McKee cautions him not to. Leaphorn arrives at the scene, telling Billy Nez to hold onto his rifle. Leaphorn has already found Ellen Leon, seeing the smoky signal fire she set.

McKee wakes in the hospital two days later, confessing his two killings to Leaphorn. Ellen Leon recovers from her wounds. Leaphorn tells McKee that Hall killed himself right in front of him after McKee fainted from loss of blood. Hall was collecting radar data about missiles under test from a federal facility, hoping to sell his information for a huge fee. George, the Navajo from Los Angeles, and Eddie worked for him, keeping people away from his work. From the federal perspective, George and Eddie did not exist; Dr. Canfield and Hall were killed in a car accident, which injured Ellen Leon and McKee. Still recovering, McKee gets a long note from Ellen Leon.

== Theme ==
The novel introduces Joe Leaphorn as a secondary character. Anthropologist Bergen McKee draws Leaphorn into the story as an old friend and colleague whom he consults on Navajo witchcraft culture.

This story has a strong theme of the Navajo philosophy of keeping peace in life, setting priorities and living by them, against the greed for money represented by Hall and his two hired helpers. Hall is driven to make a million dollars and turns to illegal means to do it, hiring one notable criminal (George) and his lesser known ally, both eager for their share if the scheme had worked.

== Development of the novel ==
In his autobiography, Hillerman explained that McKee was the main character, and initially Leaphorn had a minor role. However, at the advice of his editors, he expanded Leaphorn's role.

Marilyn Stasio described the history behind The Blessing Way in The New York Times:

In the late 1960s, [Hillerman] said, he began to “practice” writing by working on a mystery, drawing on an earlier encounter he had had with a group of Navajos on horseback and in face paint and feathers in Crownpoint, N.M. They had been holding a Navajo Enemy Way ceremony for a soldier, a curing ritual that exorcises all traces of the enemy from those returning from battle. Mr. Hillerman had himself just returned from the war after a long convalescence ... He was so moved by the ceremony and so stirred by the rugged landscape that he resolved to live there. The experience became the basis for The Blessing Way (1970) ... He spent three years writing the novel and sent the manuscript to Joan Kahn, a respected mystery editor at Harper & Row, now HarperCollins. She published it after he complied with her suggestion—that he expand the role of a secondary character, the Navajo policeman Joe Leaphorn.

== Reception ==
Kirkus Reviews wrote that "authentic anthropological details; the self-effacing courage of McKee; and a particularly exciting entrapment in the canyons of this no white man's land make this an unqualified success."

== See also ==
- Navajo song ceremonial complex

== Sources ==
- Linford, Laurance D. (2011). "Index of Places by Hillerman Title". Tony Hillerman's Navajoland: Hideouts, Haunts, and Havens in the Joe Leaphorn and Jim Chee Mysteries. University of Utah Press. ISBN 978-1-60781-988-2 – via Project MUSE.
- Reilly, John M. (1996). Tony Hillerman: A Critical Companion. Westport, CT: Greenwood Press. ISBN 0-313-29416-X. OCLC 937296652.
