= Dance Hall of the Dead =

1973 novel by Tony Hillerman

- First edition
- Author: Tony Hillerman
- Cover artist: Gail Burwen
- Language: English
- Series: Jim Chee/Joe Leaphorn Navajo Tribal Police Series
- Genre: Detective fiction
- Set in: Zuni, New Mexico, Ramah Navajo Indian Reservation
- Publisher: Harper and Row
- Publication date: 1973
- Publication place: USA
- Media type: Print and audio
- Pages: 166
- Awards: 1973 Edgar Award for Best Novel
- ISBN: 0-06-011898-9
- OCLC: 650569
- Preceded by: The Blessing Way (1970)
- Followed by: Listening Woman (1978)

Dance Hall Of The Dead is a crime novel by American writer Tony Hillerman, the second in the Joe Leaphorn/Jim Chee Navajo Tribal Police series, first published in 1973. It features police Lieutenant Joe Leaphorn. It is set primarily in Ramah Reservation (part of the Navajo Reservation) and the Zuni village in New Mexico, both in the American Southwest.

Two boys are missing from the Zuni school. One boy is a Navajo, so Lieutenant Joe Leaphorn is called in to find him while the Zuni police seek the other boy. The Zuni boy's body is found, brutally murdered. Tracks of the other boy are found at the scene. This Navajo boy is a well-trained hunter who has to skip school some days to hunt to feed himself, his father and his brother. He seeks spiritual guidance, as well, being the only Navajo boy in his class at school. He is a challenge for Leaphorn, the most skilled tracker, to find, especially once he realizes who the killer is, and the search moves to a major Zuni ceremony.

The story contrasts Zuni and Navajo beliefs through the two boys and the two policemen. The Zuni believe in something like heaven after death, where the Navajo encourage the people to do their best on earth, as their chindi, the worst of a person, will be a ghost left behind after death. The two tribes reside in the same area for hundreds of years, yet use the land differently, Zunis preferring a town while Navajos spread out over the land, and have sharply contrasted beliefs as to the after life. This is played out in the bellagana culture, with ambitious anthropologists, the drug trade, the FBI, and narcotics officers.

== Plot summary ==
Ernesto Cata is in training to play his role as Shulawitsi the Fire God in an upcoming Zuni religious ceremony. He sees a kachina that can only be seen by the initiated, which he is not, or by those about to die. The next day, his friend George Bowlegs leaves school early, after learning Ernesto is not there. Lt. Joe Leaphorn works with the Zuni police chief Pasquaanti, who seeks Ernesto, while Leaphorn will seek George, a Navajo boy. A patch of blood-soaked soil is found at the meeting place where George was returning Ernesto's bicycle. That is the starting point in the search for the two boys.

Near the home of the Bowlegs, Leaphorn is approached by George's younger brother Cecil, who tells him that George is running away from the kachina, the one that got Ernesto. Cecil says that Ernesto had stolen some flints from the dig site. Next, Leaphorn talks with Ted Isaacs, who is about a mile from where the blood was found, at an anthropological dig site under the aegis of Professor Reynolds. Reynolds is ambitious to prove that Folsom Man culture continued longer than the accepted notions of its duration. Isaacs tells Leaphorn of the success in the field work. Reynolds bars Isaacs from having his girlfriend Susanne with him, and barred Ernesto and George from the site a few days earlier. When questioned, Reynolds denies any thefts from the site. Checking out Jason's Fleece, Leaphorn sees a Zuni kachina, rather unexpected next to the abandoned Navajo death hogan now housing the commune. He meets Susanne, who confirms that George was afraid of something and asking questions about absolution in the Zuni religion. Leaphorn learns that Ernesto's body has been found.

Pasquaanti and Ernesto's family dig up the boy's body, while Leaphorn examines the area to learn how the bike and the boy were brought there. After the funeral, Leaphorn visits the hogan of the Bowlegs, where he sees someone slipping away and then discovers the body of George and Cecil's father Shorty. Cecil returns by horse after getting the sheep in. Leaphorn gathers what Cecil needs, as their family home must now be abandoned as a death hogan. One item cannot be found, a note from George to Cecil. Leaphorn leaves Cecil at the Franciscan mission. Speaking again with Susanne, Leaphorn picks up the phrase ‘dance hall’ as where George means to go, which Father Ingles explains in terms of Zuni practices. Father Ingles tells Leaphorn how George was searching for a religion, a place to belong. Leaphorn shares with the priest how Ernesto died, by beheading.

Leaphorn finds Susanne hitchhiking. She joins him in the search for George, at a lake in Arizona. They find his horse's tracks, and then a deer killed for a meal, but not George. At every site there are moccasin prints, but Leaphorn has not found the man who wears moccasins. Then he recalls the stolen note, and knows for certain that the killer of Ernesto is at this same place. Leaphorn gets caught in a trap designed to tranquilize a deer but meant for George. Before he is taken over by the drugs he tells Susanne how to use his pistol, and while he is incapacitated by the drugs, she uses it. It is dawn before the drugs have left Leaphorn's system and he can walk about. They leave the site without finding George. Leaphorn meets with two of the six law enforcement agencies now involved in this case, three local and three federal; the FBI has the lead and is certain that the murders are tied to illegal drug movements.

Leaphorn knows who the killer is now and shares his information with Pasquaanti. He seeks George in the Shalako ceremonial at the Zuni village in the falling snow. Leaphorn sees George in the crowds but is one step behind the man who kills George. The killer is pulled into a doorway, having interfered with sacred Zuni ceremonies, and is never seen again. The next day, Leaphorn explains to Ted Isaacs that Reynolds had been “salting” the dig sites, so the field results would support his theory, and Reynolds is dead. Ernesto had taken some items from Reynolds' box and shared them with George; this meant the secret will come out. Reynolds' choice was to kill all in his way, the boys and Shorty Bowlegs. The FBI seeks sellers of illegal drugs and does not care about the dead boys or the old flints; the professor will soon be a missing-persons case, having been dealt his justice by Zuni law. It is left to Isaacs to decide how important his career is to him now, compared to his girl, last seen at the Zuni police station being questioned by the FBI. Leaphorn did find George, but not in time to save his life. Young Cecil will settle with relatives of his father.

== Characters ==
- Joe Leaphorn: Navajo Tribal Police Lieutenant; man with strong skills in tracking people.
- Ed Pasquaanti: chief of the Zuni tribal police.
- Ernesto Cata: young Zuni boy, 12 years old, follows both Catholic and Zuni practices
- Cecil Bowlegs: George Bowlegs' younger brother, 11 years old.
- George Bowlegs: young Navajo boy at the mainly Zuni school, 14 years old, friend of Cata and older brother of Cecil, considered strange as he wants to be a Zuni when he is a Navajo, but also a mystic, one who sought God. He skips school some days to hunt for food for his family.
- Shorty Bowlegs: father of George and Cecil, serious alcoholic who does not provide well for his sons.
- Susanne: a caring young woman, friend of George Bowlegs, living in a Hippie commune at the start of the novel, left school in the 10th grade, about 17 or 18 years old in the story.
- Ted Isaacs: graduate student of anthropology, excavating Professor Reynold's Folsom sites.
- Chester Reynolds: Professor of Anthropology and graduate advisor to Isaacs, an academic with a strong reputation and too much ambition.
- Father Ingles: Franciscan priest at the Saint Anthony's Mission School which all three boys attended.
- Halsey: leader of Jason's Fleece, the Hippie commune where Susanne lives when the story opens.
- John O'Malley: FBI agent, whom Leaphorn considers to be typical of all FBI agents.
- Baker: federal drug enforcement agent, or "narc".

== Themes ==
Themes of the book include the Zuni religion, the long history between the Navajo and the Zuni, contrasts between Zuni and Navajo culture and origin stories, and the contrast between white man's ways and the Navajo way.

== Title ==
The title is a loose translation of a Zuni concept, Kothluwalawa. Dancing is what one does when there is no work to do, or a concept of heaven, a celestial space, or of life after death. Young George was seeking that as a place, not a concept, where he might learn more. His Navajo upbringing offered no notion of heaven, so his language offered no word for this Zuni concept.

== Awards ==
Dance Hall Of The Dead received the 1973 Edgar Award for Best Novel.

== Allusions to Real Events and Cultures ==
The author includes a note about how to view what Joe Leaphorn learns about the Zuni religion and Shalako ceremonies, in the course of the novel.

In this book, the setting is genuine. The Village of Zuñí and the landscape of the Zuñí reservation and the adjoining Ramah Navajo reservation are accurately depicted to the best of my ability. The characters are purely fictional. The view the reader receives of the Shalako religion is as it might be seen by a Navajo with an interest in ethnology. It does not pretend to be more than that.

In the course of the story, much of the Navajo origin myths and specific cultural practices (e.g., death hogans abandoned if the dead person lay there a while before being buried) are described, and often aspects are contrasted to what Leaphorn or Father Ingles understands of Zuni practices (e.g., the role of the kachinas (meaning kachina dancers not dolls) and kachina masks in Zuni culture, the presence or absence of a notion of life after death).

The story reflects the newly emerging drug culture of the US and the phenomenon of hippie communes for younger people wanting to test new ways of living. It contrasts Susanne, a young white woman tossed out of home by her father with George and Cecil, Navajo boys whose mother was not present and whose father was alcoholic, leaving George to support the family while going to school.

== Geography ==
In his 2011 book Tony Hillerman's Navajoland: Hideouts, Haunts, and Havens in the Joe Leaphorn and Jim Chee Mysteries, author Laurance D. Linford has listed the following 11 geographical locations, real and fictional, mentioned in Dance Hall of the Dead.

Corn Mountain, New Mexico Coyote Canyon Coyote Wash, New Mexico Gallup, New Mexico Nutria Lake, New Mexico Ojo Caliente, New Mexico Ramah, New Mexico Shiprock (Community), New Mexico Zuni Pueblo, New Mexico Zuni Mesa (fictitious location) Zuni Wash or Zuni River, New Mexico and Arizona

== Television adaptation ==
The third season of Dark Winds is based on The Sinister Pig which was published in 2003 and Dance Hall of the Dead.

== See also ==
- McKinley County, New Mexico
- Painted Desert, Arizona
- Ramah Navajo Indian Reservation
- Zuni Indian Reservation

== Sources ==
- Linford, Laurance D. (2011). "Index of Places by Hillerman Title". Tony Hillerman's Navajoland: Hideouts, Haunts, and Havens in the Joe Leaphorn and Jim Chee Mysteries. University of Utah Press. ISBN 978-1-60781-988-2 – via Project MUSE.
