= Bouchercon XXVI =

1995 mystery and detective fiction convention

- Date: September 28, 1995
- Location: Nottingham
- Country: England
- Hosted by: Adrian Wootton

Bouchercon is an annual convention of creators and devotees of mystery and detective fiction. It is named in honour of writer, reviewer, and editor Anthony Boucher; also the inspiration for the Anthony Awards, which have been issued at the convention since 1986. This page details Bouchercon XXVI and the 10th Anthony Awards ceremony.

== Bouchercon ==
The convention was held at the Broadway Media Centre in Nottingham, England on September 28, 1995; running until the October 1. The event was chaired by Adrian Wooton, organiser of the Shots in the Dark mystery convention.

=== Special Guests ===
- Lifetime Achievement award — Ruth Rendell
- International Guest of Honor — James Ellroy
- British Guest of Honor — Colin Dexter
- Fan Guest of Honor — Geoff Bradley
- Toastmaster — Reginald Hill

== Anthony Awards ==
The following list details the awards distributed at the tenth annual Anthony Awards ceremony.

=== Novel award ===
Winner:

- Sharyn McCrumb, She Walks These Hills

Shortlist:

- Michael Connelly, The Concrete Blonde
- Lionel Davidson, Kolymsky Heights
- Janet Evanovich, One for the Money
- Sue Grafton, "K" Is for Killer
- Batya Gur, Murder on a Kibbutz
- Reginald Hill, Pictures of Perfection
- Lynda La Plante, Cold Shoulde]
- John Lescroart, The 13th Juror
- Val McDermid, Crack Down
- Walter Mosley, Black Betty
- Derek Raymond, Not Till the Red Fog Rises
- Janwillem van de Wetering, Just a Corpse at Twilight

=== First novel award ===
Winner:

- Caleb Carr, The Alienist

Shortlist:

- David Guterson, Snow Falling on Cedars
- Alex Keegan, Cuckoo
- Dennis Lehane, A Drink Before the War
- Carol O'Connell, Mallory's Oracle
- Laura Joh Rowland, Shinjū
- Michelle Spring, Every Breath You Take
- Doug J. Swanson, Big Town
- Chris West, Death of a Blue Lantern

=== Short story award ===
Winner:

- Sharyn McCrumb, "The Monster of Glamis", from Royal Crimes

Shortlist:

- Robert Barnard, "The Gentleman in the Lake", from Ellery Queen's Mystery Magazine June 1994
- Ed Gorman, "One of Those Days, One of Those Nights", from Crime Yellow
- Ian Rankin, "A Deep Hole", from London Noir

=== Critical / Non-fiction award ===
Winner:

- John Cooper & B.A. Pike, Detective Fiction: The Collector's Guide

Shortlist:

- William L. DeAndrea, Encyclopedia Mysteriosa
- Martin H. Greenberg, The Tony Hillerman Companion
- Rosemary Herbert, The Fatal Art of Entertainment

=== True crime award ===
Winner:

- David Canter, Criminal Shadows: Inside the Mind of the Serial Killer

Shortlist:

- Mikal Gilmore, Shot in the Heart
- G. Russell Girardin & William J. Helmer, Dillinger, The Untold Story
- Simon Rae, The Faber Book of Murder
- Philip Sugden, The Complete History of Jack the Ripper

=== Short story collection / anthology award ===
Winner:

- Tony Hillerman, The Mysterious West

Shortlist:

- James Ellroy, Hollywood Nocturnes
- Ed Gorman, A Modern Treasury of Great Detective Stories
- Maxim Jakubowski, London Noir
- Michele Slung & Roland Hartman, Murder for Halloween: Tales of Suspense

=== Movie award ===
Winner:

- Pulp Fiction

Shortlist:

- The Client
- Disclosure
- The Last Seduction
- Shallow Grave (1994 film)

=== Television series award ===
Winner:

- Prime Suspect

Shortlist:

- Between the Lines
- Cracker
- Homicide: Life on the Streets
- N.Y.P.D. Blue
