= Fly on the wall (disambiguation) =

Fly on the wall is a television or film documentary style.

Fly on the Wall may also refer to:

== Music ==
- Fly on the Wall (Bobby V album), 2011
- Fly on the Wall (AC/DC album), and the title song
  - Fly on the Wall (video), a 1985 music video tape by AC/DC
- Fly on the Wall: B Sides & Rarities, a 2003 compilation album by Paul Weller
- Fly on the Wall, the bonus disc of The Beatles' Let It Be... Naked album
- "Fly on the Wall" (song), a 2008 single by Miley Cyrus
- "(Fly) On (The Wall), a 1993 single by The Jesus Lizard
- "Fly on the Wall", a song by Exile from the album Shelter from the Night
- "Fly on the Wall", a song by Jay Rock from the album 90059
- "Fly on the Wall", a song by t.A.T.u. from the albums Vesyolye Ulybki and Waste Management
- "Fly on the Wall", a song by Thousand Foot Krutch from the album The End Is Where We Begin
- "Fly on the Wall", a song by XTC from the album English Settlement

== Other ==
- The Fly on the Wall, a 1971 novel by Tony Hillerman
- Barclays Capital Inc. v. Theflyonthewall.com, Inc., a 2011 court case concerning hot news misappropriation
- "Fly on the Wall", an episode of season 4 of Phineas and Ferb
- "Fly on the Wall" (The Thin Blue Line), a 1996 television episode
- Fly on the Wall, a podcast hosted by David Spade and Dana Carvey
