= Bouchercon XXXIII =

2002 mystery and detective fiction convention

- "Longhorns of the Law"
- Date: October 17, 2002
- Location: Austin, Texas
- Country: USA
- Hosted by: Karen Meschke, Willie Siros

Bouchercon is an annual convention of creators and devotees of mystery and detective fiction. It is named in honour of writer, reviewer, and editor Anthony Boucher; also the inspiration for the Anthony Awards, which have been issued at the convention since 1986. This page details Bouchercon XXXIII and the 17th Anthony Awards ceremony.

== Bouchercon ==
The convention was held in Austin, Texas on October 17, 2002; running until the 20th. The event was chaired by owner of the "Crime and Space" mystery bookstore, Willie Siros; and Karen Meschke, both co-founders of the Alamo Literary Arts Maintenance Organization.

=== Special Guests ===
- Guests of Honor — Mary Willis Walker, George Pelecanos
- Fan Guest of Honor — Bill Crider
- Fan Ghost of Honor — Barry Gardner
- Toastmaster — Sparkle Hayter

== Anthony Awards ==
The following list details the awards distributed at the seventeenth annual Anthony Awards ceremony.

=== Novel award ===
Winner:

- Dennis Lehane, Mystic River

Shortlist:

- Jan Burke, Flight
- Harlan Coben, Tell No One
- Rick Riordan, The Devil Went Down to Austin
- S. J. Rozan, Reflecting the Sky

=== First novel award ===
Winner:

- C. J. Box, Open Season

Shortlist:

- K. J. Erickson, Third Person Singular
- Jan Grape, Austin City Blue
- Denise Hamilton, The Jasmine Trade
- Andy Straka, A Witness Above

=== Paperback original award ===
Winner:

- Charlaine Harris, Dead Until Dark

Shortlist:

- Jeff Abbott, A Kiss Gone Bad
- Jerrilyn Farmer, Dim Sum Dead
- P. J. Parrish, Dead of Winter
- Daniel Stashower, The Houdini Specter

=== Short story award ===
Winner:

- Bill and Judy Crider, "Chocolate Moose", from Death Dines at 8:30

Shortlist:

- Ted Hertel Jr., "My Bonnie Lies...", from The Mammoth Book of Legal Thrillers
- Rochelle Krich, "Bitter Waters", from Criminal Kabbalah: An Intriguing Anthology of Jewish Mystery & Detective Fiction
- Margaret Maron, "Virgo in Sapphires", from Ellery Queen's Mystery Magazine December 2001
- S. J. Rozan, "Double-Crossing Delancy", from Mystery Street

=== Critical / Non-fiction award ===
Winner:

- Tony Hillerman, Seldom Disappointed: A Memoir

Shortlist:

- Max Allan Collins, The History of Mystery
- Jo Hammett, Dashiell Hammett: A Daughter Remembers
- G. Miki Hayden, Writing The Mystery: A Start to Finish Guide for Both Novice and Professional
- Jeffrey Marks, Who Was That Lady? Craig Rice: The Queen of Screwball Mystery

=== Young adult award ===
Winner:

- Penny Warner, The Mystery of the Haunted Caves

Shortlist:

- Michael Dahl, The Viking Claw
- Harriet R. Feder, Death on Sacred Ground
- Peni Griffin, Ghost Sitter
- Jeri Fink & Donna Paltrowitz, Matthew's Web

=== Cover art award ===
Winner:

- Josef Beck & Michael Storrings; for S. J. Rozan, Reflecting the Sky

Shortlist:

- Glenn Harrington; for Carole Nelson Douglas, Chapel Noir
- Annie Sperling; for Kit Sloane, Grape Noir
- Teresa Fasolino; for Rosemary Stevens, The Tainted Snuff Box
- John Warden & Anthony Ramondo; for Michael McGarrity, Under the Color of Law

=== Special service award ===
Winner:

- Doris Ann Norris

Shortlist:

No shortlist released
