= Finding Moon =

1996 novel by Tony Hillerman

- First edition
- Author: Tony Hillerman
- Genre: Mystery
- Set in: Southeast Asia
- Publisher: HarperCollins
- Publication date: 1996
- Media type: Hardcover
- Pages: 384
- ISBN: 0-06-109261-4

Finding Moon is a novel written in 1996 by Tony Hillerman, set in Southeast Asia.

== Plot ==
During the weeks immediately preceding to the 1975 Fall of Saigon that ended the Vietnam War, Malcolm "Moon" Thomas Mathias, manages the Press-Register, a small Colorado newspaper. He had always believed that his brother Ricky was the favorite child of their mother Victoria Mathias Morick. Ricky had been running a helicopter business in the Indochina peninsula, and married to a Vietnamese woman named Eleth Vinh. Both were killed by enemy fire, leaving behind young daughter Lila Vinh Mathias.

The first that the family learns of the existence of Lila is in a letter to Victoria from Ricky's attorney Roberto Bolivar Castenada in Manila, the Philippines. Victoria immediately books a flight to Manila to retrieve her grandchild, only to be stopped by a heart attack at Los Angeles International Airport. After receiving an emergency call from Philippine Airlines, Moon learns his mother is facing immediate heart surgery at Cedars-Sinai Medical Center. Moon was unaware that he had a niece, much less that his mother was en route to the Philippines. He learns the details going through her belongings while awaiting visitation at the hospital. After talking to her, Moon takes his mother's place to find Lila.

Upon Moon's arrival in Manila, he is approached by two of Ricky's clients. The elderly Lum Lee asks Moon to help him find a family urn containing ancestral bones. Mrs. Osa van Winjgaarden wants to accompany Moon on his quest, so that she may find her brother, a Lutheran missionary known as Brother Damon. With each new contact, Moon gradually learns more about his brother's business and associates. The quest takes him on a search through his own soul, as he engages in long talks with Father Julian in the confessional of the Manila Cathedral. Romance, political intrigue, the dangers of traveling through war zones, and hiding in the basement of a deserted building, are part of the action. Among the new, sometimes uneasy, alliances that he makes, is Nguyen Nung, a wounded ARVN deserter armed with a grenade launcher, and "SAT CONG" ("kill Viet Cong") tattooed on his chest.

== Characters ==
=== Stateside ===
The Mathias family

- Malcolm "Moon" Thomas Mathias – managing editor Press-Register, served in the armored division of the U. S. Army
- Richard "Ricky" Mathias – Moon's brother, founder of R. M. Air in Vietnam; died in Cambodia
- Martin Mathias – deceased father
- Victoria Mathias Morick – mother
- Dr. Tom Morick – Victoria's 2nd husband, and doctor to Martin Mathias.

Press-Register newspaper, Colorado

- Jerry Shakeshaft – publisher
- JD Shakeshaft – son of the publisher
- Rooney – featured articles, city desk
- Shirley – switchboard, office manager
- D. W. Hubble
- Edith – payroll

Other

- Sgt. Gene Halsey – Moon's best friend in the Army, at Fort Riley, Kansas; died in a jeep accident, caused by Moon's driving while intoxicated
- Dr. Serna – Victoria's doctor at Cedars-Sinai Medical Center in Los Angeles
- Dr. Jerrigan – ER doctor who saved Victoria's life
- Robert Toland – Philippine Airlines security officer at LAX
- Debbie – Moon's live-in girlfriend

=== Asia ===
- Eleth Vinh – wife of Ricky Mathias
- Lila Vinh Mathias – daughter of Eleth and Ricky
- Roberto Bolivar Castenada – Manila attorney for Ricky
- Lum Lee – seeking a family urn containing ancestral bones
- Mrs. Osa van Winjgaarden – wants Moon to find her brother
- Reverend Damon – Osa's Lutheran missionary brother in Cambodia

R. M. Air

- Incorporated in the Philippines, operating in Vietnam and Cambodia
- Thomas "Tommy" Brock – marketing manager, was supposed to get Lila on a flight to the United States
- George Rice – pilot who flew Lila to Saigon; also worked for the CIA; made arrangements for Lila to be transported to the United States.
- Robert Yager – chief pilot and deal maker for R.M. Air
- Pol Thiu Eng – employee who found Ricky's helicopter wreckage

Other

- Captain Teele – Glory of the Sea schooner
- Mr. Suhuannaphum – shore boat pilot who helps repair the schooner
- Nguyen Nung – rescued wounded sailor from the LST Sealord
- Lo Tho Dem – George Rice contact in Saigon
- Father Julian – Manila Cathedral

== Reception ==
Publishers Weekly stated, "Hillerman's mastery of setting and his compassionate, patient characterization are fully present in this tale, which is otherwise somewhat formulaic."
