= Tony Hillerman =

American writer (1925–2008)

- Born: Anthony Grove Hillerman; May 27, 1925; Sacred Heart, Oklahoma, U.S.
- Died: October 26, 2008 (aged 83); Albuquerque, New Mexico, U.S.
- Education: University of Oklahoma; University of New Mexico
- Occupations: Novelist, journalist, educator
- Spouse: Marie Unzner
- Children: 6, including Anne Hillerman
- Writing career
- Notable awards: 1974 Edgar Award for Best Novel; 1987 Grand Prix de Littérature Policière; 1988 Anthony Award; 1991 Nero Award; 1995 Anthony Award anthology 2002 Anthony Awards memoir Special Friends of the Dineh Award
- Military career
- Allegiance: United States
- Branch: United States Army
- Service years: 1943–1945
- Units: 103rd Infantry Division
- Conflicts: World War II
- Awards: Silver Star; Bronze Star Medal; Purple Heart

Anthony Grove Hillerman (May 27, 1925 – October 26, 2008) was an American author of detective novels and nonfiction works, best known for his mystery novels featuring the fictional Navajo Nation Police officers Joe Leaphorn and Jim Chee. Several of his works have been adapted for film and television, including the AMC series Dark Winds.

== Biography ==
=== Early life and family ===
Tony Hillerman was born in Sacred Heart, Oklahoma, to August Alfred Hillerman, a farmer and shopkeeper, and his wife, Lucy Grove. He was the youngest of their three children, and the second son. His paternal grandparents were born in Germany, and his maternal grandparents were born in England. He was a first cousin once removed of actor John Hillerman. He grew up in Pottawatomie County, Oklahoma, and attended elementary and high school with Potawatomi children.

Jeffrey Herlihy argues that this background made possible "a significantly different portrayal of Native Americans in his writing", in comparison to other authors of his time. "Most obviously important," Hillerman said of his childhood, "was growing up knowing that Indians are just like everybody else. You grew up without an 'us and them' attitude about other races."

=== World War II ===
Hillerman was a decorated combat veteran of World War II, serving from August 1943 to October 1945 as a mortarman in the 103rd Infantry Division in the European theatre. He earned the Silver Star, the Bronze Star Medal with Oak Leaf Cluster, and a Purple Heart. He was wounded in 1945, and the injuries included broken legs, foot, and ankle, facial burns, and temporary blindness.

=== Education ===
Hillerman attended the University of Oklahoma after the war, meeting Marie Unzner, a student in microbiology. The couple wed and had one biological child and five adopted children. He graduated in 1948 with a Bachelor of Arts (BA) degree in journalism.

=== Journalism ===
From 1948 to 1962, he worked as a journalist, moving to Santa Fe, New Mexico, in 1952. In 1966, he moved his family to Albuquerque, where he earned a master's degree from the University of New Mexico. During his time as a writer for the Borger News-Herald in Borger, Texas, he became acquainted with the sheriff of Hutchinson County, the man upon whom he would pattern the main character in his Joe Leaphorn novels. He taught journalism from 1966 to 1987 at the University of New Mexico in Albuquerque, and also began writing novels. He lived there with his wife Marie until his death in 2008. At the time of his death, they had been married 60 years and had 10 grandchildren.

=== Fiction ===
A consistently bestselling author, he was ranked as New Mexico's 22nd-wealthiest man in 1996. He wrote 18 books in his Navajo series. He wrote more than 30 books total, among them a memoir and books about the Southwest, its beauty, and its history. His literary honors were awarded for his Navajo books. Hillerman's books have been translated into eight languages, among them Danish and Japanese.

Hillerman's writing is noted for the cultural details he provides about his subjects: Hopi, Zuni, European settlers, federal agents, and especially the Navajo Nation Police. His works in nonfiction and in fiction reflect his appreciation of the natural wonders of the American Southwest and his appreciation of its indigenous people, particularly the Navajo. His mystery novels are set in the Four Corners area of New Mexico and Arizona, sometimes reaching into Colorado and Utah, with occasional forays to the big cities of Washington, DC, Los Angeles, and New York City. The protagonists are Joe Leaphorn and Jim Chee of the Navajo Nation Police. Lt. Leaphorn was introduced in Hillerman's first novel, The Blessing Way (1970). Sgt. Jim Chee was introduced in the fourth novel, People of Darkness (1980). The two first work together in the seventh novel, Skinwalkers (1986), considered his breakout novel, with a distinct increase in sales with the two police officers working together.

Hillerman repeatedly acknowledged his debt to an earlier series of mystery novels written by British-born Australian author Arthur W. Upfield and set among Aboriginal Australians in remote desert regions of tropical and subtropical Australia. The Upfield novels were first published in 1928 and featured a half-European, half-aboriginal Australian hero, Detective-Inspector Napoleon (Bony) Bonaparte. Bony worked with deep understanding of Aboriginal traditions. The character was based on the achievements of Tracker Leon, a biracial Aboriginal Australian man who worked for the Queensland Police and whom Upfield had met during his years in the Australian bush.

Hillerman discussed his debt to Upfield in many interviews and in his introduction to the posthumous 1984 reprint of Upfield's A Royal Abduction. In the introduction, he described the appeal of the descriptions in Upfield's crime novels. It was descriptions both of the harsh Outback areas and of "the people who somehow survived upon them" that lured him. "When my own Jim Chee of the Navajo Tribal Police unravels a mystery because he understands the ways of his people, when he reads the signs in the sandy bottom of a reservation arroyo, he is walking in the tracks Bony made 50 years ago."

He also mentioned Eric Ambler, Graham Greene, and Raymond Chandler as authors who influenced him as he wrote the Leaphorn and Chee novels.

In an interview published in Le Monde, Hillerman said his Navajo name means "He who is afraid of his horse".

=== Death ===
Tony Hillerman died on October 26, 2008, of pulmonary failure in Albuquerque at the age of 83, and was interred at Santa Fe National Cemetery.

== Recognition beyond the US ==
Hillerman's novels were popular in France. Hillerman credits that popularity both to French curiosity about other cultures and to his translator, Pierre Bondil.

== Legacy and honors ==
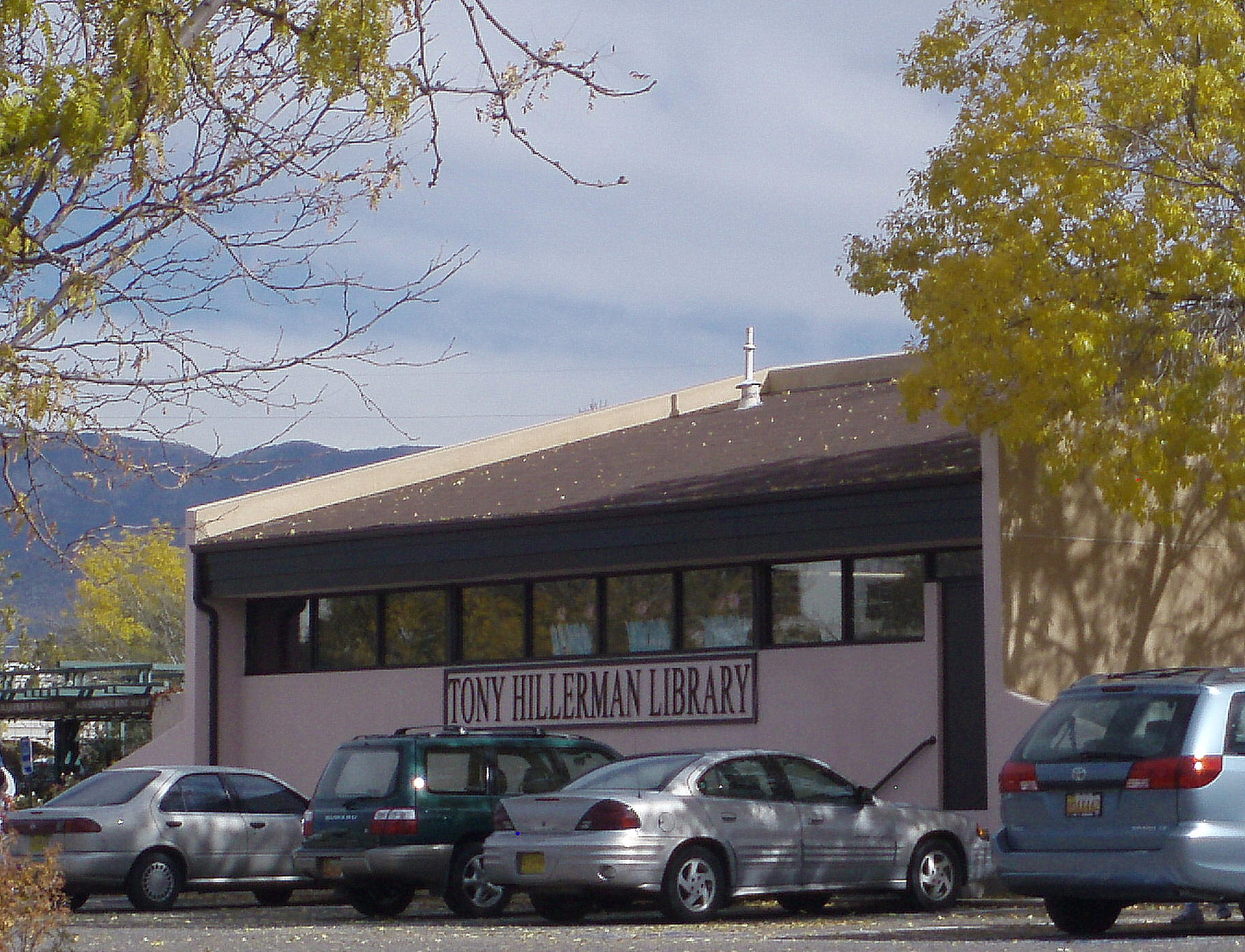
The Tony Hillerman Library in Albuquerque, named in his honor

Hillerman is considered one of New Mexico's foremost novelists. The Tony Hillerman Library was dedicated in Albuquerque in 2008, and the Tony Hillerman Middle School (part of Volcano Vista High School) opened in 2009. Dance Hall of the Dead, published in 1973, earned Hillerman the Grand Prix de Littérature Policière in 1987, a French international literary honor. Hillerman was awarded an Honorary Doctorate of Literature (Litt.D.) from the University of New Mexico in 1990. He was awarded the Owen Wister Award in 2008 for "Outstanding Contributions to the American West."

== Awards ==
Hillerman was a decorated combat veteran of World War II; he earned the Silver Star, the Bronze Star, and a Purple Heart as a mortarman in the 103rd Infantry Division.

He won and was nominated for numerous awards for his writing and his work with other writers. His first nomination came in 1972, with his novel The Fly on the Wall being nominated for an Edgar Award in the "Best Mystery Novel" category. Two years later his novel Dance Hall of the Dead, second book in the Leaphorn-Chee series, won the 1974 Edgar Award for Best Novel. He was again nominated for the "Best Mystery Novel" Edgar Award in 1979 for Listening Woman and lastly in 1989 for A Thief of Time. Hillerman's non-fictional work Talking Mysteries was nominated in 1992 for the Edgar Award in the "Best Critical or Biographical" category.

In 1987, Hillerman received the Grand Prix de Littérature Policière for Dance Hall of the Dead. In 1991, Hillerman received the MWA's Grand Master Award. Hillerman received the Nero Award for Coyote Waits and the Navajo Tribe's Special Friends of the Dineh Award.

Hillerman has also been successful at the annual Anthony Awards. His novel Skinwalkers won the 1988 Anthony Award for "Best Novel", and in the following year A Thief of Time was nominated for the 1989 Anthony Award in the same category. His next nomination was for his Talking Mysteries non-fictional work which was nominated at the 1992 Anthony Awards. His novel Sacred Clowns received a "Best Novel" nomination at the 1994 Anthony Awards, and the following year his short-story collection The Mysterious West won the 1995 Anthony Award in the "Best Anthology/Short Story Collection" category. His last win came at the 2002 Anthony Awards at which he won the "Best Non-fiction/Critical Work" award for his memoir Seldom Disappointed.

Two of the Navajo Police novels won The Spur award, given by the Western Writers of America annually. Skinwalkers won the award in 1987 for Western Novel, and The Shape Shifter won in 2007 for Best Western Short Novel.

Seldom Disappointed: A Memoir won the Agatha Award in 2001.

Hillerman's novels were recognized at the Macavity Awards. A Thief of Time won the "Best Novel" award in 1989, and Talking Mysteries won the "Best Critical/Biographical" award in 1992. Seldom Disappointed also received a nomination in the "Best Biographical/Critical Mystery Work" category in 2002.

He received the Parris Award in 1995 by Southwest Writer's Workshop for his outstanding service to other writers. In 2002, Hillerman received the Agatha Malice Domestic Award for Lifetime Achievement, given by Malice Domestic for mystery novels in the spirit of Agatha Christie.

== Published works ==
=== Joe Leaphorn and Jim Chee books ===
The first three books feature Joe Leaphorn only and as a supporting secondary character in the first novel. The next three books feature Jim Chee only. Leaphorn and Chee begin working together in the seventh novel, Skinwalkers.

1. The Blessing Way (1970); ISBN 0-06-011896-2
2. Dance Hall of the Dead (1973); ISBN 0-06-011898-9
3. Listening Woman (1978); ISBN 0-06-011901-2
4. People of Darkness (1980); ISBN 0-06-011907-1
5. The Dark Wind (1982); ISBN 0-06-014936-1
6. The Ghostway (1984); ISBN 0-06-015396-2
7. Skinwalkers (1986); ISBN 0-06-015695-3
8. A Thief of Time (1988); ISBN 0-06-015938-3
9. Talking God (1989); ISBN 0-06-016118-3
10. Coyote Waits (1990); ISBN 0-06-016370-4
11. Sacred Clowns (1993); ISBN 0-06-016767-X
12. The Fallen Man (1996); ISBN 0-06-017773-X
13. The First Eagle (1998); ISBN 0-06-017581-8
14. Hunting Badger (1999); ISBN 0-06-019289-5
15. The Wailing Wind (2002); ISBN 0-06-019444-8
16. The Sinister Pig (2003); ISBN 0-06-019443-X
17. Skeleton Man (2004); ISBN 0-06-056344-3
18. The Shape Shifter (2006); ISBN 978-0-06-056345-5

=== Continuation of Leaphorn and Chee series ===
In 2013, Hillerman's daughter Anne Hillerman published Spider Woman's Daughter (ISBN 0062270486), the first new novel since 2006 featuring Hillerman's Navajo Police characters; the novel's protagonist is Jim Chee's wife, Officer Bernadette Manuelito. Leaphorn's involvement is curtailed in the first chapter of the book. Leaphorn is the victim of an assassination attempt, spends half of the book in a coma, and later is severely limited in his ability to communicate. Chee and Bernadette Manuelito are the crime solvers from that book forward in the series, with Leaphorn never fully active in the investigations (though he regains his faculties over time and consults often).

1. 2013 Spider Woman's Daughter ISBN 978-0-06-227048-1.
2. 2015 Rock With Wings ISBN 978-0-06-227051-1.
3. 2017 Song of the Lion ISBN 978-0-06-239190-2.
4. 2018 Cave of Bones ISBN 978-0-06-239192-6.
5. 2019 The Tale Teller ISBN 978-0-06-239195-7.
6. 2021 Stargazer ISBN 978-0-06-290833-9.
7. 2022 The Sacred Bridge ISBN 978-0-06-290836-0.
8. 2023 The Way of the Bear ISBN 978-0-06-290839-1.
9. 2024 Lost Birds ISBN 978-0-06-334478-5.
10. 2025 "Shadow of the Solstice" ISBN 9780063344853.

=== Three-in-one volumes ===
- The Joe Leaphorn Mysteries: Three Classic Hillerman Mysteries Featuring Lt. Joe Leaphorn: The Blessing Way, Dance Hall of the Dead, Listening Woman (1989); ISBN 0-06-016174-4
- The Jim Chee Mysteries: Three Classic Hillerman Mysteries Featuring Officer Jim Chee: People of Darkness, The Dark Wind, The Ghostway (1990); ISBN 0-06-016478-6
  The first appearance of Jim Chee in the Leaphorn-Chee series is in People of Darkness. In these three books, Joe Leaphorn is only briefly mentioned once, as "Captain Leaphorn at the Chinle substation" (POD, ch. 6). In the later books, where he is again prominent along with Jim Chee, he is "Lieutenant Leaphorn."
- Leaphorn & Chee: Three Classic Mysteries Featuring Lt. Joe Leaphorn and Officer Jim Chee : Skinwalkers, A Thief of Time, Talking God (1992), ISBN 0-06-016909-5; reprinted (2001), ISBN 0-06-018789-1
- Tony Hillerman: Three Jim Chee Mysteries: People of Darkness, The Dark Wind, The Ghostway (1993); ISBN 0-517-09281-6
- Tony Hillerman: The Leaphorn & Chee Novels: Skinwalkers, A Thief of Time, Coyote Waits (2005); ISBN 0-06-075338-2
- Tony Hillerman: Leaphorn, Chee, and More: The Fallen Man, The First Eagle, Hunting Badger (2005); ISBN 0-06-082078-0

=== Other novels ===
- The Fly on the Wall (1971) ISBN 0-06-011897-0
- The Boy Who Made Dragonfly (for children) (1972) ISBN 0-06-022312-X
- Buster Mesquite's Cowboy Band (for children) (1973) ISBN 0-914001-11-6
- Finding Moon (1995) ISBN 0-06-017772-1

=== Other books by Hillerman (memoirs and nonfiction) ===
- The Great Taos Bank Robbery (1973); ISBN 0-8263-0306-4
- The Spell of New Mexico (1976); ISBN 0-8263-0420-6
- Indian Country (1987); ISBN 0-87358-432-5
- Talking Mysteries (with Ernie Bulow) (1991); ISBN 0-8263-1279-9
- The Tony Hillerman Companion: A Comprehensive Guide to His Life and Work by Hillerman, Martin Greenberg (1994); ISBN 0-06-017034-4
- Canyon De Chelly (1998); ISBN 1-893205-25-8
- Seldom Disappointed: A Memoir by Tony Hillerman (2001); ISBN 0-06-019445-6

=== Anthologies ===
- Best of the West: An Anthology of Classic Writing from the American West (1991); ISBN 0-06-016664-9
- The Mysterious West (1995); ISBN 0-06-017785-3
- The Oxford book of American Detective Stories (1996); ISBN 0-19-508581-7
- Best American Mysteries of the Century (2000) ISBN 978-1448711246
- New Omnibus of Crime (2005); ISBN 0-19-518214-6

=== About Hillerman, nonfiction, by others ===
- The Ethnic Detective: Chester Himes, Harry Kemelman, Tony Hillerman by Peter Freese – including a detailed analysis of Listening Woman (1992); ISBN 978-3-892-06502-9
- Tony Hillerman: A Critical Companion (Critical Companions to Popular Contemporary Writers) by John M. Reilly (1996); ISBN 978-0-313-29416-7
- Tony Hillerman: A Life by James McGrath Morris (2021); ISBN 978-0-8061-7598-0
- Tony Hillerman's Indian Country Map & Guide, first edition by Time Traveler Maps by Tony Hillerman (1998); ISBN 1-892040-01-8
- Tony Hillerman's Navajoland: Hideouts, Haunts and Havens in the Joe Leaphorn and Jim Chee Mysteries by Laurance D. Linford, Tony Hillerman (2001); ISBN 0-87480-698-4
  Expanded Third Edition (2011); ISBN 978-1-60781-137-4.
- Tony Hillerman's Indian Country Map & Guide, second edition by Time Traveler Maps by Tony Hillerman (2003); ISBN 1-892040-10-7

=== Books of photos ===
- Rio Grande, Robert Reynolds (text by Hillerman) (1975) ISBN 0-912856-18-1
- New Mexico, photography by David Muench (text by Hillerman) (1975) ISBN 0-912856-14-9
- Indian Country: America's Sacred Land, Bela Kalman (text by Hillerman) (1987) ISBN 0-87358-432-5
- Hillerman Country (1991) ISBN 0-06-016400-X
- Kilroy Was There: A GI's War in Photographs (2004) ISBN 0-87338-807-0 (with Frank Kesseler)

== Adaptations ==
- The Blessing Way was adapted into a five-part installment of The Zero Hour syndicated radio program in 1973, hosted by Rod Serling.
- The Dark Wind (1991) is a film adaptation of The Dark Wind from the Leaphorn and Chee book series.
- Skinwalkers: The Navajo Mysteries (2002) is a PBS miniseries that adapted Skinwalkers, Coyote Waits, and A Thief of Time from the Leaphorn and Chee book series.
- Dark Winds (2022) is a TV series on AMC adapted from the Leaphorn and Chee book series.
