= The Dark Wind =

Novel by Tony Hillerman

- First edition
- Author: Tony Hillerman
- Cover artist: Myers & Noftsinger
- Language: English
- Series: Joe Leaphorn/Jim Chee Navajo Tribal Police Series
- Genre: Detective fiction
- Set in: Navajo Nation and Hopi Reservation in Southwestern United States
- Publisher: Harper & Row
- Publication date: 1982
- Publication place: USA
- Media type: Print and audio
- Pages: 214
- ISBN: 0-06-014936-1
- OCLC: 7738198
- Preceded by: People of Darkness (1980)
- Followed by: The Ghostway (1984)

The Dark Wind is a crime novel by American writer Tony Hillerman, the fifth in the Joe Leaphorn/Jim Chee Navajo Tribal Police series, published in 1982. It is the second of the novels to feature Officer Jim Chee.

Now working from Tuba City, Sgt. Chee is assigned four cases by Capt. Largo. A drug-smuggling plane crashes, and Largo insists Chee stay away from that case, a tough challenge as he gathers information from Hopis, European Americans, and Navajos to solve the original cases.

Reviewers found this to have a "classic Hillerman plot", involving a plane crash, possibly illegal drugs, and a vandalized windmill on the Joint-Use lands. It is "relentlessly introspective" and "with Hillerman's moodily fine prose in full Southwest regalia", as the Hopi and the Navajo ways are contrasted, and Chee explores a white man's motivation, of revenge.

== Plot summary ==
Jim Chee is assigned four cases to solve by Captain Largo, his new boss at the Tuba City, Arizona office of the Navajo Tribal Police. One is to ascertain who stole jewelry from the Burnt Water trading post, and to find the paroled man suspected of the thievery, Joseph Musket. The third is to find who is vandalizing a windmill in the Joint-Use lands recently allotted to the Hopi. Fourth is to learn the identity of the Navajo man found dead on the path to Kisigi Spring.

While he is on stakeout near the windmill one night, a small plane crash lands in the Wepo Wash. Chee runs to the crash, finding the pilot and his passenger dead, and a man sitting up in a business suit, holding a card, murdered. As he approaches, he hears someone leaving on foot in the early morning darkness. He also hears a gunshot, most likely the one that killed the man in the business suit, and sees headlights of a vehicle leaving the scene. The airplane was carrying illegal cargo, likely drugs, and the DEA agents, in particular T. L. Johnson, are possessive of their law enforcement turf.

As Chee collects information on Joseph Musket and on the unidentified corpse, he gradually learns information related to the crash and the drug deal. Johnson finds this as reason to invade Chee's home in the morning, including beating Chee up, in Johnson's usual style. Johnson puts forward that Chee was present so soon after the plane crashed because Chee is part of the drug smuggling. The deteriorated condition of the corpse, found over a week after death, makes identification impossible. Later, Albert Lomatewa provides the exact date of death and how the corpse looked, hands and feet flayed as if by a Navajo "skinwalker", or witch. Chee meets Jake West, owner of the Burnt Water trading post, where the jewelry theft was reported, and briefly the employer of Musket. West's son, Thomas Rodney West, was killed recently in prison; he had been friends with Joseph Musket since childhood. Chee presses Cowboy Dashee to arrange an interview with the Hopi elder responsible for a shrine near the windmill. Dashee translates. Chee makes a deal with Taylor Sawkatewa: Chee will bring supplies to stop that windmill, which interferes with water flow around the shrine, in return for Sawkatewa telling all he saw and heard in the time it took Chee to reach the plane crash site. A man forced another to place the landing lights in the wrong place, and then shot him dead. Items were removed from the plane but they were not placed in the car that left the scene. From the pilot's sister, Chee learns a meeting is set up for transfer of the drugs during a private Hopi kachina ceremony. She wants revenge, or justice, for her brother's death. Revenge is not a Navajo concept, so Chee struggles to understand it as motivation.

Chee arrives at Sityatki, the old Hopi village, having retrieved the two aluminum suitcases filled with cocaine from their hiding place in the sand at the crash site. Both Jake West and Johnson appear, the former expected, the latter a surprise. West has killed the drug kingpin, figuring he is responsible for his son's murder while he was held in prison. Johnson is there not truly as a DEA agent, but as the man who wants these drugs, which he claims are worth $15 million. After Chee arrests and handcuffs West, Johnson does the same to Chee. As this encounter unfolds, a rare intense rainstorm breaks the long drought, rapidly making dangerous rivers in the usually dry arroyos. At Chee's vehicle, Johnson gets the suitcases of cocaine. Johnson's plan is to kill the other two. Chee explains how Johnson visited Thomas West in prison, such that the other prisoners assumed he was a snitch and killed him in regular confinement. Johnson could have handled that so Thomas lived. Jake West understands this means he killed the wrong man in revenge for his son's death. Chee grabs one suitcase and throws it at Johnson. It then slides to the river which horrifies Johnson, who runs to save the cocaine. West follows and pushes Johnson into the river. Chee tells West that the unidentified corpse will be checked against Joseph Musket's prison dental records, and it is clear that West killed Musket. West says that the jewelry reported stolen is hidden in his kitchen, just before he dies from the gunshot wound received from Johnson. West killed six men before reaching Johnson to avenge his son's murder. Chee reflects that all this time, Capt. Largo insisted that Chee stay out of the drug smuggling case. Not wanting to be criticized, Chee hurls the other suitcase full of cocaine into the raging river, all other active cases having been solved.

== Characters ==
- Jim Chee: Navajo officer in the Navajo Tribal Police. He is now at Tuba City, AZ office, under Captain Largo. He is skilled in tracking in that desert part of the world.
- Deputy Cowboy Albert Dashee, Jr: Hopi man, works as one of the deputies for Coconino County Sheriff's office in Arizona. He is of the Side Corn Clan. He and Chee are becoming friends in law enforcement.
- Albert Lomatewa: older Hopi man, the Messenger for Niman Kachina ceremony and first person to find the dead Navajo, day of death and body condition later revealed to Sgt. Chee and Deputy Dashee.
- Robert Pauling: pilot of small plane killed by crash landing due to being guided by landing lights put in wrong place.
- Jerry Jansen: Man found dead next to plane, dressed in a business suit holding a business card from the Hopi Cultural Center and a brief note handwritten on the back. He is an attorney from Texas
- T. L. Johnson: a rough DEA agent who decides Chee is part of the drug smuggling business, beats Chee at his home, wrecks his property, and proves in the end to be the same as the drug dealers he should be arresting.
- Larry Collins: a young DEA agent, about 25 years old, who assisted in the beating of Chee, whose arms were handcuffed behind him.
- Miss Gail Pauling: older sister of the pilot Robert who was killed, she came to area to learn who killed him. She wants some revenge or justice.
- Ben Gaines: lawyer to Robert Pauling, accompanied Miss Pauling to crash site, to learn what happened to him. He is considered part of drug smuggling ring by the DEA.
- Richard Palinzer: Suspected by DEA as the recipient of the smuggled drugs. He was found dead in the hidden car by Chee, body gone by the time Dashee found the car.
- Mrs. Fannie Musket: mother of Joseph, Navajo woman who spoke with Chee about her son's character and plans to find a wife.
- Joseph Musket: young Navajo man, recently out of prison, given job with West's trading post, until he was fired for suspected theft. He had cash in his pockets. Nicknamed Ironfingers, because his hands had been injured and he wore metal splints while they healed, about 30 years old. Involved earlier in drug crimes. Killed by Jacob West.
- Thomas Rodney West: son of Jake West, once a Marine, friend to Joseph Musket, recently killed in prison, about 30 years old. Musket calls him his only friend among the white men.
- Jacob (Jake) West: runs Burnt Water trading post, willing to share useful information with Chee about people in the area; likes to do magic tricks. He is a large man with a full beard, once married to a Hopi woman. He believes in revenge, and takes it.
- Taylor Sawkatewa: old Hopi man who has ceremonial duties near the windmill. He negotiates a deal with Sgt. Chee to reveal what he saw and heard the night of the plane crash.
- Albert: friend of Tom West in prison, who later explains to Chee what DEA agent Johnson did to West, taking him out of the prison so other prisoners would think him a snitch, though he said nothing.
- Drug kingpin: man who arrives at Hopi village during ceremonial in hopes of buying back the drugs on the crashed airplane. Instead, Jacob West kills him.

== Themes ==
The novel has a major theme of the culture, religion and myths of the Hopi people, and some of the contrasts between Hopi ways and Navajo ways. The Hopi and the Navajos shared a view of the land that did not require rigid boundaries and exclusive ownership. Arrival of Europeans and contact with the US forced the notion of exclusive ownership, raising up problems of a new nature between the tribes. Views of nature and death are contrasted between the two cultures, especially in conversations between the Navajo policeman and the Hopi deputy sheriff. Revenge is another theme driving the plot, a concept Chee finds unfamiliar, so he studies it.

== Allusions to real events and places ==
The plot makes reference to Joint Use lands with both Navajo and Hopi making use of the land. This is a long-standing dispute, and even the resolution mentioned in the story, a 1974 public law and following court cases assigning one large area for the Hopi, requiring thousands of Navajos to move, did not resolve the issue. Although the situation was in some sense settled by a 1996 law, the issues continue to this day. The Hopi have lived in this large area for thousands of years, arriving before the Navajo. Further, the people of each tribe have different patterns of settlement (Navajo are dispersed over larger amount of land, originally from their occupation as sheepherders, while the Hopi are generally settled in villages, raise corn, make art and jewelry).

The corpse is found on the path to Kisigi Spring, which is an important Hopi spruce shrine. It is a real place, but its exact location is not mapped, to keep it more private.

The Hopi village of Sikyatki is more of a ruin than the novel suggests, Tony Hillerman says in the author's note. "Time has been even crueler to the village of Sityatki [sic] than is suggested herein. It was abandoned long ago and sand has drifted over what remains of its ruins."

The ceremonies and sacred places of the Hopi on the mesas in their reservation are mentioned often and incorporated in the plot. Hillerman says "Like Jim Chee of the Navajo Tribal Police, I am an outsider on the Hopi Mesas. I know only what one learns from long and respectful interest, and suggest that any of you who wish to learn more of the complex Hopi metaphysics turn to more knowledgeable writers. I particularly recommend The Book of the Hopi by my good friend Frank Waters."

== Geography ==
In his 2011 book Tony Hillerman's Navajoland: Hideouts, Haunts, and Havens in the Joe Leaphorn and Jim Chee Mysteries, author Laurance D. Linford has listed the following 63 geographical locations mentioned in The Dark Wind.

1. Albuquerque, NM
2. Bacavi, AZ
3. Balakai Mesa
4. Balakai Point, AZ
5. Big Mountain, AZ
6. Big Mountain Trading Post, AZ
7. Black Mesa, AZ
8. Blue Hill, NM
9. Blue Point, AZ
10. Burnt Water, AZ
11. Cameron, AZ
12. Cameron Trading Post, AZ
13. Cedar Ridge Trading Post, AZ
14. Chuska Mountains, NM & AZ
15. Coconino Rim, AZ
16. Colorado River, CO, UT, & AZ
17. Cottonwood, AZ
18. Crownpoint, NM
19. Durango, CO
20. Dzilidushushznini Peaks, AZ
21. Farmington, NM
22. Flagstaff, AZ
23. Gallup, NM
24. Garces Mesa, AZ
25. Hano, AZ
26. Hopi Buttes, AZ
27. Hotevilla, AZ
28. Joint Use Reservation, AZ
29. Keams Canyon, AZ
30. Kisigi Spring (location withheld)
31. Little Black Spot Mountain, AZ
32. Low Mountain, AZ
33. Many Farms, AZ
34. Mexican Water Trading Post, AZ
35. Mishongnovi, AZ
36. Moenkopi, AZ
37. Moenkopi Wash, AZ
38. Navajo Mountain, UT & AZ
39. Newberry Mesa, AZ
40. Oraibi, AZ
41. Oraibi Wash, AZ
42. Padilla Mesa, AZ
43. Painted Desert, AZ
44. Piutki (fictional ancient Hopi settlement)
45. Polacca Wash, AZ
46. San Francisco Peaks, AZ
47. Santa Fe, NM
48. Second Mesa, AZ
49. Shipaulovi, AZ
50. Sichomovi, AZ
51. Sikyatki, AZ (called Sityatki in the text)
52. Teec Nos Pos, AZ
53. Third Mesa, AZ
54. Tse Chizzi Wash, AZ
55. Tuba City, AZ
56. Twentynine Mile Canyon, AZ
57. Two Grey Hills, NM
58. Walpi, AZ
59. Wash, AZ
60. Wepo Wash, AZ
61. Window Rock, AZ
62. Winslow, AZ
63. Yon Dot Mountains, AZ

== Adaptations ==
The novel was adapted as the feature film The Dark Wind in 1991. It starred Lou Diamond Phillips as Jim Chee, Fred Ward as Joe Leaphorn and Gary Farmer as Cowboy Dashee. It was directed by Errol Morris, a documentary film-maker making his dramatic feature debut. Robert Redford was executive producer, hoping for a series of films, but he was unhappy with the production and director. In an article on the successful adaptation of Skinwalkers in 2002, Redford said of The Dark Wind that the film wasn't any good and it wasn't released. "That was a false start," Redford says. "It was miscast. It was ill-conceived and I didn't think it was the right beginning for the series. It wasn't distributed.""

There are substantial differences between the movie and the novel, as the movie focussed heavily on the conflict that arose between Navajo and Hopi in the Joint Use areas, and the subsequent court case that decided the issues, where the novel has four cases for Jim Chee to solve, and in the process to aid the federal agencies in the case of the crashed plane carrying drugs into the US.

Redford would later bring the series to PBS's Mystery, making three films from later novels in the series.

== Sources ==
- Linford, Laurance D. (2011). "Index of Places by Hillerman Title". Tony Hillerman's Navajoland: Hideouts, Haunts, and Havens in the Joe Leaphorn and Jim Chee Mysteries. University of Utah Press. ISBN 978-1-60781-988-2 – via Project MUSE.
