= The Fly on the Wall =

1971 novel by Tony Hillerman

- First edition
- Author: Tony Hillerman
- Genre: Mystery
- Set in: USA
- Publisher: Harper & Row
- Publication date: 1971
- ISBN: 0-06-011897-0
- OCLC: 162698

The Fly on the Wall is a 1971 political crime novel by Tony Hillerman. The story features journalist John Cotton and is set in the unnamed capital city of an unnamed Midwestern state.

== Title ==
The title of this novel is derived from American journalist Walter Lippmann's metaphor about newspaper reporters, " ...‘the fly on the wall,’ seeing all, feeling nothing, utterly detached, utterly objective ...’’.

== Plot ==
Set in 1971, in the fictitious Capitol City, the story is interwoven with political machinations. Reporter John Cotton of the afternoon Tribune newspaper is in the state capitol building's press room filing his column on the day's political events. An intoxicated Merrill "Mac" McDaniels of the morning Capitol-Press arrives from a long drinking session with Speaker of the House Bruce Ulrich. Mac believes he has just uncovered a story that will be the crowning achievement of his career. Telling Cotton he's leaving to search for his missing notebook, Mac is found dead seven minutes later, several levels down from the press room, on the floor of the capitol rotunda.

Cotton finds Mac's missing notebook in the rear of a desk drawer, and is puzzled by the columns of unexplained figures on one page. The words "Rebar" and borrow stand out. He enlists the help of Janey Janoski, executive secretary for the Legislative Finance Committee, to help him decode Mac's notes and uncover the story that may have ended Mac's life. Janoski identifies "rebar" as material related to highway construction and finds that “borrow” can mean soil borrowed to build up a roadbed. Then Cotton pours through state government records and talks to staff, finding evidence of a complex scheme to double bill the state for concrete meant to be used in road projects while leaving no trail easy to audit. Highway Department staff, a main contractor and a re-insurance company are all involved.

William "Whitey" Robbins of the Gazette is driving Cotton's automobile when it is rammed by a stolen semi-trailer truck, plunging into the Rush River. Robbins dies instantly, and the truck is abandoned. Although a witness provides a physical description of the driver, he is not found. Initial reports identified the accident victim as Cotton. Cotton speaks to Officer Endicott and Captain Whan about the accident. Whan raises the possibility that the accident was an attempt to kill Cotton.

Alan Wingerd, Governor Roark's press secretary, tries to bribe Cotton. Turning down the offer, and returning home, Cotton receives a telephone threat on his life. He goes fishing in New Mexico, only to be stalked by a killer named Adams. Cotton hooks Adams with his fishing rod, injuring him and ending the chase, and then returns to Capitol City. Captain Whan confirms Adams' real identity as Randolph Allen Harge, an organized crime hit man. Cotton wonders what makes him such a threat. Whan registers him in a motel under the alias of Robert Elwood, and lets him know that he does not have enough manpower to protect him 24 hours a day.

Cotton informs managing editor Ernie Danilov that he is back in town; the Tribune prints a notice on the editorial page saying the columnist is on sick leave. On a rented typewriter in his motel room, Cotton begins to write his story. He takes Janoski into his confidence, and asks her to contact his colleague. Cotton calls the people implicated in his investigation to hear their denials. He is lured into a trap at the capitol building by the killers. After a frantic chase, he escapes to Janoski's apartment, where he re-types his story. He gives one copy to Janey to file for publication and keeps the other copy himself, realizing that the only way to end these attempts on his life is to print the story. He then talks with Joseph Korolenko, old man of Roark’s party, to understand why the scheme of double billing for concrete was done. Korolenko is quite active in supporting Governor Roark in his plan to run for Senator against Clark; Korolenko got money to start that campaign from the company benefitting from the scam, not telling Roark of the link to corruption in his Highway Department. Korolenko has deep antipathy for Clark, who ruined Korolenko’s chances to run for senator in 1954. Korolenko aims his loaded rifle at Cotton, so angry that this graft story will be the main news. Adams aka Harge appears at Korolenko’s door, to dispose of Cotton. Korolenko says, orders are changed; we are waiting to see if the article has been published. If so, there is no need to dispose of Cotton. Cotton is pleased that Janey gave the story to the wire; she trusts him. The story is in print; Korolenko leaves Harge to hold Cotton for 30 minutes at the house. When Harge leaves, the police are waiting outside and arrest him. Cotton rides with Captain Whan, and hears the news on the radio of a homicide in a downtown hotel. Korolenko has killed Clark and surrendered himself to police. Cotton, who had been ready to quit his job and leave town, realizes that Korolenko has made a story to overshadow the corruption story, and Korolenko may need a skilled journalist to get through this next stage, so he decides to stay.

== Reception ==
Kirkus Reviews stated, "It will do, even if he did better in The Blessing Way."

The Chicago Tribune included this novel in a review of books and a play about newspaper reporting, written from 1905 to 2004. The book was summed up thus: “The thinking and documents-based reporting of investigative newshound John Cotton could serve as a textbook of sorts on the practice--and limitations--of journalism.”
