= Sacred Clowns =

Novel by Tony Hillerman

- First edition cover
- Author: Tony Hillerman
- Cover artist: Peter Thorpe
- Language: English
- Series: Joe Leaphorn/Jim Chee Navajo Tribal Police Series
- Genre: Detective fiction
- Set in: Navajo Nation in Southwestern United States
- Published: 1993 HarperCollins
- Publication place: USA
- Media type: Print and audio
- Pages: 305
- Awards: nominated 1994 Anthony Award for Best Novel
- ISBN: 0-06-016767-X
- OCLC: 28025657
- Preceded by: Coyote Waits (1990)
- Followed by: The Fallen Man (1996)

Sacred Clowns is a crime novel by American writer Tony Hillerman, the eleventh in the Joe Leaphorn/Jim Chee Navajo Tribal Police series, first published in 1993.

Murders happen on both the Navajo reservation and the Tano Pueblo. One happens during a Tano ceremonial, with the koshares (sacred clowns) and kachinas performing. Leaphorn is in charge of a new investigation unit, with Chee as his sole staff support.

== Plot ==
Shop teacher Eric Dorsey is murdered at the mission school in Thoreau, for no obvious reason. Delmar Kanitewa slips out of his boarding school in Crownpoint, and his grandmother pushes the Navajo Tribal Police to find the boy. Lt. Joe Leaphorn heads up a new unit for investigations, with Jim Chee as his staff. Chee and Bureau of Indian Affairs officer Sgt. Harold Blizzard learn the boy came home to his mother the day the teacher was killed. Delmar had a package with him, for his uncle, to do with religion. Delmar said he must see his uncle a second time and left. Janet Pete, Cowboy Dashee and Ashton Davis meet up at the Tano ceremonial of kachinas and koshares, where Chee spots Delmar. He slips away before they can tell him to call his grandmother. The ceremonial includes Delmar’s uncle, Francis Sayesva, who is a koshare. In a break of the ceremonial, Francis is found murdered, not 40 yards from where Chee is standing.

A hit and run driver leaves his victim to die on the road, making a homicide of Victor Todachene’s death. The chief of the NTP really wants the driver found. Leaphorn asks Chee to find this driver. The driver speaks anonymously over the local radio apologizing for what he did. He will send money to the family. The radio station staff notice enough about the man for Chee to find Clement Hoski. Chee trails him home, seeing grandson Ernie get off the school bus. After talking with Ernie, a special needs child, Chee puts off arresting his grandfather.

The murders of two valuable men, Dorsey and Sayesva a few days apart, done the same way, has Leaphorn looking for connections. He finds one when a second search of Dorsey’s workshop and a visit with Sayesva’s brother reveal the story of the Lincoln cane possessed by the Tano Pueblo since 1863. Dorsey made a replica of it, based on the ebony wood shavings and silver mold found. The Lincoln cane is kept by the governor of the pueblo, currently Bert Penitewa, who has the original safe in his office. The boy Delmar visited Dorsey to get something for a friend, and seeing the cane, explained its story to Dorsey, who is shocked and angry at how he has been used. Delmar left with the replica cane, under instructions from Dorsey to give it to his people, the Tano. As Delmar leaves, a man enters, and that is the one who kills Dorsey. Delmar gives the replica cane to his uncle, who uses it in the ceremonial, as he worries that the governor might sell the original. Then he is killed, and the replica cane disappears.

Chee is distracted completely by the change in his relationship with Janet Pete, local lawyer and long time friend. He is in love, but now he must learn if the Navajo incest taboo in any way prevents them from being more than friends. He takes off for two days to consult with his uncle Frank Sam Nakai and another hataalii. He leaves without explaining a cassette tape that he plays in the tape player in Leaphorn’s office. The tape is of a phone call between Navajo Councilman Jimmy Chester and Ed Zeck, lawyer for the firm seeking to use an old open mine for a toxic waste dump site. They discuss money, leaving an appearance of pay-off. The tape is also played over the local radio station in the public time. The next day, while Chee is with his uncle, Leaphorn is suspended in response to the furious Councilman demanding an investigation. The suspension forces Leaphorn to cancel his trip to China, planned with Prof. Bourbonette. He wants to visit Mongolia, while she has colleagues to see there.

Leaphorn finds that this is the second replica that Dorsey made. Chee returns to work, explains the tape. That ends the suspension for Leaphorn. The two search Dorsey’s office one more time, noticing that the sketch for the first replica cane is written on the blank side of a flyer from two years earlier, prepared by an environmental group led by Roger Applebee. Dorsey has no connection with this group. Applebee needed someone reliable to get the first cane sold privately two years earlier, and that must be his friend Ashton Davis, a trusted dealer in Indian artifacts.

Chee presents his ethical dilemma with the Hoski case to Janet Pete. She meets young Ernie, and watches Chee give him a new bumper sticker to put on his grandfather’s truck, with a message to take the old one off, or the police might stop him. The Navajo approach to Hoski’s problem is to help him get back in the blessing way. The law will arrest Hoski, taking him away from his grandson. Leaphorn feels the arrest will earn Chee promotion to sergeant, which Chee ignores. Janet Pete is pleased with Chee’s actions, and they become lovers.

Delmar recognizes Applebee’s face in the newspaper as being the man he saw. Leaphorn calls Dilly Streib, the FBI agent on the Dorsey case, to arrest Applebee. Within hours, Streib tells Leaphorn that Davis killed Applebee in front of the FBI, and then turned himself in. Davis saw the second replica cane at the Tano ceremonial, and knows he has no future as an honest trader. He has no part in the second one, but its existence makes his role in the first one known. Applebee made this second cane to ruin the Tano governor. Applebee played the tape of the phone call to ruin the Councilman, as he took the other side in the dispute about the toxic waste dump. The call was not about payoffs, but the cattle business that Chester and Zeck have together. Leaphorn learns that Louisa did not go on the trip without him when she appears at Saint Bonaventure Mission School, finally learning where he is.

== Characters ==
- Police and agents
  - Joe Leaphorn: Lieutenant in the Navajo Tribal Police, based in the Window Rock office. He is widowed for a year and a half.
  - Jim Chee: Officer in Navajo Tribal Police who joined the new special investigations office under Lt. Leaphorn. He works in Window Rock now.
  - Albert ‘Cowboy’ Dashee: Deputy Sheriff in Apache County. He is Hopi and a good friend to Chee.
  - Sgt. Harold Blizzard: Bureau of Indian Affairs officer. He is a Cheyenne, just two months in this area. He grew up in the city, never on the Cheyenne reservation. He is assigned to the Sayesva murder.
  - David ‘Dilly’ W. Streib: FBI agent from the Farmington office, investigating the Dorsey murder. He is a long time agent, making his retirement plans, introduced in Skinwalkers.
  - Virginia Toledo: Administrative Assistant at the Window Rock office of the Navajo Tribal Police, who keeps track of everyone there.
  - Lt. Toddy: Farmington police officer for the area where Dorsey is found murdered.
  - Captain Dodge: Officer of the Navajo Tribal Police who leads the investigation into the tape of a conversation between Zeck and Chester that was played on the local radio station, but more ominously, heard by Sgt. Yazzie days before being played in the police offices, on Leaphorn’s tape player.
- Murder victims
  - Victor Todachene: Old man killed by a car that hit him. Driver looked to see him and drove away, leaving the man to bleed to death. He was part of the Tano pueblo.
  - Eric Dorsey: Teacher, age 37, of wood and metal work. Known for his care for people and his ability to make people laugh. He was murdered at the Saint Bonaventure Indian Mission high school at Thoreau, New Mexico on the Checkerboard reservation.
  - Francis Sayesva: One of the sacred clowns, koshares who make people laugh showing human foibles, who was clubbed to death during a ceremonial at the Tano pueblo. He is the maternal uncle of Delmar. He is a CPA in daily life.
- All others
  - Janet Pete: Attorney for DNA, the Navajo legal aid. She is half Navajo. Her father’s family was relocated to Chicago in the 1940s. She is assigned to defend Eugene Ahkeah. She is a long time friend of Chee; their relationship becomes romantic.
  - Asher Davis: Reputable Indian trader, friend to Dashee. He went to high school with Applebee.
  - Bertha Roanhorse: She is on the Navajo tribal council, and paternal grandmother of Delmar.
  - Delmar Kanitewa: Boy whose grandmother asks the police to find him. His father is Navajo and his mother is Tano, divorced. Delmar lives with his father since going to high school at Crownpoint NM. He ran away from the school.
  - Robert Sakani: Cousin to Delmar, who was supposed to drive him from ceremony back to school.
  - Felix Bluehorse: Best friend of Delmar Kanitewa. Delmar picked up a silver bracelet that Felix made from the Saint Bonaventure school, and met Felix in his father's pick-up truck outside the school.
  - Father Haines: Catholic priest at Saint Bonaventure Mission School.
  - Teddy Sayesva: Brother of Francis.
  - Mrs. Kanitewa: Tano mother of Delmar. She lives on the Tano Pueblo.
  - Roger Applebee: Attorney in Nature First charity based in Santa Fe. Janet Pete knows him from Washington DC. He opposes the toxic waste dump.
  - Mr. Bert Penitewa: Elected governor of the Tano Pueblo, holder of their Lincoln cane, and one who came out in favor of the mine being used as a toxic waste dump about two years earlier. The next election is coming soon.
  - Louisa Bourebonette: Professor at Arizona State University in Flagstaff, AZ and friend to Leaphorn. They met in Coyote Waits.
  - Eugene Ahkeah: Friend of Eric Dorsey and handyman at the same school. He is picked up by police from an anonymous phone tip that the items stolen when Dorsey was murdered will be found under Akheah’s trailer.
  - Hosteen Frank Sam Nakai: Maternal uncle to Chee, his “little father” and a respected hataalii.
  - Hosteen Barbone: Nakai and Chee visit this hataalii about Chee's question of the incest taboo.
  - Old Woman Mustache: Wise elder woman with Barbone, who made clear that the incest taboo depends mainly on the clans of the mothers.
  - Ed Zeck: He is a lawyer at the Dalman firm (where Pete once worked), and serves as counsel to Continental Collectors, in favor of the waste dump. His is one of two voices on the cassette tape left anonymously with Chee.
  - Jimmy Chester: He is on the Navajo Tribal Council. His is the other voice on cassette tape left anonymously with Chee. Chester is Navajo and is expecting a check from Zeck, over $20 thousand, per that tape of a phone call.
  - Gray Old Lady Benally: Navajo woman about 80 years old with ill husband, great grandmother to Delmar. This couple benefits from Dorsey’s charitable actions, like bringing water, food, and making a special rocking chair for her.
  - Clement Hoski: He is a Navajo who works at the Navajo farm, handles produce, and hit Todachene with his truck, while he was driving drunk. He raises his grandson. He confessed over the local radio, without giving his name.
  - Ernie: Grandson of Clement Hoski, he is a boy showing the signs of fetal alcohol syndrome, limiting his development.

== Allusion to real places and events ==
One of the murders takes place at Saint Bonaventure School in Thoreau, New Mexico. This is a real school, part of the Catholic mission for the eastern part of the reservation. It has been in operation over forty years. Hillerman acknowledges the school and specific people in it in the dedication of the book. The name of the town is pronounced like threw as the town was named for an engineer, not the American writer Henry David Thoreau.

The Lincoln canes figure in the plot. These were ebony canes with a silver head given by President Lincoln to recognize 19 Pueblo tribes for their neutrality in the Civil War and their acknowledgment of US sovereignty following the Mexican War. The canes follow a tradition begun by the Spanish. Some photos are included in the Smithsonian collection of tribal governors posed holding their cane, indicating the significance the canes held for the Pueblo tribes.

The lands of the eastern portion of the Navajo Nation, in New Mexico, are called the Checkerboard reservation. This arose from the way in which land was given to railroads in the 19th century, leaving questions of who owns land, a problem for police jurisdictions among others. Saint Bonaventure Mission is located in the Checkerboard.

== Geography ==
In his 2011 book Tony Hillerman's Navajoland: Hideouts, Haunts, and Havens in the Joe Leaphorn and Jim Chee Mysteries, author Laurance D. Linford has listed the following 67 geographical locations, real and fictional, mentioned in Sacred Clowns.

- Albuquerque, New Mexico
- Angel Peak, New Mexico
- Arizonatec, New Mexico
- Beautiful Mountain, New Mexico
- Bisti (Badlands and Trading Post), New Mexico
- Bitani Tsosi Wash, New Mexico
- Bloomfield, New Mexico
- Borrego Pass Trading Post, New Mexico
- Bosque Redondo, New Mexico
- Chaco Mesa, New Mexico
- Checkerboard Reservation, New Mexico
- Chico Arroyo, New Mexico
- Chinle, Arizona
- Chivato Mesa, New Mexico
- Chuska Mountains, New Mexico and Arizona
- Coyote Canyon, New Mexico
- Coyote Pass Chapter (fictional location)
- Coyote Wash, New Mexico
- Crownpoint, New Mexico
- Crystal, New Mexico
- De Na Zin Wilderness, New Mexico
- Escavada Wash, New Mexico
- Fajada Wash, New Mexico
- Farmington, New Mexico
- Flagstaff, Arizona
- Gallup, New Mexico
- Grants, New Mexico
- Greasy Water Trading Post (fictitious location)
- Hopi Mesas (Hopi Reservation), Arizona
- Hotevilla, Arizona
- Iyanbito, New Mexico
- Jemez Pueblo, New Mexico
- Kayenta, Arizona
- Kimbeto Wash, New Mexico
- Kirtland, New Mexico
- Lake Valley, New Mexico
- Mexican Water Trading Post, Arizona
- Mishongnovi, Arizona
- Mount Taylor, New Mexico
- Nahodshosh Chapter (fictitious location)
- Nakaibito (also Mexican Springs), New Mexico
- Naschitti Trading Post, New Mexico
- Navajo Agricultural Industries, New Mexico
- NArizonahoni Trading Post, New Mexico
- Newcomb, New Mexico
- Picuris Pueblo, New Mexico
- Pojoaque Pueblo, New Mexico
- San Juan River, Colorado, New Mexico and Utah
- Santa Fe, New Mexico
- Sheep Springs, New Mexico
- Shiprock (Community), New Mexico
- Shungopovi, Arizona
- Standing Rock, New Mexico
- Tano Pueblo (fictitious location)
- Tesuque Pueblo, New Mexico
- Thoreau, New Mexico
- Toadlena, New Mexico
- Tohatchi, New Mexico
- Torreon, New Mexico
- Tsé Bonito (Park), New Mexico
- Tse Chizzi Wash, Arizona
- Tuba City, Arizona
- Two Grey Hills, New Mexico
- Walpi, Arizona
- Window Rock, Arizona
- Ya Tah Hey, New Mexico
- Zuni Pueblo, New Mexico

== Development ==
In an interview in September 1993 at Recorded Books, Tony Hillerman mentioned the 3 year gap since the last novel. He was ready to write another book sooner, but personal situations intervened: his brother died, then Tony Hillerman got cancer, both of which slowed him down. In the chronology of the novels, it is just six months after the prior novel (Leaphorn was widowed a year in Coyote Waits and 18 months in this novel). The way of life in the pueblos was the starting point for the plot. For hundreds of years, the pueblo peoples have no police with batons, no punishments. Rather the kachinas, representing the spirits, and the koshares, representing foolish humans, show the wayward recent actions in the pueblo. The koshares use laughter and public scorn as the ways to keep their people on the right path. They are very private about their culture, so Hillerman invented a pueblo for the novel; there is no Tano pueblo in real life, in contrast with the real mission school. Hillerman reports the mission school to be a success, so he honored it by including it and its people in the plot.

== Awards ==
The novel was nominated for the 1994 Anthony Award for Best Novel.

== Sources ==
- Linford, Laurance D. (2011). "Index of Places by Hillerman Title". Tony Hillerman's Navajoland: Hideouts, Haunts, and Havens in the Joe Leaphorn and Jim Chee Mysteries. University of Utah Press. ISBN 978-1-60781-988-2 – via Project MUSE.
