= Balakai Mesa =

Mountain in Arizona, United States

- Location within Arizona

Highest point
- Elevation: 7,447 ft (2,270 m) NAVD 88
- Prominence: 1,044 ft (318 m)
- Coordinates: 35°59′02″N 109°56′16″W

Geography
- Location: Apache County, Arizona
- Topo map: USGS Toadimdaaska Mesa

Balakai Mesa is a summit in the U.S. state of Arizona.

Balakai Mesa is a name derived from the Navajo language meaning "place with reeds on it".
