= The Mysterious West =

1994 anthology edited by Tony Hillerman

- First edition cover
- Editor: Tony Hillerman
- Cover artist: Wendell Minor
- Subject: The American West
- Genre: Mystery fiction, Short stories
- Published: 1994
- Publisher: HarperCollins, HarperTorch
- Pages: 392
- Awards: Anthony Award for Best Short Story Collection (1995)
- ISBN: 0-06-017785-3 First edition hardcover

The Mysterious West is a 1994 anthology edited by Tony Hillerman and published by HarperTorch. The book went on to win the Anthony Award for Best Short Story Collection in 1995.

== Development of anthology ==
Hillerman selected twenty short mystery stories about the American West, by twenty different Western authors. The stories are set in a variety of locations, from Berkeley, California and Las Vegas, Nevada to the Alaskan bush.

== List of story titles and authors ==
- Forbidden Things by Marcia Muller
- New Moon and Rattlesnakes by Wendy Hornsby
- Coyote Peyote by Carole Nelson Douglas
- Nooses Give by Dana Stabenow
- Who Killed Cock Rogers? by Bill Crider
- Caring for Uncle Henry by Robert Campbell
- Death of a Snowbird by J.A. Jance
- With Flowers in Her Hair by M.D. Lake
- The Lost Boys by William J. Reynolds
- Tule Fog by Karen Kijewski
- The River Mouth by Lia Matera
- No Better Than Her Father by Linda Grant
- Dust Devil by Rex Burns
- A Woman's Place by D.R. Meredith
- Postage Due by Susan Dunlap
- The Beast in the Woods by Ed Gorman
- Blowout in Little Man Flats by Stuart M. Kaminsky
- Small Town Murder by Harold Adams
- Bingo by John Lutz
- Engines by Bill Pronzini

== Reviews ==
Kirkus Reviews was disappointed that there was not more written by Tony Hillerman, the editor of this collection of short stories, than the introduction to each story. They did identify the best of the short stories as, "Marcia Muller's bittersweet memoir of a young woman's abortive homecoming, Linda Grant's reunion of a daughter with her eccentric, threatened father, Susan Dunlap's deadpan account of a loony hostage-taking in Berkeley, Ed Gorman's spare, chilling tale of a boy whose father is maddened by a run of bad luck -- typically subordinate atmosphere to the exploration of (generally troubled) family ties." And they noted the "least successful -- the undernourished whodunits by Dana Stabenow, Bill Crider, and Rex Burns, the postcard landscapes of Karen Kijewski and Bill Pronzini -- seem swallowed up by their settings; and the main interest of the tales by Carole Nelson Douglas and Stuart M. Kaminsky is to watch their tenderfoot creators pick their way gamely through the sagebrush." The concept of the regional viewpoint was considered novel.

Library Journal recommended this book and another anthology of stories by Western writers for library collections, for the different perspective of each book. One is Talking Up a Storm: Voices of the New West by Gregory L. Morris of Pennsylvania State University, who interviewed Western authors who were "all "postmodernist" and "postregionalist" in their perspectives", and who offer "insights into what direction the new Western literary tradition seems to be headed." The other is The Mysterious West, a less weighty book, with "20 short stories, primarily mystery and detective fiction", each introduced by Tony Hillerman. In sum, the 20 stories had "fictional landscapes here [that] range from the desolation, silence, and danger of Death Valley, and the small, dying towns of southern Colorado to the sophisticated originality and zaniness of Berkekey, California." The two books together introduce a reader to Western literature.

== Publication history ==
This anthology was first released in hardcover in 1994. A paperback edition was released in 1995, using a different cover.
