= Joe Leaphorn =

- The Leaphorn and Chee series character
- First appearance: The Blessing Way
- Last appearance: The Shape Shifter
- Created by: Tony Hillerman
- Portrayed by: Fred Ward; Wes Studi; Zahn McClarnon

In-universe information
- Gender: Male
- Occupation: Navajo tribal police officer
- Nationality: Diné

Lieutenant Joe Leaphorn is a fictional character created by the 20th-century American mystery writer Tony Hillerman. He is one of the two officers of the Navajo Tribal Police who are featured in a number of Hillerman's novels. The other officer is Jim Chee.

== Character biography ==
=== Personal life and education ===
The mother of Joe Leaphorn was Anna Gorman. His maternal grandfather was Hosteen Klee Thlumie, called Hosteen Klee by young Leaphorn. As a child, Leaphorn was told the stories of the Navajo way of life (Listening Woman) by Thlumie. He was educated in the lower grades near home on the reservation, but sent to boarding school for the higher grades. He attended college at Arizona State University, where he completed a master's degree in anthropology, writing a thesis paper (Dance Hall of the Dead). In addition to anthropology, he has a lifelong interest in the many religions of American Indians and peoples of the world. In the earlier books of the series, Leaphorn is married to the love of his life, Emma. They have no children. Emma has survived an episode of cancer, but experiences a recurrence which she does not survive. Leaphorn is devastated.

Later, Leaphorn becomes attracted to an anthropologist named Louisa Bourebonette, whom he meets while working on a case in Coyote Waits. Leaphorn is always in love with Emma, but he enjoys Louisa's sharp mind and her company.

Leaphorn lives in the Navajo capital of Window Rock, Arizona.

=== Professional life ===
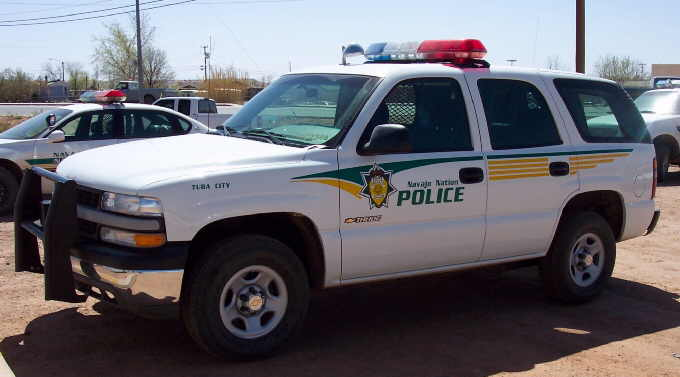
Joe Leaphorn is a member of the Navajo Tribal Police (now Navajo Nation Police)

Educated in assimilationist Indian boarding schools operated by the Bureau of Indian Affairs, he is not as well versed in Navajo rituals, though he has attended the usual ceremonies. He is fluent in Navajo and in English. In the first three novels of the series, he has no staff; he reports to Captain Largo in the Navajo Tribal Police and works with officers of other tribes and often with federal investigative agencies. Leaphorn's approach to his cases is informed by some Navajo, or Diné, tradition, but also by Anglo-European logic.

Leaphorn holds a Navajo world view, with no expectation of heaven in the afterlife, instead a need to find his place in this life and lead his life well. He follows the rules of courtesy of the Navajo as to the ebb and flow of conversations, and his ability to handle demanding characters from the white world around him. In Talking God, the year following the death of his wife, Leaphorn has a Blessing Way ceremony done for him by Jim Chee, an event that both find beneficial.

In his career he works in a number of locations, including a brief stint training at the FBI headquarters in Washington, D.C. Five months before The Fallen Man, Leaphorn retires, and as part of the plot he gets a commission as a private investigator.

== Reception ==
Several reviewers have praised Hillerman's culturally sensitive depiction of the Leaphorn character. Kirkus Reviews noted the "quiet, wise presence of Leaphorn himself, unselfconsciously drawing on the best of two clashing cultures." Another Kirkus review praised "Hillerman's anything but wooden Indians and the way in which he informs their way of life with affection and dignity." Greg Herren wrote, "What makes Skinwalkers so outstanding, for me, is that it takes the reader inside the world of the Navajo reservation".

== Bibliography ==
Joe Leaphorn appears in the following novels:

- The Blessing Way (1970) ISBN 0-06-100001-9
- Dance Hall of the Dead (1973) ISBN 0-06-100002-7
- Listening Woman (1978) ISBN 0-06-100029-9

In the three novels published between 1978 and 1986, the stories focus on the younger Jim Chee.

In each of the following Leaphorn and Jim Chee work together:

- Skinwalkers (1986) ISBN 0-06-100017-5
- A Thief of Time (1988) ISBN 0-06-100004-3
- Talking God (1989) ISBN 0-06-109918-X
- Coyote Waits (1990) ISBN 0-06-109932-5
- Sacred Clowns (1993) ISBN 0-06-109260-6
- The Fallen Man (1996) ISBN 0-06-109288-6
- The First Eagle (1998) ISBN 0-06-109785-3
- Hunting Badger (1999) ISBN 0-06-109786-1
- The Wailing Wind (2002) ISBN 0-06-019444-8
- The Sinister Pig (2003) ISBN 0-06-019443-X
- Skeleton Man (2004) ISBN 0-06-056344-3
- The Shape Shifter (2006) ISBN 0-06-056345-1
- Spider Woman's Daughter (October 2013) (written by Anne Hillerman) HarperCollins ISBN 9780062270481
- Rock With Wings (May 2015) (written by Anne Hillerman) HarperCollins ISBN 9780062270511
- Song of the Lion (April 2017) (written by Anne Hillerman)

== Appearances in other media ==
=== Film ===
- The Dark Wind (1991), adapted from the novel of the same name, stars Fred Ward as Leaphorn.

=== Television ===
- In 2002 the novels Skinwalkers, A Thief of Time and Coyote Waits were adapted as part of the American Mystery! series by the Public Broadcasting Service (PBS). Leaphorn was portrayed by Wes Studi.
- The AMC series Dark Winds, which adapts several of the Hillerman novels, stars Zahn McClarnon as Leaphorn.
