= Jim Chee =

- First appearance: People of Darkness
- Last appearance: The Shape Shifter
- Created by: Tony Hillerman
- Portrayed by: Lou Diamond Phillips; Adam Beach; Kiowa Gordon

In-universe information
- Gender: Male
- Occupation: Navajo tribal police officer
- Nationality: Diné

Jim Chee is one of two fictional Navajo Tribal Police detectives in a series of mystery novels by Tony Hillerman. Unlike his superior Joe Leaphorn, the "Legendary Lieutenant", Chee is a staunch believer in traditional Navajo culture; indeed, he is studying to be a traditional healer at the same time that he is a police officer.

== Profile ==
=== Personal life ===
Jim Chee is an acting sergeant in the Navajo Tribal Police when he first appears in People of Darkness, working in the Crownpoint, New Mexico, office. He has two older sisters. His mother and his mother's brother (his little father) and her two sisters (his little mothers) are still alive and also part of his life. His uncle, Hosteen Frank Sam Nakai, is frequently helpful to Chee, whose advice runs through Chee's mind, and whose tapes of the words for various Navajo rituals aid Chee in memorizing them. From childhood on, Chee is remarked for his excellent memory, detailed and exact.

Chee's education is similar to that of Lt. Leaphorn, as he studied anthropology at the University of New Mexico after having attended the boarding high school at Tohatchi, New Mexico, described in People of Darkness. In Coyote Waits, Chee mentions that he took about seven years to graduate from college, as he had to skip a term to earn tuition money. Both came from families or clans with many singers, or yataalii. Chee's Navajo name, given him by his maternal uncle, is Long Thinker. When Chee first appears in the novels, he is younger than the age Lt. Leaphorn appeared, and still a single man.

=== Police work ===
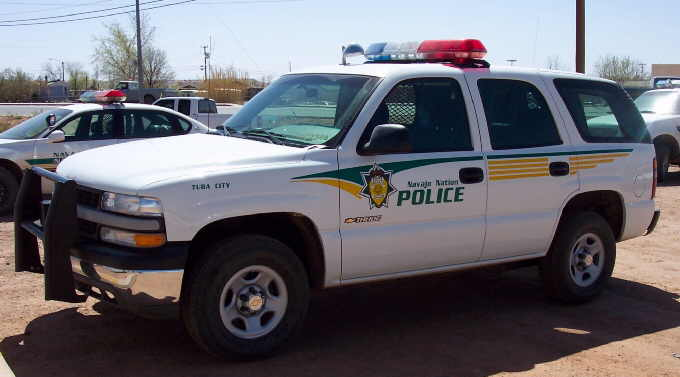
Jim Chee is a member of the Navajo Tribal Police (now Navajo Nation Police)

Chee and Leaphorn first meet and work together in Skinwalkers, when an attempt was made on Chee's life as he slept. Chee knows the reputation Leaphorn has for his success in police work, and after Leaphorn retires, Chee thinks of Leaphorn as legendary and always smarter than Chee is. Chee is willing to call on Leaphorn whenever he is stuck with a particular problem in a case.

== Development of the character ==
Hillerman writes in his autobiography, Seldom Disappointed (2001), that he created Jim Chee as an alternative to Leaphorn for the novel People of Darkness (1980), because the novel is set on the Checkerboard Reservation, and Hillerman felt that Leaphorn was too hardened to fit into the plot. He needed someone more naive, and Chee fit the bill.

== Appearances in other media ==
In the 1991 theatrical film adaptation of The Dark Wind, Chee was played by Lou Diamond Phillips.

Three of the Hillerman novels (Skinwalkers, Coyote Waits, and A Thief of Time) were adapted for television as part of the PBS series Mystery!, as part of its American Mystery! specials. In these adaptations, Chee was played by actor Adam Beach. Skinwalkers first aired November 24, 2002; A Thief of Time first aired July 11, 2003, and Coyote Waits first aired November 16, 2004.

Kiowa Gordon portrays Chee in the AMC TV series Dark Winds.

Robert Redford purchased the film rights to the characters in 1988, and served as the executive producer for all of the film and television adaptations.

== Bibliography ==
Jim Chee appears in the following novels:

Written by Tony Hillerman

- People of Darkness (1980)
- The Dark Wind (1982)
- The Ghostway (1984)
- Skinwalkers (1986)
- A Thief of Time (1988)
- Talking God (1989)
- Coyote Waits (1990)
- Sacred Clowns (1993)
- The Fallen Man (1996)
- The First Eagle (1998)
- Hunting Badger (1999)
- The Wailing Wind (2002)
- The Sinister Pig (2003)
- Skeleton Man (2004) ISBN 0-06-056344-3
- The Shape Shifter (2006)

Written by Anne Hillerman

- Spider Woman's Daughter (2013)
- Rock With Wings (2015)
- Song of the Lion (2017)
- Cave of Bones (2018)
- The Tale Teller (2019)
- Stargazer (2021)
- The Sacred Bridge (2022)

In every novel from Skinwalkers on, Chee is joined by Joe Leaphorn; Anne Hillerman’s continuation of the series puts Chee’s wife Bernadette Manuelito in the main protagonist role, with Chee and Leaphorn assisting with her cases.
