= Seldom Disappointed =

2001 book by Tony Hillerman

- First edition
- Author: Tony Hillerman
- Language: English
- Genre: Memoir
- Publisher: HarperCollins
- Publication date: 2001
- Publication place: United States
- Media type: Print (hardcover)
- ISBN: 9780062302106

Seldom Disappointed: A Memoir is the 2001 autobiography of author Tony Hillerman.

== Reception ==
The work was well received, with the New York Times Book Review stating that Hillerman "is an expert at knowing what to leave out, and at making what he leaves in cut to the bone without seeming overwrought", and further that the prose is "laced with humor and worldly wisdom"; stating that "Seldom Disappointed is a splendid and disarming remembrance of things past". It was also well reviewed by David Langness, for Paste magazine, who called the book "touching", "modest" and "powerful", and stated that "Seldom Disappointed unfolds with the quiet country cadences of the storytellers that consistently suffuse Hillerman's prose" and praising its "hilarious, perverse black humor".

== Awards ==
- 2001 Agatha Award, best non-fiction work
- 2002 Anthony Award, best non-fiction / critical work
- 2002 Macavity Award nomination, best biographical / critical mystery work
