= The Fallen Man =

1996 novel by Tony Hillerman

- First edition cover
- Author: Tony Hillerman
- Cover artist: Peter Thorpe
- Language: English
- Series: Joe Leaphorn/Jim Chee Navajo Tribal Police Series
- Genre: Detective fiction
- Set in: Navajo Nation in Southwestern United States
- Publisher: HarperCollins
- Publication date: 1996
- Publication place: USA
- Media type: Print and audio
- Pages: 294
- ISBN: 0-06-017773-X
- OCLC: 35212753
- Preceded by: Sacred Clowns (1993)
- Followed by: The First Eagle (1998)

The Fallen Man is a crime novel by American writer Tony Hillerman, the twelfth in the Joe Leaphorn/Jim Chee Navajo Tribal Police series, first published in 1996.

A group of mountain climbers discover a corpse on Shiprock. Retired Joe Leaphorn and Acting Lieutenant Jim Chee work together, as Leaphorn recalls an old missing person case. Captain Largo is concerned with the theft of cattle, which case introduces Officer Bernadette Manuelito.

== Plot summary ==
In late fall, three climbers who scaled Shiprock find a corpse, a skeleton in climber's gear, on a nearly inaccessible shelf just below the peak. Acting Lieutenant Jim Chee is trying his hand at administration of the special investigations unit. Captain Largo is pressing them to work on cattle thieving. Joe Leaphorn, retired five months earlier, cautiously approaches Chee with his memory of a missing person case from eleven years before, never solved. Hal Breedlove is a likely candidate, as he was mountain climber always seeking challenges, and Shiprock is a most challenging climb. It is Hal, which news Chee brings to Hal's widow Elisa on their ranch near Mancos, Colorado. The couple and her brother Eldon Demott had been celebrating their fifth wedding anniversary and Hal's birthday on a trip to the reservation, including Canyon de Chelly. She inherited the ranch once he was declared dead; Hal got full ownership of it on his thirtieth birthday, just before he disappeared.

Chee is engaged to marry Janet Pete, but they have a dispute arising from John McDermott, her former boss and lover. Chee turns his focus to mastering the administrative duties of his job. Rookie officer Bernadette Manuelito is taking initiative on the cattle rustling problems; she asks Lucy Sam to watch and record events near her hogan. Lucy uses the format her late father used in his ledgers, which were started before 1985. Manuelito figures out that Dick Finch, the cattle brand inspector and a law man himself, is the most likely suspect.

John McDermott calls Joe Leaphorn to work as a private investigator. McDermott comes out from Washington DC with George Shaw, cousin to Hal and part of the Edgar Breedlove family. Shaw pays for Leaphorn's time, because the family wants to regain possession of the ranch. Leaphorn gathers information and keeps in touch with Chee. Chee returns to Lucy Sam and on second look, he finds that Hosteen Sam observed three climbers on Shiprock, September 18, 1985, two days before Hal's crucial birthday. Chee proceeds directly to Hosteen Austin Maryboy, who collects fees from climbers wanting to begin their climb from his property. Maryboy is shot dead, just a few minutes before Chee arrives. Despite great care in his exit, Chee is shot twice through the car door just after he radios his location. Colleague Teddy Begayaye rescues Chee. Neither sees the attacker in the dark night. From his hospital bed, Chee tells Leaphorn that he went to see Maryboy to learn if he remembers the three climbers from that day in 1985. Leaphorn praises Chee for the new facts, which open up the investigation. Leaphorn thinks the Demotts are the most likely candidates for the past death, if it was murder, and for the present shootings of Nez and Maryboy. Both saw the group in 1985. Nez met them at Canyon de Chelly after September 20. Nez survives, so it is important to protect him. Leaphorn uses a helicopter and his friend Rosebrough to take pictures of the climbers’ log atop Shiprock, revealing a third date, September 30, when only Hal Breedlove signed the book, with the Latin aphorism, vita brevis. Chee shows the photograph of the signature to Elisa, who falls apart in tears. Chee goes home to meet Janet Pete, who says she is taking leave to go home and reconsider her life.

Leaphorn shows photographs to Amos Nez at his hogan. Nez does not recognize Hal Breedlove. The man he knew as Breedlove is Eldon Demott. Leaphorn drives to a point above Nez's hogan, where he expects Eldon will come to kill Nez. Eldon arrives and hears from Leaphorn how strong the evidence is to convict him for killing Maryboy and for shooting Chee. Those two would put him in prison for life, and rightly so. Eldon wants to keep his sister out of the trouble Hal and then Eldon have made, and to save the ranch from mining. The shooting of Nez, now of no FBI interest, would become interesting if Nez testifies in court. Eldon reveals that all three went climbing, but Elisa stopped short of the peak. Leaphorn tells Eldon how the situation plays out depends on him. Eldon writes a note to his sister that he did not kill Hal, it was an accident, but leaves the confusion of dates standing. Abruptly, he runs off the edge of the cliff into the Canyon del Muerto. Leaphorn heads home, leaving no evidence of his own presence, and tells Chee, off-duty, what went on. Chee in turn tells him how Officer Manuelito arrested Dick Finch today, caught in the act of stealing cattle in his vehicle.

== Characters ==
- Joe Leaphorn: Lieutenant in the Navajo Tribal Police, retired about five months earlier, and widowed a few years.
- Jim Chee: Acting Lieutenant in the Navajo Tribal Police, based in Shiprock.
- Emma Leaphorn: Late wife of Joe, whose cause of death we learn was not the benign brain tumor successfully removed, but a staph infection contracted in the hospital afterward.
- Janet Pete: Attorney for DNA, the public defenders for the Navajo Nation, and fiancée of Jim Chee. Introduced in A Thief of Time.
- Harold (Hal) Breedlove: Heir of family ranch when he turned 30 in 1985 who became a missing person from Canyon de Chelly on the Navajo Nation.
- Elisa Breedlove: Widow of Harold and a kind woman, running a cattle ranch with her brother in Colorado. She had been married to Hal for five years when he disappeared.
- Eldon Demott: Older brother of Elisa Breedlove by 12 or 13 years, who works the ranch with her. He is a mountain climber, and called a "tree hugger" by the local banker.
- Tommy Castro: Friend of Eldon Demott from high school who climbed with him years earlier. He pursued Elisa before she married Hal, and Eldon discouraged him, saying he is too old for his young sister.
- Bill Buchanan: One of three climbers on Shiprock at the end of October.
- John Whiteside: Climber on Shiprock, risk taker, traverses at the cliff edge, and sees a shelf with a climber's helmet and a skull in it.
- Jim Stapp: One of the three climbers on Shiprock who find the skeleton.
- John McDermott: Attorney for the Edgar Breedlove family, and formerly connected with Janet Pete as professor, employer and lover. First mentioned in Talking God.
- George Shaw: Cousin and friend to Breedlove, mountain climber, and lawyer. He was executor for the will when Hal was declared dead. Now the family wants to investigate.
- Dick Finch: Cattle brand inspector for New Mexico.
- Hosteen Austin Maryboy: Navajo who owns the property at the approach to the climb of Shiprock and asks for payment from climbers to be on his land. He is murdered after the skeleton is found and identified.
- Hosteen Amos Nez: Guide for the Breedloves eleven years earlier, when they toured Canyon de Chelly. He is shot by a sharpshooter immediately after the skeleton is found and identified, but he lives.
- Captain Largo: Chee's superior officer at the Shiprock office of the Navajo Tribal Police.
- Bernadette Manuelito: Rookie officer in the special investigations unit, 26 years old, eager to learn how to be a detective. She was already assigned to the unit before Chee took over.
- Teddy Begayaye: Officer in Navajo Tribal Police special investigations unit who rescues Chee when he is shot.
- Hosteen Sam: Old Navajo man who watched the mountain of Shiprock, keeping a daily ledger of natural and human activities he could see from his hogan with the aid of a powerful telescope, beginning more than eleven years earlier. He died a year before the story begins.
- Lucy Sam: His daughter, who saves her father's ledgers and resumes observations at the request of Officer Manuelito to aid in finding the cattle rustlers.
- Elliott Lewis: FBI agent, three weeks out of FBI training school, who pursues the murder of Austin Maryboy.
- Bob Rosebrough: Lawyer friend of Leaphorn, and a mountain climber, who agrees to go up in the helicopter to the top of Shiprock to photograph the pages in the climbers log. He is named for a real person.

== Geography ==
In his 2011 book Tony Hillerman's Navajoland: Hideouts, Haunts, and Havens in the Joe Leaphorn and Jim Chee Mysteries, author Laurance D. Linford has listed the following 57 geographical locations mentioned in The Fallen Man.

1. Albuquerque, New Mexico
2. Aztec, New Mexico
3. Beautiful Mountain, New Mexico
4. Beclabito, New Mexico
5. Bloomfield, New Mexico
6. Bridge Timber Mountain, Colorado
7. Burnham, New Mexico
8. Canyon de Chelly National Monument, Arizona
9. Canyon Del Muerto, Arizona
10. Carrizo Mountains, Arizona
11. Casa Del Eco Mesa, Utah
12. Checkerboard Reservation, New Mexico
13. Chinle, Arizona
14. Chuska Mountains in New Mexico and Arizona
15. Cortez, Colorado
16. El Diente Peak, Colorado
17. Farmington, New Mexico
18. Flagstaff, Arizona
19. Gallup, New Mexico
20. Ganado, Arizona
21. Grand Canyon
22. Hesperus Peak, Colorado
23. Hogback, New Mexico
24. Jicarilla Apache Reservation, New Mexico
25. Keams Canyon, Arizona
26. La Plata Mountains in Colorado
27. Little Shiprock Wash, New Mexico
28. Lizard Head Peak, Colorado
29. Lukachukai, Arizona
30. Mancos, Colorado
31. Mesa Verde region in Colorado and New Mexico
32. Morgan Lake, New Mexico
33. Mount Taylor (New Mexico)
34. Navajo National Monument in Arizona
35. Popping Rock, New Mexico
36. Rattlesnake, New Mexico
37. Red Rock, Apache County, Arizona
38. Red Rock Trading Post, Arizona
39. Red Wash, New Mexico and Arizona
40. Rol Hai Rock, New Mexico
41. St. Michaels, Arizona
42. Salt Creek Wash, New Mexico
43. San Juan Mountains in Colorado
44. San Juan River (Colorado River tributary) in Colorado, New Mexico and Utah
45. Shiprock, New Mexico
46. Sleeping Ute Mountain, Colorado
47. Sweetwater, Pima County, Arizona
48. Sweetwater Trading Post, Arizona
49. Table Mesa, New Mexico
50. Teec Nos Pos, Arizona
51. Tuba City, Arizona
52. Two Grey Hills, New Mexico
53. Upper Wheatfields, Arizona
54. Wasatch Mountains, Utah
55. Whitehorse (Lake), New Mexico
56. White House Ruin, Arizona
57. Window Rock, Arizona

== Reception ==
Gary Dretzka writing in the Chicago Tribune finds Hillerman back in top form. He says that "After a bit of a lull in the series, The Fallen Man finds Hillerman back in top form. The reappearance of Leaphorn seems less a contrivance than a godsend, as Chee is challenged to demonstrate his mettle under fire, and several interesting auxiliary characters are given room to blossom."

== Publication history ==
This novel was published in English and in sixteen other languages.

== Sources ==
- Linford, Laurance D. (2011). "Index of Places by Hillerman Title". Tony Hillerman's Navajoland: Hideouts, Haunts, and Havens in the Joe Leaphorn and Jim Chee Mysteries. University of Utah Press. ISBN 978-1-60781-988-2 – via Project MUSE.
