= Navajo Nation Police =

Law enforcement agency of the Navajo Nation

Agency overview
- Formed: 1872
- Employees: 549

Jurisdictional structure
- Operations jurisdiction: USA
- Map of Navajo Nation Police's jurisdiction
- Area: 27,000 square miles (70,000 km^{2})
- General nature: Local civilian police

Operational structure
- Headquarters: Window Rock, Arizona
- Police Officers: 210
- Civilians: 279
- Agency executive: Ronald Silversmith, Chief of Police

Website
- https://npd.navajo-nsn.gov/

The Navajo Nation Police (formerly known as the Navajo Tribal Police) is the law enforcement agency on the Navajo Nation in the Southwestern United States. It is under the Navajo Division of Public Safety. It is headed by a Chief of Police, six Police Captains and eight Police Lieutenants. It includes: Internal Affairs, Patrol, K-9 Unit, Police diving, Tactical Operations Team, Traffic Unit, Fiscal management, Recruitment, and Training Divisions. The Navajo Nation Police are responsible for seven districts: Chinle, Crownpoint, Dilkon, Kayenta, Shiprock, Tuba City, and Window Rock. There are also several substations in each district ranging from one-man substations or up to five officers each. Currently, there are 210 sworn police officers (134 patrol), 28 criminal investigators, and 279 civilians acting as support staff for the department. There are approximately 1.9 police officers per 1,000 people and one officer is responsible for patrolling 70 square miles (180 km^{2}) of reservation land. The Navajo Nation Police are funded by federal contracts and grants and general Navajo Nation funds. This police department used to be one of only two large Native American police Departments with more than 100 sworn officers in the United States (the other is the Oglala Lakota Nation's police department). Now there are several Nations and Tribes that have over 100.

== History ==
The Navajo Treaty of 1868, which released Navajos from captivity at Fort Sumner, established law enforcement as the responsibility of the federal government. The first Navajo police force was created in 1872 and dissolved three years later. Although there were police on the reservation, they were funded and supported by the United States government. Policing in the Navajo Nation was operated directly by the Bureau of Indian Affairs from the late 19th century until 1959, when it established its own tribal police force. While the force was and remains largely funded by the federal government, the force has operated on its own since 1959. The Navajo Nation police is responsible for law enforcement and for the care and custody of prisoners.

== Equipment and vehicles ==
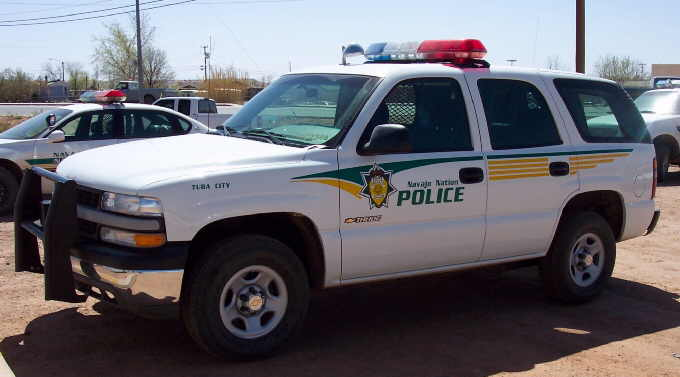

All officers are issued a service Glock 22 40 caliber sidearm, expandable baton, handcuffs, bullet-resistant vest, pepper spray and portable radio linked to a central dispatch. Rural substation officers are issued take-home vehicles, a shotgun, metal spike strips and speed radar guns. There are 200 vehicles in the Police department's fleet ranging from sport utility vehicles (SUV) such as: Chevrolet Tahoe, Chevrolet Blazer, Chevrolet Suburban and Jeep Liberty to Sedans: Chevrolet Impala. There are Kawasaki Kz1000s for motor units, 4-Wheel all-terrain vehicles (ATV) for special events/crowd control, and street bicycle units. All patrol vehicles are currently outfitted with laptop computer technology working with local Wi-Fi internet connection to assist officers to write and file reports electronically. The department recently obtained a mobile command post vehicle which is assigned to the Shiprock district located in Shiprock, New Mexico.

In 2018 chief of police Phillip Francisco restarted the Navajo Nation police academy, using the former Chinle jail as a training headquarters. Twelve new recruits graduated in June 2018, the first in-house graduates in ten years.

== Ranks ==
Rank	Chief of Police	Deputy Chief	Captain	Lieutenant	Sergeant	Police officer
Insignia						No insignia

== Fallen officers ==
As of February 2025, since the establishment of the Navajo Nation police department, seventeen officers have died in the line of duty.

== Fictional portrayals ==
Officers of the Navajo Nation police are the subjects of a series of mystery novels by Tony Hillerman. The novels deal primarily with fictional officers named Joe Leaphorn, Jim Chee, and Bernadette Manuelito. After Tony Hillerman's death in 2008, daughter Anne Hillerman has continued the mystery series.

The Hillerman novels and characters were used in a 2002 PBS television series Skinwalkers: The Navajo Mysteries and later in the AMC series Dark Winds in 2022.
