= Skeleton Man (novel) =

2004 novel by Tony Hillerman

- First edition cover
- Author: Tony Hillerman
- Cover artist: Peter Thorpe
- Language: English
- Series: Joe Leaphorn/Jim Chee Navajo Tribal Police Series
- Genre: Detective fiction
- Set in: Navajo Nation and Hopi Reservation in Southwestern United States
- Published: 2004 HarperCollins
- Publication place: USA
- Media type: Print and audio
- Pages: 241
- ISBN: 0-06-056344-3
- OCLC: 54882013
- Preceded by: The Sinister Pig (2003)
- Followed by: The Shape Shifter (2006)

Skeleton Man is a crime novel by American writer Tony Hillerman, the seventeenth in the Joe Leaphorn/Jim Chee Navajo Tribal Police series, first published in 2004. It was a New York Times best-seller

A spectacular crash of two planes above the Grand Canyon in the 1950s killed all aboard, and filled the Canyon with everything that had once been on the two planes. The event alters long held stories of the tribes who live on the Canyon floor, and leaves a pregnant woman about to be married on her own, when her fiancé's family rejects her and her child. The child is grown, and seeks her father's remains, while the lawyer who gained financially by rejection of the child fights to hold on to his wealth. A couple of expensive diamonds bring Leaphorn, Chee and Manuelito into her story, where greed is contested against family support in the grandeur of the canyon.

== Plot summary ==
When two passenger airplanes collide over the Grand Canyon in the 1950s killing all aboard, John Clarke's body is lost, as is the briefcase of diamonds he had locked to his wrist. Scorning Mr. Clarke's pregnant fiancée, the Clarke family disclaims the out-of-wedlock daughter, Joanna Craig. When Clarke's father dies without heir shortly after the crash, the family fortune is entrusted to the estate's attorney, Dan Plymale, to create a charitable foundation. Mr. Plymale then proceeds to live well as executor of the foundation's funds, while Joanna Craig and her mother make their own way.

Decades later, Billy Tuve, a Hopi, is arrested on suspicion of burglary and murder based on his presenting a rare diamond for pawn. Tuve's cousin, Cowboy Dashee solicits help from his friend Navajo Tribal Police Sergeant Jim Chee to clear Tuve's name. Retired Lieutenant Joe Leaphorn recalls that his old acquaintance Shorty McGinnis acquired a similar diamond many years ago from a man whose story matches Tuve's story. Then Louisa Bourebonette relates the stories she has heard from older Havasupais about the man with the diamonds living at the bottom of the Grand Canyon, and the flyers from a woman seeking her father's remains from that plane crash, which Leaphorn shares with Chee. Joanna Craig pays the bail for Billy Tuve, asking him to lead her to the place where he received the diamond. Though it will aid his case, Billy is reluctant because the place, the Salt Shrine, is sacred to his religion. Before Joanna can pick Billy up at his own home, Fred Sherman takes Billy away. Joanna trails them, and in a quick maneuver, takes Sherman's gun from him and shoots him in the chest. She and Billy proceed to the trail head on the south rim of the Grand Canyon. Billy takes her part way down, then disappears. Bradford Chandler, hired by Dan Plymale, learns Sherman will not meet him when a police officer answers Sherman's cell phone. Chandler goes on alone, arriving near the sacred spot. Chee, Dashee, and Bernadette Manuelito arrived earlier, looking both for the absent Billy and the man who long ago traded with Billy, a hermit wanting people to believe more in Massau’u, to resolve their feelings after the plane crash, with bodies raining down on them. Manuelito stays behind while Chee and Dashee each go a different way along the canyon bottom. She does not stay in one place, but walks and finds the slot (a cave but with an opening to sunlight way above) along the canyon wall where the man had lived, and his body, long dead of natural causes. She sees a human arm bone, and his array of the 70 remaining diamonds. She finds what Chee and Dashee sought.

Chandler, with his loaded pistol, meets Joanna in the canyon bottom. An uneasy pair, they follow Manuelito's tracks into the slot, where she is ready for the murderous Chandler. Chandler stores the seventy odd diamonds in his hiking socks. A "male" storm, one of high intensity rains, rises. Manuelito and Joanna Craig take shelter on a ledge, while Chandler leaves with his diamonds and is then carried out by the force of the instant river made by the rain. Chee finds the slot in time to see the corpse carried out by the torrent of water, followed by Chandler. He tries to save Chandler, but Chandler will not let go of the socks full of diamonds. The storm passes, and Chee runs to Manuelito. The three meet Dashee, whose ankle is injured, and return in the rescue helicopter. Joanna Craig has what she needed most, the remains of her father's arm, once chained to the container of diamonds. New DNA analysis methods show positively that he was her father, and she claims her true name of Clarke. She now has the basis to sue Plymale for her inheritance. Sherman was found in time by the local police, and survives. He will not admit that petite Joanna Craig shot him; instead he tells police he did it himself by accident. The two corpses were found, but not the diamonds, save for the one taken by Bernadette as evidence in favor of Billy Tuve. Billy Tuve is proved innocent of theft and murder.

== Characters ==
- Joe Leaphorn: Retired lieutenant from the Navajo Tribal Police, widowed for ten years. He lives in Window Rock, Arizona.
- Jim Chee: Sergeant in the Navajo Tribal Police who once worked for Leaphorn. He lives in Shiprock, New Mexico.
- Bernadette Manuelito: Recently a federal Customs Patrol Officer, and previously an officer with the Navajo Tribal Police. She is engaged to Jim Chee. Introduced in The Fallen Man.
- Pinto: Captain in the Navajo Tribal Police who calls Leaphorn in for aid on a current case that has similarity to an old case. Pinto's office is the one Leaphorn occupied for so long in his career at the Window Rock offices of the NTP.
- Albert Cowboy Dashee: Hopi man, a long time friend of Jim Chee. Introduced in The Dark Wind.
- John "Shorty" McGinnis: Owner of the Short Mountain Trading Post near Tuba City. Introduced in Listening Woman.
- Reno: Man in his thirties, long ago, who received a diamond in a snuff tin at the bottom of the Grand Canyon from an Indian living there in trade for his knife and directions out, who later traded the diamond and his horse to McGinnis for a meal and a ride to a town with a phone in a heavy snowstorm. Back then, they assumed it was zircon.
- Louisa Bourebonette: Professor of cultural anthropology with a special interest in origin stories of the tribes around Northern Arizona University. She is Leaphorn's close friend, who uses Leaphorn's spare room as the base for her dispersed interviews. Introduced in Coyote Waits.
- Billy Tuve: Hopi cousin of Cowboy Dashee, member of the Bear Clan. He is charged with theft and murder of a jewelry store owner, because of his ill-timed action of bringing an expensive jewel in for pawn.
- Bradford Chandler: Skiptracer of dubious morals hired by Plymale to locate the diamonds and John Clarke's remains, also called Jim Belshaw.
- Dan Plymale: Attorney for the Clarke family and executor of the senior Clarke's will; now running the charity that received the family fortune when the son's heir was not recognized.
- Fred Sherman: Retired policeman hired by Chandler to assist in the search for the missing diamonds.
- Hal Simmons: Ms. Craig's attorney in her search for her father's remains and claim of her birthright.
- Joanna Craig: Grown daughter of John Clarke.
- Mary: Older Hopi woman who meets Manuelito at the bottom of the Grand Canyon, giving her water and useful information.

== Title ==
Skeleton man is an alternative name for the Hopi Death kachina, Massau'u. It is also what Chee said to describe the corpse of the shaman as it passed by him in the torrent of water from the slot that had been the shaman's home when alive. Joanna Craig sought the bones of her father, both to properly bury him and to show she was his daughter, using the DNA still present, nearly 50 years later.

== Continuity ==
In conversations among the characters, references are made to stories in earlier novels. For example, Leaphorn and Shorty McGinnis make passing mention of Tso and the singer Margaret Cigaret, who were in the novel Listening Woman. Jim Chee and Bernadette Manuelito were engaged to marry at the end of the prior novel, The Sinister Pig, and they now make the final plans to marry. Chee recalls the two women he knew and loved before he fell in love with Bernadette Manuelito: Mary Landon (introduced in People of Darkness) and Janet Pete (introduced in Skinwalkers) who each pursued Chee, but would not consider living on the reservation for him. Bernadette Manuelito recalls the story told her of the way Chee handled the driver who made amends after killing a man while driving drunk, yet needed to stay out of jail to care for his grandson, part of the plot of Sacred Clowns.

== Natural, cultural and historical references ==
Geographic, botanical, animal, historical, and cultural artifacts and events often play key roles in the Chee/Leaphorn series - either as direct plot elements, to explain character motivations or perspectives, or to illustrate cultural or religious beliefs and practices. In Skeleton Man this includes:

- ANIMAL: Manuelito is delighted to encounter a Grand Canyon rattlesnake, then criticized later for being too casual about it.
- BOTANICAL: Claret cup cactus, cliff-rose, pinyon pine are Grand Canyon high-country plant life noted by Manuelito during her search; Acacia grows in canyon drainage screening the path and impeding the search.
- CULTURAL/RELIGIOUS: Billy Tuve offers to share Hopi prayer sticks with those non-Hopi who wanted to hike to the sacred site located in the search area); Havasupai is one of the peoples who live in the Grand Canyon and whom Louisa Bourebonette is interviewing for their origin stories;
- GEOGRAPHICAL: Little Colorado River at the Grand Canyon marks the path to the shrine and the old shaman; Billy Tuve is held in the jail in Gallup, New Mexico, and where Craig takes a room in the historic El Rancho hotel; the fictional Short Mountain Trading Post is noted as being north of Tuba City, Arizona; First Mesa, Arizona the location of the Tuve family home.
- GEOLOGICAL: Slot canyon is a crucial plot element.
- HISTORICAL: The 1956 Grand Canyon mid-air collision is the historical basis for the death of John Clarke.

== Reviews ==
Kirkus Reviews finds this not so much a mystery as a story of suspense as the main characters converge in the treacherous landscape of the Grand Canyon.

Bookmarks Magazine finds this novel disappointing compared to others in the series, and not enough suspense.

== See also ==
- Hopi religion
