= The First Eagle =

1998 novel by Tony Hillerman

- First edition cover
- Author: Tony Hillerman
- Cover artist: Peter Thorpe
- Language: English
- Series: Joe Leaphorn/Jim Chee Navajo Tribal Police Series
- Genre: Detective fiction
- Set in: Navajo Nation and Hopi Reservation in Southwestern United States
- Published: 1998 HarperCollins
- Publication place: USA
- Media type: Print and audio
- Pages: 278
- ISBN: 0-06-017581-8
- OCLC: 38884222
- Preceded by: The Fallen Man (1996)
- Followed by: Hunting Badger (1999)

The First Eagle is a crime novel by American writer Tony Hillerman, the thirteenth in the Joe Leaphorn/Jim Chee Navajo Tribal Police series, first published in 1998.

Acting Lieutenant Jim Chee finds one of his officers nearly dead, with the perpetrator standing next to him in Yells Back Butte. Retired Lt. Joe Leaphorn searches for a missing Health Department vector control specialist, whose job involves tracing the fleas that carry the Black Plague, and the two cases intertwine before all is resolved.

== Plot summary ==
Anderson Nez dies in the hospital of bubonic plague in a virulent new form. Dr Woody brought him in, and is now demanding details on everything that happened as Nez died in Northern Arizona Medical Center. The infected flea bit Nez the day before with a new strain of plague, at the end of June.

At Yells Back Butte near Black Mesa, Acting Lieutenant Jim Chee finds Officer Kinsman nearly dead, bashed in the head. Robert Jano, a Hopi man, stands close by, with blood on him, and an eagle in a cage. Chee arrests Jano for murdering the police officer. Jano protests his innocence. Kinsman dies in the hospital. Jano is assigned an attorney from the Department of Justice, as the charge carries the death penalty. Attorney Janet Pete is back in Phoenix; she is given his case. She believes he is innocent. Mrs. Vanders hires Joe Leaphorn to find her niece, Catherine Pollard. She has not returned from her work as a vector control specialist, a flea catcher, nor left any word of her plans, since early July. Mrs. Vanders thinks graduate student Victor Hammer might be the problem.

Leaphorn receives Pollard's field work notes, which Louisa Bourebonette reads. Pollard's job is to track down the source of the fleas with bubonic plague, and then to destroy them or the “reservoir” of small rodents that harbor those fleas. She is still pursuing the source for Nez's infection, and realizes someone has lied to her. Leaphorn realizes that Pollard was last seen on the same day that the officer was attacked, July 8. Chee is firm that Jano is guilty. Cowboy Dashee, a good friend of Chee, thinks Chee is wrong. Dashee talks to Leaphorn with an alternate theory of the case, that Pollard is the killer, perhaps in self-defense, as Dashee learned she was there that same day. Leaphorn presents the idea to Chee. Chee works on finding Pollard's black jeep. First evidence is a boy trying to sell the radio from that vehicle. Chee and Officer Manuelito visit the boy. Manuelito tells him of the reward from Mrs. Vander for finding the vehicle, and the boy leads them to the jeep. Pollard is not in it, but her field gear is, except for her Positive Air Purifying Respirator (PAPR) suit. The spacesuit-like garment is used to keep her safe from airborne infections or toxins in the field. Chee listens to Jano's story of what happened before Chee arrived on the scene, learning about the first eagle that Jano tried to catch, but let go, because it was not fit for the religious ceremony. That eagle scratched him, and that is why the eagle he put in the cage shows no blood on it. Chee visits his grand uncle Hosteen Frank Sam Nakai for advice. Chee gets the advice on catching the first eagle and learns that his uncle is dying from lung cancer. Chee proceeds to Jano's first hunting blind and catches the first eagle. He calls the FBI agent in charge to collect the eagle in support of Jano. The agent refuses, so Chee begins recording the call. He tells Janet Pete he has the eagle and of the call, and that he taped it.

Chee and Leaphorn meet Old Lady Notah who tells them all the people present at Yells Back Butte on July 8, not by name but by description, including one in the PAPR garment. Krause tells them that only one shovel is usual in Pollard's jeep, and two were found. At the death hogan, they find Pollard buried in her PAPR garment. They reach Dr. Woody's travelling lab, to find him very ill and irritable. He confesses to both murders as an unimportant detail. He wants his research passed on to a colleague. He killed Pollard because she was about to kill the prairie dog colony infected with the new strain of bubonic plague, and killed Kinsman because he saw Woody burying Pollard. Chee and Leaphorn drive Woody to meet an ambulance. Chee calls the FBI to report Woody's confession, to remove the charge from Jano. Leaphorn asks if Chee would accept the permanent Lieutenant position; he says no. Probably Chee made that choice before he recorded that phone conversation. Chee thanks Leaphorn for his help and Leaphorn enjoys working with Chee again. Chee calls Janet Pete, who meets him in Tuba City. She had two ways to use the information Chee gave her about the FBI's refusal to test the first eagle, and she chose the one that was least risk to her, and most likely to hurt Chee professionally. Their love is not strong enough to overcome their differences, and the pain of losing her will hurt tremendously.

== Characters ==
- Joe Leaphorn: Lieutenant from the Navajo Tribal Police for the last year, widowed. He lives in Window Rock.
- Jim Chee: Acting Lieutenant in the Navajo Tribal Police, recently transferred to the Tuba City office.
- Anderson Nez: Navajo man who dies of bubonic plague faster than doctors can believe. He is an assistant to Dr. Woody in his research on infectious diseases.
- Dr. Albert Woody: Researcher in infectious diseases, including bubonic plague. He is single-minded in his work. He risks spread of the disease and murders two who get in his way.
- Shirley Akheah: Nurse at Northern Arizona Medical Center who aids in Nez's treatment and later tells Leaphorn all she heard when Dr. Woody was at the hospital to bring Nez there and to seek data when Nez died.
- Robert Jano: A young Hopi man from Second Mesa who caught one eagle, let it go, caught a second one when police arrived.
- Benjamin Kinsman: Officer in Navajo Tribal Police seeking Hopi man on Navajo lands in pursuit of eagle feathers for religious ceremony, called for back-up, found mortally injured by Chee.
- Catherine Ann Pollard: She works for the Arizona Health Department and Indian Health Service as a vector control specialist, trapping fleas and small mammals for presence of bubonic plague bacteria in Arizona. She did not return from work nor return her vehicle.
- Mrs. Millicent Vanders: Elderly aunt of Cathy Pollard who seeks help from Leaphorn in finding her.
- Janet Pete: Lawyer in federal Department of Justice. She is half Navajo and grew up in the cities of the East Coast. She returns to work in the Four Corners area after being home in Washington DC. She had been engaged to Chee. She is assigned to defend Jano. She was introduced in Skinwalkers.
- Mr. Peabody: Attorney in Peabody, Snell and Glick for Mrs. Vanders, who contacts Leaphorn.
- J. D. Mickey: Acting Assistant US attorney, the federal prosecutor on Jano case who also wants to run for office.
- Edgar Evans: FBI agent new to the area.
- Louisa Bourebonette: Professor of cultural anthropology, friend of Leaphorn, who was introduced in Coyote Waits.
- John Raynold: FBI agent in charge who refuses to test the first eagle for presence of Jano's blood.
- Bernadette (Bernie) Manuelito: Young officer recently transferred to Tuba City office of Navajo Tribal Police, introduced in The Fallen Man.
- Richard Krause: Boss of Cathy Pollard, and a biologist.
- Victor Hammer: Graduate student at Arizona State University in Tempe from Germany studying vertebrate biology with interest in the spread of and survival from bubonic plague and Hanta virus. He is friends with Cathy Pollard and has run up against Dr. Woody in the field.
- Albert "Cowboy" Dashee: Hopi man, friend of Chee, and Deputy Sheriff in Coconino County. He was introduced in The Dark Wind.
- John “Shorty” McGinnis: He runs Short Mountain Trading Post, long time contact for Leaphorn about local skinwalker gossip, introduced in Listening Woman.
- Hosteen Frank Sam Nakai: Hatalii and grand uncle to Chee, who is dying from lung cancer. He was also in Sacred Clowns.
- Old Lady Notah: Grazes her goats at Yells Back Butte, was nearby on the day of the murders. She tells McGinnis that she saw a skinwalker.
- Jay Kennedy: FBI agent about to retire, who calls Leaphorn for information on an old case the night before the current case is solved, and tells him the story of the Bureau's refusal to accept evidence and Chee's taped phone call. He was introduced in Skinwalkers.

== Theme ==
The plot revolves around death and saving people from death. Jano faces a death penalty once Chee arrests him for killing his officer, rather than simply capturing a protected species of eagle. Chee retreats from his firm stance on Janos's guilt, finds new evidence and the confessed killer, and Jano is saved from death under the law. Dr. Woody researches how certain small mammals resist the bubonic plague, thus becoming reservoirs of the infection, keeping the disease among humans. He wants to save humanity from this disease. He finds a form that is more virulent than past strains that may lead to a vaccine instead of reliance on antibiotic medications. He murders people he perceives as blocking his research, and in turn is killed by the bacteria he is researching.

== Allusions to real events and places ==
The story takes place primarily on the Navajo Reservation in Arizona. Tuba City, Window Rock, Arizona, Phoenix, and Flagstaff are real places there. Chee resides in Shiprock, New Mexico, part of the Reservation. The specific location of the murders is called Yells Back Butte near Black Mesa.

Part of the plot revolves around the bubonic plague, a disease with a terrible history in Europe in the Middle Ages when it was called the Black Death and worldwide in the 19th century. The disease is still present in Arizona, Utah, Colorado, New Mexico and California in the United States.

Jano was found on lands that had been shared by Hopi and Navajo peoples, but a federal law had placed the area within the borders of the Navajo Nation. These are the Joint Use lands with both Navajo and Hopi making use of the land. This is a long-standing dispute. The 1974 public law and following court cases assigning one large area for the Hopi, requiring thousands of Navajos to move, did not resolve the issue. Although the situation was in some sense settled by a 1996 law, the issues continue to this day. The Hopi have lived in this large area for thousands of years, arriving before the Navajo. Further, the people of each tribe have different patterns of settlement (Navajo are dispersed over larger amount of land, originally from their occupation as sheepherders, while the Hopi are generally settled in villages, raise corn, make art and jewelry). Thus it is logical that a young Hopi man would seek a golden eagle there, though not strictly legal.

== Sources ==
- Linford, Laurance D. (2011). "Index of Places by Hillerman Title". Tony Hillerman's Navajoland: Hideouts, Haunts, and Havens in the Joe Leaphorn and Jim Chee Mysteries. University of Utah Press. ISBN 978-1-60781-988-2 – via Project MUSE.
