= Dark Winds =

American western thriller TV series by Graham Roland

- Genre: Psychological thriller; Western noir thriller; Crime drama
- Created by: Graham Roland
- Based on: Leaphorn & Chee by Tony Hillerman
- Showrunners: Vince Calandra (season 1); John Wirth
- Starring: Zahn McClarnon; Kiowa Gordon; Jessica Matten; Deanna Allison; Rainn Wilson; Elva Guerra; Jeremiah Bitsui; Eugene Brave Rock; Noah Emmerich; Nicholas Logan; Isabel Deroy-Olson; Franka Potente
- Country of origin: United States
- Original languages: English; Navajo
- No. of seasons: 4
- No. of episodes: 28

Production
- Executive producers: Graham Roland; Zahn McClarnon; George R. R. Martin; Robert Redford; Anne Hillerman; Tina Elmo; Vince Gerardis; Vince Calandra; Chris Eyre; John Wirth; Max Hurwitz; Thomas Brady; Jim Chory
- Production location: New Mexico
- Running time: 39–53 minutes
- Production companies: Rolling Cactus Inc.; Eleventh Northwest; Startling Television; Tina Elmo Productions; Fevre River Packet Co.; Wildwood Enterprises; AMC Studios

Original release
- Network: AMC
- Release: June 12, 2022 – present

Dark Winds is an American psychological thriller television series created by Graham Roland, based on the Leaphorn & Chee series of police procedural novels written by Tony Hillerman. It premiered on AMC on June 12, 2022.

The series stars Zahn McClarnon as Joe Leaphorn, Kiowa Gordon as Jim Chee, and Jessica Matten as Bernadette Manuelito, all of whom are Navajo Tribal Police officers. Most of the cast are Native American. Executive producers include Roland, McClarnon, George R. R. Martin, and Robert Redford. The series is Redford's third time adapting Hillerman's novels, after the films The Dark Wind (1991) and Skinwalkers (2002). The Dark Winds series is also Redford's final work, both behind the scenes and as an actor, with a small cameo role in a 2025 episode being his final on-screen performance.

The series has received very positive reviews, with particular praise for McClarnon's performance. The second season premiered on July 30, 2023, the third season premiered on March 9, 2025, and the fourth season premiered on February 15, 2026. In February 2026, ahead of the fourth-season premiere, the series was renewed for a fifth season that is set to premiere in 2027.

== Premise ==
The series follows three Navajo Tribal Police officers, Joe Leaphorn, Jim Chee, and Bernadette Manuelito in the 1970s Four Corners area of the American Southwest.

== Cast and characters ==
=== Main ===
- Zahn McClarnon as Joe Leaphorn, a veteran tribal police lieutenant based in Kayenta, a town in Navajo County
- Kiowa Gordon as Jim Chee, an undercover FBI agent who becomes Leaphorn's newest deputy
- Jessica Matten as Bernadette Manuelito, a Navajo tribal police sergeant who works closely with Leaphorn
- Deanna Allison (Note: Allison is a Navajo member of the Colorado River Indian Tribes) as Emma Leaphorn, Leaphorn's wife and a nurse
- Rainn Wilson as Dan "Devoted Dan" DeMarco (season 1), a degenerate missionary and used-car dealer who relies on his faith to recruit followers
- Elva Guerra (Note: Guerra is a member of the Ponca Tribe of Indians of Oklahoma) as Sally Growing Thunder (seasons 1–2), a pregnant teenager who is taken in by the Leaphorns
- Jeremiah Bitsui as James Tso / Hoski (season 1), member of the Buffalo Society, an extremist group, masquerading as a priest
- Eugene Brave Rock as Frank Nakai (season 1), a Vietnam War veteran and member of the Buffalo Society, an extremist group
- Noah Emmerich as Leland Whitover (season 1), a burned-out FBI agent and Chee's handler whose career is fading
- Nicholas Logan as Colton Wolf (season 2), a twisted assassin with a secret that puts him on a collision course with Leaphorn
- Isabel Deroy-Olson as Billie Tsosie (season 4), a runaway teenager seeking to reunite with her estranged family
- Franka Potente as Irene Vaggan (season 4), a German contract killer hired to hunt down Billie
- Paola Núñez as Luisa Alvarado (season 5)
- Martin Sensmeier as Terry Bai (season 5)
- John Hoogenakker as Sheriff Mark Bishop (season 5)

=== Recurring ===
- Jonathan Adams as Lester (season 1)
- Ryan Begay as Guy Atcitty (season 1; guest seasons 2–4)
- DezBaa' as Helen Atcitty (seasons 1–2; guest seasons 3–4)
- Amelia Rico as Ada Growing Thunder (season 1)
- Rob Tepper as Pete Samuels (season 1)
- Betty Ann Tsosie as Margaret Cigaret (season 1; guest seasons 2–4)
- Quenton Yazzie as Raymond Begay (season 1)
- Ryffin Phoenix as Wanda McGinnis (season 1)
- Natalie Benally as Officer Natalie Bluehouse
- John Diehl as B.J. Vines (season 2; guest season 1)
- A Martinez as Sheriff Lawrence "Gordo" Sena (seasons 2–3; guest seasons 4–5)
- Jacqueline Byers as Mary Landon (season 2)
- Jeri Ryan as Rosemary Vines (season 2; guest season 3)
- Andersen Kee as Officer Harold Bigman (season 2–present)
- Wade Adakai as Officer Gary Felix (season 2–present)
- Ernest David Tsosie as Roger (season 2; guest seasons 3–4)
- Tonantzin Carmelo as Border Patrol Agent Eleanda Garza (season 3)
- Alex Meraz as Border Patrol Agent Ivan Muños (season 3)
- Terry Serpico as Border Patrol Senior Chief Ed Henry (season 3)
- Jenna Elfman as FBI Special Agent Sylvia Washington (season 3)
- Derek Hinkey as Shorty Bowlegs (season 3; guest season 4)
- Bodhi Okuma Linton as George Bowlegs (season 3; guest season 4)
- Bruce Greenwood as Tom Spenser (season 3)
- Raoul Max Trujillo as Budge Baca (season 3)
- Christopher Heyerdahl as Dr. Reynolds (season 3)
- Carly Roland as Teddi Isaacs (season 3)
- Titus Welliver as Dominic McNair (season 4)
- Chaske Spencer as Sonny Bear Heart (season 4)
- Angelina LookingGlass as Val (season 4)
- Udo Kier as Gunthar Vaggan (season 4)
- Luke Barnett as FBI Special Agent Toby Shaw (season 4)
- Geraldine Keams as Alice Benally (season 5; guest season 1)
- Noel Fisher as Michael Jorie (season 5)
- Devin Sampson-Craig as Daniel Ironwater, Jr. (season 5)
- John Patrick Jordan as Dale Hicks (season 5)
- Gregory Cruz as Ed Manuelito (season 5)

=== Guest ===
- Stafford Douglas as Phil Springer (season 1)
- Shawnee Pourier as Anna Atcitty (season 1)
- Makena Ann Hullinger as Nanobah (season 1)
- Robert I. Mesa as Tomas Charley (season 2)
- Joseph Runningfox as Henry Leaphorn (seasons 2–4)
- Sarah Luther as Joyce Leaphorn (seasons 2–4)
- Tank Jones as Deloyd Webster (season 2)
- Phil Burke as Michael Halsey (season 3)
- Casimere Jollette as Suzanne Thompson (season 3)
- Melissa Chambers as Gladine (seasons 3–4)
- Robert Knepper as the Priest (season 3)
- Avery Hale as Albert Gorman (season 4)
- Linda Hamilton as Barbara Sena (season 4)
- Forrest Goodluck as Phillip Grayson (season 4)
- Jillian Dion as Carol Begay (season 4)

Executive producers George R. R. Martin and Robert Redford make uncredited cameo appearances in the third-season premiere, as men playing chess in a cell inside the Navajo Tribal Police station. It was Redford's final role before his death in September 2025.

== Episodes ==
Season	Episodes	Originally released	
Season	Episodes	First released	Last released
1	6	June 12, 2022	July 17, 2022
2	6	July 30, 2023	September 3, 2023
3	8	March 9, 2025	April 27, 2025
4	8	February 15, 2026	April 5, 2026

=== Season 1 (2022) ===
The first season is primarily based on Listening Woman (1978), with elements from People of Darkness (1980).

No. overall	No. in season	Title	Directed by	Teleplay by	Original release date	U.S. viewers (millions)
1	1	"Monster Slayer"	Chris Eyre	Graham Roland	June 12, 2022	1.38
In Gallup, New Mexico, robbers in a helicopter rob an armored truck, killing two guards. The helicopter flies over the nearby Navajo reservation, where it is seen by an older man named Hosteen Tso. Three weeks later, Tso is found dead in a motel room along with Anna Atcitty, the granddaughter of a Medicine Woman he was visiting due to ailments. Lieutenant Joe Leaphorn of the Navajo Tribal Police investigates the murders; Tso's body is mutilated, while Anna's body is unmarked. Leaphorn has a personal history with Anna's family, which he does not disclose to his colleagues. The medicine woman is blind, and in a catatonic state since witnessing the murders. Leaphorn's wife, Emma, a nurse, convinces him to investigate the living conditions of a pregnant girl named Sally Growing Thunder, who visited her clinic. Leaphorn's deputy Bernadette Manuelito visits Sally's home but is intimidated by her mother, a witch, and convinced the woman cursed her. Leaphorn is joined by Deputy Jim Chee, who is an undercover agent for the FBI. Agent Whitover, who was responsible for planting Chee, believes the armored truck robbery was committed by a Navajo radical group called the Buffalo Society and wants Chee to use the motel killings as a cover to investigate. Leaphorn visits Tso's property, where he finds that his water supply has been contaminated – the helicopter is at the bottom of his reservoir with a dead body inside.
2	2	"The Male Rain Approaches"	Chris Eyre	Anthony Florez	June 19, 2022	0.984
Flashbacks reveal that Anna Atcitty was dating Leaphorn's son Joe Jr., who worked at an oil drilling site with her father, Guy. At a Peyote ritual, a friend who had a premonitory vision warned Guy not to go to work that day. Guy warned several others, but not Joe Jr., who was killed in an explosion at the drilling site. Lester, the trading post owner, overheard the warning and told Leaphorn about it. Leaphorn confronted Guy and the two fought. Leaphorn shot Guy in the leg as he approached with an axe. In the present, Leaphorn identifies Jim Chee as an undercover FBI agent and convinces him to work as a double agent using the FBI's resources to assist in the double homicide case. Chee has water from Tso's property tested and confirms Leaphorn's suspicion that hydraulic fluid is in the water. An autopsy report reveals that Anna was apparently "scared to death". Emma convinces Sally Growing Thunder to stay at the Leaphorns' home, believing Sally is unsafe on her family's property. The armored truck robbers are revealed to include a man posing as Tso's Catholic priest grandson. A scarred man living on the Growing Thunder property chases down and abducts a Mormon tourist family who unknowingly purchased a painting at a local gift shop where some of the money from the heist was stashed.
3	3	"K'e"	Sanford Bookstaver	Maya Rose Dittloff & Razelle Benally	June 26, 2022	1.02
Money from the robbery is funneled through Devoted Dan's car dealership. Wanda, the painter wife of gift shop owner Lester, is also part of the money laundering. Leaphorn and Chee ask Raymond Begay to dive the pond on Tso's property, looking for evidence of the helicopter. Emma invites her niece, Nanobah, to stay at the Leaphorns' home as she celebrates her Kinaaldá. Leaphorn retrieves Anna Atcitty's and Hosteen Tso's bodies when the coroner releases them. Manuelito and Chee investigate the whereabouts of the missing Mormon family. Chee shows Manuelito where he lived on the reservation before he and his mom left because of his mom's abusive boyfriend. Manuelito invites Chee to the celebration at the end of Nanobah's Kinaaldá. Sally gets scared when Father Benjamin Tso comes to thank Leaphorn for burying his grandfather and has to be taken to the hospital. While there, Sally tells Emma the scarred man, Frank Nakai, is the father of her child.
4	4	"Hooghandi"	Sanford Bookstaver	Billy Luther	July 3, 2022	0.823
Raymond finds a helmet, but is shot by Father Tso. He and Frank Nakai are revealed to be buying up land around the mine for the Buffalo Society. Leaphorn suspects all of the crimes on the reservation are related. He and Chee talk to Father Tso, who admits he has a brother who attended Catholic school. Leaphorn and Chee look through the school records and discover there are twin Tso brothers. They realize James has been impersonating Father Benjamin Tso. Leaphorn and Chee make a plan to arrest James, while James and Frank make plans to ambush them. Chee tells Agent Whitover about Frank and James, who the FBI knows as Hoski. Leaphorn invites Chee over for dinner. At dinner, Emma tells Leaphorn she wants Sally to stay with them when she gets out of the hospital. The next day, Manuelito goes to the pond looking for Raymond and hears the shoot-out between Leaphorn, Chee, James, and Frank. She helps to arrest Frank, but James escapes on Manuelito's horse. During the arrest, it is revealed that Frank and Chee had met before, which Leaphorn did not know, and Manuelito finds out Chee is an FBI agent. Chee tells Leaphorn the FBI will put in a request to have Frank transferred. Chee and Leaphorn fight.
5	5	"Ha'íínlni"	Chris Eyre	Erica Tremblay	July 10, 2022	1.07
Chee leaves the reservation, saying goodbye to Manuelito, but she remains angry with him. He tends to a stranded motorist, who clues Chee into the too-good-to-be-true deals at Devoted Dan's car lot. Chee interviews Dan, who explains he is being blackmailed to help the Buffalo Society launder money. Chee also learns Dan was previously interviewed by Whitover, but the FBI has nothing on file. Chee retrieves the file from another agent, whom Whitover had asked to destroy the file. The file reveals Whitover knew about Tso. Leaphorn interviews Frank, trying to discern Tso's location. Frank implies there is more to the accident that killed Joe Jr. than meets the eye. Leaphorn asks Guy Atcitty about the day of the accident, and learns that there may be uranium in the area. Leaphorn and Guy make amends as they each mourn their lost child. Manuelito, alone at the station, hallucinates, and awakens to find that Frank has escaped with the help of Sally's mother. She tells Leaphorn, who goes home and tells Emma to take Sally and go someplace safe because he believes Frank will come for Sally since she is carrying his child. Emma tells Leaphorn that Sally admitted that the real father of her child is Tso. Manuelito goes to Sally's home and fights with the witch. A fire starts, and Manuelito barely escapes, but the witch dies. After she dies, her curses start to lift and Wanda, who has been in a coma since a spider bit her, wakes up and starts talking about the heist. When Manuelito returns to the station, Whitover arrives, intending to take custody of Frank, and he and Manuelito set out to search for him. Leaphorn tracks Tso on foot, and arrives to see Frank tending to a fire.
6	6	"HózhóoNaasháa"	Chris Eyre	Maya Rose Dittloff	July 17, 2022	1.26
A flashback shows Whitover and Tso discussing the armored car heist, revealing Whitover was in on the robbery. Chee radios Manuelito to warn her about Whitover, speaking Diné so Whitover cannot understand. Tso and Frank make a plan to escape by using the Mormons as cover, however the father crashes while going to retrieve a van; he is spotted and rescued by Guy Atcitty. Chee confronts Whitover, who shoots and wounds Chee. Tso and Frank discover Leaphorn in their cave hideout and try to smoke him out, but Leaphorn is able to escape and disable their vehicle. Leaphorn captures the two Buffalo Society members, but is ambushed by Whitover who shoots Frank and leaves with half of the robbery money. As Whitover tries to talk his way past Chee, he is shot and killed by Guy. Leaphorn tracks Tso, but Tso commits suicide. Meanwhile, Manuelito and Chee rescue the Mormons and dynamite the cave, burying Frank's and Whitover's bodies. Three months later, the cave is excavated; Frank's body is missing, possibly still alive. Leaphorn offers Chee, who has left the FBI, a position and the two shake hands.

=== Season 2 (2023) ===
The second season is based on People of Darkness. It is set at the time of the Apollo 15 lunar mission of July‍–‍August 1971.

No. overall	No. in season	Title	Directed by	Written by	Original release date	U.S. viewers (millions)
7	1	"Na'niłkaadii (Sheep Dog)"	Chris Eyre	John Wirth & Rhiana Yazzie	July 30, 2023	N/A
8	2	"Wonders of the Unknown"	Chris Eyre	Max Hurwitz & DezBaa'	August 6, 2023	0.788
9	3	"Antigonish"	Michael Nankin	Steven Paul Judd	August 13, 2023	0.975
10	4	"The March"	Michael Nankin	Jason Gavin	August 20, 2023	1.016
11	5	"Black Hole Sun"	Billy Luther	Billy Luther & Max Hurwitz	August 27, 2023	N/A
12	6	"Hózhó náhásdlįį (Beauty Is Restored)"	Chris Eyre	Graham Roland & John Wirth	September 3, 2023	N/A

=== Season 3 (2025) ===
The third season is based on Dance Hall of the Dead (1973) and The Sinister Pig (2003).

No. overall	No. in season	Title	Directed by	Written by	Original release date	U.S. viewers (millions)
13	1	"Ye'iitsoh (Big Monster)"	Chris Eyre	John Wirth & Steven Paul Judd	March 9, 2025	0.712
14	2	"Náá'tsoh (Big Eyes)"	Michael Nankin	Rhiana Yazzie	March 16, 2025	0.833
15	3	"Ch'į́į́dii (Ghosts)"	Michael Nankin	Max Hurwitz & Billy Luther	March 23, 2025	0.646
16	4	"Chahałheeł (Darkness Falls)"	Chris Eyre	Thomas Brady & Erica Tremblay	March 30, 2025	0.617
17	5	"Tsékǫ̨' Hasą́ní (Coal Mine Canyon)"	Billy Luther	John Wirth & Steven Paul Judd	April 6, 2025	0.812
18	6	"Ábidoo'niidę́ę́ (What We Had Been Told)"	Erica Tremblay	Max Hurwitz & Billy Luther	April 13, 2025	0.691
19	7	"T'áá Áłts'íísígo (Just a Small Piece)"	Steven Paul Judd	Thomas Brady & Erica Tremblay	April 20, 2025	0.732
20	8	"Béésh Łį́į́ (Iron Horse)"	Chris Eyre	John Wirth & Steven Paul Judd	April 27, 2025	0.736

=== Season 4 (2026) ===
The fourth season is based on The Ghostway (1984).

No. overall	No. in season	Title	Directed by	Written by	Original release date	U.S. viewers (millions)
21	1	"Kǫ' Tsiitáá Álnééh (Baptism by Fire)"	Craig Zisk	John Wirth & Steven Paul Judd	February 15, 2026	0.663
22	2	"Bikéé' Doo Éédahoozįįdę́ę́góó (Toward Their Unknown Paths)"	Zahn McClarnon	Max Hurwitz & Wenonah Wilms	February 22, 2026	0.716
23	3	"Ahááldláádígíí (That Which Has Been Torn Apart)"	Chris Eyre	Thomas Brady & Erica Tremblay	March 1, 2026	N/A
24	4	"Ni' Ániidí (The New World)"	Jim Chory	John Wirth & Steven Paul Judd	March 8, 2026	0.693
25	5	"Atída'ahiilyaágíí (Those Who Harmed One Another)"	Chris Eyre	Max Hurwitz & Wenonah Wilms	March 15, 2026	0.574
26	6	"Shíká Nidanitáhą́ą́ (Those Who Were Searching for Me)"	Steven Paul Judd	Thomas Brady & Erica Tremblay	March 22, 2026	0.567
27	7	"Nániikai (We Came Back)"	Chris Eyre	Shaandiin Tome & Shandton Williams II	March 29, 2026	0.613
28	8	"Ni' Hodisxǫs (The Glittering World)"	Erica Tremblay	Max Hurwitz & Thomas Brady	April 5, 2026	0.618

== Production ==
=== Development ===
In July 2021, it was announced that AMC had greenlighted Dark Winds for a six-episode order. The series is created by Graham Roland, who executive produces with Zahn McClarnon, George R. R. Martin, Robert Redford, Tina Elmo, Vince Gerardis, Vince Calandra, and Chris Eyre. Redford previously produced four other adaptations of the Leaphorn & Chee series: The Dark Wind (1991), Skinwalkers (2002), Coyote Waits (2003), and A Thief of Time (2004). Calandra served as showrunner, and Eyre directed the pilot. The series is produced by AMC Networks and Dark Winds Productions. In May 2022, Sanford Bookstaver was announced as an additional director.

The television adaptation of Dark Winds draws directly from Tony Hillerman’s Leaphorn & Chee novels, with each season built around a specific book or combination of books. Season 1 is based on Listening Woman, while season 2 adapts People of Darkness. Season 3 blends storylines from both Dance Hall of the Dead and The Sinister Pig, with showrunner John Wirth noting that the writers created a "mash-up" to merge the two narratives into a cohesive season arc. Season 4 adapts The Ghostway and explores themes tied to the Navajo concept of ghost sickness.

In June 2022, AMC renewed the series for a six-episode second season with John Wirth replacing Calandra as showrunner. In September 2023, the series was renewed for an eight-episode third season. In February 2025, ahead of the third-season premiere, the series was renewed for an eight-episode fourth season. In February 2026, ahead of the fourth-season premiere, the series was renewed for an eight-episode fifth season.

=== Writing ===
The writers' room is all Native American. In addition to Roland, writers on the series include Anthony Florez, Maya Rose Dittloff, Razelle Benally, Billy Luther, Erica Tremblay, John Wirth, Rhiana Yazzie, Max Hurwitz, DezBaa', Steven P. Judd, and Jason Gavin.

=== Casting ===
Alongside the series announcement, Zahn McClarnon and Kiowa Gordon were cast as Joe Leaphorn and Jim Chee. In August 2021, Noah Emmerich was cast as Whitover. Jessica Matten was cast as Bernadette Manuelito. Rainn Wilson was cast as Devoted Dan in early September. In February 2022, Deanna Allison was announced as co-starring in the series as Joe's wife Emma Leaphorn, in Allison's "first major television role".

In January 2023, Nicholas Logan and Jeri Ryan were announced to have joined the cast for the second season as Colton Wolf and Rosemary Vines, respectively.

In April 2024, Jenna Elfman, Bruce Greenwood, Raoul Max Trujillo, Tonantzin Carmelo, Alex Meraz, Terry Serpico, Derek Hinkey, Phil Burke, and Christopher Heyerdahl were announced to have joined the cast for the third season.

In March 2025, Franka Potente and Chaske Spencer were announced to have joined the cast in supporting roles. In May, Isabel Deroy-Olson joined the cast as a series regular while Luke Barnett joined the cast in a recurring role. In June, Titus Welliver joined the cast in a recurring role.

In March 2026, Paola Núñez and Martin Sensmeier were announced to have joined the cast as series regulars for the fifth season while Noel Fisher and Devin Sampson-Craig joined the cast in recurring roles. In May, John Patrick Jordan joined the cast in a recurring role. In June, John Hoogenakker joined the cast as a series regular, while Gregory Cruz joined the cast in a recurring role and Geraldine Keams was confirmed to reprise her role from the first season.

=== Filming ===
Filming took place in numerous locations in the Navajo Nation (Navajo: Naabeehó Diné Biyaad), which occupies portions of northeastern Arizona, northwestern New Mexico, and southeastern Utah. Filming for the first season took place in all three states, beginning on August 23, 2021, in Santa Fe, New Mexico. Location shooting in New Mexico occurred in Española, Tesuque Pueblo, Cochiti Pueblo and Abiquiú. In mid-October, the series filmed in Mexican Hat, Utah, and Arizona's Monument Valley and Kayenta. Filming was expected to wrap on November 11, 2021.

The second season began filming in November 2022 in Santa Fe and Tesuque Pueblo and wrapped in March 2023. Billy Luther, who wrote an episode of the first season, directed an episode of the second season. The fourth season began filming in March 2025, with Zahn McClarnon making his directing debut. The fifth season began filming in March 2026 and was completed in June 2026.

== Release ==
The series premiered on AMC and AMC+ on June 12, 2022. The second season premiered on July 30, 2023. The third season premiered on March 9, 2025. The fourth season premiered on February 15, 2026. The fifth season is set to premiere in 2027.

== Reception ==
=== Critical response ===
For the first season of Dark Winds, review aggregator website Rotten Tomatoes reported a 100% approval rating based on 38 reviews. The website's critical consensus reads, "Zahn McClarnon is riveting as a coiled cop in Dark Winds, a solid procedural that derives much of its texture from an underrepresented cultural milieu." Metacritic, which uses a weighted average, assigned a score of 80 out of 100 based on 19 critics, indicating "generally favorable reviews".

For the second season, Rotten Tomatoes reported a 100% approval rating based on 19 reviews. The critical consensus reads, "Dark Winds' sophomore season is just as captivating as its predecessor, with Zahn McClarnon reaffirming his indispensable gravitas as a leading man." Metacritic assigned a score of 84 out of 100 based on 9 critics, indicating "universal acclaim".

For the third season, Rotten Tomatoes reported a 100% approval rating based on 15 reviews. The critical consensus reads, "Dark Winds' third season tests Lieutenant Joe Leaphorn's resolve more than ever before, providing the outstanding Zahn McClarnon with some of his best material yet." Metacritic assigned a score of 84 out of 100 based on 11 critics, indicating "universal acclaim".

For the fourth season, Rotten Tomatoes reported a 100% approval rating based on 12 reviews. Metacritic assigned a score of 80 out of 100 based on 7 critics, indicating "universal acclaim".

The Navajo Times reported on criticism of the series for perceived stereotypical presentations of Navajo people, and the flawed delivery of dialogue in the Navajo language by non-native speakers which one source described as "indecipherable". Series director Chris Eyre responded by stating: "It's critically important to all of us that we represent the culture correctly. If there's course-correction to be made, we're happy to do that." For the second season, the series hired Navajo cultural advisor George R. Joe to help create more accurate portrayals of the Navajo culture.

=== Awards and nominations ===
In April 2023, the first episode of the first season, "Monster Slayer", was honored as an Outstanding Fictional Television Drama by the Western Heritage Awards of the National Cowboy & Western Heritage Museum.

In May 2023, Dark Winds received several Vision Awards from the National Association for Multi-ethnicity in Communications (NAMIC). It received the award for Best Drama, and for Best Performance in a Drama Series, awarded to Zahn McClarnon.
