= Skinwalkers (2002 film) =

American mystery television film

- Wes Studi and Adam Beach
- Written by: James Redford
- Directed by: Chris Eyre
- Starring: Adam Beach; Wes Studi; Michael Greyeyes; Alex Rice; Misty Upham
- Music by: BC Smith
- Country of origin: United States
- Original languages: English; Navajo

Production
- Producer: Craig McNeil
- Cinematography: Roy H. Wagner
- Editor: Cindy Mollo
- Running time: 100 minutes

Original release
- Network: PBS
- Release: November 24, 2002

Skinwalkers is a 2002 mystery television film based on the novel of the same name by Tony Hillerman, one of his series of mysteries set within contemporary Navajo life in the Southwest. It features an all-Native cast, with Adam Beach and Wes Studi playing officers Jim Chee and Joe Leaphorn, respectively. It was produced as part of the PBS Mystery! series, filmed on the Navajo reservation and directed by Chris Eyre.

Written by his son James, it was the second of executive producer Robert Redford's efforts to adapt Hillerman's novels, following the film The Dark Wind (1991), which he had been unsatisfied with, and preceding the television series Dark Winds (2022–present), which would be his final work.

The film was the highest rated program of 2002 on PBS. It is the first of three television films based on the same series of books, the other two being adaptations of A Thief of Time and Coyote Waits. It was repackaged in 2016 with the two following films as Skinwalkers: The Navajo Mysteries on Netflix.

== Plot ==
Joe Leaphorn (Wes Studi), a seasoned cop accustomed to the city ways of Phoenix, Santa Fe, and Albuquerque, has returned to the Navajo reservation. His wife Emma (Sheila Tousey) is recovering from cancer and feels rejuvenated by the landscape and people of her homeland. Leaphorn is less sure about their return. Well schooled in urban policing, he is soon confronted with a particular Navajo case: a mysterious killer who has a special antipathy for medicine men. Leaphorn works with a partner Jim Chee (Adam Beach), an FBI Academy grad who is also training to be a traditional Navajo healer.

Roman George's body is found miles from his abandoned truck and surrounded by ancient symbols etched in blood. A local archeologist holds the key to the symbols he left behind, so Chee and Leaphorn pay him a visit at a nearby Anasazi ruins. There, these partners find further clues indicating that the murderer may be a "skinwalker," a Navajo witch with the power to shape shift, or change from human to animal, move with lightning speed, and to kill with curses. Fearing that his mentor, Wilson Sam (Saginaw Grant), will be next, Chee convinces the medicine man to hide in a nearby motel.

As Chee juggles the day-to-day police work on the reservation, Leaphorn tracks down clues to the identity of the evasive criminal. More ancient symbols are found at an abandoned paint factory, where a local gang has been congregating. What do the signs mean? Who is sending these messages in blood? Could the murders be linked to the old Dinetah Paints scandal and lead poisoning in the region? Chee does not have much time to mull these questions over, before finding himself in the killer's crosshairs.

== Production ==
Executive producer was Robert Redford. His son James Redford wrote the screenplay, an adaptation of Tony Hillerman's novel of the same name. It was directed by Chris Eyre and filmed at the Navajo Reservation. (Eyre also appears in the film as a Tribal Judge.) The film is a co-production of Redford's Wildwood Enterprises, PBS, and the British television company Carlton Television.

== Ratings ==
The film had a television rating of 4.2 on its November 24, 2002 premiere, the highest rated show on PBS in 2002. It had an audience of approximately 12 million viewers.

== See also ==
- A Thief of Time
- Coyote Waits
