= To'Hajiilee Navajo Chapter =

Indian reservation in the United States

Coordinates: 35°05′09″N 107°05′07″W

To’Hajiilee (Navajo: Tó Hajiileehé) is the non-contiguous eastern exclave of the Navajo Nation

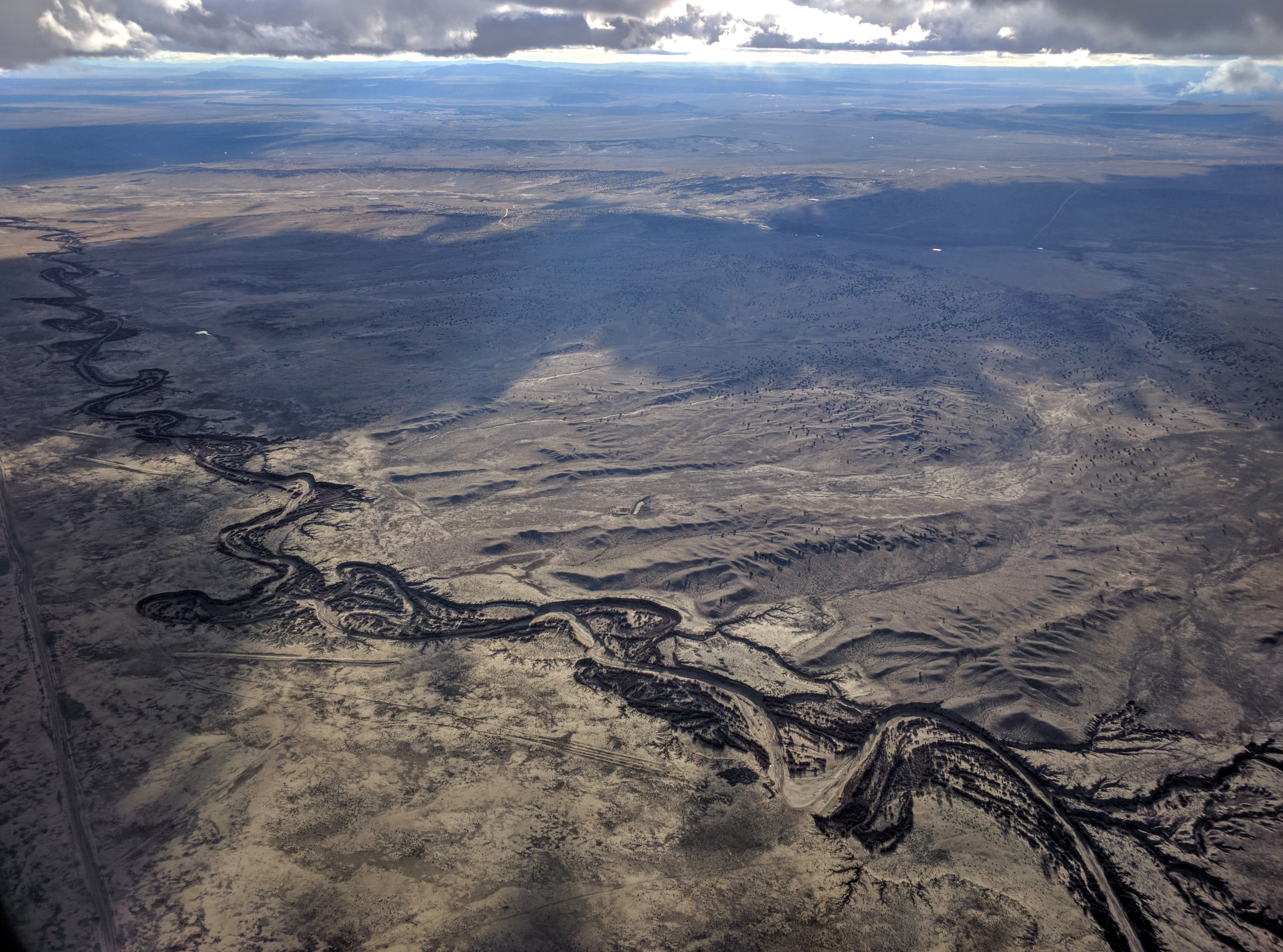
Aerial view into the To’Hajiilee where the Rio Puerco crosses its eastern boundary, just west of Albuquerque's West Mesa, Petroglyph National Monument, and Double Eagle II Airport

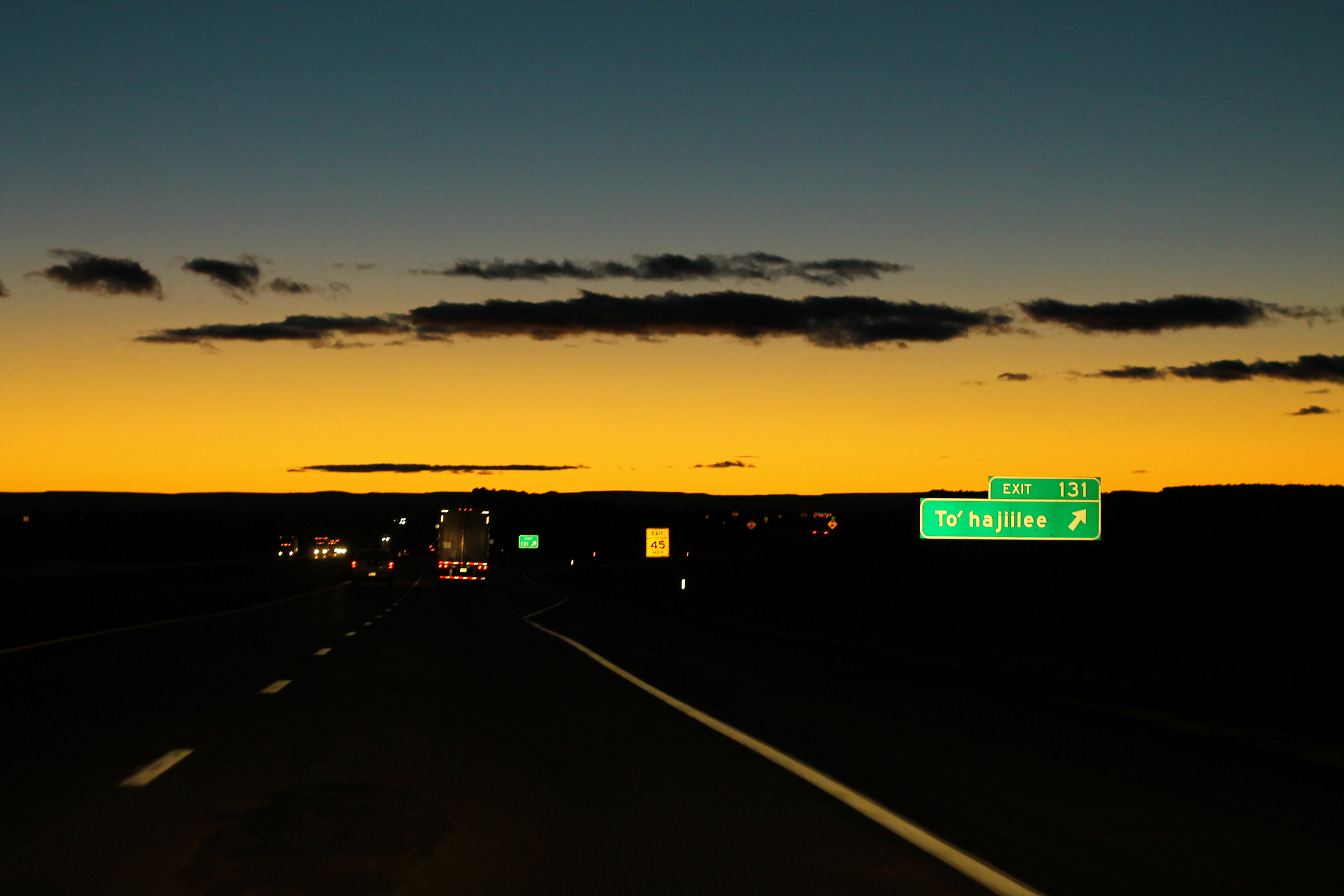
Sign for Tohajiilee on Interstate 40

The To'Hajiilee Navajo Chapter (Navajo: Tó Hajiileehé, pronounced [txʷó hɑ̀t͡ʃɪ̀ːlèːj˔é]), also spelled To'hajiilee, formerly known as the Cañoncito Band of Navajo Indians is a non-contiguous section of the Navajo Nation lying in parts of western Bernalillo, eastern Cibola, and southwestern Sandoval counties in the U.S. state of New Mexico, west of the city of Albuquerque. It is a Navajo phrase roughly translated in English as "Dipping Water."

It was formed on the "Long Walk," during the forced relocation of Navajo tribal people, in 1864. Residents there claim that people who settled there, were considered (and still are, infrequently) a renegade band who refused to go further and settled in this part of New Mexico known as the checkerboard, where both Pueblo and Navajo people share the land and live to this day.

== Description ==
It has a land area of 121.588 square miles (314.911 km^{2}) and a 2000 census population of 1,649 people. The land area is only about 0.5% of the entire Navajo Nation's total. The name comes from the Navajo phrase tó hajiileé, meaning "where people draw up water by means of a cord or rope one quantity after another."

== In popular culture ==
- The final scenes of The Ghostway novel by Tony Hillerman, published in 1984, take place in Cañoncito Reservation.
- To'Hajiilee is a recurring location on the television series Breaking Bad (2008–2013); the 13th episode of its final season, "To'hajiilee," is named after the reservation.
  - To'Hajiilee returned in Breaking Bad spin-off prequel Better Call Saul as a filming location in the episode "Bagman", depicting a fictional location near the US-Mexico border.
