= Amy Redford =

American actress (born 1970)

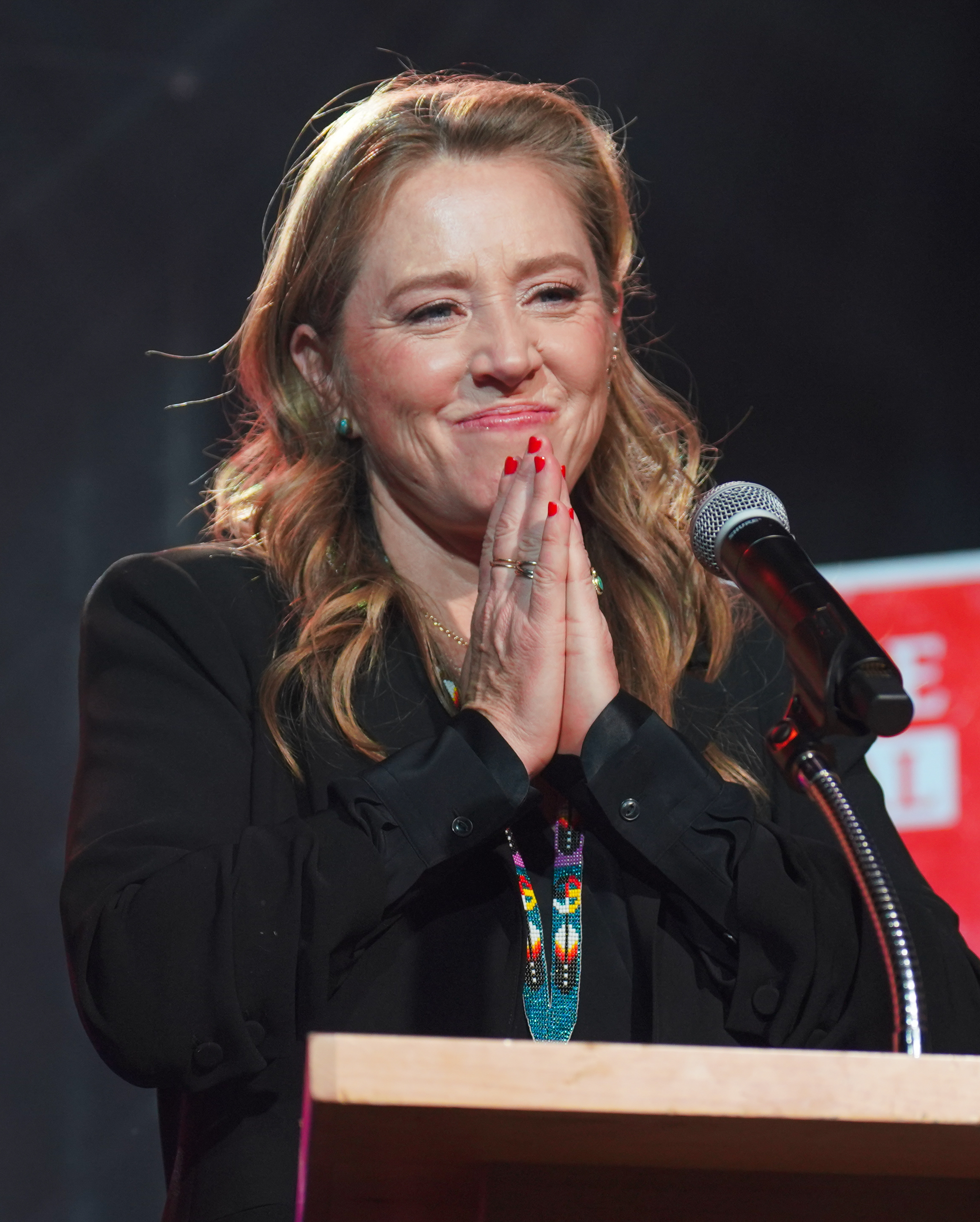
- Redford in 2026
- Born: Amy Hart Redford; October 22, 1970 (age 56)
- Education: San Francisco State University (BA)
- Occupations: Actress; director; producer
- Years active: 1999–present
- Parents: Robert Redford (father); Lola Van Wagenen (mother)
- Relatives: James Redford (brother)

Amy Hart Redford (born October 22, 1970) is an American actress, director and producer.

== Early life ==
Amy Redford's parents are historian and environmental activist Lola Van Wagenen and film director and actor Robert Redford.

She received her BA in Drama/Theatre Arts in 1994 from San Francisco State University. She also attended the University of Colorado Boulder and studied theatre in England at LAMDA.

== Career ==
She has acted in such films as Maid in Manhattan, This Revolution, Sunshine Cleaning, The Last Confederate: The Story of Robert Adams, and The Understudy, and on such television shows as Sex and the City, Law & Order: Criminal Intent, and The Sopranos. Redford directed the film The Guitar which premiered at the 2008 Sundance Film Festival. She also starred in the film When I Find the Ocean.

In 2022, Redford directed Roost, which had its world premiere at that year's Toronto International Film Festival. She also served as a producer on The Lincoln Project for Showtime, directed by Karim Amer and Fisher Stevens.
