= Lola Van Wagenen =

American historian (born 1938)

- Born: December 19, 1938 (age 87); Provo, Utah, U.S.
- Occupations: Historian; activist
- Years active: 1970–present
- Spouses: Robert Redford (m. 1958; div. 1985) George Burrill (m. 2002)
- Children: 4, including James and Amy

Lola Van Wagenen (born December 19, 1938) is an American historian and activist. In 1970, she co-founded Consumer Action Now (CAN), a non-profit educational organization.

In 1995 she co-founded Clio Visualizing History, Inc. to promote history education. (In 2003, Clio changed its corporate structure becoming a not-for-profit organization providing educational films and online history exhibits and resources.)

== Biography ==
Van Wagenen was born in Provo, Utah. She was raised in a Mormon family, but as an adult has explored other sources of religious and philosophical thought.

She met her first husband, actor Robert Redford, in Los Angeles in 1957. They were married in Las Vegas on August 9, 1958. The couple had four children, one of whom died in infancy. Redford and Van Wagenen never publicly announced a separation or divorce, but in 1982, entertainment columnist Shirley Eder reported that the pair "have been very much apart for a number of years." In 1991, Parade magazine reported "it is unclear whether the divorce has been finalized." Many websites say they were divorced in 1985.

Van Wagenen received her bachelor's degree at Vermont College in 1982 and her master's degree in public history at New York University (NYU) in 1984. Ten years later, she completed her Ph.D. in American history at NYU. Her doctoral dissertation was published in 2003 as a book, Sister-Wives and Suffragists: Polygamy and the Politics of Woman Suffrage 1870–1896. In October 2012 she received the Distinguished Alumni/Alumnae Achievement Award from the Graduate School of Arts and Sciences at NYU.

She married George Burrill, Ph.D., the founder of the international development firm ARD, on July 17, 2002, in Shelburne, Vermont. Burrill is the Honorary Consul from New Zealand to Vermont. He was a US delegate to the United States New Zealand Partnership Forum in 2011, held in Christchurch, when a devastating earthquake struck the city. After his return to Vermont, the couple organized a successful fundraiser that netted over $70,000 for earthquake recovery programs.

Van Wagenen serves on the Robertson Scholars selection committee, which grants scholarships to international students at Duke University and University of North Carolina. The couple established the New American Scholarship Fund at Champlain College in 2012.

Since the 1970s, Van Wagenen has served on the Board of Directors or in other capacities with various charitable organizations, including Shelburne Farms, the Vermont Historical Society, and the New York Women's Foundation. She served on the Task Force on Appropriate Technology with the U.S. Office of Technology Assessment in 1977. In 1979 she was a member of the National Commission on the International Year of the Child.

== Professional career ==
Van Wagenen first received public attention as the wife of actor Robert Redford. In her own right, she was an executive producer of several films, including Miss America: A Documentary Film, broadcast on the PBS series American Experience in January 2002, and The State of Marriage, released in 2015.

Her publications include the book Sister-Wives and Suffragists: Polygamy and the Politics of Woman Suffrage 1870- 1896 and the article "In Their Own Behalf: The Politicization of Mormon Women and the 1870 Franchise".

== Activism ==
In 1970, as Lola Redford, she co-founded Consumer Action Now (CAN), a not-for-profit educational organization in New York City, and served as co-chair for 10 years. The group included Ilene (Jones) Goldman (then-wife of screenwriter William Goldman), author Linda Stewart (who acted as editor and a major writer of the CAN monthly newsletter), Cynthia (Burke) Stein, author Irmgard Hunt, and a dozen other women. CAN established a variety of consumer-oriented and environmental education programs aimed at showing consumers how their buying habits affected the environment.

For more than a decade, she promoted CAN's goals through a series of public speaking engagements, including local and national television shows. In 1972, she organized the Environmental Action Forum, a gathering for consumer and environmental activists; the event was hosted by Betty Furness and featured speakers from a variety of environmental and civic organizations. Van Wagenen organized CAN's political action council, which lobbied for passage of the Toxic Substances Control Act and the Resource Conservation and Recovery Act (both passed in 1976).

The CAN Newsletter was published monthly from 1970 to 1973, covering different consumer education subjects in each issue. Van Wagenen wrote articles or conducted research for each issue and worked to expand the circulation, which reached readers nationwide.

From 1975 to 1977, Van Wagenen developed The Sun Fund as a tool for raising awareness of energy conservation and alternative energy sources. The project included the Solar Energy Slide Show, which was the basis for The Solar Film, a 1980 Academy Award Nominee for Best Live Action Short Film.

In 1978, she organized SunDay in New York, a three-day nationally televised educational and environmental celebration that began with a sunrise ceremony at the United Nations and included events sponsored by New York Institute of Technology and the U.S. Small Business Administration. Speakers at various SunDay events included Margaret Mead, Dr. Barry Commoner, Pete Seeger and Amory Lovins.

In 1979 and 1980, Van Wagenen organized the Women's Energy Education Project, coordinating with the U.S. Department of Housing and Urban Development and the U.S. Department of Energy to publish Women Tapping a New Resource for Energy, Women’s Energy Handbook, and Women’s Energy Toolkit.

In 1979, she received an Honorary Doctorate in Science from the Pratt Institute for promoting energy conservation and increased use of renewable energy resources.

== Film and website production ==
After completing her Ph.D. in American history in 1995, Van Wagenen and historian Jeanne Houck cofounded Clio Visualizing History, Inc., intending to bring American history to a broad public audience. As executive producer for the documentary film Miss America: A Documentary Film, for PBS American Experience, Van Wagenen obtained funding for the project from The National Endowment for the Humanities. However, her subsequent film projects received only partial funding or none; a film proposal called Catching the Shadow: America's First Women Photographers received a scripting grant from the NEH, but other proposals, such as The Battle of the Sexes: Billie Jean King and Bobby Riggs, were eventually shelved.

Smaller educational projects were more successful, as Clio provided research and production services for clients such as McGraw-Hill, The Asia Society and City Lore. Productions included CD-ROMs to accompany textbooks, web-based interactive materials, and an interactive kiosk.

In 2003 Jeanne Houck departed and Van Wagenen reorganized Clio's corporate structure, changing it to a not-for-profit educational organization. Research materials gathered for the film proposal Catching the Shadow: America's First Women Photographers were adapted for use in online exhibits about Frances Benjamin Johnston and Mary and Frances Allen. Clio developed an interactive online version of Gregory Pfizer's book Picturing the Past: Illustrated Histories and the American Imagination, 1840–1900, and produced "Quilts as Visual History," researched by Jennifer Reeder, then at George Mason University.

Clio's recent projects offer more videos and interactive elements. "Lowell Thomas and Lawrence of Arabia: Making a Legend, Creating History," was a collaboration between Van Wagenen and filmmaker Rick Moulton. The exhibit features archival photos, audio clips, and a short film, presenting a variety of viewpoints on journalist Lowell Thomas and military officer T. E. Lawrence. Van Wagenen's newest project for Clio's website is titled "Click! The Ongoing Feminist Revolution," a collaboration with Susan Ware, Melanie Gustafson and Marilyn Blackwell. This exhibit highlights the collective action and individual achievements of women from the 1940s to the present, and features 46 film clips (taken from 27 documentary films), extensive interactive timelines, essays and photos.

While directing her online projects, Van Wagenen also served as executive producer on two films: Lowell Thomas: The American Storyteller by Rick Moulton (in production), and The State of Marriage by Jeff Kaufman (released in 2015).
