= The Ghostway =

1984 novel by Tony Hillerman

- First edition cover
- Author: Tony Hillerman
- Cover artist: David Myers
- Language: English
- Series: Joe Leaphorn/Jim Chee Navajo Tribal Police Series
- Genre: Detective fiction
- Set in: Navajo Nation in Southwestern United States
- Published: 1984 Harper & Row
- Publication place: USA
- Media type: Print and audio
- Pages: 213
- ISBN: 0-06-015396-2
- OCLC: 10998822
- Preceded by: The Dark Wind (1982)
- Followed by: Skinwalkers (1986)

The Ghostway is a crime novel by American writer Tony Hillerman, the sixth in the Joe Leaphorn/Jim Chee Navajo Tribal Police series. It was first published in 1984 and features Jim Chee.

A gunfight at a laundromat in Shiprock, New Mexico brings Los Angeles problems to the Navajo reservation.

The novel was reviewed positively at its publication. "The tension between the Navajo way-of-life and the tempting white-world outside… is central and emphatic" in this novel. The central character "Chee is developed to greater depth than before", though that reviewer felt that the three novels featuring Leaphorn (first three in this series) were more powerful. Another called this novel choice reading. Another review found that the story "moves alertly along" and is "one of the best in the series."

== Plot summary ==
Hosteen Joseph Joe, finishing his laundry in Shiprock, New Mexico, answers questions put by a man in a new car, about Leroy Gorman. Joe does not know that man, but studies the Polaroid photo of him in front of his aluminum trailer home, set next to a cottonwood tree in fall. A second car appears, driven by Lerner, who chastises the first driver. After a gun battle, Lerner is dead on the ground. The other man drives away.

Sgt. Jim Chee finds the place where the first man drove, the hogan of Ashie Begay. With FBI agents Sharkey and Witrey, and Deputy Bales, Chee finds Albert Gorman buried near what is now a death hogan, but not the photo Joseph Joe described. Gorman was buried almost exactly following the Navajo way, save for his unwashed hair. Returning a week later, Chee encounters runaway Margaret Billy Sosi, crying for her grandfather. They talk, she slips away. Chee next finds the aluminum trailer shown in the photo, where he expects to find Leroy Gorman, but the man there is Grayson. Margaret Sosi had shown up earlier that day, looking for her grandfather. In search of Sosi and her relatives, Chee drives 900 mi to Los Angeles. He meets two city police detectives, Shaw and Wells, who know the FBI agent Upchurch who died or was killed in trying to close a nine-year case on the McNair gang, experts in high priced car thievery and the cocaine trade, who leave no witnesses.

Chee patiently speaks with Mr Berger, resident of the old people’s home near Gorman’s place. They saw Sosi visit the day before, and saw Gorman argue with a big blond man – Vaggan. Gorman showed them the photo of his brother at his trailer. Then Gorman left. They knew he stole cars for his living. With help from Shaw, Chee gets the address for Gorman’s next of kin. Chee meets Bentwoman, the grandmother of Ashie Begay. Margaret Sosi has been there and will return there after dark. Bentwoman advises Chee to enter his hogan, as he is dead but no one died in his home. Leaving, Chee encounters Vaggan and Margaret in the empty street. Chee jumps Vaggan, Vaggan beats up Chee, Margaret gets Vaggan's gun and runs the show; she makes Vaggan drive Chee to the hospital. Shaw comes to the hospital where Chee is recovering from head wounds. Chee recalls the arsenal in Eric Vaggan’s van. He realizes what Margaret did, but how? Shaw learns the new lawyer at DA office handling the McNair case is not helpful. Chee will pursue Margaret Sosi, who has left Bentwoman’s home.

During his three days in a Los Angeles hospital, Chee calls Mary Landon. He is really in love with her. He re-evaluates his choice about her and his home. Chee drives back to Shiprock, stopping at Flagstaff. The gang knew Gorman was heading for his brother. Vaggan tried to stop him, failed, so Lerner was sent to kill Gorman. He reports to Capt. Largo. Largo knows Leroy Gorman is Grayson in the Witness Protection by checking who paid for his trailer. While Chee is on sick leave, he gets a horse to find Margaret Sosi and that picture. At Begay’s hogan, Chee finds the sacred items Begay would not leave behind. He searches until he finds two dead horses, shot in the head, one still standing, covered with snow. Then he finds the rest of Begay’s property and the corpse of Begay, killed as the horses were, in the head. But he has not yet found Margaret or the elusive photo. Chee visits his uncle to learn who performs the Ghostway ceremony. He learns where the sing for Margaret is happening.

Margaret Sosi is finishing the last day of the Ghostway sing to purify her from being in the death hogan, surrounded by her clan. Jim Chee arrives at the meal break before the last part of the sing. He tells her that her grandfather is dead and then asks her what was on the postcard from her grandfather. She left it at school, but it has the words "don’t trust nobody -- Leroy" written across it. He calls Grayson/Leroy Gorman to meet his own clan at the ceremony. After Gorman arrives, Chee realizes that the real Leroy Gorman is dead and Grayson is part of the gang, maybe Beno or any Navajo in the gang – explaining why Lerner was sent to kill Albert Gorman before Albert found the aluminum trailer. The Ghostway ends at dawn; Chee leaves with Margaret. Grayson drives away, to meet Vaggan in the nearby empty old hogan. Chee and Margaret drive into an ambush on the road. While Chee is forced to the ground, Margaret shoots Vaggan with his own pistol. Beno (aka Grayson) is unarmed, gives up, and is arrested by FBI agents at the Cañoncito Reservation police station. Margaret goes back to school.

At home, Chee finds a long letter from Mary, who realizes she cannot change her Jim Chee from being a Navajo, and will go home to Wisconsin to think more about it.

== Reviews ==
Kirkus Reviews wrote that the novel has some pockets of sentimentality, but keeps the crucial features of the novel in compelling balance.

Marcia Muller writes that "While not as powerful as the Leaphorn novels, The Ghostway ties its thematic matter into the plot in an extremely satisfying way, and Chee is developed to greater depth than before. Any reader will be eager to see how he resolves his conflicts in future novels."

Alice Cromie, writing in the Chicago Tribune, likes this novel, finding it choice reading. "Neatly, Hillerman weaves a Navajo superstition into whether Chee will enter a hogan that may contain a dead Navajo`s ghost."

Newgate Callendar, writing in the New York Times, says this novel "maintains the high standard of its predecessors." In contrast with Muller's view, Callendar says this novel "moves alertly along, has all the flavor and exoticism one associates with Mr. Hillerman and is one of the best in the series."

== Television adaptation ==
The fourth season of Dark Winds is based on The Ghostway.

== Sources ==
- Linford, Laurance D. (2011). "Index of Places by Hillerman Title". Tony Hillerman's Navajoland: Hideouts, Haunts, and Havens in the Joe Leaphorn and Jim Chee Mysteries. University of Utah Press. ISBN 978-1-60781-988-2 – via Project MUSE.
