= Elva Guerra =

American actor (born 2004)

- Occupation: Actor
- Years active: 2021–present
- Known for: Reservation Dogs, Dark Winds

Elva Guerra (born 2004) is an American actor best known for their role as Jackie in Reservation Dogs (2021–2023). Other major roles have included Sally Growing Thunder in Dark Winds. They also gave voice to the lead character Anna Horn in the thriller Sisters of the Lost Nation, a book on tape written by Nick Medina.

== Early life ==
Born in Oklahoma, Guerra is of Mexican and Ponca descent. They identify as two-spirit. They were cast for their first acting role at age 16.

== Filmography ==
=== Film ===
Year	Title	Role	Notes
2022	You and Me This Summer	Regan	Short film

=== Television ===
Year	Title	Role	Notes
2021–2023	Reservation Dogs	Jackie	16 episodes
2021	Rutherford Falls	Young Charlotte Thomas	Episode: "Terry Thomas"
2022–2023	Dark Winds	Sally Growing Thunder	Main role; 12 episodes
