= American Primeval =

2025 American Western television series by Mark L. Smith and Peter Berg

- Promotional poster
- Genre: Western
- Created by: Mark L. Smith
- Written by: Mark L. Smith
- Directed by: Peter Berg
- Starring: Taylor Kitsch; Betty Gilpin; Dane DeHaan; Saura Lightfoot-Leon; Derek Hinkey; Joe Tippett; Jai Courtney; Preston Mota; Shawnee Pourier; Shea Whigham
- Theme music composer: Explosions In The Sky
- Country of origin: United States
- Original language: English
- No. of episodes: 6

Production
- Executive producers: Peter Berg; Alexander H. Gayner; Eric Newman; Mark L. Smith
- Producers: Tim King; Robin Le Chanu
- Cinematography: Jacques Jouffret
- Running time: 36–63 minutes
- Production companies: Grand Electric; Film 44

Original release
- Network: Netflix
- Release: January 9, 2025

American Primeval is an American Western miniseries created and written by Mark L. Smith and directed by Peter Berg. Starring Taylor Kitsch and Betty Gilpin, the series is set in 1857 during the Utah War. It was released on January 9, 2025, on Netflix.

== Premise ==
Set in 1857 during the Utah War, the series dramatizes the fight to gain control of the American West and the violent clash between the Church of Jesus Christ of Latter-day Saints (LDS Church) and cultures in the Utah Territory, centering on the events surrounding the Mountain Meadows Massacre. While set amid actual historical events, the series is largely fictional.

== Cast and characters ==
=== Main ===
- Taylor Kitsch as Isaac Reed/Spotted Hawk, a skilled mountain man raised by the Shoshone, haunted by the loss of his wife and son
- Betty Gilpin as Sara Holloway/Rowell, Devin's mother who is a wanted fugitive for the murder and robbery of her wealthy husband, fleeing to take her son to his father in Crooks Springs
- Dane DeHaan as Jacob Pratt, a devoted follower of the LDS Church who seeks a better life in Wyoming with his newlywed wife, Abish
- Saura Lightfoot-Leon as Abish Pratt, Jacob's wife and a profound believer in the LDS Church
- Derek Hinkey as Red Feather, a Shoshone warrior and leader of the Wolf Clan, who despises white Americans for their aggression against his people
- Joe Tippett as James Wolsey, the leader of the Mormon militia
- Jai Courtney as Virgil Cutter, a ruthless bounty hunter who leads a group of trappers to find Sara and claim the bounty on her head
- Preston Mota as Devin Rowell, Sara's sensitive young son, who has a physical disability that affects his mobility
- Shawnee Pourier as Two Moons, a mute young Indigenous woman who flees her village, seeking refuge with Sara and Devin
- Shea Whigham as Jim Bridger, the founder and leader of the Fort Bridger trading post

=== Recurring ===
- Lucas Neff as Captain Edmund Dellinger, a U.S. Army officer stationed near Fort Bridger
- Kyle Davis as Tilly, a combative member of Virgil's group
- Tokala Black Elk as Buffalo Run, a proud warrior of the Wolf Clan
- Nick Hargrove as Sammy Cottrell, Bridger's right-hand man
- Dominic Bogart as Frank Cook, a high-ranking member of Mormon militia
- Alex Fine as Gant, a loyal member of Virgil's group
- Kip Weeks as Sergeant-Major Pepper, Dellinger's second-in-command who acts as a spy for the Mormon militia
- Andrew P. Logan as Lucas Cutter, Virgil's younger brother and a local trapper
- Kim Coates as Brigham Young, the first governor of the Utah Territory and the second president of the LDS Church
- Irene Bedard as Winter Bird, Red Feather's mother, Reed's adoptive mother, and the wise matriarch of the Shoshone
- Nanabah Grace as Kuttaambo'i, a fierce female warrior of the Wolf Clan
- Alex Breaux as Wild Bill Hickman, a high-ranking member of the LDS Church
- Jeremiah Bitsui as Grey Fox, a Native American soldier serving under Dellinger
- Mosiah Aaron Crowfoot as Young Elk, Red Feather's son

== Episodes ==
No.	Title	Directed by	Written by	Original release date
1	"Episode 1"	Peter Berg	Mark L. Smith	January 9, 2025
Sara Rowell and her son, Devin, travel from St. Joseph, Missouri to Fort Bridger, Wyoming, hoping to find Devin's father. There, they learn that Beckworth, who was supposed to be their guide to Crooks Springs, has left. The route to Crooks Springs is unknown, underdeveloped, and dangerous, preventing them from reaching the remote location. Despite warnings from fort chief Jim Bridger about harsh winter conditions and regional conflicts, Sara insists on continuing the journey. After their hired guide from Missouri, Mr. Frye, is killed at the fort, Sara asks Isaac Reed, a mountain man raised among the Shoshone and familiar with the terrain, to guide them. Reed refuses to join the expedition but later secretly follows Sara and Devin out of concern for their safety. Sara joins a Mormon group led by newlyweds Jacob and Abish Pratt for safety. A bounty hunter from St. Louis reveals Sara's true identity as Sara Holloway after her departure, a fugitive wanted for murder with a $1,500 bounty. The bounty hunter is killed by Virgil's group, local trappers, seeking the reward. The group eventually rests with a caravan of 200 settlers from Arkansas. Tensions escalate when a Mormon militia claims the territory and demands that the entire group leave, unaware that some among them are Mormons. When the settlers refuse, the militia, disguised as Native Americans, ambushes them with the aid of Paiute allies. Most of the group is massacred, and women are taken as payment. Reed saves Sara and Devin. Jacob Pratt is gravely injured, and the Pratt party, along with the Arkansans, die.
2	"Episode 2"	Peter Berg	Mark L. Smith	January 9, 2025
Jacob Pratt survives the massacre; his wife Abish, however, is missing. U.S. Army Captain Edmund Dellinger, investigating the massacre, approaches Jacob for help. Jacob instead joins the Mormon militia, believing that they can help him find Abish. Meanwhile, Sara, Devin, and Two Moons, a Native American girl who fled abuse and sought refuge with the caravan, are pursued by Virgil's group, while Reed is separately hunted by Paiutes hired by the Mormon militia to eliminate survivors. The two groups eventually converge, capturing both Reed and Sara's party. However, Two Moon kills a man from Virgil's group, creating an opening for Sara and Devin to escape. Reed also evades the Paiutes, getting injured in the process. Abish, held captive by the Paiutes, is spared when Shoshone warrior Red Feather kills her captors and the other captive women. Red Feather takes Abish to his group. Reed approaches a group of white American hunters to buy horses, but they turn hostile when they recognize Sara. They try to capture them by force, and in self-defense, Reed kills the hunters, getting badly wounded in the fight. Before collapsing, he agrees to Sara's offer of $1,500 for safe passage to Crooks Springs. The group is eventually taken in by the Shoshone, where Reed encounters Dellinger, who is searching for Red Feather. As Reed recovers, the group resumes their journey toward Crooks Springs. Meanwhile, Jacob continues to follow the Mormon militia, holding onto their promise to help him find Abish.
3	"Episode 3"	Peter Berg	Mark L. Smith	January 9, 2025
The Mormon militia, aiming to conceal their involvement in the massacre, sends Jacob and Cook with a group of trappers led by Virgil to find Sara, who is traveling with an unknown woman, hoping it might be Abish, but they do so simply to remove him from the situation. Meanwhile, Brigham Young, the first governor of Utah Territory, attempts to purchase Fort Bridger from Jim Bridger, which serves as a key entry point for settlers in the Mormon-controlled region. Sara encounters a young French-speaking girl, and despite Reed's objections due to his suspicion of her sudden appearance, she decides to help. They are ambushed and captured by French-speaking bandits, with the girl acting as bait. Two Moons manages to escape before the capture, and that night, Sara is raped. Two Moons returns that night, helping Sara to escape. In a fit of rage, Sara kills the bandits but spares the little girl and her grandmother, as she runs out of bullets. Abish is brought to the main Shoshone clan after unsuccessful escape attempts. Jacob, accompanied by a member of the Mormon militia, notices him looking at a pocket watch from one of his friends, realizing the Mormons are involved in the massacre. Meanwhile, Red Feather's group kills Dellinger's scout party, increasing tensions in the area.
4	"Episode 4"	Peter Berg	Mark L. Smith	January 9, 2025
After Brigham Young fails to negotiate with Jim Bridger, the Mormons attempt to buy out Bridger's belongings at an inflated price, which offends Jim and results in Bill, a high-ranking officer under Brigham Young, being injured. Meanwhile, Abish experiences the Shoshone lifestyle and realizes their kindness. She warns Red Feather not to wage war on the white men due to his pride. Red Feather listens to her and agrees, bringing her, along with two captured army soldiers, back to Dellinger. Dellinger uses Abish to identify the Mormon militia members responsible for the massacre. However, Abish soon realizes the Mormons will stop at nothing to silence her as a witness, so she escapes back to the Shoshone, despite Dellinger's protection. Jacob, in a fit of rage, kills Cook, a Mormon militia member who had accompanied him. Mistrust then causes a group of bounty hunters to leave Jacob behind. Dellinger's second-in-command, Sergeant-Major Pepper is revealed to be a double agent working for Bill, exposing Dellinger's plans for reinforcements. Reed and Sara's party is caught in a snow blizzard deep in the mountains. Sara shows some affection toward Reed, but he rejects her, haunted by his painful past. Along the way, Devin's horse is severely injured. To prevent further suffering, Reed shoots the horse. Devin's leg is also broken in the process, and the group urgently looks for shelter.
5	"Episode 5"	Peter Berg	Mark L. Smith	January 9, 2025
The Mormon militia attacks Dellinger's camp, massacring everyone, including Pepper, a spy for the Mormon militia. Brigham Young offers Jim Bridger a much larger sum than before to buy out his fort, but Jim refuses once again. Brigham then attempts to arrest Jim for allegedly affiliating with Indians under Mormon jurisdiction, but the fort community stands against him and forces Brigham out. Abish, along with Red Feather, arrives to aid Dellinger, fearing a Mormon attack, but they only discover the bodies of U.S. Army soldiers and Dellinger. Meanwhile, in the mountains, Reed and Sara's group tend to Devin's injured leg, which has become severely infected. Sara refuses to amputate it. Reed, haunted by memories of his wife and son's deaths, agrees to help Two Moons cauterize Devin's leg to stop the infection. The procedure is successful. Local bounty hunters soon find the group, and one of them captures Sara, fleeing with her. Reed ruthlessly kills the remaining bounty hunters. Meanwhile, the Shoshone prepare for war against the Mormon militia.
6	"Episode 6"	Peter Berg	Mark L. Smith	January 9, 2025
Brigham Young makes one final offer to Jim Bridger, presenting him with two large bags full of money, far exceeding his previous offers. This time, Jim Bridger accepts the deal, agreeing to clear out his community within two days so that Brigham can burn Fort Bridger to the ground. Meanwhile, Jacob, descending into madness, is found by Bill, a high-ranking Mormon officer. Together, they launch a night attack on a Shoshone clan. During the chaotic battle, Jacob unknowingly shoots Abish, who is dressed in Shoshone attire. When Jacob finally recognizes her, he kisses her one last time before she dies in his arms. Overcome with guilt and sorrow, Jacob shoots himself to death. By dawn, the Shoshone are annihilated, including their leader, Red Feather. However, Red Feather managed to kill Wolsey, the leader of the Mormon militia, before succumbing to his wounds. With the Shoshone defeated, Brigham Young orders Fort Bridger to be burned to the ground. As the fort's residents drink themselves into a stupor amidst the blazing inferno, Jim quietly slips away. Meanwhile, Sara is captured by Virgil, the leader of the bounty hunters. Reed tracks them down, kills everyone except Virgil's brother, and rescues Sara. The two reunite with Devin and Two Moons, and the group resumes their journey toward Crooks Springs. At the edge of Crooks Springs, Reed announces that they no longer need his help and prepares to part ways. Sara, however, confesses her love for him, and they share a kiss. Unbeknownst to them, Virgil's brother has followed the group, seeking revenge. He ambushes Two Moons, Devin, and Sara, but Reed returns just in time to save them. In the ensuing fight, Reed kills Virgil's brother but is critically injured. He succumbs to his wounds shortly after. The group holds a funeral for Reed, honoring him with Shoshone traditions. Standing on the hills of Crooks Springs, Sara looks westward and decides not to stay, choosing instead to continue their journey to California, leaving Crooks Springs behind.

== Production ==
=== Development ===
The six-part series was written by Mark L. Smith and directed by Peter Berg. Berg, via Film 44, and Eric Newman, via Grand Electric, are executive producers. It was commissioned by Netflix in December 2022. Smith is also an executive producer on the series.

Berg has said he was inspired to create the series after reading about the Utah War and the Mountain Meadows Massacre and started researching it. The series incorporates real events, such as the massacre depicted in the pilot, along with the stories of actual people who lived during the 1857 Utah War. Real-life characters such as Jim Bridger, a pioneer caught between warring factions; Brigham Young, the leader of the LDS Church who commanded his army known as the Nauvoo Legion; and Wild Bill Hickman, a lawman and a member of this militia, were incorporated. Berg and Smith met with authors of books about the Massacre and visited the massacre site to try to gain as comprehensive an understanding as possible of how that event happened. Julie O'Keefe served as the show's Indigenous consultant.

=== Casting ===
Taylor Kitsch was confirmed in a lead role in late 2022. In January 2023, Dane DeHaan, Jai Courtney, Betty Gilpin, Shea Whigham, Kyle Davis, Nick Hargrove, Derek Hinkey, Saura Lightfoot-Leon, Preston Mota, Shawnee Pourier and Joe Tippett joined the cast.

=== Filming ===
Filming took place in New Mexico from February 2023, with filming interrupted by the 2023 SAG-AFTRA strike. Kitsch suffered a broken foot during the production. Filming ran for 130 days of which only two days were on indoor sets. The New Mexico locations used included the small towns of Cochiti Pueblo and Santa Clara Pueblo, sound stages in Santa Fe, and Pajarito Ski Mountain, as well as the Bonanza Creek Ranch in northern New Mexico and the Charles R Ranch near Santa Fe. The set builders used only tools available in the 1800s to construct its version of Fort Bridger.

== Music ==
Explosions in the Sky, the post-rock band that previously worked with Berg on the Friday Night Lights film (2005) and Lone Survivor (2013), composed the series music. Netflix Music has released the series' soundtrack.

== Release ==
The miniseries premiered on Netflix on January 9, 2025.

== Reception ==
=== Critical response ===
On the review aggregator website Rotten Tomatoes, American Primeval has a critic approval rating of 72% based on 60 reviews, with an average rating of 6.5/10. The website's critics consensus reads, "Handsomely shot and thoroughly grim, American Primeval drives home its point about a nation's bone-deep savagery to persuasive, and sometimes deadening, effect". Metacritic, which uses a weighted average, assigned a score of 59 out of 100 based on 27 critics, indicating "mixed or average" reviews. The Internet Movie Database (IMDb) rates the show at 8.0/10 based on a weighted average of over 67,000 votes.

=== Historical accuracy ===
Barbara Jones Brown and Darren Parry of the Mormon Stories Podcast both examined the show's depiction of the Utah War era, the Mountain Meadows Massacre, and the representation of Native‑American tribes. They highlighted that the series mixes real events with dramatic invention, and that Brigham Young's role is overstated, stating:....Highly fictionalized – the show "examines key events … through a fictional lens" and takes liberties with personalities and motives. In a Netflix Tudum Behind the Scenes piece, it was mentioned that the production consulted "Mormon consultants" and other experts, yet acknowledges the series is a work of historical fiction rather than a documentary".

==== LDS Church response ====
The Church of Jesus Christ of Latter-day Saints released a statement condemning the show for being "dangerously misleading", and said "[as] to the Mountain Meadows Massacre, which the series inaccurately portrays as reflective of a whole faith group, the Church has long acknowledged and condemned this horrific tragedy. It has also taken significant steps to uncover and share the full truth of what happened and promote healing". The statement also denounced the portrayal of Brigham Young as "egregiously mischaracterized", and called for people to be peacemakers.

== Viewership ==
According to data from Showlabs, American Primeval ranked fourth on Netflix in the United States during the week of 6–12 January 2025.
