= Derek Hinkey =

Native American boxer, actor and model

- Born: David Derek Hinkey
- Citizenship: Fort McDermitt Paiute and Shoshone Tribes and American
- Occupations: Professional boxer, actor, model, stuntman, and motivational speaker
- Years active: 2020s
- Known for: American Primeval
- Height: 6 ft 2 in (188 cm)
- Relatives: Chief Winnemucca
- Boxing career
- Reach: 78 in (198 cm)
- Stance: Orthodox

Boxing record
- Total fights: 12
- Wins: 9
- Win by KO: 8
- Losses: 3
- No contests: 0

Derek Hinkey is a Native American professional boxer, actor, model, stuntman, and motivational speaker. He is a member of the Fort McDermitt Paiute and Shoshone Tribes of the Fort McDermitt Indian Reservation.

== Early life ==
From Reno, Nevada, he worked as a fireman for the Bureau of Land Management before turning professional in boxing.

== Boxing ==
As an amateur boxer, he was Nevada Champion at 165 pounds for five years in a row and also a three-time regional champion.

He is a former professional boxer. He fought in the Super middleweight division and recorded nine victories in 12 professional fights. He made his professional debut in South Lake Tahoe, California in 2007 with a first-round knockout over Patrick Sierra. He won by knockout against his next three opponents before suffering his first loss in February 2008.

== Acting career ==
In January 2023, he was cast in Netflix historical drama series American Primeval. In the series, he portrays Red Feather, the leader of the Wolf Clan, a renegade group of Shoshone warriors.

He previously had supporting roles in Walker: Independence and Kevin Costner's Horizon: An American Saga – Chapter 1. He had a role in western television series Django. In 2024, he was cast in season three of AMC+ series Dark Winds.

== Personal life ==
From Nevada, he has lived in Las Vegas and worked as a model. He has Indigenous American heritage.

== Filmography ==
Year	Title	Role	Notes
2022	Walker: Independence	Apache rider	1 episode
2023	Django	Comanche with infantry jacket	
2023	Americana	Hank Spears	
2024	Horizon: An American Saga – Chapter 1	Papago scout	
2025	American Primeval	Red Feather	6 episodes
2025	Dark Winds	Shorty Bowlegs	Season three

== Filmography ==
- Derek Hinkey at IMDb
