= Skinwalkers (novel) =

1986 novel by Tony Hillerman

- First edition
- Author: Tony Hillerman
- Cover artist: Peter Thorpe
- Language: English
- Series: Jim Chee / Joe Leaphorn Navajo Tribal Police Series
- Genre: Mystery
- Published: 1986 Harper & Row
- Publication place: United States
- Media type: Print and audio
- Pages: 216
- Awards: 1988 Anthony Award for Best Novel; 1987 Spur Award for Best Western Novel
- ISBN: 0-06-015695-3
- OCLC: 606031842
- Preceded by: The Ghostway (1984)
- Followed by: A Thief of Time (1988)

Skinwalkers is a crime novel by American writer Tony Hillerman, the seventh in the Joe Leaphorn/Jim Chee Navajo Tribal Police series, published in 1986. The film version, Skinwalkers, was adapted for television for the PBS Mystery! series in 2002.

== Plot summary ==
Murders are happening all over the huge reservation, and Lt. Leaphorn can see no pattern. Then, someone makes an attempt on Jim Chee's life, and the two work together for the first time to solve these crimes.

The novel won two awards, the 1988 Anthony Award for Best Novel and the 1987 Spur Award for Best Western Novel. Reviews at the time of publication praised it highly: "Hillerman brings together his two series characters--middle-aged, cynical Lieut. Joe Leaphorn and young, mystical Officer Jim Chee--without in any way diminishing the stark power and somber integrity that have distinguished previous exploits of the Navajo Tribal Police." The writing is "lively and extremely descriptive" and author Hillerman was "a master of character, scene, and plot". A New York Times review called this the breakout novel for Hillerman, when sales began to surge and recognition increased.

== Plot ==
Jim Chee wakes from restless sleep about 2:30 am, hearing the cat enter through the cat door into his trailer. When Chee is out of bed, three shotgun blasts come through the trailer wall over his bed, tearing apart his mattress instead of him. In daylight, he finds where a vehicle leaking oil had parked in the night and the footprints of a small person. This is added to the list of unsolved homicides facing Lt. Joe Leaphorn, who asks that Chee be assigned full-time to aid him in solving the homicides of Irma Onesalt, Dugai Endocheeney, and Wilson Sam, and to find who shot at Chee. Captain Largo agrees.

The first connection among these homicides comes when they learn that Endocheeney received a letter from the office where Irma Onesalt worked. Then Leaphorn learns of the list of people for whom she sought death dates, though some on the list were alive when she was posing her question. Leaphorn and Chee learn to communicate effectively with each other, as they pursue the investigation. Chee sleeps away from his trailer bed, fearing a repeat attack until the culprit is found. The next link among the cases is small bone beads, made from a long-dead bovine. One was in the shotgun shells that entered Chee's trailer; another was in the knife wounds that killed Endocheeney; and one was found in Bistie's wallet when he was taken in for questioning.

Leaphorn and Chee go to Bistie's home to talk again, after he was set free by public defender Janet Pete. No one is home, evidence exists of someone recently dragged out of the hogan. As they follow tracks outdoors, someone shoots Leaphorn in his right arm. After he is taken to the hospital at Gallup, Chee and other officers follow the drag marks to find Bistie's corpse, dead from two gunshots to the chest, likely from the same gun that hit Leaphorn's arm. Chee observes a small mark above the bullet wounds on Bistie's body, likely from a crystal gazer who made a cut and claimed to take bone from his body, telling Bistie it was from a skinwalker. They do not catch the shooter. Chee gets two letters. One is from Mary Landon saying she will not return to the reservation. The other is from a client for a Blessing Way ceremony, a pleasing prospect.

The belief or superstition of skinwalkers involves the skinwalker somewhat magically blowing a bit of bone into a victim, who will die unless the skinwalker is killed. Bistie's daughter thinks her father had been trying to kill a skinwalker, to regain his own life, which would end soon by untreatable liver cancer. She did not call the public defender for her father. Janet Pete says Mr. Curtis Atcitty called her, but Bistie told her he knew no such man. Pete thinks this Atcitty used her to get Bistie out of jail both before he might talk to the police and so he could be killed. Another client, Irma Onesalt, was shot 10 days after she approached Pete for help on her list.

Leaphorn learns from Shorty McGinnis that Wilson Sam had received a letter from Irma Onesalt about two months earlier, making enough links among the victims for Leaphorn. He brings Emma to the hospital for tests. Chee visits the Badwater Clinic, learning of the argument between Onesalt and Yellowhorse from Mrs. Billie at the desk. He then proceeds to his meeting at Dinebito Wash with Alice Yazzie to arrange the Blessing Way ceremony. Captain Largo knows where Chee is; Leaphorn pursues him after learning that it is an empty home where the meeting is set up. Leaphorn meets Lenny Skeet in Piñon, where they both drive to the hogan. Chee realizes too late that he has been set up. A young mother shoots him in the back with her automatic shotgun as he runs. With the door of the hogan between them, she tells him he is a skinwalker who marked her baby for death. She tells him Dr. Yellowhorse told her Chee was a witch, a sorcerer. He tells her he is not. Lenny Skeet and Leaphorn arrive to find Chee barely alive in that hogan. They bring him to Badwater Clinic, where he murmurs, "Woman, baby dying", before his treatment began.

Dr. Vigil tells Leaphorn that Emma has a brain tumor. Surgery will reveal its status, and tell the odds of her surviving the tumor, forcing him to accept hope again. Then, the reason for the homicides falls into place, and he must get from Gallup to Badwater Clinic, because Dr. Yellowhorse, the man who wants to improve health of the Navajo people, will kill Chee. Yellowhorse assumed Chee would figure out his scheme, as Irma Onesalt had. Yellowhorse was cheating by claiming reimbursements months after patients died at the clinic or went home healthy, so she had to be killed. Yellowhorse returns to the clinic and goes straight for Chee, both threatening Chee's life and confessing what he did. The woman, the grieving mother arrives next with her shotgun, and kills Yellowhorse, the skinwalker, just as Leaphorn arrives. Yellowhorse first arranged for men to be killed whose names were on Irma Onesalt's list. Then, he had her killed and next set the bereaved mother toward Chee. Agent Streib is already working on tracing the financial crimes. They guess he will not think to trace down which patients Yellowhorse persuaded to kill the four victims, as the mother attacked Chee, but that is okay, it is over.

== Characters ==
- Jim Chee: Sergeant in the Navajo Tribal Police for the last seven years, he graduated from the University of New Mexico, and recently started a practice as a yataalii, doing the Blessing Way service once so far, a part of traditional Navajo culture. He lives in Shiprock.
- Joe Leaphorn: Lieutenant in the Navajo Tribal Police, he works out of the Window Rock office. He has been a police officer for more than two decades and married for three decades, since he finished college at Arizona State University. His mind is occupied by concerns for his wife's health.
- Emma Leaphorn: Beloved wife of Joe, and recently subject to headaches, loss of memory, disorientation, but she is unwilling to see a doctor about it. Her sister Agnes has come to care for her when Joe is at work. Emma is deeply traditional in Navajo culture, but not very willing to seek any help for her troubles.
- Captain Largo: Chee's superior officer at the Shiprock office of the Navajo Tribal Police
- Bahe Yellowhorse: A medical doctor, he runs the Badwater Clinic on the reservation. His mother was Navajo, his father was Oglala Sioux. He was adopted from a Mormon orphanage by a wealthy family when his mother died young. He inherited wealth and uses it to subsidize the clinic. He claims to be a crystal gazer, as well as a medical doctor, willing to send people to whichever treatment will help them.
- Jay Kennedy: An FBI agent based in Farmington, he is working on the Bistie homicide.
- Delbert L. (Dilly) Streib: FBI agent in charge, he is working on the Endocheeney and Onesalt homicides, and the attempted murder of Chee.
- Janet Pete: An attorney called to defend Roosevelt Bistie, she is Navajo in appearance, and very attractive.
- Roosevelt Bistie: A Navajo man with an obvious liver illness, as his skin is turning yellow, he has two daughters. He lives with one of them. He admits to shooting Endocheeney with his rifle after gaining a diagnosis at Badwater Clinic. He, too, is murdered.
- Dugai Endocheeney: A widowed Navajo man in his seventies, he was found murdered (with knife wounds) near his hogan on the lands where he keeps his sheep at Nokaito Bench near where the Chinle Creek joins the San Juan River.
- Irma Onesalt: A Navajo woman, 31 years old, she worked in the tribal social services office. She was murdered, shot as she drove her car on a road between Upper Greasewood and Lukachukai nearly two months before the story opens; her case is yet unsolved. She was not liked by many, due to her outspoken, obnoxious ways.
- Wilson Sam: A Navajo man, 57 years old, he was hit in the head by a shovel, dragged to the edge of Chilchinbito Canyon in Arizona, and pushed over the edge. His body was found by his nephew. Death was estimated about the same time Endocheeney was murdered. He was a herder of sheep, and sometime worker for the road department.
- Boy-child: A baby born with an unformed brain, he is doomed to a short life from his untreatable condition, anencephaly. One of his parents, who speaks only Navajo, attempted to kill Chee with a shotgun as he slept in his trailer, persuaded that Chee is the skinwalker who put a death bone in the baby, as Dr. Yellowhorse demonstrated by removing it.
- Franklin Begay: He is taken from Badwater Clinic by Chee as a favor to Irma Onesalt, so he could testify in meeting about land ownership. Irma Onesalt criticized Chee for bringing the "wrong Begay", as he had not been the one whose family had lived on the land, when Chee came to return the man to the clinic.
- Ironwoman: At the Badwater Wash trading post, she shares information about Endocheeney with Chee, and the word that a piece of bone, corpse bone, was found in one of the knife wounds, like the trademark sign of a skinwalker. She is a Navajo of the Jewish religion.
- Randolph Jenks: A pathologist at the US Indian Service hospital in Gallup, he who analyzes the bead found in Chee's trailer, the old bovine bone bead. Irma Onesalt had contacted him before she died about diseases and their proper course of treatment, and her list of names where she sought date of death.
- Shorty McGinnis: Owner of the Short Mountain trading post for decades, he is a source for local information for Lt. Leaphorn about Wilson Sam.
- Alice Yazzie: Her name is signed on the letter asking Chee to perform a Blessing Way ceremony for a relative who had sought help at Badwater Clinic, and to meet at the home of Hildegarde Goldtooth.
- Mrs. Eleanor Billie: She works at the front desk of Badwater Clinic. She looked up October 3 death of Frank Begay after Chee picked up the "wrong Begay" (Franklin Begay) for Irma Onesalt, two months earlier. She also saw the list of people for whom Irma Onesalt was seeking dates of death shortly before she herself was killed.
- Leonard Skeet: A Navaho Tribal Police officer at Piñon chapter house, he drives Leaphorn out to the empty hogan where Chee went on his day off. Skeet's wife Aileen Beno knew that her aunt Hildegarde Goldtooth was dead and her hogan was empty.
- Dr. Vigil: A neurologist, he diagnoses Emma at the Indian Health Service hospital in Gallup.

== Geography ==
In his 2011 book, Tony Hillerman's Navajoland: Hideouts, Haunts, and Havens in the Joe Leaphorn and Jim Chee Mysteries, author Laurance D. Linford has listed these 72 geographical locations, real and fictional, mentioned in Skinwalkers.

1. Badwater Clinic (fictitious location)
2. Beclabito, NM
3. Big Mountain, AZ
4. Big Mountain Trading Post, AZ
5. Black Mesa, AZ
6. Blue Gap, AZ
7. Borrego Pass (Trading Post), NM
8. Burnt Water, AZ
9. Cañoncito, NM
10. Carrizo Mountains, AZ
11. Casa Del Eco Mesa, UT
12. Checkerboard Reservation, NM
13. Chilchinbito Canyon, AZ
14. Chinle, AZ
15. Chinle Wash, AZ
16. Chuska Mountains, NM & AZ
17. Cross Canyon (Trading Post), AZ
18. Crownpoint, NM
19. Crystal, NM
20. Dinnebito Wash, AZ
21. Dinnehotso (Trading Post), AZ
22. Farmington, NM
23. Flagstaff, AZ
24. Forest Lake, AZ
25. Fort Sumner (Old), NM
26. Gallup, NM
27. Ganado, AZ
28. The Goosenecks, UT
29. Greasewood Flats, AZ
30. Hopi Mesas (Hopi Reservation), AZ
31. Kinleechee, AZ
32. Klagetoh (Trading Post), AZ
33. Little Water, NM
34. Little Water Wash, NM
35. Lone Tule Wash, AZ
36. Lukachukai, AZ
37. Lukachukai Mountains, AZ
38. Many Farms, AZ
39. Mesa De Los Lobos, NM
40. Mexican Hat, UT
41. Mexican Water Trading Post, Arizona
42. Montezuma Creek, UT
43. Mount Taylor, NM
44. Nokaito Bench, UT
45. Painted Desert, AZ
46. Piñon, AZ
47. Red Rock
48. Red Rock Trading Post, AZ
49. Roof Butte, AZ
50. Rough Rock, AZ
51. Round Top Trading Post, AZ
52. St. Johns, AZ
53. San Juan River, CO, NM, & UT
54. Sanostee, NM
55. Scattered Willow Draw, AZ
56. Sege Butte (fictitious location)
57. Sheep Springs, NM
58. Shiprock (community), NM
59. Short Mountain Trading Post (fictitious location)
60. Sleeping Ute Mountain, CO
61. Teec Nos Pos, AZ
62. Three Turkey Ruin, AZ
63. Toadlena, NM
64. Tuba City, AZ
65. Two Grey Hills, NM
66. Tyende Creek, AZ
67. Upper Greasewood (Trading Post), AZ
68. Whippoorwill (Spring), AZ
69. Wide Ruin Wash, AZ
70. Window Rock, AZ
71. Zuni Pueblo, NM
72. Zuni Mountains, NM

== Author's note ==
Tony Hillerman says in the author's note to this book that his spelling (yataalii) is not the most common, which is hataalii. Badwater Wash, its clinic, and trading post, as well as Short Mountain, are all fictional places. A traditional Navajo hataalii might disapprove of Chee arranging a Blessing Way by letter, instead of a face-to-face request, or even practicing his sand painting out of doors, outside a hogan.

== Reception ==
The novel was well received. Greg Herren, for Reviewing the Evidence, found that the "suspense gradually builds until the reader cannot help but turn the page, regardless of the time" stating that Hillerman is "a master of character, scene, and plot", concluding that "what makes Skinwalkers so outstanding, for me, is that it takes the reader inside the world of the Navajo reservation". Alicia Karen Elkins, for Rambles magazine, stated that she "could not put this book down and read it completely in one sitting", finding that it "will keep you edge of your seat and amaze you with unexpected twists" and that "the writing is lively and extremely descriptive"; concluding "I highly recommend it for anyone with an interest in Native American folklore or culture".

Kirkus Reviews finds this joining of two detectives does not diminish the series, and this novel has tautly orchestrated tensions.

Deborah Stead, writing in The New York Times, called this the breakout novel for author Hillerman, in a review of the author and his books at the time of the release of novel following this one, A Thief of Time. She said, "despite a loyal following among mystery fans, book sales in the United States did not surge until The Skinwalkers," the first novel Hillerman wrote after quitting his university position to write full-time, and which joined his two Navajo police officers, Joe Leaphorn and Jim Chee.

== Awards ==
The novel won the 1988 Anthony Award for "Best Novel". It won the Spur Award from the Western Writers Association in 1987 for Best Western Novel.

== Adaptations ==
The novel was adapted for television in the 2002 film Skinwalkers, airing on PBS's series Mystery!. The plot has some changes from the novel, as all the victims are medicine men. It was well received. It gained the most viewers of any PBS show in 2002. The film starred Adam Beach as Jim Chee and Wes Studi as Joe Leaphorn. It was the first of Mystery!'s American based stories.

Many years were needed for everything to come together for the television adaptation. Robert Redford and his son James Redford bought the rights to the entire series of novels years before this film was made. In addition to their interest, a venue was needed. PBS made a choice to revamp its Mystery! series, seeking a story by an American writer and set in America. Robert Redford "acknowledges he was taken aback by how difficult it was to bring Hillerman's tales to the big screen "because of the perception of Native Americans not being commercial territory. Second, one couldn't see the larger picture of value of introducing two new characters who are fresh and audiences could adopt. They couldn't see that idea. It was very hard to convince people, so we lost a lot of years."

James Redford, who "shares his dad's passion for the Southwest, wrote the first draft of the Skinwalkers script about eight years ago, and then another draft five or six years later." In between, it was "confronting the reality that getting an all-Native American cast financed above a certain budget was just really hard to do. We are not idiots about the commercial realities. But I think what happens is that we all identify what we are convinced is a sure-fire thing. It was a bestselling author and a mystery genre. But I was sort of surprised there was as much resistance."

== Sources ==
- Linford, Laurance D. (2011). "Index of Places by Hillerman Title". Tony Hillerman's Navajoland: Hideouts, Haunts, and Havens in the Joe Leaphorn and Jim Chee Mysteries. University of Utah Press. ISBN 978-1-60781-988-2 – via Project MUSE.
