= James Redford (filmmaker) =

American filmmaker (1962–2020)

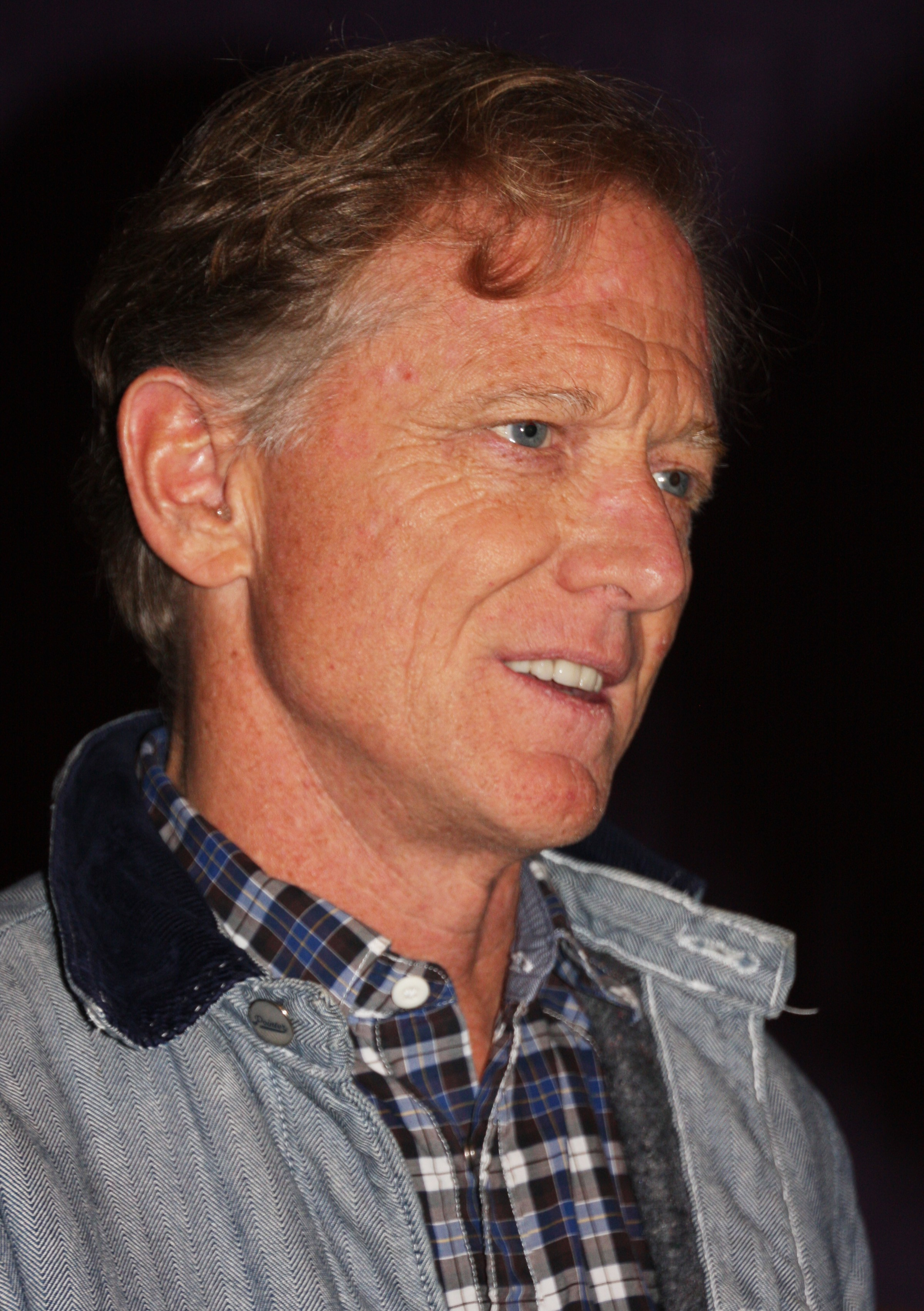
- Redford in 2016
- Born: David James Redford; May 5, 1962; New York City, U.S.
- Died: October 16, 2020 (aged 58); Fairfax, California, U.S.
- Education: University of Colorado (BA); Northwestern University (MA)
- Occupations: Documentary filmmaker; Environmentalist
- Years active: 1996–2020
- Spouse: Kyle (m. 1988)
- Children: 2
- Parents: Robert Redford (father); Lola Van Wagenen (mother)
- Relatives: Amy Redford (sister)

David James Redford (May 5, 1962 – October 16, 2020) was an American documentary filmmaker and environmentalist. He was the son of actor and director Robert Redford and historian Lola Van Wagenen.

== Early life and education ==
David James Redford was born on May 5, 1962 in New York City, the son of historian Lola Van Wagenen and actor-director Robert Redford. He grew up in New York, but spent summers in the Provo Canyon area of Utah, where his family also had a home.

Redford received an undergraduate degree in creative writing and filmmaking from University of Colorado Boulder in 1985. Later he earned a master's degree in English literature from Northwestern University.

In 1993, Redford underwent two liver transplants to combat the effects of primary sclerosing cholangitis. His transplant experience led him to found the James Redford Institute for Transplant Awareness. Through the institute, he was the executive producer of the documentary, The Kindness of Strangers (1999), directed by Maro Chermayeff.

== Career ==
In 2001, Redford was credited as the screenwriter for the western drama Cowboy Up as well as the 2002 television film Skinwalkers. His directorial debut came in 2003 with the movie Spin, which he also screenwrote.

In 2005, he and his father Robert Redford co-founded the San Francisco-based nonprofit called The Redford Center, that produces films and helps filmmakers by providing them grant money.

Redford directed his first documentary film, The Big Picture; Rethinking Dyslexia (2012), based on the challenges faced by his son Dylan in school. Interviewees in the documentary included Richard Branson, Charles Schwab, David Boies, and Gavin Newsom. Also in 2012, he produced Watershed.

His 2013 documentary Toxic Hot Seat dealt with the health problems caused by the use of flame-retardant materials used in furniture. Other movies directed by Redford include Paper Tigers (2013), Resilience (2016), and Happening: A Clean Energy Revolution (2017).

His film Playing for Keeps premiered at the Mill Valley Film Festival in October 2020.

At the time of his death he was at work finishing a documentary on Amy Tan with the working title Where The Past Begins. He died before editing was completed. The film, retitled Amy Tan: An Unintended Memoir, was produced by Redford's friend Karen Pritzker, and premiered at the Sundance Film Festival in February 2021.

After his death, his son Dylan, also a filmmaker, was elected chair of The Redford Center.

== Personal life and death ==
In 1988, Redford married a woman named Kyle. They had two children.

Redford died from bile duct cancer on October 16, 2020, at his home in Fairfax, California. He was 58 years old.
