= People of Darkness =

1980 novel by Tony Hillerman

- First edition cover
- Author: Tony Hillerman
- Cover artist: Francesca Greene
- Language: English
- Series: Joe Leaphorn/Jim Chee Navajo Tribal Police Series
- Genre: Detective fiction
- Set in: Navajo Nation in Southwestern United States
- Published: 1980 Harper & Row
- Publication place: USA
- Media type: Print and audio
- Pages: 202
- ISBN: 0-06-011907-1
- OCLC: 6142519
- Preceded by: Listening Woman (1978)
- Followed by: The Dark Wind (1982)

People of Darkness is a crime novel by American writer Tony Hillerman, the fourth in the Joe Leaphorn/Jim Chee Navajo Tribal Police series, first published in 1980. It is the first novel in the series to feature Officer Jim Chee. The AMC television series Dark Winds adapted the novel in its second season.

Jim Chee takes a position at the Crownpoint, New Mexico, office of the Navajo Tribal Police. New crimes involve a very wealthy white man and several Navajos he befriended nearly 30 years earlier, helping them support their church. His wealth arose from uranium mining, much more profitable than oil drilling.

The novel was well-received: "well-written and gripping . . . [set] against a background of authentic Indian culture, an incredible achievement for a non-Indian writer." and "thoroughly splendid work: moody, atmospheric, complex without contrivance, and properly unsettling." A review written in 2010 was still impressed with the novel, declaring "the great triumph of Hillerman’s art lies in the way he was able to weave this Native American theme into the story, along with all the accompanying cultural background, without ever compromising the mystery."

== Plot summary ==
A bacteriologist in the cancer research hospital, waiting for laboratory results, sees a blond-haired man move something from his car to a pick-up truck parked in an illegal space. She sees a tow truck pull the pick-up away; within seconds, the truck explodes, killing the operators of the tow truck.

A few months later, Jim Chee is asked by Mrs. Vines to find a box stolen from her house, wanting to hire him off-duty. The box contains mementos that she wants back before her husband returns; she thinks Emerson Charley is the thief. Mr. Vines returns, telling Chee not to bother with the task his wife asked him to do. Sheriff Sena is angry at Chee for talking with Mr. and Mrs. Vines. Sena shares the story of the six Navajo men in the crew under Dillon Charley who did not go to work at the oil field years back because Charley had a vision saying something bad would happen that day, which was true. Chee learns that the man whose truck exploded a few months back was Emerson Charley, son of Dillon and head of the People of Darkness church, who has been in the hospital at the University of New Mexico since that day, ill with cancer. Sena believes the motion sensor bomb in the pick-up truck was meant for Emerson, despite his fatal disease.

When Colton Wolf learns about Emerson Charley's death, he goes to the hospital morgue to find, steal and bury his body, which the cancer group wants to autopsy. At a local rug auction, Tomas Charley tells Jim Chee that his father's body was stolen from the hospital. Tomas tells Chee where the stolen box is and that it contains rocks and military medals. Chee meets Mary Landon and asks her out. Next day, they go to fetch the box from the malpais, and encounter Tomas Charley's dead body, killed a minute before. The killer is the same man who met Tomas at the rug auction after Chee did. Colton, the killer, does not like witnesses, so he shoots Chee and sets fire to his vehicle.

Chee is recovering in the hospital after surgery for his gunshot wound, visited by a string of lawmen. Sheriff Sena is driven by the loss of his older brother in that oil field explosion. Sgt. Hunt of the Albuquerque Police Department tells Chee of the history of killings attached to the man who shot him. A sketch of his face from what the bacteriologist saw matches the face Chee saw. Martin from the FBI visits next. Knowing about this man and his methods proves useful when Chee awakens about 3 am to find he has a roommate, and that the blond haired man is in the hospital corridor. Chee hides in the false ceiling space, coming down to find that the other patient was killed by the silenced weapon in his stead, and the nurse is killed as well. Chee calls the Albuquerque Police, but they do not find the killer, who drives off in a stolen car. Chee and Mary Landon research the events of the oil field explosion and what happened to the six Navajos who did not go to work that day. So far, four of the six died of leukemia and one of another cancer, within 5 years of the explosion, highly unusual. They hope to find the body of the sixth, to see what an autopsy might reveal. They realize that is why Emerson Charley's body was stolen from the hospital.

Chee and Mary Landon learn where the sixth man is buried from his sister, up in the Bisti badlands. Colton pretends to the NTP that he is Martin, the FBI agent, so that the NTP will put out radio calls for Chee, which Colton can hear with his police band radio. Chee and Landon find the long-interred body of the sixth man, and can see abnormal bone growth on his skeleton below his pouch, still carrying the mole amulet. Chee puts a note on Colton's car. The note is written on the check Vines gave Chee, saying that Vines will give Colton up to law enforcement. Chee tosses a boulder in his pick-up truck, which explodes from the bomb Colton placed in it. Colton drives away. Mary and Chee wait until daylight when a pipeline company helicopter rescues them. Chee reaches Vines mansion by helicopter just after Colton arrived through the heavy snows of the night. Colton kills Vines, and Mrs. Vines shoots Colton in self-defense.

Vines gave mole-shaped amulets to the six Navajo men on the crew, meant to symbolize their religion, but made of pitchblende. The radiation brought early death by cancer, as the men carried the amulets in a pouch worn on the body. Vines was not a newcomer to the area, but the geologist Carl Lebeck. Lebeck was not killed in the explosion because he rigged it. He revealed himself to Chee by what he failed to note on the reports 30 years earlier—uranium is being mined now, above the level where oil was expected in the core samples Lebeck analyzed, but was not noted. Vines did not want an active oil field in someone else's ownership when he could make a fortune by buying the lease for the land and selling the rights for the uranium. That white man acted like Navajo witch, in a twist ending.

== Title ==
The Navajo word that means mole, the underground hunting animal, if literally translated, also means the people of darkness. The amulet used for the church started by Dillon Charley was a mole, a gift made by the character Vines in honor of his own money being made by mining uranium below the soil, and the earlier escape from the 1948 oil field explosion for the church members.

== Characters ==
- Sgt Jim Chee: Sergeant in the Navajo Tribal Police, who recently began work at the Crownpoint, New Mexico office. His college degree is from University of New Mexico in anthropology. He is training to be a yataalii (traditional healer). He received an offer to work for the FBI as the story opens, needing to reply in a few weeks.
- Trixie Dodge: Officer of Navajo Tribal Police at the Crownpoint office
- Henry Becenti: Retired NTP whose position Chee now fills; he explains the past relationship with Sena.
- Lawrence ‘Gordo’ Sena: Sheriff of Valencia County and involved in Valencia County policing for nearly 30 years. He has a long time interest in the oil field explosion in early 1948 because his older brother was killed by it. His anger, rooted in his grief at the loss of his brother when the six Navajo men survived, impedes his success in solving the crime of 1948.
- Mrs. Rosemary Vines: Second wife of B. J. Vines who asks Jim Chee to find a stolen box before her husband returns from medical treatment.
- Mr B. J. Vines: Very wealthy man in his fifties with full white beard; he gained his wealth by selling leases to Anaconda for uranium rights on his land he acquired as a ranch about 30 years prior. He suffered a stroke and uses a wheel chair, and is a collector of trophies and mementos. In younger days, once he became wealthy, he was a big game hunter.
- Carl Lebeck: Geologist present at the oil field when the explosion occurred in early 1948 where so many were killed, his job to log the core samples taken in the search for oil at that spot. Returns to the area as B. J. Vines.
- Dillon Charley: Navajo worker on the Vines ranch, buried on the present estate since 1953. He started a sect of the Native American Church during the 1940s that used peyote as part of the religious rites, though it was at that time banned on the Navajo reservation. Later US Supreme Court Decision allowed the religious use of peyote.
- Emerson Charley: Son of Dillon, continued as head of church started by father, reviving it recently. In this novel, he is dying of leukemia at the University of New Mexico hospital. After he dies, Wolf steals his body and buries it in a landfill.
- Tomas Charley: Navajo son of Emerson and his Acoma wife, who took the box of rocks and medals from the Vines mansion. He is murdered by Wolf.
- Rudolph Charley: Younger brother to Tomas, and head of the peyote church after Tomas dies. He held a ceremony to honor his brother after his death, where Chee and Mary Landon met Mrs. Musket.
- Five Navajo men: Men who died young of leukemia or another cancer, but were spared death on the day of the oil field explosion, being advised by Dillon Charley, their supervisor as roustabouts for that project, that something bad would happen that day. All carried amulets given as gifts by Vines. Roscoe Sam, Joseph Sam, Woody Begay, Rudolph Becenti, and Windy Tsossie are the five men.
- Mrs. Fannie Kinlicheenie: Sister to Woody Begay, who knows when he died and where he is buried She was active in the church with her brother. When the Enemy Way ceremonial did not cure her brother, she knew there was a witch involved, and the evil would turn back on him. She believed the witch was Dillon Charley, who died after her brother.
- Dr. Sherman Huff: Doctor at the UNM cancer hospital who explains cancer to Chee and then mentions the local cancer clusters. He finds four of the six Navajos on the state's cancer registry.
- Mrs. Romana Musket: sister-in-law to Windy Tsossie. She knows when he died and where he was buried, near the Bisti, where Chee and Mary Landon go to see his remains for signs of cancer. They see the growth on the bones near the amulet he wore in life.
- Colton Wolf: Blond-haired man with a knack for making his own mechanical devices, including guns and silencers, a true loner. He works as a hired hit man getting his directions via post office box from a person known only as Boxholder to him. He longs to know the name of his real father and find his mother; he was known as Colton Fry in his childhood. He wants to know who has been hiring him.
- Boxholder: Codename for the person who hires Colton Wolf these many years for contract murders by many means.
- Mary Landon: School teacher from town near Milwaukee, Wisconsin, a white woman or Anglo who now teaches in Crown Point; she and Chee meet at a local rug auction.
- Martin: FBI agent who tells Chee of the trail of crimes over ten years tied to this man, and that he and Mary are the first known by Wolf to witness him in the commission of a crime, and survive.
- Sergeant Hunt: Agent from the Albuquerque NM police department in charge of unsolved homicides, where the cancer research hospital is located, and where the pick-up truck exploded. He shows Chee a sketch of the man who shot him, based on the earlier crime in Albuquerque, where an employee observed Wolf, unknown to him.

== Geography ==
In his 2011 book Tony Hillerman's Navajoland: Hideouts, Haunts, and Havens in the Joe Leaphorn and Jim Chee Mysteries, author Laurance D. Linford has listed the following 24 geographical locations, real and fictional, mentioned in People of Darkness.

- Albuquerque, New Mexico
- Ambrosia Lake, New Mexico
- Bisti (Badlands and Trading Post), New Mexico
- Borrego Pass (Trading Post), New Mexico
- Cañoncito, New Mexico
- Cebolleta Mesa, New Mexico
- Chaco Wash, New Mexico
- Checkerboard Reservation, New Mexico
- Chinle, Arizona
- Chuska Mountains, New Mexico and Arizona
- Coyote Canyon
- Coyote Wash, New Mexico
- Crownpoint, New Mexico
- El Malpais National Monument, New Mexico
- Grants, New Mexico
- Heart Butte, New Mexico
- Mount Taylor (New Mexico)
- Ojo Encino, New Mexico
- Pueblo Pintado, New Mexico
- Rough Rock, Arizona
- Shiprock (Community), New Mexico
- Standing Rock, New Mexico
- Thoreau, New Mexico
- Zuni Mountains, New Mexico

== Reviews ==
Gumshoe Review notes that Hillerman is the master of his genre, even upon rereading almost 30 years later:

Tony Hillerman remains the undisputed master of this genre.... the great triumph of Hillerman’s art lies in the way he was able to weave this Native American theme into the story, along with all the accompanying cultural background, without ever compromising the mystery.

The Sun-Sentinel stated, "Not only are the stories well-written and gripping, but they also play against a background of authentic Indian culture, an incredible achievement for a non-Indian writer."

Kirkus Reviews determined:

Hillerman may overdo the Indian vs. white identity crisis this time--Mary and Jim talk too much--but otherwise this is thoroughly splendid work: moody, atmospheric, complex without contrivance, and properly unsettling. Top work from a top talent.

== Allusions to real events ==
After the development of the atomic bomb, the demand for uranium, previously of little value, grew sharply. Fortunes were made in the Four Corners area of the US during the period of high demand, for example, by Charles Steen.

The lands of the eastern portion of the Navajo Nation, in New Mexico, are called the Checkerboard reservation. This arose from the way in which land was given to railroads in the 19th century, leaving questions of who owns land, a problem for police jurisdictions among others.

== Television adaptation ==
The first season of Dark Winds is primarily based on Listening Woman which was published in 1978, with elements from People of Darkness, which is also adapted into the second season.

== Sources ==
- Linford, Laurance D. (2011). "Index of Places by Hillerman Title". Tony Hillerman's Navajoland: Hideouts, Haunts, and Havens in the Joe Leaphorn and Jim Chee Mysteries. University of Utah Press. ISBN 978-1-60781-988-2 – via Project MUSE.
