= Rhiana Yazzie =

American dramatist

Rhiana Yazzie is a Navajo playwright, actor, and filmmaker. She is based in the Twin Cities where she founded New Native Theater in 2009.

== Early life ==
An enrolled member of the Navajo Nation, Yazzie grew up in Albuquerque, New Mexico. According to her mother, she's been telling stories since she was a child.

== Education and career ==
Yazzie attended the University of New Mexico from 1995 to 1999, earning a bachelor's degree in theater. From 2000 to 2002 she attended the University of Southern California and earned a master's degree in professional writing. She moved to Minneapolis, Minnesota for Playwrights' Center Fellowship, calling the city a "Mecca for Native arts, writing, [and] culture. She was awarded the Playwrights' Center Jerome Fellowship two times, in 2006/2007 and in 2010/2011. In 2009, Yazzie created New Native Theater which "produces, commissions, and devises authentic Native American stories for the stage." Yazzie started NNT to connect the 100+ theaters in town and the large urban native community. As the head of one of the few Native theater companies in the United States, Yazzie has expressed that her work can be isolating. However, she recognizes the importance of the NNT company in helping herself and other Natives creatively find their place in the world through classes and shows. The company has an open door policy, so Natives of all ages can work with the company.

== Work ==
=== Plays ===
- 2012: The Musical is a music comedy about Natives living in Minneapolis who are expecting the return of Indian Alien ancestors because the end of the Mayan calendar is approaching.
- Ady is a play about a Navajo woman who finds a vintage photograph of a woman in 1937 who is her doppelganger. The photograph sends her into a vortex of history to explore the surrealist movement and her mother's suicide on her reservation.
- Asdzani Shash, The Woman Who Turned into a Bear is a play that reimagines a Navajo legend about a woman who turns into a bear. This woman must make a choice to remain human or become an animal when he life is complicated by the return of an abusive ex.
- Las Madres is a one act play is from the perspective of the grandchildren of families in Argentina affected by the government removal of native children from their families.
- The Long Flight is a one-act play is about the redemption of a Navajo man.
- Rainbow Crow, a musical adaptation of the Lenape legend of the same name.

==== Audio theater ====
- Little Apple, Big Apple is a podcast that follows two sisters in the Twin Cities who start a mental-health acting troupe. They navigate their own complicated lives while they attempt to make a difference in their community.
- The Best Place to Grow Pumpkins is a twenty-six minute play is about a young girl living on a Navajo reservation who wants a magical pumpkin patch.

=== Filmography ===
- A Stray (2016) is about a Muslim in Minneapolis who crosses paths with a stray dog.
- Homecoming (2015) is about a marine whose partner dies in combat.
- Injunuity (2013) is an animated film which explores Nativeness.
- A Winter Love (2021) a modern day inter-tribal love story

== Awards ==
- In 2017, Yazzie won a Sally award, which celebrates Minnesotan's commitment to the arts.
- In March 2018, Yazzie was one of twenty-four to win St. Paul's Bush Foundation fellowship. Yazzie plans to use this opportunity to connect with aboriginal theatre companies around the world.
- In 2020 she was one of the winners of the Steinberg Playwright Awards
