= Listening Woman =

1978 book by Tony Hillerman

- First edition
- Author: Tony Hillerman
- Cover artist: Frank Bozzo
- Language: English
- Series: Jim Chee / Joe Leaphorn Navajo Tribal Police Series
- Genre: Mystery
- Set in: Navajo Nation
- Published: 1978 Harper & Row
- Publication place: United States
- Media type: Print and audio
- ISBN: 0-06-011901-2 first US edition
- OCLC: 3311741
- Preceded by: Dance Hall of the Dead (1973)
- Followed by: People of Darkness (1980)

Listening Woman is a crime novel by American writer Tony Hillerman, the third in the Joe Leaphorn/Jim Chee Navajo Tribal Police series, first published in 1978. The novel features Joe Leaphorn.

Pursuing what begins as a routine police call, Leaphorn is nearly killed by the driver of a car. He is then entangled in a tense hostage situation in the caves near the San Juan River.

The novel was nominated for the 1979 "Best Mystery Novel" Edgar Award. It was well-received as "a compelling and often chilling book". and noted for "unselfconsciously drawing on the best of two clashing cultures."

== Plot ==
After talking with Hosteen Tso to learn what will best improve his health, Margaret Cigarette walks away from the hogan on Nokaito Bench to ponder his situation and prepare her advice. She returns to find both Tso and her niece dead. Initial investigation does not find the killer, or any possible motive for this crime.

Leaphorn is returning from a Kinaalda ceremony with a man who escaped arrest earlier. A car at very high speed approaches them, and slows seeing the police car’s flashing lights. Once Leaphorn is outside the car, the driver attempts to kill him with the vehicle, but Leaphorn moves away in time. The man wore gold rimmed glasses, had black hair and had a huge dog in the back seat. Leaphorn talks with Shorty McGinnis, where he meets Theodora Adams, who seeks Benjamin Tso. At the Tso hogan, Leaphorn observes Benjamin saying Catholic mass in the dawn. Later, Leaphorn returns to the Kinaalda to talk with Margaret Cigarette. He saw a name on a light carried by a boy there, which he realized was the name of the pilot of a helicopter lost in a dramatic theft of cash from an armored car in Santa Fe a few years earlier by members of the Buffalo Society, an extremist break-away group from AIM. The next step is a visit to the FBI office in Albuquerque to read the file for that case. He reads about Tull and Hoski, the latter a man of many aliases. While there, Leaphorn realizes that Mrs. Cigarette sat in a different spot than he originally assumed, one that meant the killer of Hosteen Tso and Annie came from the canyon, not the road. When that killer emerges from the canyon again, Father Benjamin and Theodora are the people who will be found in the hogan.

Leaphorn drives to the area of the hogan, parking on solid ground, then walking to the hogan. He does not find them there. Rain washed the tracks outside, but he sees large dog paw prints inside the hogan. Leaphorn spends a harrowing 30 hours in the caves of the canyon wall, escaping from the dog or the men who brought the dog. John Tull is one, and the other he knows as Gold Rims, for his eye glasses. He survives the dog, fire set to kill him, dynamite closing a cavern entrance, and long hours in total darkness. He manages to kill the dog, by letting it run over the edge of the upper cliff, though his first attempt to kill the dog lost him his service revolver. Walking through the connected caverns he realizes the caves are a hiding place for the men and they do not know he is still alive. He finds water to drink, realizing it is from Lake Powell. Then he hears voices. A man carries away some boxes from a cache of food, gasoline, a case of dynamite sticks, timers but no blasting caps. Leaphorn takes some food, over thirty hours since he ate. Then he plans his escape route, having found the cave’s mouth. His flash light and binoculars have been useful all this time.

Leaphorn encounters Father Benjamin Tso, arms and legs tied, who mentions his brother, one year older, raised separately – Gold Rims to Leaphorn. Gold Rims is part of the Buffalo Society and of the hostage event that Leaphorn heard mentioned on the police radio hours before. The Boy Scout hostages from an event in Canyon de Chelly are present in a caged area, where Theodora Adams is also held. Leaphorn unties Father Tso, who observes that both his brother and Tull are insane. Leaphorn follows Gold Rims and Tull. Leaphorn’s plan is that Father Tso will distract the next of the kidnappers to enter the cave, so that Leaphorn can take that man down. Waiting for that moment, Leaphorn finds the cave where Standing Medicine had left over thirty sand paintings for a special ceremony, a great gift to his people from over 100 years earlier. When the kidnapper arrives, Father Tso plays his role as he sees it, asking the man to give him the gun; the man shoots before Leaphorn can complete his ambush. Father Tso is dead. So is Jackie Noni, felled by Leaphorn’s well-aimed projectile. Leaphorn takes the shotgun, unlocks the cage around the hostages, telling them to disappear and tell no one of his presence, while he deals with John Tull. The caves have dynamite on timers, meant to kill the hostages, and the three from the Buffalo Society. But Father Benjamin’s body could do for his brother’s in the tally, as no one knows he was in the cave and Hoski / Jimmy Tso wants to leave alone for a new life with his girlfriend. Gold Rims is Hoski; he returns to the cave with the ransom cash and two boats. Tull is about to change a timer to blow up sooner, then two shots are heard and the dynamite kills them both. Leaphorn finds the boats, puts the money sack with the two dead men, and then gets all the hostages onto the boats and in the lake, away from the explosions. He shoots a gasoline can to make a signal fire, which draws an army helicopter. Leaphorn totes up the people killed by Hoski, and the motives for each murder. Theodora Adams asks why Father Tso put himself in fatal danger, which she will have to figure out herself. The gift of Standing Medicine is probably still intact, well protected in the dry cave.

== Reception ==
The novel was well received, with author Marcia Muller stating that "his stark depiction of the New Mexico landscape is particularly fine" and that she found the work to be "a compelling and often chilling book". The novel was also nominated for the 1979 "Best Mystery Novel" Edgar Award.

== Allusions to real events and persons ==
Standing Medicine, the great grandfather to Hosteen Tso, is said to have died after the Long Walk of the Navajo, an event that occurred in the 1860s.

== Television adaptation ==
The first season of Dark Winds (2022) is primarily based on Listening Woman and parts of People of Darkness which followed in 1980.

== Sources ==
- Linford, Laurance D. (2011). "Index of Places by Hillerman Title". Tony Hillerman's Navajoland: Hideouts, Haunts, and Havens in the Joe Leaphorn and Jim Chee Mysteries. University of Utah Press. ISBN 978-1-60781-988-2 – via Project MUSE.
