= A Thief of Time =

1988 novel by Tony Hillerman

- First edition
- Author: Tony Hillerman
- Cover artist: Peter Thorpe
- Language: English
- Series: Joe Leaphorn/Jim Chee Navajo Tribal Police Series
- Genre: Mystery
- Publisher: Harper & Row
- Publication date: 1988
- Publication place: USA
- Media type: Print and audio
- Pages: 209 plus maps
- Awards: Macavity Award
- ISBN: 0-06-015938-3
- OCLC: 18041978
- Preceded by: Skinwalkers (1986)
- Followed by: Talking God (1989)

A Thief of Time is a crime novel by American writer Tony Hillerman, the eighth in the Joe Leaphorn/Jim Chee Navajo Tribal Police series, first published in 1988.

It was adapted for television in 2004 as the second film from a Hillerman book. It was part of the PBS Mystery! series.

The story explores human ambition through the lure of the thousand-year-old Anasazi ruins, a missing anthropologist, a stolen backhoe, and people who steal ancient pots from reservation land. Chee is pulled into the case while tracking a stolen backhoe. Leaphorn, now a widower, follows the trail of ancient pots bought and sold.

This novel won the Macavity Award for Best Novel in 1989 and was nominated for two others: The Edgar Award and the Anthony Award.

== Plot summary ==
Joe Leaphorn, a Navajo Tribal Police officer, is on leave and grieving his wife, who died during brain surgery. He intends to quit the police force when BLM agent Thatcher takes him along on a call to talk with Dr. Eleanor Friedman-Bernal, who has been accused of stealing Anasazi relics from protected land... only she isn't there. Her friends at Chaco National Park reported her as a missing person, and think the officers are finally there to look for her.

Dr. Eleanor Friedman-Bernal is an anthropologist interested in ceramics. Before she went missing, she was close to a major new discovery: identifying an individual pot maker by the art on the pots. Leaphorn suspects the anonymous call reporting Dr Friedman-Bernal and her disappearance after a planned weekend away are connected.

After a piece of digging equipment is stolen from the tribal motor pool, Chee traces the thieves. One is known to Slick Nakai, the preacher. Leaphorn and Chee separately show up at Nakai's next revival meeting. Leaphorn learns that Nakai sold pots to Eleanor, while Chee learns about the backhoe thief. Leaphorn notices the same Navajo man helping at the revival that he saw working with Maxie Davis at Chaco.

Chee seeks the backhoe, finding it with a trailer at the bottom of a canyon. There he finds two dead men in the moonlight: Joe B. Nails in the truck cab, and Jimmy Etcitty on the ground.

Leaphorn visits Maxie Davis and Randall Elliot to gain more information about Eleanor. When she left, she took her camping gear and was likely heading out to check on her latest discoveries. Leaphorn meets Chee at the murder site, where they connect on their two reasons to be there: the missing anthropologist and the missing motor pool equipment.

They find no good tracks of the murderer, but Chee counts the bags. Three were removed from the box, yet only two are filled with pots and pieces. The third bag turns up in Elliot's kitchen trash, filled with Anasazi bones, tagged for one of two important sites. They focus their work on finding the anthropologist.

Leaphorn pursues the trail of a particular pot that Houk sold to an auction house after buying it from Jimmy Etcitty. The buyer in New York City has the form showing the exact place the pot was found, so Leaphorn meets Richard DuMont to get that description. The details of the site are correct, but the canyon is on Navajo land.

Houk is murdered. In his last few minutes, he writes a note to tell Leaphorn that Eleanor is alive. Upon Leaphorn's return, Utah State Police relay this to him, and Leaphorn explains the search for the missing anthropologist.

Slick Nakai's brother describes the same site to Chee, who finds the exact location by tracking where both Elliot and Dr Friedman-Bernal submitted applications to dig, each for their own research goals. Chee learns that Elliot was not in Washington, DC the day Dr Friedman left for her weekend away; instead, he rented a helicopter... and now he's rented one again. Chee rents his own helicopter and a pilot on the spot.

Leaphorn uses Houk's rubber kayak to find Eleanor. He realizes that Brigham Houk is still alive, living in the wild with the help of his father. Soon after finding Many Ruins Canyon, Leaphorn climbs up the rocks and meets Brigham, who has been expecting him. Brigham shows him the wounded Eleanor, pushed down a cliff by the bad man; she is unconscious and feverish. Brigham agrees to bring her out for medical help.

Then Elliot shows up and confesses his crimes, including three murders and one attempted. He reported Eleanor for pot-hunting, hoping to free up the site for research sooner. He holds Eleanor's gun on Leaphorn. Brigham gets his bow and kills Elliot with an arrow. Within minutes, the helicopter arrives with Chee. Leaphorn asks Chee what he saw. Chee tells him he saw Elliot's corpse and a glimpse of another man slipping away. Leaphorn asks him not to mention any of it for now.

Leaphorn is impressed with Chee's work. Elliot's body will be found after the animals have gotten to it. In the end, Leaphorn decides not to retire. Instead, he plans to stay and meet Brigham at the next full moon to tell him of his father's death. He asks Chee to arrange a Blessing Way ceremony for him.

== Awards ==
The novel received significant attention when it was released, resulting in a number of award nominations in the "Best Novel" category. A Thief of Time won the 1989 Macavity Award and was nominated for both the 1989 Anthony Award and the 1989 Edgar Award in this category.

== Reviews ==
Emily Clements, in a 2012 essay, wrote: "One of Tony Hillerman's strengths as a writer is his ability to make what would otherwise appear to be a foreign culture seem familiar".

Kirkus Reviews finds this novel "less absorbing" than other works by Hillerman, but "ultimately powerful".

Mark Harris writing in the Chicago Tribune observes that "When a novel of mystery rises above its mere classification-"mystery"- and becomes a fine literary work it offers that dimension of atmosphere Maugham mentions ... In this case, it is the sense the author imparts of the sparseness, the spaciousness, the silence, the poverty and the ancient sullen Indian presence in this haunted wild country where the action occurs."

== Reference in other novels ==
Spider Woman's Daughter, a 2013 novel by Anne Hillerman (Tony Hillerman's daughter), is a sequel to this novel's plot. It brings back Leaphorn and Chee, and several of the supporting characters from A Thief of Time. It explores a case developed from the first novel's loose ends.

== Adaptations ==
In 2004 it was adapted as a TV film by PBS starring Adam Beach as Chee, Wes Studi as Leaphorn and Gary Farmer as Capt. Largo. It also featured Graham Greene, Sheila Tousey, and Peter Fonda. It aired on PBS's Mystery! series.

== Sources ==
- Linford, Laurance D. (2011). "Index of Places by Hillerman Title". Tony Hillerman's Navajoland: Hideouts, Haunts, and Havens in the Joe Leaphorn and Jim Chee Mysteries. University of Utah Press. ISBN 978-1-60781-988-2 – via Project MUSE.
