= List of places in Arizona (B) =

This is a list of cities, towns, unincorporated communities, counties, and other places in the U.S. state of Arizona, which start with the letter B. This list is derived from the Geographic Names Information System, which has numerous errors, so it also includes many ghost towns and historical places that are not necessarily communities or actual populated places. This list also includes information on the number and names of counties in which the place lies, its lower and upper ZIP code bounds, if applicable, its U.S. Geological Survey (USGS) reference number(s) (called the GNIS), class as designated by the USGS, and incorporated community located in (if applicable).

== B ==
| Name of place | Number of counties | Principal county | GNIS #(s) | Class | Located in | ZIP code | |
| Name of place | Number of counties | Principal county | GNIS #(s) | Class | Located in | Lower | Upper |
|---|---|---|---|---|---|---|---|
| Baby Rocks | 1 | Navajo County | 25314 | Populated Place | | 86033 | |
| Bacavi | 1 | Navajo County | 929 | Populated Place | Hotevilla-Bacavi | 86030 | |
| Bagdad | 1 | Yavapai County | 2407792 | CDP | | 86321 | |
| Bakerville | 1 | Cochise County | 971 | Populated Place | Bisbee | 85603 | |
| Bapchule | 1 | Pinal County | 1006 | Populated Place | | 85221 | |
| Barkerville | 1 | Pinal County | 24316 | Populated Place | | | |
| Bear Flat | 1 | Gila County | 2582735 | CDP | | | |
| Beardsley | 1 | Maricopa County | 1154 | Populated Place | Sun City West | 85374 | |
| Beaver Dam | 1 | Mohave County | 2582736 | CDP | | 86432 | |
| Beaver Valley | 1 | Gila County | 2582737 | CDP | | | |
| Beaver Valley Estates | 1 | Gila County | 40826 | Populated Place | | | |
| Bellemont | 1 | Coconino County | 26201 | Populated Place | | 86015 | |
| Bellevue | 1 | Gila County | 26203 | Populated Place | | | |
| Benson | 1 | Cochise County | 2409835 | Civil | | 85602 | |
| Beyerville | 1 | Santa Cruz County | 2582738 | CDP | | | |
| Bidahochi | 1 | Navajo County | 25315 | Populated Place | | | |
| Big Park | 1 | Yavapai County | 1866980 | Populated Place | | | |
| Big Springs | 1 | Coconino County | 1379 | Populated Place | | 86022 | |
| Bisbee | 1 | Cochise County | 2409851 | Civil | | 85603 | |
| Bitter Springs | 1 | Coconino County | 2407852 | CDP | | 86040 | |
| Black Canyon City | 1 | Yavapai County | 2407854 | CDP | | 85324 | |
| Black Diamond | 1 | Cochise County | 24324 | Populated Place | | | |
| Black Falls Crossing | 1 | Coconino County | 26386 | Populated Place | | | |
| Blackwater | 1 | Pinal County | 2407860 | CDP | | 85228 | |
| Blue | 1 | Greenlee County | 26502 | Populated Place | | 85922 | |
| Blue Gap | 1 | Apache County | 25260 | Populated Place | | | |
| Bluewater | 1 | La Paz County | 2407868 | CDP | | | |
| Bonita | 1 | Graham County | 24330 | Populated Place | | 85643 | |
| Bonita Creek Estates | 1 | Gila County | 2056532 | Populated Place | | | |
| Bouse | 1 | La Paz County | 2407894 | CDP | | 85325 | |
| Bowie | 1 | Cochise County | 2582739 | CDP | | 85605 | |
| Bradshaw City | 1 | Yavapai County | 26704 | Populated Place | | | |
| Breezy Pines | 1 | Yavapai County | 41088 | Populated Place | | | |
| Brenda | 1 | La Paz County | 2582740 | CDP | | 85348 | |
| Briggs | 1 | Cochise County | 1959 | Populated Place | Bisbee | | |
| Briggs | 1 | Yavapai County | 24336 | Populated Place | | | |
| Bryce | 1 | Graham County | 2582741 | CDP | | | |
| Buckeye | 1 | Maricopa County | 2411736 | Civil (City) | | 85326 | |
| Buena Vista | 1 | Graham County | 2129 | Populated Place | | 85546 | |
| Buenos Aires | 1 | Pima County | 24339 | Populated Place | | | |
| Bullhead City | 1 | Mohave County | 2670062 | Civil (City) | | 86430 | |
| Bumble Bee | 1 | Yavapai County | 27000 | Populated Place | | 86333 | |
| Burch | 1 | Gila County | 27013 | Populated Place | | | |
| Burnside | 1 | Apache County | 2407927 | CDP | | | |
| Burton | 1 | Navajo County | 27058 | Populated Place | | | |
| Butler | 1 | Mohave County | 2413617 | Populated Place | | | |
| Bylas | 1 | Graham County | 2582743 | CDP | | 85530 | |
