= List of fictional anthropologists =

Fictional anthropologists appear in novels, short stories, comics, movies, and radio and television series. The following list excludes characters designated as exclusively archaeologists.

== TV ==
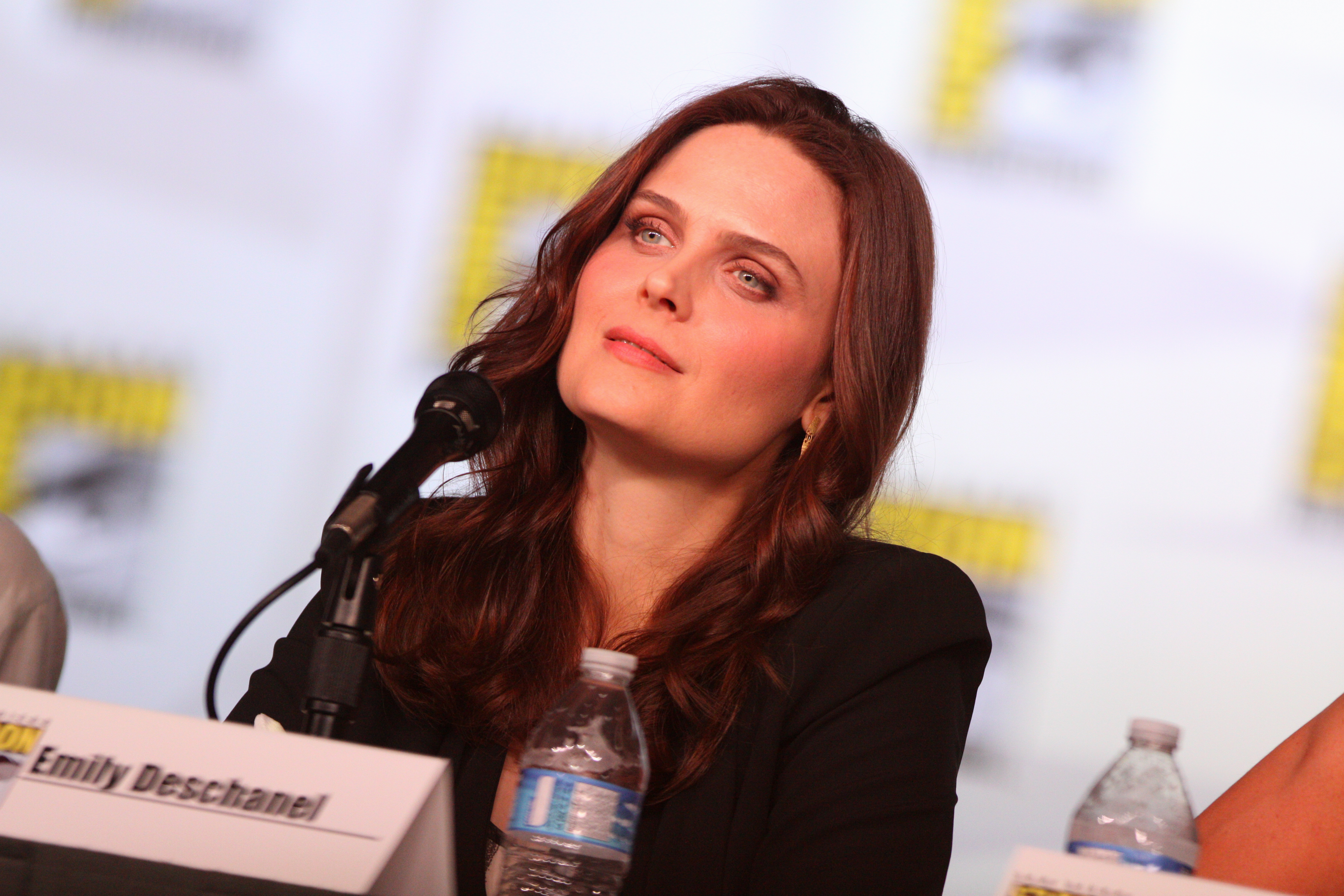
Emily Deschanel, who plays Dr. Temperance "Bones" Brennan

- In the television series, Bones:
  - Finn Abernathy, intern under Bones, played by Luke Kleintank (seasons 7–9)
  - Zack Addy, forensic anthropologist portrayed by Eric Millegan.
  - Dr. Temperance "Bones" Brennan (born Joy Keenan), played by Emily Deschanel; a protagonist of the television series, loosely based on author and forensic anthropologist Kathy Reichs.
  - Wendell Bray, intern in forensic anthropology
  - Clark Edison, forensic anthropologist
  - Colin Fisher, forensic physical anthropologist
  - Katherine Reichs, anthropologist.
  - Constance Wright, forensic anthropologist; played by real forensic scientist Kathy Reichs
  - Clark Thomas Edison, forensic physical anthropologist played by Eugene Byrd (season 3–12)
  - Dr. Douglas Filmore is a Canadian Forensic Podiatrist, a subfield of forensic anthropology in which his is the leading authority
  - Rodolfo Fuentes, forensic anthropologist from Cuba, interning under Dr. Brennan (seasons 9–12). Played by Ignacio Serricchio.
  - Arastoo Vaziri, cultural anthropologist, played by Pej Vahdat (seasons 4–12)
  - Oliver Wells, polymath
  - Daisy Wick, interning as a forensic anthropologist in Bones
- In the Star Trek universe:
  - Chakotay, played by Robert Beltran in the television series Star Trek: Voyager
  - Michael Burnham, a xenoanthropologist played by Sonequa Martin-Green in the television series Star Trek: Discovery
- Mary Albright, played by Jane Curtin in the sitcom 3rd Rock from the Sun
- June Bauer, the anthropology professor played by Betty White in the second season of Community
- Dr. Alex Blake, forensic linguist (not specified as an anthropologist) in the television series Criminal Minds
- Enoch is a Chronicom anthropologist played by Joel Stoffer in Agents of S.H.I.E.L.D.
- Alfred Hofstadter, father of Leonard Hofstadter an experimental physicist in the television series The Big Bang Theory
- Daniel Jackson, linguist and archaeologist in the 1994 science-fiction movie Stargate and the spin-off television series Stargate SG-1, played respectively by James Spader and Michael Shanks.
- Dr. Jeremiah Lasky, played by Patrick Fabian, is an Anthropology professor in the television series Saved by the Bell: The College Years
- Charlotte Lewis, played by Rebecca Mader; cultural anthropologist on the ABC television series Lost
- Uncle Martin in the television sitcom My Favorite Martian, Martian anthropologist interested in Earth culture
- Noah is a cultural anthropologist abducted by pirates in two episodes of the TV show Archer.
- Blair Sandburg, an anthropologist in The Sentinel TV series, played by Garett Maggart.
- Shulik (Sasha), protagonist in the Soviet television series The Adventures of Electronica, is an ethnographer out to study folklore. It first showed in 1979.
- Professor Zei (voiced by Raphael Sbarge), an anthropologist who appears in the second season of Avatar: The Last Airbender. He is the lead anthropologist at Ba Sing Se University, and has spent much of his life searching for the lost library of Wan Shi Tong.

== Film ==
- Sadira Adani, anthropologist and expert witness in The Exorcism of Emily Rose
- Dennis Alan, played by Bill Pullman, in the film The Serpent and the Rainbow, which is based on the non-fiction novel with the same name written by Wade Davis, a real-life Harvard anthropologist who investigates zombification in Haiti, and who Pullman plays a fictionalized version of in the film.
- Dr. Ilene Andrews, played by Rebecca Hall, is an anthropological linguist in Godzilla vs. Kong and Godzilla x Kong: The New Empire
- Louise Banks, played by Amy Adams, is a linguist in the science-fiction film Arrival.
- Lara Croft, an archaeologist in the game and film franchise Tomb Raider
- Dr. Andrew Cunningham (played by Victor French), a cultural anthropologist in the film The House on Skull Mountain
- Professor Henry Higgins, played by Rex Harrison, is a phonetics scholar in My Fair Lady
- Christian Hughes (played by Jack Reynor), a cultural anthropology graduate student who, along with another doctoral student Josh (played by William Jackson Harper) and their friends, are studying the Hårga, in Hälsingland, Sweden, for their dissertations, in the film Midsommsar.
- Dr. Henry Walton "Indiana" Jones Jr. (played by Harrison Ford), in the media franchise "Indiana Jones"
- Professor James Krippendorf (Richard Dreyfuss) is an ethnographer in Krippendorf's Tribe
- John Markway is an anthropologist who studies ghosts in The Haunting, based on Shirley Jackson's novel The Haunting of Hill House
- Jean-Charles Pommier (played by Pierce Brosnan) is a cultural anthropologist who studies nomads in Nomads
- Stanley X (played by Richard Pryor), anthropologist and drummer in the movie Wild in the Streets
- Professor Robert Sutwell (played by Bob Cummings), an anthropologist in the film Beach Party
- Milo Thatch (voiced by Michael J. Fox), linguist in the film Atlantis: The Lost Empire

== Literature ==
- Created by James Patterson:
  - Ronald Stasic, teaches at Mountain View Community College in 2nd Chance (2002).
- Created by Frank Parkin:
  - James Krippendorf in Frank Parkin's novel and the film based on this Krippendorf's Tribe
- Created by Lily King:
  - Margaret Mead, Reo Fortune and Gregory Bateson are fictionalized in Lily King's novel Euphoria (2014).
- Created by Michael Crichton:
  - Rick Chang, physical anthropologist in Michael Crichton's novel Timeline; works at an archaeological site in France
  - Jorg Erickson, "primate anatomist" who examines a talking orang in a brief appearance in the novel Next
  - Elsie Kastner, linguist and graphologist in the novel Timeline; works at an archaeological site in France run by historians
- Created by Louise Erdrich
  - Millie Cloud, decides to become an anthropologist (ethnographer) near the end of The Night Watchman
- Created by Laura Griffin:
  - Dr. Kelsey Quinn, forensic anthropologist, in Shadow Fall (2015)
- Created by Anna North:
  - Agnes, forensic anthropologist studying a bog body, in Bog Queen (2025)
- Created by Nicola Griffith
  - Marghe Taishan is an anthropologist on the planet Jeep in the SF novel Ammonite.
- Created by Richard Rhodes:
  - Robert Fuhrey, in The Last Safari; paleontologist who discovers an ancient hominid
  - John Kegedi in The Last Safari; a Tanzanian; Fuhrey's assistant, working on a site with a hominid older than any other yet discovered; teaches soil chemistry, agriculture, and paleontology, but denies that he is a paleontologist; no specific mention is made of anthropology
- Created by James Rollins:
  - Lena Crandall, in The Bone Labyrinth: geneticist from the Max Planck Institute for Evolutionary Anthropology in Leipzig, Germany
  - Elizabeth Polk, in The Last Oracle: doctoral candidate; focuses on religion, intuition and related areas
- Linda Bluenight, forensic anthropologist who goes to teach Papago children on a reservation in Arizona in the book Mission to Sonora by Rebecca Cramer
- Louisa Bourebonette, anthropologist in Anne Hillerman's 2013 novel Spider Woman's Daughter
- Elenore Smith Bowen, slightly fictionalized ethnographer in Africa around the 1940s, based on the author's own fieldwork in Nigeria in the late 1940s and early 1950s, in the novel Return to Laughter by Laura Bohannon, writing as Elenore Smith Bowen
- Temperance "Tempe" Brennan, forensic anthropologist in novel series Temperance Brennan by Kathy Reichs
- Tory Brennan, great-niece of Tempe Brennan in the Virals series by Kathy Reichs and her son Brendan Reichs
- Bill Brockton, a forensic anthropologist in the Body Farm Novel series by "Jefferson Bass," the nom de plume of the writing pair William M. Bass and Jon Jefferson
- Wiggs Dannyboy, in Jitterbug Perfume by Tom Robbins
- Nelson Denoon, of the novel Mating (1992) by Norman Rush, anthropologist and cult founder in Botswana
- Garnet DeWinter, forensic anthropologist in J.D. Robb's Concealed in Death
- Gregory Eyck, post-modernist anthropologist at the University of the Midwest in Publish and Perish: Three Tales of Tenure and Terror by James Hynes
- Callum Hearne is a cultural anthropologist who did research in Mexico in the backstory to The Anthropologist's Daughter by Vanessa Furse Jackson. The novel's first-person protagonist, Immogen is an anthropology student.
- Frank Holliwell, anthropologist in the political thriller A Flag for Sunrise by Robert Stone
- Aric Hort, anthropologist (ethnographer) on the planet Langri in Lloyd Biggle, Jr.'s 1974 science-fiction novel Monument
- Johnathan, graduate student in anthropology, starts a new life on the Faeroe Islands in the novel Far Afield by Susanna Kaysen
- Lasher, an Episcopal minister with an M.A. in anthropology, and the leader of a rebel group known as the "Ghost Shirt Society" Kurt Vonnegut's novel Player Piano
- Domenica Macdonald, anthropologist; the creation of Alexander McCall Smith, in his 44 Scotland Street series, including Lover over Scotland, Anchor Books, 2006
- Elizabeth MacPherson, forensic anthropologist, is the protagonist of the Elizabeth MacPherson series by Sharyn McCrumb
- Don Maddson, linguist in James P. Hogan's Giant's Star (not specifically called an anthropologist), given the task of learning and translating the Ganymedeans' language
- John Montagu is an anthropologist interested in the supernatural in Shirley Jackson's novel, The Haunting of Hill House, which was the basis of the movie The Haunting.
- Julie Norman is a cultural anthropologist who investigates unexplained deaths of senior citizens in Florida's Gold Coast the novel Assisted Dying: An Ethnographic Murder Mystery on Florida's Gold Coast and the novel about Indian-Americans, The Gift of a Bride: A Tale of Anthropology, Matrimony and Murder, both by Serena Nanda and Joan Gregg.
- Gideon Oliver, 'the skeleton detective,' protagonist of 18 novels by Aaron Elkins
- Dr. Ann Pearlmutter in James Patterson's Women's Murder Club series of novels, a marginal character who works at University of California, San Diego, specializing in body ID and facial reconstruction
- W.H.R. Rivers, fictional version of the real anthropologist of the same name, in Regeneration by Pat Barker; treats shell-shocked soldiers so they can be sent back to the front in the brutal First World War
- Finley Scott is a forensic anthropologist in Dani Pettrey's novel Cold Shot (Chesapeake Valor).
- Dan Sherman, anthropology instructor whose attempt at problem-based learning is problem-filled
- Grant Thornton, anthropologist and major love interest in Africa, in A Touch of Betrayal: Treasures of the Heart #3 by Catherine Palmer
- Martiya van der Leun, anthropologist in the murder mystery Fieldwork by Mischa Berlinski
- Bud Warhol, forensic anthropologist in Tantric Zoo and other Bud Warhol mysteries by Rob Loughran
- The unnamed female narrator of the novel Mating (1992) by Norman Rush; graduate student of anthropology
- Olivia is a minor character in The Rosie Project by Graeme Simsion, 2013.
- Unnamed team of ethnologists and graduate students mentioned in the science-fiction novel Ports of Call by Jack Vance. On the planet Terce, they were eaten by the Uche or skinned by the Shuja.

== Comics ==
- Kagura, character from the anime and manga series Azumanga Daioh; also makes a cameo appearance as an anthropologist in Classroom of Thesis; From the Report to the Graduation Thesis (論文の教室[レポートから卒論まで]?) by Kazuhisa Todayama
- Hawkman (Carter Hall), a character in the DC Comics universe.
- Bolivar Trask, a supervillain in the Marvel Comics universe

== Other ==
- Claire DeLoone, anthropologist at New York's American Museum of Natural History, one of the three female leads in the 1944 Broadway musical-comedy On the Town; the role was originated by Betty Comden, who co-wrote the book.
- Professor Edward Travers, played by Jack Watling, anthropologist and explorer who appears in two serials of the BBC television series Doctor Who
- Korekiyo Shinguji, voice acted by Kenichi Suzumura in the Japanese dub and by Todd Haberkorn in the English dub, is titled The Ultimate Anthropologist in Danganronpa V3: Killing Harmony.
