= The Shape Shifter =

2006 novel by Tony Hillerman

- First edition cover
- Author: Tony Hillerman
- Cover artist: Peter Thorpe
- Language: English
- Series: Joe Leaphorn/Jim Chee Navajo Tribal Police Series
- Genre: Detective fiction
- Set in: Navajo Nation and Hopi Reservation in Southwestern United States
- Published: 2006 HarperCollins
- Publication place: USA
- Media type: Print and audio
- Pages: 276
- Awards: Spur Award for Best Western Short Novel in 2007
- ISBN: 0-06-056345-1
- OCLC: 61264361
- Preceded by: Skeleton Man (2004)
- Followed by: Spider Woman's Daughter (written by Anne Hillerman; 2013)

The Shape Shifter is a crime novel by American writer Tony Hillerman, the eighteenth in the Joe Leaphorn/Jim Chee Navajo Tribal Police series, first published in 2006. It was a New York Times best-seller and the last Chee/Leaphorn novel by Hillerman published before Hillerman's death on October 26, 2008.

A cold case from Lt. Leaphorn's earliest days as a police officer finds new evidence, which he pursues though he is retired. The slick and cruel perpetrator continues his same modus operandi, but Leaphorn gets evidence on this elusive murderer and thief, leading to a dangerous final encounter. The story ties the 1860s forced Long Walk of the Navajo, US operations in Vietnam in the 1960s and 1970s, Navajo beliefs of greed as the main evil, and the concept of skinwalker or shape shifter in a 21st-century tale.

== Plot summary ==
While Jim Chee and Bernadette Manuelito honeymoon in Hawaii, Mel Bork sends Leaphorn a page from a glossy magazine, showing the interior of a fine home. The main item on the wall is a tale-telling rug made in the 1860s of the long walk back from Bosque Redondo, which is called the Woven Sorrow Rug. Leaphorn saw that rare rug long ago in Totter's Trading Post & Gallery, which burned down in 1965. Besides destroying the rug, that fire killed a man beyond recognition, who was identified by the FBI as Ray Shewnack, a man on their most-wanted list. Leaphorn calls Bork, learning from his wife that Mel has not been home for two days. There is a threatening message from a stranger that Mel never heard. Leaphorn begins to search for Mel. The rug would be nearly impossible to duplicate, raising the suspicion that the rug was not destroyed, as reported decades earlier. Leaphorn recalls how he was diverted from aiding Grandma Peshlakai, whose entire collection of pinyon sap for making baskets had been stolen from her, and her granddaughter saw the car driving away with it. Leaphorn's boss had sent him to join the FBI at Totter's place instead. She was very angry with him.

Leaphorn learns that Jason Delos owns the house shown in the magazine photo. Gossip links Delos to stories of CIA in Vietnam in the 1960s. Leaphorn calls Sgt. Garcia, who tells him the story of Ray Shewnack and his burglary of Handy's gas station and grocery back in 1961. Shewnack told one plan to the employees (Ellie, Begay and Delonie), then carried it out differently, murdering the owners and setting up the employees to go to prison for abetting, while he drove away with the money. Begay is dead, apparently of suicide. Garcia tells this story as they drive to the remains of Totter's place. They meet Delonie there, recently out of prison. Heading home, they stop at Grandma Peshlakai's place, learning that she found her empty buckets at Totter's place after the fire. A few years after the fire, she heard Totter had died, via a notice in a Gallup newspaper.

Back home, Chee and Bernie agree to find this death notice. The notice of Totter's death in 1967 said he was buried in the VA cemetery in Oklahoma. Leaphorn visits Jason Delos, asking for help in finding Mel Bork. Delos admits that Bork had visited him, suggesting that there might be insurance fraud as to the antique rug. Delos's man, Tommy Vang, gives Leaphorn a bag of food including homemade fruitcake, to take on his long drive home, but Leaphorn does not eat any of it. At home, he hears the news of the man killed in a vehicle crash two days earlier. He calls Garcia, certain it was Bork, and says that an autopsy will be needed. Then Leaphorn meets with Ted Rostic, retired FBI agent, who had been part of the 1965 case. Shewnack was known as George Perkins in the CIA in the early 1960s, matching the gossip attached to Delos; Perkins's way of operating in Vietnam matches how Shewnack operated in his crimes. He never left physical evidence of himself at any crime scene, nor did he leave any witnesses who saw his face. The identification at Totter's was determined by the FBI circumstantially. Leaphorn has theories, also with no evidence. His notion now is that the stolen pinyon sap, so common in the area, was used as the fire accelerant at Totter's place, not considered as such by the investigators.

In Crownpoint, Leaphorn learns that Delos will put his antique rug up for sale. The autopsy of Bork reveals a potent, fast-acting, ingested rat poison, one now regulated, is what killed him. The pathologist says the poison could have been put in a maraschino cherry. After that cell phone call, Leaphorn sees Tommy Vang searching his pick-up truck, holding the sack of food. Vang tells Leaphorn his story with Delos, since his childhood in Laos. Vang's next errand is to find Delonie, take pictures of him and leave him a jar of maraschino cherries. Vang will get lost rejoining Delos with the maps he has, so Leaphorn joins him. Vang wants to go back home to find his people. Delos did not do well by Vang. Vang realizes that Delos has used those cherries more than once to kill people. As they drive, Rostic's friend calls Leaphorn to say that Totter was not in the hospital nor buried in a VA cemetery, which means he is not dead. Leaphorn tells Vang of the Handy crime and how Delonie is someone who can recognize Shewnack. Leaphorn makes clear that Delos has the same fate planned for Vang as for Delonie. The three of them go to the elk-hunting ranch past Dulce, New Mexico, so Delonie can identify Delos as Shewnack. They see a hole dug the size of a grave. Before dawn, Delos approaches Vang in his truck while Delonie watches with Leaphorn. All four come together; Delos shoots Delonie, who falls. Delos tells everyone what to do. He instructs Vang to shoot Delonie again. Instead, Vang kills Delos. Leaphorn thanks him for saving their lives. They tend to Delonie's wound, and then bury Delos and his personal effects in the grave. They find a huge amount of cash in his bags, and give most of it to Vang as back wages. They find a clinic for Delonie in Dulce. Vang and Leaphorn drive to Crownpoint, for Leaphorn's pick-up truck. Vang leaves, getting happier by the minute as he can go home.

Leaphorn visits the Chees, telling them some of the story. He will tell them what happened to Delos in a year, if nothing bad arises before then. He gets them to think about the Navajo concept of the shape shifter who stole pinyon sap from Grandma Peshlakai. He does tell them how he repaid her for the long ago theft.

== Characters ==
- Joe Leaphorn: Retired lieutenant from the Navaho Tribal Police, widowed. He lives in Window Rock, Arizona.
- Jim Chee: Sergeant in the Navajo Tribal Police and recently married. He lives in Shiprock, New Mexico.
- Bernadette Manuelito: Formerly a federal Customs Patrol Officer and previously an officer in the Navajo Tribal Police; she is now wife of Jim Chee and soon to resume as an officer in the NTP.
- Captain Largo: Chee's superior officer, and whose view of the FBI is well-remembered by Rostic.
- Louisa Bourebonette: Professor of cultural anthropology with a special interest in origin stories of the tribes around Northern Arizona University. She is Leaphorn's close friend, who uses Leaphorn's spare room as the base for her dispersed interviews. Introduced in Coyote Waits.
- Mel Bork: Private investigator, former Arizona police officer, and long before, with Leaphorn in FBI school. He is killed in car accident after visiting Jason Delos.
- Grace Bork: Wife of Mel, awaiting his return home.
- Gerald Tarkington: Gallery owner in Flagstaff who shares Delos name with Bork, and then with Leaphorn.
- Grandma Peshlakai: Victim of theft of carefully collected piñon sap in 1965 for making baskets. She recovered the empty containers at Totter's place after the fire.
- Elandra: Granddaughter who saw the car driving away with the piñon sap.
- Erwin James Totter: Owner of Totter's Trading Post & Gallery near Tohatchi, New Mexico, long ago destroyed by fire. A Gallup newspaper printed a poorly documented obituary of his death in Oklahoma City. Born in 1939 in Ada, OK. In autumn 1965, his Trading Post was burned down.
- Ray Shewnack: Committed 1961 burglary and murders in Coconino County and other places, putting him in the most-wanted list by the FBI. Presumed killed by the fire in Totter's Trading Post & Gallery in 1965.
- Mr. and Mrs. Handy: Owned a service station/grocery store/trading post at Chinli junction. Murdered in cold blood by Shewnack in a 1961 robbery.
- Ellie McFee: Employee at Handy's who expected Shewnack to marry her after the theft of the monthly take. She was left standing along the road waiting for him, met by the young Garcia and another officer instead. She served her time in prison, but is dead by the time Delonie appears in the story.
- Benny Begay: Stock boy at Handy's place. He kept phone lines out of service for about ten minutes, to delay the call to the police. Out on parole when Shewnack was burned to death. Made a life for himself after his sentence. Killed in gun-cleaning accident, one which Leaphorn doubts. He suspects Begay was murdered.
- Tomas Delonie: The outside man during the Handy burglary, armed so no one would interfere in the crime. Afterward, he drove himself and Begay to a meeting place to get their share of the take. Instead, Shewnack called them in to the police. He got the longest sentence, and is released during the story. He is Seminole, Potawatomi, and partly of French ancestry and loves to feed the birds.
- Kelly Garcia: Police sergeant in the Coconino County sheriff's department in Flagstaff.
- Roger Saunders: Pathologist for Flagstaff police who agrees to test for the true cause of Bork's death.
- Octavius Burlander: Navajo rug expert at the periodic sale in Crownpoint, New Mexico, who shares information with Leaphorn.
- Jason Delos: Wealthy man in Flagstaff, Arizona who owns the Navajo tale-teller rug supposed to have been burned in 1965 fire at Totter's Gallery, about 70 years old. Rumored to have been in the CIA in the 1960s. A man who divides humanity into predators and prey, and he is a predator. The shape shifter of so many identities, including Totter and Shewnack.
- Tommy Vang: Middle-aged Hmong man who lives with Delos, as a sort of butler. His family was in Laos, wiped out during the Vietnam War, and Delos, known to him initially as Colonel Perkins, brought him to the US after the fall of Saigon.
- Ted Rostic: Retired FBI agent, investigator at Totter's Trading Post in 1965, lives in Crownpoint, New Mexico at time of story. He worked with Leaphorn in Coyote Waits, as well as on the 1965 case.

== Series continuity and story structure ==
This novel continues directly after Skeleton Man, in that the engaged couple, Chee and Manuelito, are now married and just back from their honeymoon. Leaphorn is retired, but oddly refers to being retired just a month (Chapters 6, 7, 10, 11), when he has been retired since the twelfth novel in the series, The Fallen Man. He continues to miss his late wife Emma, who died between Skinwalkers and A Thief of Time, the seventh and eight novels in the series. He finds companionship with Louisa Bourebonette, and once again asks her about them getting married. She does not want to ruin a good friendship, and Leaphorn is at peace with that (Chapter 14).

The story is told in flashback to Chee and Manuelito (Chapters 1 and 2, and 24). They do not hear all of the story, as Leaphorn fears that as both are sworn officers, they ought not to learn some of the facts from him, a civilian. They do some legwork for him, but this is mainly his story. Leaphorn promises to tell them the whole story on their first wedding anniversary if nothing arises to gain the attention of the law (Chapter 24). The reader gets the whole story from Leaphorn.

== Allusions to history and real places ==
As the antique rug at the center of the plot was made in the 1860s by women walking back from Bosque Redondo in the Long Walk of the Navajo, much of the story of that sad part of Navajo history is told in the story. The history of conflicts in the Navajo homelands, the Navajo Wars, in particular the conflicts leading up to the Long Walk is discussed by Leaphorn as action of the novel progresses.

Reference is made to the return point Fort Defiance, Arizona, and to Fort Sumner, the fort near Bosque Redondo where the Navajos were forced to live for several years with members of an enemy tribe.

The history of the US and specifically the CIA in Vietnam in the 1960s and 1970s is part of the history of two major characters of the novel. Delos was associated with the CIA as Colonel Perkins, but skimmed money in transactions in which he took part during the Kennedy years, causing his rejection by the CIA, and providing him time to return to the US to make his living by crimes. Tommy Vang was born in that era, part of the Hmong displaced to Vietnam, who left as a child with Perkins / Delos after the Fall of Saigon in 1975.

Much of the story takes place in Flagstaff, Arizona, where Sgt. Kelly Garcia is based and the experts in Navajo rugs and ancient artifacts have their place of business. The home of Delos is in the mountains outside Flagstaff. Leaphorn lives in Window Rock, Arizona. Jim Chee and his wife Bernadette Manuelito live in Shiprock, New Mexico in Jim's old trailer home, fixed up by Bernie, and where Leaphorn visits them. Leaphorn meets a rug expert, and then Tommy Vang, in Crownpoint, New Mexico. Dulce, New Mexico is a stopping point near Delonie's home and where he is left in the clinic, part of the Jicarilla Apache reservation.

== Geography ==
In his 2011 book Tony Hillerman's Navajoland: Hideouts, Haunts, and Havens in the Joe Leaphorn and Jim Chee Mysteries, author Laurance D. Linford has listed the following 73 geographical locations, real and fictional, mentioned in The Shape Shifter.

1. Albuquerque, New Mexico
2. Archuleta Mesa New Mexico
3. Beautiful Valley, Arizona
4. Bidahochi, Arizona
5. Bis-E ah Wash, Arizona
6. Bosque Redondo, New Mexico
7. Budville, New Mexico
8. Cabezon Peak, New Mexico
9. Canyon de Chelly, Arizona
10. Carrizo Mountains, Arizona
11. Chaco Mesa, New Mexico
12. Chalk Mountains, Colorado
13. Chimney Butte, Arizona
14. Chinle, Arizona
15. Coconino County, Arizona
16. Cornfields, Arizona
17. Coyote Canyon, New Mexico
18. Crownpoint, New Mexico
19. Cuba, New Mexico
20. Dead Man’s Peak, New Mexico
21. Defiance Plateau in Arizona
22. Dilkon, Arizona
23. Dulce, New Mexico
24. Edith, New Mexico
25. Farmington, New Mexico
26. Flagstaff, Arizona
27. Four Corners, where New Mexico, Arizona, Utah, and Colorado meet
28. Gallup, New Mexico
29. Ganado, Arizona
30. Gobernador, New Mexico
31. Holbrook, Arizona
32. Humphreys Peak, Arizona
33. Jicarilla Apache Reservation, New Mexico
34. Kayenta, Arizona
35. Los Gigantes, Arizona
36. Lower Greasewood, Arizona
37. Lukachukai, Arizona
38. Lukachukai Mountains in Arizona
39. Lumberton, New Mexico
40. Mexican Hat, Utah
41. Mount Humphreys, Arizona
42. Mount Taylor (New Mexico)
43. Navajo-Hopi Joint Use Area, Arizona
44. New Lands Chapter, Arizona
45. Pecos River, New Mexico
46. Phoenix, Arizona
47. Pueblo Pintado, New Mexico
48. Rio Grande River in Colorado, New Mexico, Texas, and Mexico
49. Round Rock, Arizona
50. St. Michaels, Arizona
51. San Francisco Peaks in Arizona
52. San Juan County, Colorado
53. San Juan Mountains in Colorado
54. San Juan River, in Colorado, New Mexico, and Utah
55. San Pedro Mountains in New Mexico
56. Sanders, Arizona
57. Santa Fe, New Mexico
58. Shiprock, New Mexico
59. Southern Ute Indian Reservation, Colorado
60. Standing Rock, New Mexico
61. Stinking Lake, New Mexico
62. Teec Nos Pos, Arizona
63. Tes Nez Iha, Arizona
64. Torreon, New Mexico (Note: There are two places in New Mexico called Torreon - Torreon, Sandoval County, New Mexico and Torreon, Torrance County, New Mexico. It is currently unknown which one is mentioned in The Shape Shifter, due to lack of access to the novel itself.)
65. Totter Trading Post (fictitious location)
66. Tuba City, Arizona
67. Twin Lakes, New Mexico
68. Two Story Trading Post, Arizona
69. Ute Mountain, Colorado
70. Whitehorse (Lake), New Mexico
71. Window Rock, Arizona
72. Winslow, Arizona
73. Yah-ta-hey, New Mexico

== Reviews and awards ==
Marilyn Stasio, writing in The New York Times, finds that "Like all the great storytellers, from Homer on down, Tony Hillerman knows that every dark and twisted tale of murder can be traced back to its mythic origins. ... Hillerman’s lyrical novel is as much about recovering these lost legends — and the existential purpose they offer an aging hero in recoil from “the retirement world” — as it is about bringing a criminal to justice. So there's real poignancy in Leaphorn's efforts to track down an antique rug woven to commemorate “all the dying, humiliation and misery” on the Navajo nation's “Long Walk” home from an Army concentration camp in the 1860s."

Irene Wanner, writing in the Los Angeles Times, says "The central image of changing identity -- of shifting shapes -- . . . leads to philosophical discussions between Leaphorn and those he encounters." Leaphorn, in his response to the letter from his friend Bork, is "launching a story that goes far beyond solving a whodunit." She feels this story will be "another of his [Hillerman's] books likely to cross over from the mystery genre to find wide general popularity."

Kirkus Reviews says there is not much mystery in this novel but Hillerman's warmth is undiminished, and notes that Jim Chee and his wife Bernadette Manuelito are present but in the background.

Publishers Weekly finds the conclusion is sure to startle readers of this acclaimed mystery series, in contrast to what Kirkus Reviews finds, and that the author has "masterfully connect[ed] such disparate elements as an ancient cursed weaving, two stolen buckets of piñon sap and the Vietnam War" in this hunt for a soulless killer.

The novel received the award for Best Western Short Novel in 2007, awarded by the Western Writers of America, which "annually honors writers for distinguished writing about the American West".

== Sources ==
- Linford, Laurance D. (2011). "Index of Places by Hillerman Title". Tony Hillerman's Navajoland: Hideouts, Haunts, and Havens in the Joe Leaphorn and Jim Chee Mysteries. University of Utah Press. ISBN 978-1-60781-988-2 – via Project MUSE.
