= Talking God =

1989 novel by Tony Hillerman

- First edition cover
- Author: Tony Hillerman
- Cover artist: Peter Thorpe
- Language: English
- Series: Joe Leaphorn/Jim Chee Navajo Tribal Police Series
- Genre: Detective fiction
- Set in: Navajo Nation and Washington, D.C.
- Published: 1989 Harper & Row
- Publication place: USA
- Media type: Print and audio
- Pages: 239
- ISBN: 0-06-016118-3
- OCLC: 19518501
- Preceded by: A Thief of Time (1988)
- Followed by: Coyote Waits (1990)

Talking God is a crime novel by American writer Tony Hillerman, the ninth in the Joe Leaphorn/Jim Chee Navajo Tribal Police series, published in 1989.

One murdered man near Gallup and the desecration of a Northeastern cemetery, protesting ineffectively the keeping of native American bones in the Smithsonian, lead Leaphorn and Chee, separately, to Washington D.C. to solve interlinked crimes and preserve Navajo cultural artifacts.

== Plot summary ==
An unidentified man is found dead along the railroad tracks near Gallup, New Mexico. There is a note in one pocket of his suit referring to Agnes Tsotsie and a Yeibichai or Night Chant ceremony. FBI agent Kennedy calls on Lt. Leaphorn to aid in finding footprints near the body. There are no footprints to follow, but the note sends him to interview Agnes Tsotsie, who shows him the letter from Henry Highhawk, who will attend her Night Chant. Always curious, Leaphorn learns that an Amtrak train made an emergency stop in the desert, the likely explanation for the body found near the railroad tracks with no footprints around him. The man's left-behind luggage is now stored in Washington D.C. Leaphorn takes his vacation in Washington D.C. to follow up on Pointed Shoes. Leaphorn talks with Roland Dockery and Peres of Amtrak, who show him the luggage, which holds a useful notebook. Peres saw the man now known to be the killer of Pointed Toes. The notebook includes the name and prescription number for a medicine he took, revealing both the name and address of Elogio Santillanes. Leaphorn proceeds to inform the next of kin, who are rather quiet in receiving the news. He then notices that their next door neighbor matches the description of the killer. As Santillanes was tortured, Leaphorn suspects the family home might be bugged, so leaves them with the sad news. Leaphorn calls Kennedy to match fingerprints under the victim's proper name. Leaphorn calls the NTP, learning that Chee was arresting officer for Highhawk and is now in D.C.

An arrest warrant is issued for Henry Highhawk, who stole human remains from a New England cemetery and then crossed state lines. Highhawk is attending a Night Chant ceremony on the Navajo Reservation, where Jim Chee arrests him with aid from his friend Cowboy Dashee, for the FBI. Chee sees the masks that are integral to the last day of the ceremony. Chee gets a letter from Mary Landon, his longtime love, saying he should not come to Wisconsin; they cannot resolve the cultural barrier between them. Minutes later, his friend Janet Pete calls him from Washington, D.C. Her newest client is Henry Highhawk, and she is afraid on several counts. Chee leaves to visit her, meeting Highhawk and Rudolfo Gomez on his first night in town. Pete points out the man she thinks is following her. Chee confronts him and he drives off. Chee visits Highhawk at his office in the museum, seeing the accurate detail of an upcoming exhibit on Masked Gods of the Americas, including the Navajo Talking God mask. Highhawk takes a phone call, telling Chee he will be back shortly. Chee leaves when Highhawk does not return, walking out past an unguarded exit.

The next morning, Leaphorn goes to Chee's hotel, updating each other on why they came to Washington. They realize that both Gomez and Santelleros were tortured in Chile, must be leftists in exile, and are still hunted. Leaphorn calls his friend Captain Rodney, who joins them. Rodney knows Chee's name as having signed into the museum the night before, but not out. Rodney tells them of the murder of Mrs. Yokum, the guard. The three men find Highhawk's body in a museum storage bin, after Chee has maintenance look for something out of place as the guide to the emptied bin. They find Highhawk's tape recorder wired to his watch, and a replica Talking God mask. Leaphorn and Chee figure out why Gomez /Santerro sought a connection with Highhawk, and the danger of the proximity of Highhawk's exhibit to the Incan exhibit.

The Chileans will not pay Leroy Fleck, their hired assassin, because the victim is identified. Fleck's revenge is to kill as many Chileans as he can, trailing them to the exhibit of Incan masks in the Natural History Museum with a high ranking general from the present rightist government, the same goal that brings Santerro. The Inca exhibit draws media coverage when the Chileans arrive. The Chilean leftists want to kill the rightists in Washington, and used Highhawk to set up the explosives. Tensions mount as Chee pulls apart the exhibit to find the plastic explosives packed under the mask, and Leaphorn kicks apart the remote detonator that falls from Santerro's hands. Fleck is shot twice by the Chilean body guard in the museum, after he kills the general and The Client with his shank, a very sharp tool.

Leaphorn heads right back to Window Rock. The police tell Chee that Highhawk was found dead, killed by Santerro, who escaped. Chee finds a Tano Pueblo fetish in the trunk of Highhawk's car, and gives it to Janet Pete to return it to the Tano people, who are connected to her law firm. Mary Landon calls Chee, glad to hear him alive, but they end their relationship. Chee heads home.

== Characters ==
At Navajo Nation and in Washington D.C.

- Joe Leaphorn: Lieutenant in the Navajo Tribal Police (NTP) at the Window Rock, Arizona, past 50 years old, widowed one year earlier, decided to continue his police work.
- Jim Chee: Officer in the Navajo Tribal Police at the Shiprock, New Mexico office, under Capt. Largo. He is about 30, and has trained to be a hatahalii. He has done the Blessing Way for a few people, including Joe Leaphorn.
- Henry Highhawk: Employed as conservator in a Smithsonian museum in Washington, D.C. He dug up graves in New England then crossed state lines after arrest warrant issued. His maternal grandmother was a Navajo, and he claims to be Navajo on her account. Blond haired, tall man, an off kilter idealist.
- Rudolfo Gomez: Man at Night Way ceremony for Agnes Tsotsie, who seeks out Highhawk. Chee calls him Bad Hands, for evidence of fingers missing under his gloves. Known as Miguel Santerro to Fleck and The Client. Part of Chile's left wing opposition in exile.

Navajo Nation or nearby

- Jay Kennedy: FBI agent for Gallup, New Mexico area.
- Bernard St. Germane: Works for major railroad, longtime friend of Leaphorn, his source for information on the Amtrak train.
- Elogio Santillanes: Man found dead along the railroad tracks in New Mexico, first called Pointed Shoes, for lack of identification on his person. In life, he was part of the leftist opposition in exile from Chile.
- Agnes Tsosie: Navajo elder who is dying of cancer, and has a Night Way or Yeibichai ceremony, a nine-day event, so she can die in peace.
- 'Cowboy' Albert Dashee, Jr: Hopi man, works as one of the deputies for Coconino County Sheriff’s office in Arizona. He accompanies Chee to the Night Way ceremony, to aid in the arrest.

Washington D.C.

- Leroy Fleck: Short but strong middle-aged man, with curly red hair, he is a law breaker and murderer from his childhood. He is tracking Santerro for The Client.
- Mrs. Fleck: Mama to Leroy, now old and violent, and the motivation for Leroy to earn the money promised by the client.
- Eddie Elkins: A disbarred lawyer and Fleck's contact for the job with The Client, and who receives the tapes recording the Santillanes family next door to Fleck's apartment. They met in prison, decades earlier, when young Fleck had been raped. Elkins taught him how get his own revenge.
- The Client: Man who hires Fleck to murder seven people, one by one, for a fee. He will not pay unless each murder goes undetected for a full month. He is part of the Chilean embassy.
- P. J. Rodney: Captain in D.C. police and old friend of Leaphorn. They met at the FBI academy early in their careers and now work together.
- Peres: Amtrak employee interviewed by Leaphorn in Washington D.C., who describes Fleck as the man in Santillanes's train compartment near Gallup, and who packed up Santillanes's belongings when the man disappeared from the train.
- Janet Pete: Formerly a legal aid lawyer for the Navajo Tribal Council, where she met her good friend Chee. She moved to Washington D.C. to work for her former law school professor McDermott who is also her lover. She is the attorney for Highhawk. Pete is half-Navajo.
- Mary Landon: Chee's longtime love, now living in Wisconsin. She is not Navajo, and neither can bend to the other one's culture and give up their own. She calls Chee in Washington, after seeing him on the news, and they end their connection.
- Dr. Caroline Hartman: Curator of the exhibit in the Natural History Museum on Masked Gods of the Americas.
- Mrs. Alice Yokum: Guard at 12th Street entrance to Smithsonian building, killed by Gomez /Santerro.
- General Ramon Huerta: High official of the secret police in Chile's government under rightist Pinochet, in Washington D.C. for an official visit.

== Geography ==
In his 2011 book Tony Hillerman's Navajoland: Hideouts, Haunts, and Havens in the Joe Leaphorn and Jim Chee Mysteries, author Laurance D. Linford has listed the following 29 geographical locations, real and fictional, mentioned in Talking God.

1. Baby Rocks, AZ
2. Bidahochi, AZ
3. Burnt Water, AZ
4. Chuska Mountains, NM & AZ
5. Crownpoint, NM
6. Defiance Plateau, AZ
7. Farmington, NM
8. Fort Defiance, AZ
9. Fort Wingate, NM
10. Gallup, NM
11. Ganado, AZ
12. Hopi Buttes, AZ
13. Iyanbito Mesa, NM
14. Joint Use Reservation, AZ
15. Lower Greasewood, AZ
16. Many Farms, AZ
17. Na Ah Tee (Trading Post), AZ
18. Naschitti Trading Post, NM
19. Nashodishgish (Nahodishgish) Mesa, NM
20. Navajo Mountain, UT & AZ
21. Painted Desert, AZ
22. San Juan River, CO, NM, & UT
23. Shiprock (Community), NM
24. Tesihim Butte, AZ
25. Whippoorwill (Spring), AZ
26. White Cone, AZ
27. Window Rock, AZ
28. Zuni Mesa (fictitious location)
29. Zuni Mountains, NM

== Sources ==
- Linford, Laurance D. (2011). "Index of Places by Hillerman Title". Tony Hillerman's Navajoland: Hideouts, Haunts, and Havens in the Joe Leaphorn and Jim Chee Mysteries. University of Utah Press. ISBN 978-1-60781-988-2 – via Project MUSE.
