= Krippendorf's Tribe =

- Theatrical release poster
- Directed by: Todd Holland
- Screenplay by: Charlie Peters
- Based on: Krippendorf's Tribe by Frank Parkin
- Produced by: Larry Brezner; Ross Canter; Whitney Green
- Starring: Richard Dreyfuss; Jenna Elfman; Natasha Lyonne; Gregory Smith; Stephen Root; Elaine Stritch; Lily Tomlin
- Cinematography: Dean Cundey
- Edited by: Jon Poll
- Music by: Bruce Broughton
- Production company: Touchstone Pictures
- Distributed by: Buena Vista Pictures Distribution
- Release date: February 27, 1998
- Running time: 94 minutes
- Country: United States
- Language: English
- Box office: $7.5 million

Krippendorf's Tribe is a 1998 American comedy film directed by Todd Holland and based on Frank Parkin's 1985 novel of the same name. The film stars Richard Dreyfuss, Jenna Elfman, Natasha Lyonne, and Lily Tomlin. Its plot follows Professor James Krippendorf (Dreyfuss), an anthropologist who, with the help of his three children, creates a fictitious lost New Guinea tribe to cover up his misuse of grant money.

Krippendorf's Tribe was produced by Touchstone Pictures and distributed by Buena Vista Pictures. The film received generally negative reviews, with criticism for its racial stereotypes.

== Plot ==
Respected anthropologist James Krippendorf and his wife, Jennifer, bring their three children Shelly, Mickey & Edmund along during their much-enjoyed search in New Guinea for a lost tribe. The search fails, despite the family's best efforts. After Jennifer's death back in the U.S., Krippendorf falls into academic stagnation, having spent all his foundation grant money raising the children as a single parent. Scheduled to lecture at a college and fearful of being charged with misuse of grant funds, Krippendorf concocts an imaginary tribe, the Shelmikedmu, using the names of his children as a basis. He later fakes a 16 mm "documentary" film, casting his children as tribe members and superimposing footage of a legitimate New Guinean tribe so as to enhance the illusion.

Anthropologist Veronica Micelli contacts cable-TV producer Henry Spivey, forcing Krippendorf to continue creating fraudulent footage as Krippendorf's rival Ruth Allen becomes suspicious. Because he has described a culture unlike any other, Krippendorf's fraud becomes increasingly famous. Krippendorf himself masquerades as a tribal elder, while his two sons, Mickey and Edmund, create and enact increasingly imaginative rituals. Only the eldest child, Krippendorf's daughter Shelly, refuses to participate due to her disgust at the dishonesty perpetrated by her father.

Taking advantage of her curiosity, Krippendorf tricks Veronica into participating in his false documentary. When she discovers the truth, she is initially angry, but later helps Krippendorf continue his fraud. Ruth travels to New Guinea, discovering no tribe in the location specified by Krippendorf. She transmits the news via fax to a colleague, who exposes Krippendorf at a gala. Krippendorf's imaginative son, Mickey, improvises a lie, that the Shelmikedmu hide by means of a magical ritual known only to them.

Unknown to the majority of the characters, Shelly has contacted the New Guineans befriended by her family during the futile search for the lost tribe, urging them to masquerade as the Shelmikedmu in order to disappoint Ruth. The ruse succeeds, and the accusation of fraud is abandoned. Krippendorf, relieved of his worries, ends his fraud. He and Veronica become a couple, and she assumes the role of mother to his children.

== Cast ==
- Richard Dreyfuss as Professor James Krippendorf
- Jenna Elfman as Professor Veronica Micelli, James's love interest later new wife
- Lily Tomlin as Professor Ruth Allen, Krippendorf's rival
- Natasha Lyonne as Shelly Krippendorf, James's daughter
- Gregory Smith as Michael "Mickey" Krippendorf, James's first son
- Carl Michael Lindner as Edmund Krippendorf, James's second son
  - Jacob & Zachary Handy as Young Edmund
- Stephen Root as Dean Gerald Adams
- Elaine Stritch as Irene Hargrove
- Tom Poston as Gordon Hargrove, Irene's husband
- David Ogden Stiers as Henry Spivey
- Doris Belack as President Porter
- Julio Oscar Mechoso as Simon Alonso
- Siobhan Fallon as Lori
- Susan Ruttan as Mrs. O'Brian
- Barbara Williams as Professor Jennifer Harding Krippendorf, James's late wife
- Zakes Mokae as Sulukim
- Mila Kunis as Abbey Tournquist
- Frances Bay as Edith Proxmire
- Sandy Martin as Nurse

== Reception ==
=== Box office ===
Krippendorf's Tribe opened at #7 in its opening weekend with $3,316,377. By the end of its domestic run, the film grossed $7,571,115.

=== Critical response ===
The film received generally negative reviews. On Rotten Tomatoes, the film has an approval rating of 17% based on reviews from 41 critics, with an average rating of 4.2/10.

Roger Ebert of the Chicago Sun-Times gave the film a score of two out of four stars, writing: "Is it possible to recommend a whole comedy on the basis of one scene that made you laugh almost uncontrollably? I fear not. And yet Krippendorf's Tribe has such a scene, and many comedies have none." Kevin Thomas of the Los Angeles Times wrote that the film "revives all those old demeaning racist stereotypes in the most horrible ways," and that it "isn't remotely intelligent or sophisticated enough to make it as a pitch-dark comedy or satire", calling it "arguably the worst movie ever to come out of Disney".
