= Song of the Lion =

2017 mystery novel by Anne Hillerman

- Book cover of Song of the Lion
- Author: Anne Hillerman
- Published: 2017
- Publisher: HarperCollins
- ISBN: 978-0-06-239190-2
- OCLC: 1011025578
- Preceded by: Rock With Wings
- Followed by: Cave of Bones

Map of the Navajo Nation

Song of the Lion is a 2017 release and the third Leaphorn/Chee mystery written by Anne Hillerman, daughter of the series originator Tony Hillerman. The title is derived from Navajo culture, which speaks of a cougar, Náshdóítsoh, who protects the Navajo people. After her father's 2008 death, Anne continued the series. The Navajo Nation on which the story takes place, is a geographical area that spans 27,000 square miles over the connecting borders of the US states of Arizona, New Mexico and Utah. According to the NN itself, it encompasses 500 Indian tribes on 318 reservations.

== Plot ==
When off-duty Navajo Police Officer Bernadette Manuelito attends a basketball game at Shiprock High School, the game is disrupted by a car bomb in the parking lot. A young man named Richard Horseman was standing near the car and is injured in the blast, subsequently dying of his injuries. Witness Gloria Chino is able to provide a description and Horseman's first name. The car was a BMW owned by the center for the Chieftan basketball team, Aza Palmer. He is also an attorney hired to mediate over a Tuba City, Arizona conference to discuss plans to build a resort near the Grand Canyon. Manuelito's husband Jim Chee is directed by his superior officer Captain Howard Largo to accompany Palmer as his bodyguard.

FBI agent Jerry Cordova is assigned to investigate the bombing, while Manuelito files a report with Captain Largo. As Manuelito leaves the police station, office manager Sandra gives her a small object found on Tsoodził, a sacred mountain to the Navajos. Manuelito recognizes the object as the image of Náshdóítsoh, a mountain lion believed to protect the Navajo people, and she recalls a traditional praise song to the lion.

Manuelito and Cordova interview Mrs. Nez, the victim's grandmother, and come away thinking Horseman was not involved in the crime except being in the wrong place at the wrong time. Manuelito believes the grandmother was lying about Horseman's past. On her route to Tuba City to join her husband, she stops by to consult with Joe Leaphorn, and asks him to research Horseman. Now retired and disabled, Leaphorn verbally communicates in Navajo but seems to have lost his ability to speak English. With help from his live-in friend Louisa Bourebonette, he still has computer access to do the research for Manuelito. He later remembers Horseman as a young child he tried to help. Leaphorn's research reveals that the car bomb was detonated with a cell phone, so he deduces that Horseman was not a likely suspect.

Chee arrives at Tuba City and gets the lay of the conference from fellow police officer Cowboy Albert Dashee. He takes notice when he sees delegate Tom Blankenship bad-mouthing law enforcement, but is told Blankenship is a hot-head but harmless. After she arrives at the conference, Manuelito gets a phone call from Lona Palmer, former wife of Aza, telling her that Richard Horseman was her sister's son. When Manuelito tells Aza Palmer who the victim was, he's devastated. At the conference, she runs into medic Byrum Lee and remembers him as one of the first on the scene at the car bombing.

Manuelito and Palmer go for a drive, and are followed by "Rocket" Robert Palmer, son of Aza and Lona. They pull into a restaurant where father and son have an argument about the divorce. Robert also warns them of groups intent on disrupting the mediations. After the son leaves, Palmer tells Manuelito that he remembers seeing Robert's car in the parking lot when the Shiprock explosion happened. Shortly after leaving the restaurant, Robert is hospitalized after a roll-over accident with the car he was driving. Lona calls Manuelito to tell her of Robert's car accident. She mentions that part of Robert's anger is due to her past tumultuous relationship with Byrum Lee.

The San Juan Southern Paiute Tribe of Arizona was excluded from the conference mediations, because the tribe was deemed too small to be considered. An old Paiute named Denny Duke takes Palmer to talk to his mother, who explains to him why the land is sacred to the Paiute religion and should not be developed over. The entire convention group makes a trip to the potential canyon development site, where Palmer is kidnapped. Manuelito searches for him, and finds herself a target. Running for her life through the rocks, she encounters Náshdóítsoh and begins to sing the Navajo song praising the lion.

== Characters ==
Law enforcement

- Bernadette Manuelito: Formerly a federal Customs Patrol Officer and now an officer in the Navajo Tribal Police. She is the wife of Jim Chee. They live in Shiprock, New Mexico. She was introduced in The Fallen Man.
- Jim Chee: Sergeant in the Navajo Tribal Police, nicknamed "Cheeseburger" by Bernadette's family
- Joe Leaphorn: retired lieutenant from the Navajo Tribal Police, widowed. He lives in Window Rock, Arizona.
- Captain Howard Largo: superior officer at Navajo Tribal Police
- Sandra: officer manager at the police station
- Cowboy Albert Dashee: police officer
- Jerry Cordova: FBI investigator at the scene

Others

- Louisa Bourebonette: anthropologist who lives with Leaphorn since the death of his wife Emma. She was introduced in Coyote Waits.
- Richard Horseman: victim of the car bombing
- Mrs. Nez: Richard Horseman's grandmother
- Aza Palmer: divorced, owner of the car, and center for the Chieftan basketball team
- Lona Zahne: ex-wife of Aza
- Byrum Lee: Lona Zahne's former boyfriend, a medic who was at the Shiprock explosion
- Robert "Rocket" Palmer: son of Aza and Lona
- Gloria Chino: witness of the car bombing
- Tom Blankenship: delegate at Tuba City
- Denny Duke: councilor at the San Juan Southern Paiute Tribe of Arizona
- Darleen Manuelito: Bernadette's sister
- Clayton Secondy: Darleen Manuelito's boyfriend she refers to as "CS"

== Reception ==
The book was on the New York Times Best Seller list. Publishers Weekly was lukewarm about the basic plot, but lauded its "insights on the strength of family ties and the possibilities of redemption after a history of pain." Albuquerque Journal likened Hillerman's style of storytelling to "a Navajo blanket ... with Navajo lore, customs, descriptions of hardscrabble living and a web of entwined family and clan relationships."

Goodreads noted her skill with carrying on the tradition set by her father, "Writing with a clarity and grace that is all her own, Anne Hillerman depicts the beauty and mystery of Navajo Country and the rituals, myths, and customs of its people in a mystery that builds on and complements the beloved, bestselling mysteries of her acclaimed father, Tony Hillerman."
