= Baby Rock =

Baby Rock may refer to:

- Baby Rock (album), a 2005 mini-album by Japanese group Back-On
- "Baby Rock", a 2014 single by Gwendal Peizerat
- Baby Rock, a discotheque on Avenida Revolución in Tijuana, Mexico

== See also ==
- Baby Rocks, Arizona, a populated place in Navajo County, Arizona, United States
