= Bidahochi Formation =

Pliocene to Late Neogene geologic formation in the Colorado Plateau

- Stratigraphic range: Miocene–Pliocene 15.5–4.1 Ma
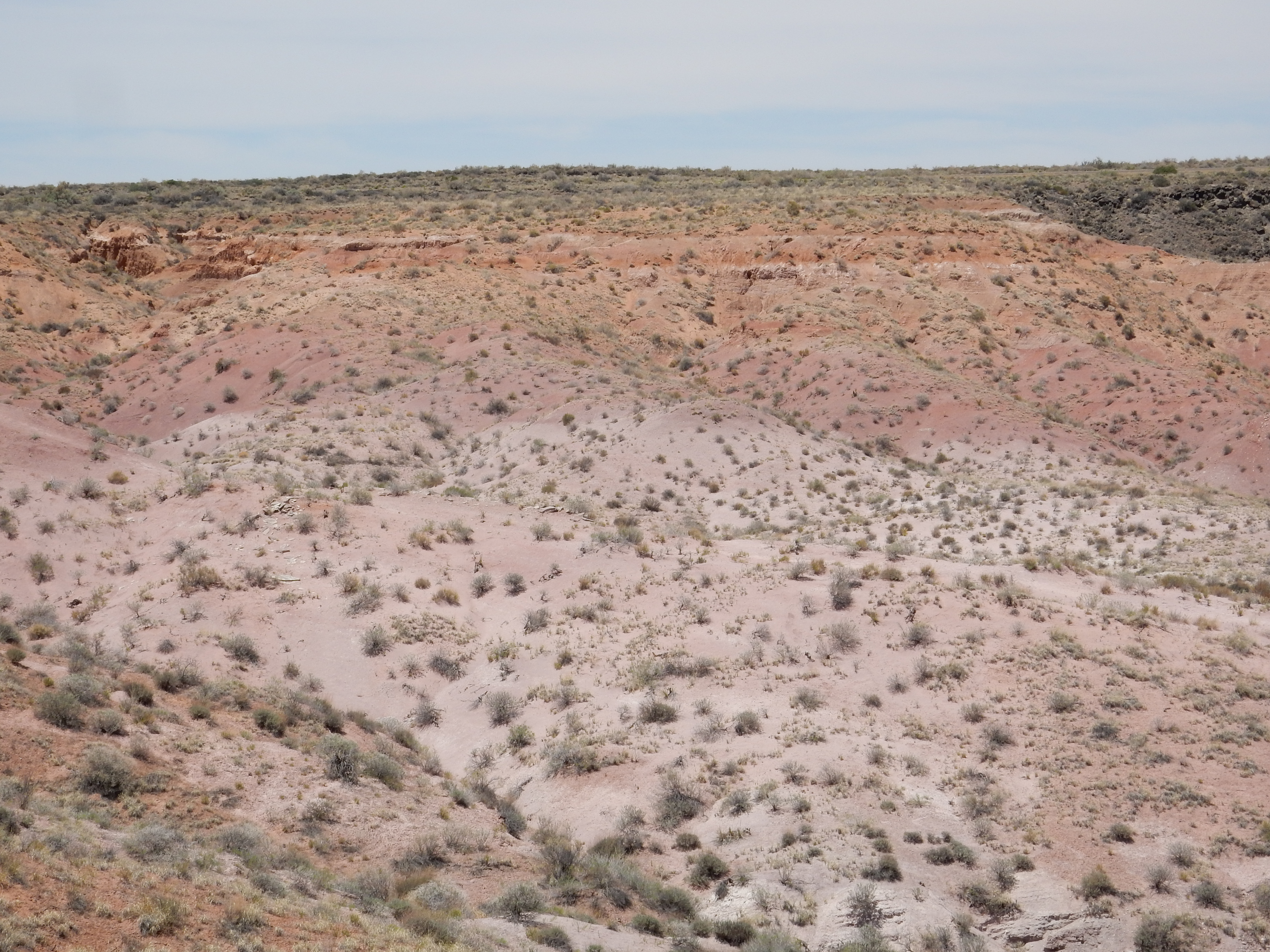
- Bidahochi Formation beds on the rim of the Black Forest basin, Petrified Forest National Park, Arizona, US
- Type: Geological formation
- Underlies: volcanic tuff (locally), or Quaternary alluvium
- Overlies: Chinle Formation–(225 Ma), erosion unconformity
- Area: 16,000 km^{2} (6,200 sq mi)
- Thickness: 488 feet (149 m) maximum (east of Bidahochi, AZ), variable

Lithology
- Primary: siltstone, sandstone, shale, volcanic tuff, limestone

Location
- Coordinates: 35.40°N 110.14°W
- Region: Colorado Plateau–(southeast perimeter), Arizona–(central-east)
- Country: United States
- Extent: SE perimeter Black Mesa (Arizona), NNW Defiance Plateau–(Uplift), S(E & NE north perimeter foothills White Mountains), NW & W Painted Desert

Type section
- Named for: Bidahochi, Arizona (Navajo Nation)
- Named by: A.B. Regan
- Year defined: 1924
- Bidahochi Formation (the United States) Bidahochi Formation (Arizona)

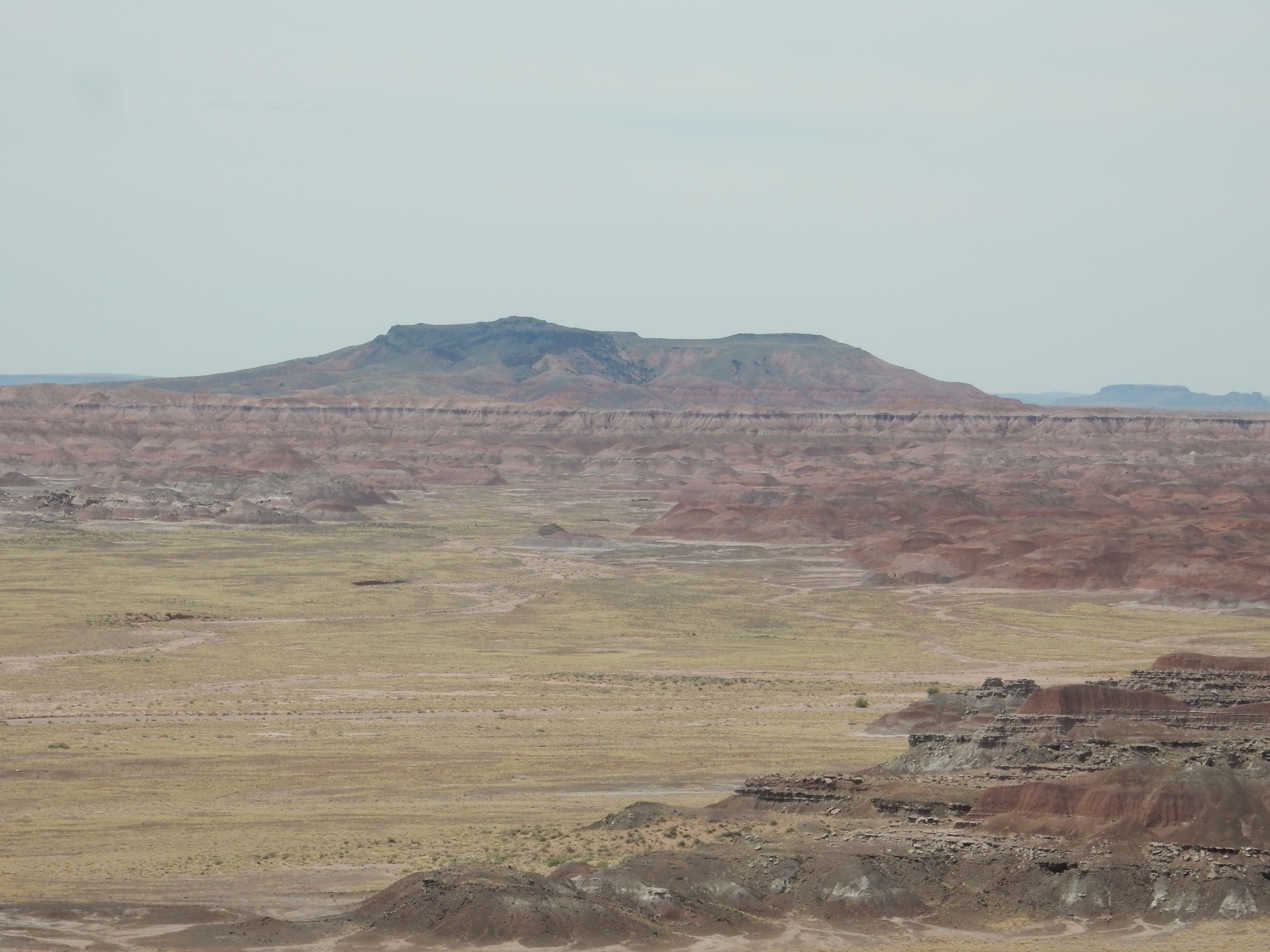
Pilot Rock in Petrified Forest National Park is underlain by Bidahochi Formation

The Pliocene to Late Neogene Bidahochi Formation lies at an elevation of about 6,300 feet (1,920 m) to 6,600 feet (2,012 m) at the southeast of the Colorado Plateau; the deposits are from Hopi Lake (also called Bidahochi Lake), and the deposits extend southwards to the region at the north perimeter of the White Mountains of central-east Arizona. Bidahochi Lake is thought to have been a single "large lake, or several shallow, and ephemeral ones." Various fossil types are found; also bird trackways.

The Bidahochi Formation contains basalt flows that form an erosional protecting unit above the highly erodable Chinle Formation. The Bidahochi Formation extends approximately 112 miles north–south, or north-northwest by south-southeast, a length approximately equivalent to today's Great Salt Lake of Utah.

The Bidahochi is possibly the only extensive nonvolcanic Neogene formation of the Colorado Plateau. It has been studied by geologists for clues to conditions on the plateau during this time interval and to test hypotheses for the initial incision of the Grand Canyon.

== Description ==
At its reference section near Indian Wells, Arizona, the Bidahochi Formation is divided into three informal members. The lower member is 214 feet (65 m) thick and consists mostly of mudstone and fine sandstone with a basal conglomerate of limestone and siltstone pebbles. The beds show distorted crossbedding and ripple marks, and plant fossils (impressions and petrified wood) are present. The middle volcanic member, which is only 5 feet (1.5 m) thick, consists of volcaniclastics, mostly basalt and quartzite pebbles. The upper member is over 274 feet (84 m) thick, forms ledges and slopes, and is mostly mudrock and sandstone.

The formation is exposed over an area of over 16,000 square kilometers (6,200 sq mi) in the Black Mesa and San Juan Basins. In many locations, the formation includes lava flows, which can appear at any level in the formation, but are most common in the middle informal member. The lava flows within the formation are typically found capping mesas. The contacts between the informal members do not define consistent stratigraphic positions, and the members are probably better interpreted as depositional facies rather than stratigraphic units. The formation is underlain by various Mesozoic formations, such as the Chinle Formation, and is typically the uppermost named unit in its outcrop area.

The formation is likely middle Miocene to middle Pliocene in age, and the lower part of the formation may correlate with the Fence Lake Formation. One of the lava flows within the formation has a radiometric age of 4.1 million years, and radiometric dating of other associated flows and ash beds gives the formation an age range of 15.5 to 4 million years.

The formation is interpreted as mostly alluvium, though eolian, lacustrine, and spring deposits are also present, in addition to lava flows and ash beds. The lower member has been interpreted as a lacustrine facies and the upper member as a fluvial facies. The lacustrine deposits suggests widespread lakes in the area, though geologists continue to debate whether there was a single large lake (Hopi Lake) or a series of smaller ephemeral lakes, or whether Hopi Lake was a shallow playa lake or a deep lake. However, the evidence from the maars and scoria cones erupted through the formation favors a shallow, possibly ephemeral, lake.

The formation has been likened to the Ogallala Formation of eastern New Mexico and west Texas in both age and depositional environment.

== Hopi Lake and the Grand Canyon ==
The Bidahochi is possibly the only large non-volcanic geologic formation of Neogene age on the Colorado Plateau. This has made it of interest to geologists attempting to reconstruct conditions on the Colorado Plateau during the Neogene and for theories of the formation of the Grand Canyon.

In some locations, the Bidahochi Formation preserves an erosional surface in the underlying Mesozoic bedrock (Hopi Buttes surface). Examination of clay minerals in the erosional surface using X-ray crystallography indicate a lack of chemical weathering. This in turn is an indication that the southern Colorado Plateau has been semiarid throughout most of the Neogene, even at times when the rest of western North America was relatively damp. The plateau may then have been a deep basin in the rain shadow of the southern Rocky Mountains and the Central Arizona Highlands.

It has also been suggested that Hopi Lake played a role in the original incision of the Grand Canyon. According to this hypothesis, the lake filled to the point where it overtopped its basin to the west, resulting in rapid incision and formation of the canyon. However, the characteristics of maars and scoria cones in the Bidahochi suggest that Hopi Lake was quite shallow, and a deep lake would have filled very quickly. An alternate hypothesis is that the Colorado River originally joined a drainage to the north, the Bell River, and the western part of the canyon was flooded by Hualapai Lake, which backed up to the Bidahochi basin. Only after the opening of the Gulf of California was the Colorado River integrated into a drainage to the south. Old delta deposits in the Bidahochi Formation at the mouths of paleocanyons are cited as evidence for this hypothesis.

== History of investigation ==
The formation was first named by A.B. Regan in 1924, for outcrops throughout the Hopi Buttes volcanic field. In 1954, Charles Repenning and James Irwin defined a reference section near Indian Wells, and divided the unit into informal lower, volcanic, and upper members. D.W. Love concluded that the members defined in the formation by earlier investigators were mere depositional facies and recommended their abandonment.

== See also ==
- Petrified Forest National Park
- Painted Desert, Arizona
