= Spider Woman's Daughter =

2013 novel by Anne Hillerman

- Book cover of Spider Woman's Daughter
- Author: Anne Hillerman
- Published: 2013
- Publisher: HarperCollins
- ISBN: 978-0-06-227048-1
- OCLC: 858611222
- Preceded by: The Shape Shifter
- Followed by: Rock With Wings

Map of the Navajo Nation

Spider Woman's Daughter is a crime novel by American writer Anne Hillerman, released in 2013. It is the first Leaphorn/Chee mystery written by her, the daughter of the series originator Tony Hillerman. The title of the book is derived from Native American legends. Spider Woman was the one who taught the Navajo people how to weave. Officer Bernadette Manuelito is the daughter of a weaver, and married to Officer Jim Chee. He nicknamed her "Spider Woman's Daughter" for her ability to weave together a complex array of evidence to solve a crime. In her debut effort to continue the series, Anne Hillerman has given the reader an exceptionally detailed plot and long list of characters. One reviewer at Goodreads.com counted 46 named characters.

The Navajo Nation on which the story takes place, abuts a geographical area known as the Four Corners. The nation spans the connecting borders of the US states of Arizona, New Mexico, Colorado and Utah. According to the NN itself, it encompasses 500 Indian tribes on 318 reservations. The book's fictional Double X Ranch in southern Colorado, while not part of the Navajo Nation, connects to it at the Four Corners.

== Plot ==
Officer Bernadette Manuelito witnesses someone shoot Lieutenant Joe Leaphorn in the head and escape in a 2-door blue sedan with an Arizona license plate. Investigation reveals Gloria Bernally is the owner of the get-away vehicle. Her son Jackson, who uses it to drive to the University of New Mexico with his friend "Lizard" Leonard Nez, left it at Basha's grocery for her.

At Leaphorn's house, Chee searches for recent case files, but finds old hard copy files that he takes home to compile a suspect list. Manuelito leaves a note for Leaphorn's girlfriend Louisa Bourbonette requesting a phone call. Louisa calls Chee from Albuquerque, on her way to a conference in Houston. She remembers that Leaphorn recently told her of "a ghost from the past", but she didn't know anymore than that. Louisa dodges when Chee asks her about the conference. Chee believes the FBI will suspect her of a murder-for-hire.

Manuelito learns that Leaphorn was evaluating the assessed valuation of a proposed acquisition from the Grove McManus Foundation, headquartered in Japan. The evaluation summary is missing. Dr. Maxie Davis from the American Indian Resource Center calls asking about Leaphorn's missing evaluation summary. The original appraisal firm was listed as EFB, owned by Eleanor Friedman-Bernal. When they arrive at the address, EFB is closed and Friedman-Bernal seems to have vanished. Chee remembers that he and Leaphorn once rescued Ellie Friedman at Chaco Canyon when a man named Randall Eliott tried to kill her.

Jackson Bernally phones Chee to tell him that he uses his mother's car on the weekends at his southern Colorado job on the Double X Ranch. The Ranch does not fall under Navajo jurisdiction, but owner Slim Jacobs agrees to be interviewed by Manuelito. Friedman had a recent appointment with Jacobs, but she never showed up. He says Chaco Canyon pottery was her specialty, and someone hired her to do an appraisal when the original shipment of Chaco Canyon Anasazi antiquities were sold to a buyer in Japan. She was angry the antiquities were going out of the country. Friedman and Davis had set up a dig on the ranch, with Friedman doing the digging and Davis taking the photos. Chee remembers seeing Maxie Davis in the canyon years ago, when he and Leaphorn rescued Friedman from Randall Eliott.

Back in Shiprock, Ranger Stephen finds a woman's body on the trail. The victim is wearing a sand-cast silver bracelet, with linked hearts.

Chee goes to the American Indian Resource Center to take some photos for Manuelito, where Davis is waiting for him with a gun. She begins to rant about Friedman, accusing her of lying about Randall, causing Leaphorn to leave him in the canyon to die. Davis had made fake cylinders for Japan, stashing the real ones at a storage shed in Cuba. When Leaphorn figured out why she had under-valued the cylinders, Davis claims Friedman shot him to save her business reputation.

Manuelito arrives at the storage sheds in Cuba, and arms herself with the gun in Louisa's glove box. She identifies herself as Navajo tribal police at the office. The attendant says a woman with Friedman's ID has gone to the locker. Manuelito finds Chee tied to a mattress on his back, with Davis shouting that he's going to hell. Davis sneaks up behind Manuelito and tasers her, and ties her up. It's then Manuelito see the black gloves and bracelet, and knows Davis is the one who shot Leaphorn. Davis rants about renting Jackson's car on the ranch and making a copy of the key. She pours gasoline and sets the ignition to a timer, driving off. Manuelito manages to wriggle free and defuse it. Manuelito frees Chee, and the police finally arrive (the office landline was out of order so the attendant ran to a nearby business). Davis is apprehended by the FBI.

== Characters ==
Law enforcement

- Bernadette Manuelito: Formerly a federal Customs Patrol Officer and now an officer in the Navajo Tribal Police. She is the wife of Jim Chee. They live in Shiprock, New Mexico. She was introduced in The Fallen Man.
- Jim Chee: Sergeant in the Navajo Tribal Police, nicknamed "Cheeseburger" by Bernadette's family
- Joe Leaphorn: Retired lieutenant from the Navajo Tribal Police, widowed. He lives in Window Rock, Arizona.
- Captain Howard Largo: Superior officer at Navajo Tribal Police
- Officer Harold Bigman
- Sandra is the officer manager at the police station
- Jerry Cordova: FBI investigator, drives a black Ford Crown Victoria Police Interceptor

Window Rock, Arizona

- Louisa Bourebonette: Anthropologist who lives with Leaphorn since the death of his wife Emma. She was introduced in Coyote Waits. Legally her name is Louisa Ann Tyler, or L. A. Tyler, but she used her maiden name for work.
- Nellie Roanhorse, waitress at the Navajo Inn.
- Gloria Bernally, mother of Jackson and owner of the car
- Jackson Bernally drives the car involved, attends UNM in Gallup
- "Lizard" Leonard Nez, Jackson's friend and co-driver
- Professor Coburn, Jackson's prof

Santa Fe, New Mexico

- Neurologist Grant Moxsley, in charge of Leaphorn at the hospital
- Dr. John Collingsworth, PhD, director of the American Indian Resource Center. (AIRC)
- Reverend Rodriguez, hospital chaplain
- Marjorie Rockwell is Dr. C's secretary.
- Dr. Maxie Davis, associate director at AIRC.
- EFB Appraisals, Eleanor Friedman-Bernal
- Janelle, EFB's landlord and owner of "Tailoring by Janelle"
- Rocko Delbert, a former Navajo police officer
- Mark Yazzie the gardener at AIRC

Toadlena at Two Grey Hills

- Bernadette's mother, a weaver before her hands were crippled with arthritis
- Darleen Manuelito, Bernadette's sister; Darleen is an artist and a high school drop-out with a chip on her shoulder
- Stoop Boy, Darleen's boyfriend. Real name Charley Zah
- Stella Darkwater, neighbor of Bernadette's mother.
- Mr. Darkwater, who stays with Bernie's mother when Mrs. Darkwater is not home.

Chaco Canyon

- Karen Dundee, camper from Denver
- Dorky Hat, someone Karen saw arguing with a woman (Long Sleeves) in the canyon
- Andrew Stephen, park ranger, a 15-year veteran of the work
- Joe Wakara, heard of park security, and a friend of Chee's, is not there today
- Randall Eliott nearly killed EFB before, Maxie Davis' boyfriend, he was killed when they rescued EFB
- Tim Morris, a San Juan County deputy
- Richard Wetherill has a grave in the canyon

Others

- Austin Lee, Farmington, New Mexico, Leaphorn's clan brother
- Garrison Tsosie, jewelry maker with a police record
- Rose, Garrison's live-in girlfriend
- Notah Tsosie, Garrison's brother in prison, also a jewelry maker
- Slim Jacobs, owner/manager of the Double X Ranch
- Hosteen Nakai, Chee's uncle who taught him the chanting

== Reception ==
The book won the 2014 Spur Award for Best First Novel from the Western Writers of America, and landed on the New York Times Best Seller list.

"The torch passes." – Joe Hartlob, Bookreporter.com

"With big shoes to fill, Hillerman does her best to copy the style of her father Tony’s beloved series, maintaining the integrity of Navajo culture throughout. Fans will spot the guilty party a mile off." – Kirkus Reviews

James Blasingame for the Journal of Adolescent & Adult Literacy commended Anne Hillerman for keeping the subject matter at a PG level. He notes that Manuelito is her own person with "grit and determination".

"Spider Woman’s Daughter continues the Hillerman tradition, providing likable heroes against despicable villains coming together in unusual and intriguing situations in a glorious, little-understood world." – Carolyn Haley, NY Journal of Books
