= Bonita Creek Estates, Arizona =

- Populated place
- Location within the state of Arizona Bonita Creek Estates (the United States)
- Coordinates: 34°22′43″N 111°13′27″W
- Country: United States
- State: Arizona
- County: Gila
- Elevation: 5,915 ft (1,803 m)
- Time zone: UTC-7 (Mountain (MST))
  - Summer (DST): UTC-7 (MST)
- Area code: 928
- GNIS feature ID: 2056532

Bonita Creek Estates is a populated place in Gila County, Arizona, United States. It has an estimated elevation of 5,915 feet (1,803 m) above sea level.
