= Anne Hillerman =

American journalist and novelist (born 1949)

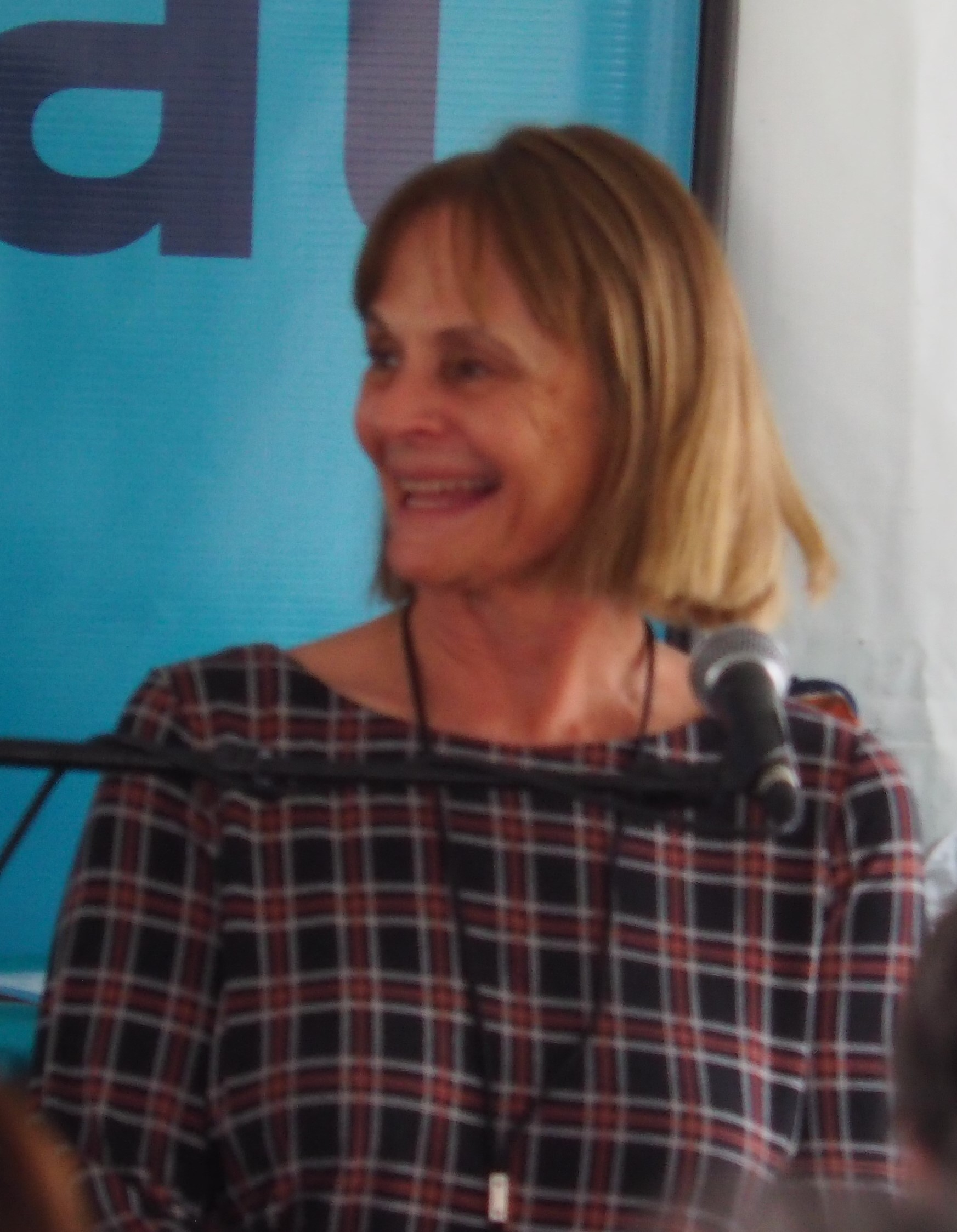
- Hillerman in 2019
- Born: October 2, 1949 (age 77); Lawton, Oklahoma, U.S.
- Education: Journalism
- Alma mater: University of New Mexico
- Occupation: Author
- Spouse: Don Strel
- Relatives: Tony Hillerman; Marie Unzner
- Writing career
- Notable awards: Spur Award for Best First Novel, 2014
- Website: Anne Hillerman

Anne Hillerman (born October 2, 1949) is an American journalist from New Mexico, and a New York Times best-selling author. The daughter of novelist Tony Hillerman, she has continued her father's series of Joe Leaphorn-Jim Chee novels following his death, adding officer Bernadette Manuelito as a full partner in solving the crimes.

== Biography ==
She is the daughter of novelist Tony Hillerman and his wife Marie Unzner, and was married to photographer Don Strel, who died in 2020. Anne has served as arts editor and editorial page editor, as well as writer, for The Santa Fe New Mexican newspaper and the Albuquerque Journal. Her first books were primarily about travel, local New Mexico points of interest, and restaurants. She and Strel collaborated on Santa Fe Flavors: Best Restaurants and Recipes and Gardens of Santa Fe.

== Leaphorn and Chee novels ==
Tony Hillerman, who died in 2008, was best known for his Leaphorn and Chee mystery novels. Tony Hillerman's Landscapes: On the Road with Chee and Leaphorn was begun by Anne before his death, and includes his comments. With Anne gleaning locale details from her father's novels, and her husband taking the photographs, she intended it as a book to draw in readers of his novels, a guide for the reader to visualize the New Mexico and Arizona sites from the perspective of the two main protagonists Joe Leaphorn and Jim Chee.

After her father's death, Anne continued the Leaphorn and Chee series, but Leaphorn's involvement is curtailed in the first chapter of the first book, Spider Woman's Daughter. Leaphorn is the victim of an assassination attempt, spends half of the book in a coma, and later was severely limited in his ability to communicate. Chee and Bernadette Manuelito are the crime solvers from that book forward in the series, with Leaphorn mentioned sporadically in the background but never fully active in the investigations. Spider Woman's Daughter garnered the 2014 Spur Award for Best First Novel from the Western Writers of America, and landed on the New York Times Best Seller list.

She followed that with a change in the series, Rock With Wings, Song of the Lion and Cave of Bones, released April 2018, all of which have also been on the New York Times Best Seller list. Hillerman has continued to publish several more adventures in the series.

== Bibliography ==
General subjects

- 1988: (with Mina Yamashita) Done in the Sun: Solar Projects for Children (1st ed.). Santa Fe, N.M.: Sunstone Press. 1988. ISBN 978-0-86534-018-3.
- 1995: Ride the Wind, USA to Africa. Santa Fe, N.M.: Rio Grande Pub. 1995. ISBN 978-0-9642561-7-0.
- 1998: (with Tamar Stieber) The Insider's Guide to Santa Fe (1st ed.). Manteo, N.C.: Insiders' Publishing. 1998. ISBN 978-1-57380-052-5.
- 2005: Children's Guide to Santa Fe (New ed.). Santa Fe, N.M.: Sunstone Press. 2005. ISBN 978-0-86534-448-8.
- 2009: (with Don Strel) Santa Fe Flavors: Best Restaurants and Recipes (First ed.). Layton, Utah: Gibbs Smith. 2009. ISBN 978-1-4619-5709-6.
- 2010: (with Don Strel) Gardens of Santa Fe (1st ed.). Layton, Utah: Gibbs Smith. 2010. ISBN 978-1-4236-0331-3.

Joe Leaphorn and Jim Chee

- 2009: (photos by Don Strel) Tony Hillerman's Landscapes: On the Road with Chee and Leaphorn. New York: HarperCollins. 2009. ISBN 978-0-06-137429-6.

Joe Leaphorn, Jim Chee and Bernadette Manuelito

1. 2013: Spider Woman's Daughter. New York: HarperCollins. 2013. ISBN 978-0-06-227048-1.
2. 2015: Rock With Wings. New York: HarperCollins. 2015. ISBN 978-0-06-227051-1.
3. 2017: Song of the Lion. New York: HarperCollins. 2017. ISBN 978-0-06-239190-2.
4. 2018: Cave of Bones. New York: HarperCollins. 2018. ISBN 978-0-06-239192-6.
5. 2019: The Tale Teller. New York: HarperCollins. 2019. ISBN 978-0-06-239195-7.
6. 2021: Stargazer: A Leaphorn, Chee & Manuelito Novel. New York: HarperCollins. 2021. ISBN 978-0-06-290833-9.
7. 2022: The Sacred Bridge: A Leaphorn, Chee & Manuelito Novel. New York: HarperCollins. 2022. ISBN 978-0-06-290836-0.
8. 2023: The Way of the Bear: A Leaphorn, Chee & Manuelito Novel. New York: HarperCollins. 2023. ISBN 9780062908391.
9. 2024: Lost Birds: A Leaphorn, Chee & Manuelito Novel. New York: HarperCollins. 2024. ISBN 978-0063344785.
10. 2025: Shadow of the Solstice: A Leaphorn, Chee & Manuelito Novel. New York: HarperCollins. ISBN 978-0-06-334485-3
