= Briggs, Arizona =

- Populated place
- Location within the state of Arizona Briggs, Arizona (the United States)
- Coordinates: 34°03′39″N 112°28′33″W
- Country: United States
- State: Arizona
- County: Yavapai
- Elevation: 2,759 ft (841 m)
- Time zone: UTC-7 (Mountain (MST))
  - Summer (DST): UTC-7 (MST)
- Area code: 928
- FIPS code: 04-07775
- GNIS feature ID: 24336

Briggs is a populated place situated in Yavapai County, Arizona, United States. It has an estimated elevation of 2,759 feet (841 m) above sea level.
