= Barkerville, Arizona =

- Populated place
- Location of Barkerville in Arizona
- Coordinates: 32°49′54″N 110°56′43″W
- Country: United States
- State: Arizona
- County: Pinal
- Elevation: 3,900 ft (1,190 m)
- Time zone: UTC-7 (Mountain (MST))
  - Summer (DST): UTC-7 (MST)
- Area code: 520
- FIPS code: 04-05300
- GNIS feature ID: 24316

Barkerville is a populated place situated within Pinal County, Arizona. It has an estimated elevation of 3,904 feet (1,190 m) above sea level.
