= Torreon, New Mexico =

Torreon is the name of some places in the U.S. state of New Mexico:

- Torreon, Sandoval County, New Mexico
- Torreon, Torrance County, New Mexico
