= Anthropologist =

Person with an extensive knowledge of human behavior and societies

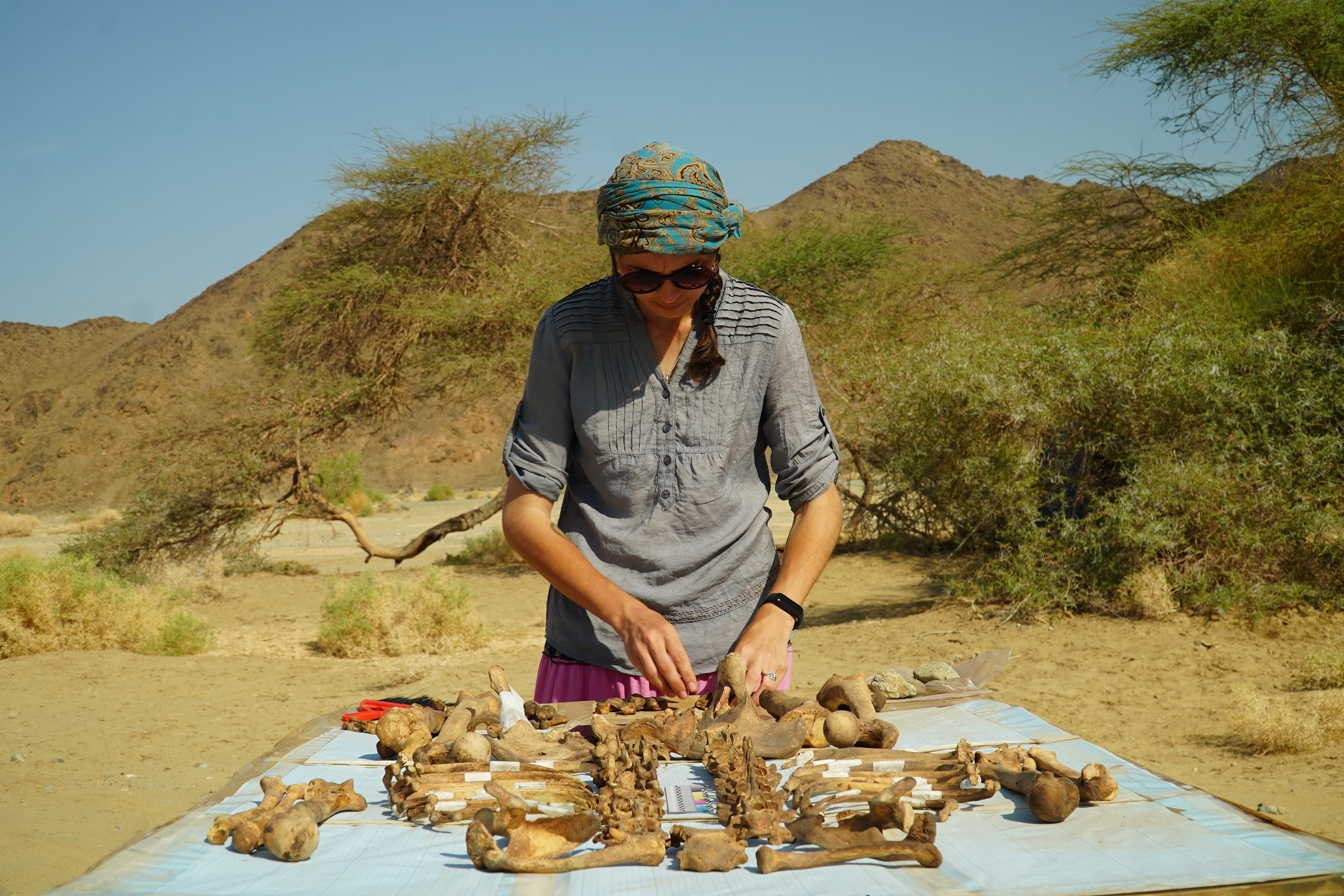
An anthropologist from the Moscow State University at work in the Sudan, 2022

An anthropologist is a social scientist engaged in the practice of anthropology. Anthropologists study aspects of humans within past and present societies. Anthropologists are trying to understand the "big picture" of what it means to be human for a group of people in the world. Social anthropology, cultural anthropology and philosophical anthropology study the norms, values, and general behavior of societies. Linguistic anthropology studies how language affects social life and is closely related to Sociolinguistics, while economic anthropology studies human economic behavior. Biological (physical), forensic, and medical anthropology study the biology and evolution of humans and their primate relatives, the application of biological anthropology in a legal setting, and the study of diseases and their impacts on humans over time, respectively.

== Education ==
Anthropologists usually cover a breadth of topics within anthropology in their undergraduate education and then proceed to specialize in topics of their own choice at the graduate level. In some universities, a qualifying exam serves to test both the breadth and depth of a student's understanding of anthropology; the students who pass are permitted to work on a doctoral dissertation.

Anthropologists typically hold graduate degrees, either doctorates or master's degrees. Not holding an advanced degree is rare in the field. Some anthropologists hold undergraduate degrees in other fields than anthropology and graduate degrees in anthropology.

== Career ==
Research topics of anthropologists include the discovery of human remains and artifacts as well as the exploration of social and cultural issues such as population growth, structural inequality and globalization by making use of a variety of technologies including statistical software and Geographic Information Systems (GIS). Anthropological field work requires a faithful representation of observations and a strict adherence to social and ethical responsibilities, such as the acquisition of consent, transparency in research and methodologies and the right to anonymity.

Historically, anthropologists primarily worked in academic settings; however, by 2014, U.S. anthropologists and archaeologists were largely employed in research positions (28%), management and consulting (23%) and government positions (27%). U.S. employment of anthropologists and archaeologists is projected to increase from 7,600 to 7,900 between 2016 and 2026, a growth rate just under half the national median.

Anthropologists without doctorates tend to work more in other fields than academia, while the majority of those with doctorates are primarily employed in academia. Many of those without doctorates in academia tend to work exclusively as researchers and do not teach. Those in research-only positions are often not considered faculty. The median salary for anthropologists in 2015 was $62,220. Many anthropologists report an above average level of job satisfaction.

Although closely related and often grouped with archaeology, anthropologists and archaeologists perform differing roles, though archeology is considered a sub-discipline of anthropology. While both professions focus on the study of human culture from past to present, archaeologists focus specifically on analyzing material remains such as artifacts and architectural remains. Anthropology encompasses a wider range of professions including the rising fields of forensic anthropology, digital anthropology and cyber anthropology. The role of an anthropologist differs as well from that of a historian. While anthropologists focus their studies on humans and human behavior, historians look at events from a broader perspective. Historians also tend to focus less on culture than anthropologists in their studies. A far greater percentage of historians are employed in academic settings than anthropologists, who have more diverse places of employment.

Anthropologists are experiencing a shift in the twenty-first century United States with the rise of forensic anthropology. In the United States, as opposed to many other countries forensic anthropology falls under the domain of the anthropologist and not the Forensic pathologist. In this role, forensic anthropologists help in the identification of skeletal remains by deducing biological characteristics such as sex, age, stature and ancestry from the skeleton. However, forensic anthropologists tend to gravitate more toward working in academic and laboratory settings, while forensic pathologists perform more applied field work. Forensic anthropologists typically hold academic doctorates, while forensic pathologists are medical doctors. The field of forensic anthropology is rapidly evolving with increasingly capable technology and more extensive databases. Forensic anthropology is one of the most specialized and competitive job areas within the field of anthropology and currently has more qualified graduates than positions.

The profession of Anthropology has also received an additional sub-field with the rise of Digital anthropology. This new branch of the profession has an increased usage of computers as well as interdisciplinary work with medicine, computer visualization, industrial design, biology and journalism. Anthropologists in this field primarily study the evolution of human reciprocal relations with the computer-generated world. Cyber anthropologists also study digital and cyber ethics along with the global implications of increasing connectivity. With cyber ethical issues such as net neutrality increasingly coming to light, this sub-field is rapidly gaining more recognition. One rapidly emerging branch of interest for cyber anthropologists is artificial intelligence. Cyber anthropologists study the co-evolutionary relationship between humans and artificial intelligence. This includes the examination of computer-generated (CG) environments and how people interact with them through media such as movies, television, and video.

== Methods anthropologists use ==
A central method anthropologists use is participant observation and having informal conversations with people. Anthropologists take part in both observed conversations and participatory conversations. Observed is where the anthropologist is observing a conversation that is happening without them directly involved. On the other hand, participatory conversations are where they are actually talking to the participant which can be in the form of an interview.

== Cultural anthropologist ==
Cultural anthropology is a sub-field of anthropology specializing in the study of different cultures. They study both small-scale, traditional communities, such as isolated villages, and large-scale, modern societies, such as large cities. They look at different behaviors and patterns within a culture. In order to study these cultures, many anthropologists will live among the culture they are studying.

Cultural anthropologists can work as professors, work for corporations, nonprofit organizations, as well as government agencies.

== Linguistic anthropologist ==
Linguistic anthropology is a sub-field of anthropology that specializes in the study of how random sounds eventually collect into meaningful language. Linguistic anthropologists are the people studying ways in which language can create and sustain beliefs, relationships, and meaning in the world.

In order to become a professional linguistic anthropologist, people obtain their doctorate degrees in anthropology. During the PhD, students take 3-4 years of coursework, including classes such as phonetics, morphology, and syntax. Next, they acquire an in depth understanding of the history and society of a specific place in the world. After finishing their coursework and finishing exams, they move onto their fieldwork.

There are job opportunities both in and out of academia. Other jobs may include researching social media and information technology practices and policymaking for bilingual language education. Another option is creating their own new language.

== Notable anthropologists and publications ==
Some notable anthropologists include: Molefi Kete Asante, Ruth Benedict, Franz Boas, Ella Deloria, St. Clair Drake, John Hope Franklin, James George Frazer, Clifford Geertz, Edward C. Green, Zora Neale Hurston, Claude Lévi-Strauss, Bronisław Malinowski, Margaret Mead, Elsie Clews Parsons, Pearl Primus, Paul Rabinow, Alfred Radcliffe-Brown, Marshall Sahlins, Nancy Scheper-Hughes (b. 1944), Al-Shater Bossely Abdul Jalil (1901–1977), Hortense Spillers, Edward Burnett Tylor (1832–1917) and Frances Cress Welsing.

== See also ==
- Association of Black Anthropologists
- Biologist
- List of anthropologists
- List of fictional anthropologists
- Psychologist
