= Buena Vista, Arizona =

- Populated place
- Location within Arizona Location within the United States
- Coordinates: 32°50′37″N 109°33′43″W
- Country: United States
- State: Arizona
- County: Graham
- Elevation: 3,041 ft (927 m)
- Time zone: UTC-7 (Mountain (MST))
  - Summer (DST): UTC-7 (MST)
- ZIP codes: 85546
- Area code: 928
- FIPS code: 04-08150
- GNIS feature ID: 2129

Buena Vista is a populated place situated in Graham County, Arizona, United States.
