= Frank Parkin =

British sociologist and writer (1931–2011)

Dr. Frank Parkin (26 May 1931 – 14 September 2011) was a British sociologist and novelist. He was a professor emeritus at the University of Kent and editor of the Concepts in the Social Sciences series published by Open University Press.

== Biography ==
Frank Parkin was born in 1931 in Aberdare, Mid Glamorgan, Wales. He studied at the London School of Economics and was awarded a PhD in 1966. He worked briefly as an assistant lecturer at the University of Hull in 1964 and 1965. He joined the University of Kent. in its opening year, 1965 as one if its first lecturers, progressing to Reader by 1974. He later became lecturer in politics and a fellow of Magdalen College, Oxford. At some point he left this position. From the early 1980s and onwards, Parkin wrote little sociology, focusing instead on fiction. Exceptions to this are his book on Durkheim from 1992, and the second edition of his book on Weber in 2002.

== Closure theory ==
In sociology, Frank Parkin is best known for his contribution to the theory of social closure, most fully laid out in his Marxism and class theory: A bourgeois critique. In quite sharp tone, Parkin argues that Marxist theories of social class were marked by fundamental deficiencies, particularly associated with the ambiguous status of their central explanatory concept, mode of production. He attacks the Marxists' overemphasis on deep levels of structure, at the expense of social actors, and suggests a radical recasting of the theory of class and stratification. He proposes to do this by centring theory around the concept of social closure. Parkin follows Weber in understanding closure as

the process by which social collectives seek to maximise rewards by restricting access to resources and opportunities to a limited circle of eligibles. This entails the singling out of certain social or physical attributes as the justificatory basis of exclusion. Weber suggests that virtually any group attribute – race, language, social origin, religion- may be seized upon provided it can be used for "the monopolization of specific, usually economic opportunities". This monopolisation is directed against competitors who share some positive or negative characteristic; its purpose is always the closure of social and economic opportunities to outsiders. The nature of these exclusionary practices, and the completeness of social closure, determine the general character of the distributive system.

Parkin goes on to elaborate this concept, by identifying two main types, exclusionary and usurpationary closure. 'The distinguishing feature of exclusionary closure is the attempt by one group to secure for itself a privileged position at the expense of some other group through processes of subordination'. He refers to this metaphorically as the use of power downwards. Usurpationary closure, however, is the use of power upwards, by the groups of subordinates created by the exclusionary closure, aimed at winning a greater share of resources, threatening 'to bite into the privileges of legally defined superiors'.

Arguably, the most novel aspect of Parkin's contribution was that he wanted to define classes in terms of their closure strategies, as opposed to defining class with reference to some structure of positions. The bourgeoisie could be identified, he held, by their reliance on exclusionary closure, as opposed to, say, their ownership of the means of production. Similarly, a subordinate class would be identified by their reliance on usurpationary closure:

the familiar distinction between bourgeoisie and proletariat, in its classic as well as its modern guise, may be conceived of as an expression of conflict between classes defined not specifically in relation to their place in the productive process but in relation to their prevalent modes of closure, exclusion and usurpation, respectively.

== Writing style ==
Parkin's works, at least those from the late '70s and onwards, are notable for their lively discursive tone, frequently using sarcasm and irony in driving home their points. This was noted by many reviewers of Marxism and class theory. Dennis Wrong called it a "bitingly witty and incisive assault on the sociological pretensions of western academic Marxism". Guenter Roth remarked: "This is an unusually well-written essay. Its wit, sense of irony, and elegance of phrase add stylistic power to a trenchant critique of Marxist class theories and to 're- thinking class analysis'...". Gavin Mackenzie called it "a beautifully written, savage and supremely witty attack" on Marxism: "I haven't laughed so much since ethnomethodology". Anthony Giddens commented on the "vivid change in [Parkin's] writing style": while Class inequality and political order (1971) was 'written neutrally and dispassionately', Marxism and class theory was marked by a 'deliberatively provocative tone'. 'Parkin's discussion of contemporary marxist accounts of class is heavily ironic and often openly sarcastic.' Giddens drew particular attention to the first page of the Preface:.

Lenin's wry comments on the efflorescence of Marxism in Russia at the turn of the century seem quite pertinent to our own time and place:
'Marxist books were published one after another, Marxist journals and newspapers were founded, nearly everyone became a Marxist, Marxists were flattered, Marxists were courted and the book publishers rejoiced at the extraordinary, ready sale of Marxist literature.'
Lenin was not too enthusiastic about a species of Marxism that appeared to be more congenial to the literati than to the class that really mattered. On these grounds alone, it is unlikely that he would have felt very differently about the Marxist products that have been manufactured and marketed in western universities over the past decade or so. Contemporary western Marxism, unlike its classical predecessor, is wholly the creation of academic social theorists – more specifically, the creation of the new professoriate that rose up on the wave of university expansion in the 1960s. The natural constituency of this Marxism is not of course the working class, but the massed ranks of undergraduates and postgraduate students in the social sciences; its content and design mark it out exclusively for use in the lecture theatre, the seminar room, and the doctoral dissertation. Hence the strange and fascinating spectacle to be witnessed in social science faculties throughout western Europe and beyond of diligent bands of research students and their mentors busily combing through the pages of Theories of Surplus Value in search of social reality.

Parkin continues:

As if to make secure its newly-won respectability, professorial Marxism has, in the manner of all exclusive bodies, carried out its discourse through the medium of an arcane language not readily accessible to the uninstructed. Certainly no-one could possibly accuse the Marxist professoriate of spreading the kind of ideas likely to cause a stampede to the barricades or the picket lines. Indeed, the uncomplicated theory that has traditionally inspired that sort of extra-mural activity is now rather loftily dismissed as 'vulgar' Marxism – literally, the Marxism of the 'common people'. This is not necessarily to suggest that the new breed of Marxists are less dedicated than the old to the revolutionary transformation of society; their presence at the gates of the Winter Palace is perfectly conceivable, provided that satisfactory arrangements could be made for sabbatical leave.

Parkin's wit was not exclusively reserved for Marxist academics. The passage quoted below follows a sharply critical review of American theories of stratification, particularly their interpretation of Weber:

... one searches these various offerings in vain for any trace of the persistent Weberian concerns with property or state bureaucracy or class antagonisms and structural change; or for any small recognition that for Weber the "dimensions" of stratification were never regarded as aggregates of individual attributes but as "phenomena of the distribution of power." Instead, the American reality portrayed gives every appearance of a society in which property has been liquidated, classes have dissolved, and the state has withered away. It is a sociological portrait of America as drawn by Norman Rockwell for the Saturday Evening Post. One can only surmise whether Weber, if confronted with the knowledge of the things said and written in his name, would take a leaf out of his predecessor's book and declare, "Je ne suis pas Weberien".

== Published works ==
- Middle Class Radicalism (Manchester University Press, 1968)
- Class Inequality and Political Order (Granada, 1971)
- The Social Analysis of Class Structure (Tavistock Publications, 1974)
- Marxism and Class Theory (Columbia University Press, 1979)
- Class and Stratification in Socialist Societies (Open University Press, 1981)
- Max Weber (Tavistock Publications, 1982)
- Krippendorf's Tribe (Atheneum, 1985)
- The Mind and Body Shop (Atheneum, 1987)
- Durkheim (Oxford University Press, 1992)

== See also ==
- Closure (sociology)

== Notes ==
=== References ===
- Giddens, Anthony (1980). "Classes, Capitalism, and the State. A discussion of Frank Parkin, Marxism and Class Theory: A Bourgeois Critique (London: Tavistock Publications, 1979)". Theory and Society. 9 (6): 877–890. JSTOR 656806.
- Mackenzie, Gavin (1980). "Marxism and Class Theory: A Bourgeois Critique by Frank Parkin". The British Journal of Sociology. 31 (3): 582–584. doi:10.2307/589793. JSTOR 589793.
- Parkin, Frank (1979a). Marxism and Class Theory: A Bourgeois Critique. Columbia University Press. ISBN 978-0-422-76790-3.
- Parkin, Frank (1979b). "Social Stratification". In T. B. Bottomore & Robert A. Nisbet (ed.). A History of Sociological Analysis. London: Heinemann. pp. 599–632. ISBN 978-0-435-82080-0.
- Roth, Guenther (1980). "Marxism and Class Theory: A Bourgeois Critique by Frank Parkin". Contemporary Sociology. 9 (2): 306–307. doi:10.2307/2066091. JSTOR 2066091.
- Wrong, Dennis (1981). "Marxism: The Disunity of Theory and Practice". Contemporary Sociology. 10 (1): 34–40. doi:10.2307/2067798. JSTOR 2067798.
