= Coyote Waits =

1990 novel by Tony Hillerman

- First edition cover
- Author: Tony Hillerman
- Cover artist: Peter Thorpe
- Language: English
- Series: Joe Leaphorn/Jim Chee Navajo Tribal Police Series
- Genre: Detective fiction
- Published: 1990 Harper & Row
- Publication place: USA
- Media type: Print & Audio Book
- Pages: 292
- Awards: Nero Award 1991
- ISBN: 0-06-016370-4
- OCLC: 21337349
- Preceded by: Talking God (1989)
- Followed by: Sacred Clowns (1993)

Coyote Waits is a crime novel by American writer Tony Hillerman, the tenth in the Joe Leaphorn/Jim Chee Navajo Tribal Police series, first published in 1990.

It was adapted for television by PBS in 2003.

Chee is slow to go to the aid of another officer, Nez, who radios that he has found the person doing spray-paint vandalism on rock formations. Chee gets burned pulling Nez from his burning police vehicle. Leaphorn is brought into the case by two women, one the niece of and the other a professor who interviews Ashie Pinto, the main suspect. Ambitious historians and a Vietnamese family resettled in the US after the Vietnam War are intertwined in the crimes committed, as Chee and Leaphorn work together, sometimes going to places considered taboo by Navajo culture.

== Plot summary ==
Officers Chee and Nez agree to meet at Red Rock trading post for a break from patrol. Chee hears Nez laughing on the radio about seeing the person who has been defacing local rock formations with paint, so takes his break. Chee realizes he should be with Nez. He passes one vehicle en route to finding Nez in his burning patrol car. Chee uses the fire extinguisher and then pulls Nez out of the still-burning car. Chee is severely burned and Nez is dead from a gunshot, as well as burned. Chee finds Hosteen Ashie Pinto walking on the road, holding an expensive bottle of brandy, and a gun recently shot; he is drunk and says he is ashamed, in Navajo. Chee arrests him.

Lieutenant Joe Leaphorn is pulled into this case by two women: Mrs. Keeyani, the niece of Ashie Pinto and a clan relative to Leaphorn, and Professor Louisa Bourebonette, who works with Pinto for her scholarly research and an upcoming book. Pinto is a crystal gazer and recalls stories in detail. They are sure Ashie Pinto is not guilty. Mrs. Keeyani describes her uncle's struggle with whiskey, which long ago led him to murder a man and a vow to stop drinking. Leaphorn learns that money-short Pinto got a letter from history professor Tagert at McGinnis's trading post, unknown to his niece. McGinnis read it and sent Pinto's reply agreeing to work. From Agent Kennedy, Leaphorn learns that the FBI investigation avoided talking to the owner of the vehicle that passed Jim Chee, because Huan Ji came to the US under the protection of the CIA. Arriving to talk with Ji, Leaphorn learns Ji was murdered. Ji left two messages on his wall: save Taka, and Lied to Chee. Leaphorn and Bourebonette find the place in the photographs in the darkroom at the Ji home. Going to the vantage point of the photos, they see that the paint vandalism was the teenage son Taka's message to the girl he loves: 'I love Jen' is visible from her home.

Jim Chee was seriously burned, and is only recently released from the hospital in Albuquerque. Janet Pete, back from Washington D.C., visits Chee at the burn unit. She is an attorney for defendants in federal trials and Ashie Pinto is her client, though he tells her nothing about what happened. Chee promises to quit once the trial is over, disgusted at his failure to assist Nez immediately. He learns of Pinto's links to Professor Tagert and that Tagert's research interest is Butch Cassidy's true final resting place. Tapes made by Pinto tell a story indicating Cassidy and his fellow bandit died on the reservation decades ago. Chee meets Odell Redd, a graduate student in languages, who also works with Tagert. Chee visits Huan Ji, who says it was his car, but does not recall passing Chee's police vehicle, which was not credible.

After Ji is found murdered, Leaphorn and Captain Largo call on Chee to learn why his name is in the message on the wall. Chee is angered by Leaphorn's involvement. Leaphorn explains how he was drawn into the case. The three lawmen realize that Ji's son was driving the car, and they need to learn what he saw when Nez was killed. Taka Ji saw three people enter the area, and waited to leave, so they would not see his car. One was Pinto, who sat drinking from his bottle, while the other two went farther into the rock formation. He heard a gunshot. He saw Nez's car. Realizing Pinto was drunk, Taka left, passing Chee's car with its flashing lights. Taka marks on a large map exactly where he saw those three people.

Chee drives back to Shiprock area to the site. He finds the mummified old corpses, sees a saddle and a saddlebag. The spot is home to many rattlesnakes, which Chee handles safely. After failing to get the saddlebag, he turns to see drag marks and a third, more recent corpse, Professor Tagert. Right next to him is Odell Redd, pointing Cassidy's old gun at Chee. Redd drove the three originally, and disagreed with Tagert on how to handle this historical find: recognition versus wealth. When Tagert marched Redd out with his gun, Pinto took the gun and shot Tagert. Redd drove away. Thus Chee found Pinto walking down the road, saying he is ashamed. Learning that Taka Ji was the driver of that vehicle, Redd rues murdering the father. Redd now reaches for the saddlebag, and the perturbed rattlesnake bites him on the neck. Chee leaves, as Redd still holds the pistol. Redd reaches his vehicle and drives off. Chee's vehicle was disabled by Redd, so Chee walks to Red Rock trading post. He then flies to Albuquerque for the court case opening that morning. Before Chee can reach Janet Pete with what he learned overnight, Ashie Pinto makes his statement before judge and jury. He describes the effect of whiskey on him, and confesses to the murders of Tagert and Nez. He makes a plea that all whiskey be poured away.

Redd is found dead in his car by the side of the road. Janet Pete sees Chee differently and hugs him in public. Leaphorn, cleaning all paperwork off his desk, is ready to take a vacation trip, and he calls Professor Bourebonette to ask if she would accompany him on a trip to China.

== Characters ==
- Joe Leaphorn: Lieutenant in Navajo Tribal Police at Window Rock, Arizona office, widowed one year.
- Jim Chee: Officer in Navajo Tribal Police, at Shiprock, New Mexico office, reports to Captain Largo.
- Jay Kennedy: Long time FBI agent in charge for Gallup, New Mexico, who has often worked with Leaphorn.
- Captain Largo: Based at Shiprock office of Navajo Tribal Police, long-time associate of Leaphorn.
- Delbert Nez: Officer who works out of Window Rock, shot and killed in the line of duty.
- Shirley Thompson: Young clerk at Red Rock trading post, of the Towering House clan.
- Janet Pete: Half-Navajo lawyer recently returned to the reservation from Washington D.C., counsel for defenders in federal cases (under Department of Justice), and assigned to Hosteen Ashie Pinto.
- Ashie Pinto: Gray-haired Hosteen, about 80 years old, who recalls stories and myths of Navajos during his own life and stories told to him by his elders. He works with academics interested in history or myths. He is an alcoholic who goes long times without drinking. He is a crystal gazer, who helps people find lost items.
- Mary Keeyani: Niece to Hosteen Ashie Pinto and relative in the Turning Mountain clan of the late Emma Leaphorn, Joe's wife.
- Louisa Bourebonette: Professor of American studies at Northern Arizona University in Flagstaff who is writing a book on the changes in witchcraft beliefs over time, working closely with Hosteen Ashie Pinto. She is a small, gray-haired woman who speaks with a slight Southern drawl.
- Christopher Tagert: Professor of history with a specialty in the history of Western US views of the law. He has worked with Hosteen Ashie Pinto and has not appeared for his duties in the current term. He strives for recognition in his field, and has a theory about what really happened to Butch Cassidy.
- Jean Jacobs: Teaching assistant and doctoral student assigned to Prof. Tagert, who deals with all those wanting to speak with the missing professor. She likes Odell Redd.
- William Odell Redd: Doctoral student in Albuquerque. He is now a linguist in Navajo and other languages, having given up history as a field to gain him a job. He did the translations of Pinto's tapes of old stories for the university library. He has interest in coins and stamps. He tells a lot of lies to Chee.
- John 'Shorty' McGinnis: Runs the Short Mountain trading post these last 40 or 50 years in a sparsely settled area, who receives mail for Hosteen Ashie Pinto.
- Huan Ji: Teacher of mathematics at high school in Shiprock. He settled in the US after the Vietnam war, when he worked for both Saigon and the US as a colonel in the army of South Vietnam, and a special friend of the CIA, per Agent Kennedy. He likes to take photographs.
- Taka Ji: Teenage son of Huan Ji who attends the high school. His hobby is photography, developing his photos in his home darkroom.
- Theodore Rostick: Young FBI agent recently assigned to Farmington, New Mexico office.
- Janice Ha: cousin of Taka Ji in Albuquerque, where he lives after the death of his father.
- Jennifer D: Navajo girl, junior in the Shiprock high school, for whom Taka paints his message.
- Judge Downy: Federal judge in Albuquerque for Pinto's trial.

== Allusions to real events and people ==
Butch Cassidy and his Hole in the Wall and Wild Bunch gangs were real bandits in the US West in the late 19th and early 20th century. It is thought that the last two (Cassidy and his friend The Sundance Kid) died in Bolivia in 1908, having run from the US for so much law breaking across the West. The novel uses a different story of his ending, dying after a train robbery in Utah in 1909 based on stories told to the old Navajo Hosteen Ashie Pinto in his younger days, with details so precise he can lead the ambitious history professor to their desert-baked corpses. The Navajo story centered on the Navajo clan who encountered the men, who chose to enter an area considered taboo, full of Navajo witches and skinwalkers, (also discussed in Hillerman's earlier novel Skinwalkers) and needed cleansing ceremonies after the white men were found dead.

The novel also refers to the Vietnam War, which ended in 1975. The US was heavily involved in this battle between the north and south parts of the now united nation. US involvement was based on blocking the spread of communism in the world, reflected in the novel by Taca's aunt saying that Huan Ji was killed by communists, a remark dismissed by Taca's cousin, longer in the US. Many south Vietnamese people who worked closely with the US military came to the US at the war's end, fifteen years prior to this novel, or more slowly in the years following the war.

== Allusions to real places ==
This novel is set in the American Southwest, on the Navajo Nation and the cities in or near it. Shiprock, New Mexico and Window Rock, Arizona are two cities on the reservation, about 100–110 miles apart depending on the roads used. Window Rock serves as the capital and seat of government of the Navajo Nation. Albuquerque, New Mexico is the location of the federal court, and the University of New Mexico campus and hospital, and located to the east of both Shiprock and Window Rock. From Shiprock to Albuquerque, a trip often covered by Jim Chee in the novel, it is about 270 miles distance on the ground. Professor Bourebonette is based in Flagstaff, Arizona, about 188 miles west of Window Rock. The Short Mountain Trading Post is fictional, but meant to serve the far north and western part of the reservation where population is sparse. The trading post and its owner John "Shorty" McGinnis were first mentioned in Listening Woman, the third novel in this series.

== Geography ==
In his 2011 book Tony Hillerman's Navajoland: Hideouts, Haunts, and Havens in the Joe Leaphorn and Jim Chee Mysteries, author Laurance D. Linford has listed the following 76 geographical locations, real and fictional, mentioned in Coyote Waits.

- Abajo Mountains, Utah
- Albuquerque, New Mexico
- Aztec, New Mexico
- Barber Peak, New Mexico
- Beautiful Mountain, New Mexico
- Beclabito, New Mexico
- Bird Springs, Arizona
- Bisti (Badlands and Trading Post), New Mexico
- Black Mesa, Arizona
- Blanding, Utah
- Blue Hill, New Mexico
- Blue Moon Bench, Arizona
- Carrizo Mountains, Arizona
- Cedar Ridge Trading Post, Arizona
- Ceniza Mesa, Arizona
- Chaco Mesa, New Mexico
- Chuska Mountains, New Mexico and Arizona
- Colorado River, Colorado, Utah and Arizona
- Coppermine, Arizona
- Coppermine Mesa, Arizona
- Coppermine Trading Post, Arizona
- Cortez, Colorado
- Coyote Canyon, New Mexico
- Coyote Wash, New Mexico
- Cross Canyon (Trading Post), Arizona
- Crownpoint, New Mexico
- Crystal, New Mexico
- El Malpais National Monument, New Mexico
- Farmington, New Mexico
- Flagstaff, Arizona
- Fry Creek, Utah
- Gallup, New MexicoGallup, New Mexico
- Gap Trading Post, Arizona
- Hopi Buttes, AZ
- Huerfano Mesa, New Mexico
- Jadito Wash, Arizona
- Jemez Mountains, New Mexico
- Jicarilla Apache Reservation, New Mexico
- Kayenta, Arizona
- Kinleechee, Arizona
- Ladron Butte (fictitious location)
- Leupp, Arizona
- Little Water Wash, New Mexico
- Montezuma Creek, Utah
- Monument Valley, Utah and Arizona
- Mount Taylor, New Mexico
- Nakaibito (also Mexican Springs), New Mexico
- Narbona Pass, New Mexico
- Newcomb, New Mexico
- Red Lake, Arizona
- Red Mesa, Arizona
- Red Mesa Chapter, Arizona
- Red Rock, Arizona
- Red Rock Trading Post, Arizona
- Rol Hai Rock, New Mexico
- Sand Island, Utah
- San Juan Basin, New Mexico
- San Juan Mountains, Colorado
- San Juan River, Colorado, New Mexico and Utah
- Sanostee, New Mexico
- Shiprock (Community), New Mexico
- Shiprock (Pinnacle), New Mexico
- Short Mountain Trading Post (fictitious location)
- Sleeping Ute Mountain, Colorado
- Sweetwater, Arizona
- Sweetwater Trading Post, Arizona
- Table Mesa, New Mexico
- Thieving Rock, New Mexico
- Tse A’digash (fictitious location)
- Tsitah Wash, Utah and Arizona
- Tuba City, Arizona
- Twentynine Mile Canyon and Wash, Arizona
- Window Rock, Arizona
- Ya Tah Hey, New Mexico
- Yon Dot Mountains, Arizona
- Zuni Mountains, New Mexico

== Title ==
The coyote is a major figure in Navajo culture and in Navajo mythology. He is a trickster, but if one has done wrong, coyote is always there, waiting.

== Adaptations ==
The novel was adapted for television in November 2003 and was directed by Jan Egleson. It aired as part of PBS's Mystery! series. The film starred Adam Beach as Chee and Wes Studi as Leaphorn. It also featured Jimmy Herman, Alex Rice, Graham Greene, Sheila Tousey, Keith Carradine and Gary Farmer. The filming locations were in New Mexico.

== Awards ==
Coyote Waits received the Nero Award in 1991. The award was last given in 1987, until this novel merited recognition in 1991.

== Reviews ==
Writing in The New York Times, Robert Gish says of Tony Hillerman's writing:

The growing number of readers who await Tony Hillerman's latest Navajo mystery novel are always rewarded. And the wait is never long; the series now approaches a dozen volumes. In his Joe Leaphorn and Jim Chee mysteries, Mr. Hillerman demonstrates that he is a natural storyteller, a word man who knows the mystery novel and the fun of both his stories and their telling. He expands the boundaries of his special form - the detective Western - and shares with readers the power of words in the ratiocinations of his detectives and in the Native American culture about which he writes.

Gish finds several dramatic climaxes in this novel:

How Chee and Leaphorn, from their respective professional and personal motives and points of view, arrive at the truth about Nez's murder makes for some contrived but ingenious plotting. Questions are answered and the truth divulged in several dramatic climaxes. ... The rewards in Mr. Hillerman's detective-Western hybrid include ample amounts of regional description (Albuquerque, northern New Mexico and the Navajo reservation), of Indian myth and of villainy. And in this book, the author continues to prove himself one of the nation's most convincing and authentic interpreters of Navajo culture, as well as one of our best and most innovative modern mystery writers. Mr. Hillerman's Navajos are at once a part of their own tribal heritage and also well assimilated into the dominant culture. An extra payoff of Coyote Waits is an ever so light-handed but utterly convincing advocacy of Native American culture and an enchanting depiction of the spirit of the Southwest.

Josh Rubins of Entertainment Weekly finds that Hillerman keeps up his high quality writing:

Will success spoil Tony Hillerman? Apparently not ... he continues to write the same sort of gently impressive mystery fiction he has always written: a little slow, a little somber, yet gripping too — thanks to the steady uncoiling of grim secrets, the constant tension between Navajo mysticism and contemporary American values ... As always, Hillerman fills out the policework here with starkly memorable landscapes and firm nuances of character — like Jim Chee's ever-changing friendship with Janet Pete, the Navajo-born, city-trained lawyer who (by forgivable coincidence) winds up defending Ashie Pinto. So, though Coyote Waits features one of the series' least dramatic plots, it's sturdy work from an incorruptible craftsman — and cause for quiet celebration.

John M. Reilly compares the plotting in this novel to Talking God, the prior novel in the series: "But remember that invocation of fate is the solution to the puzzle, not the novel's plot. Coyote Waits may be slighter and less interestingly developed than Talking God, and it is perhaps less satisfying to read because it becomes a demonstration of coincidence rather than dependent order. In plot, however, the two novels are closely related examples of the detection puzzle."

Mark Schorr writing in the Chicago Tribune notes the plot elements of Coyote Waits: the legend of Coyote, the drunken shaman with the fantastic memory for tribal lore, the Southeast Asian teacher with links to the CIA in the Vietnam era, the FBI, competing researchers in academia, and Butch Cassidy. He says that "The climax has a touch of deus ex machina, but Hillerman's strong suit of compelling characters in a fascinating setting make the novel a treat. His mysteries allow a reader to feel that they`re not just reading a good yarn but also learning a great deal about Native American culture."

== Sources ==
- Linford, Laurance D. (2011). "Index of Places by Hillerman Title". Tony Hillerman's Navajoland: Hideouts, Haunts, and Havens in the Joe Leaphorn and Jim Chee Mysteries. University of Utah Press. ISBN 978-1-60781-988-2 – via Project MUSE.
