= Hopi Buttes volcanic field =

Monogenetic volcanic field in Arizona

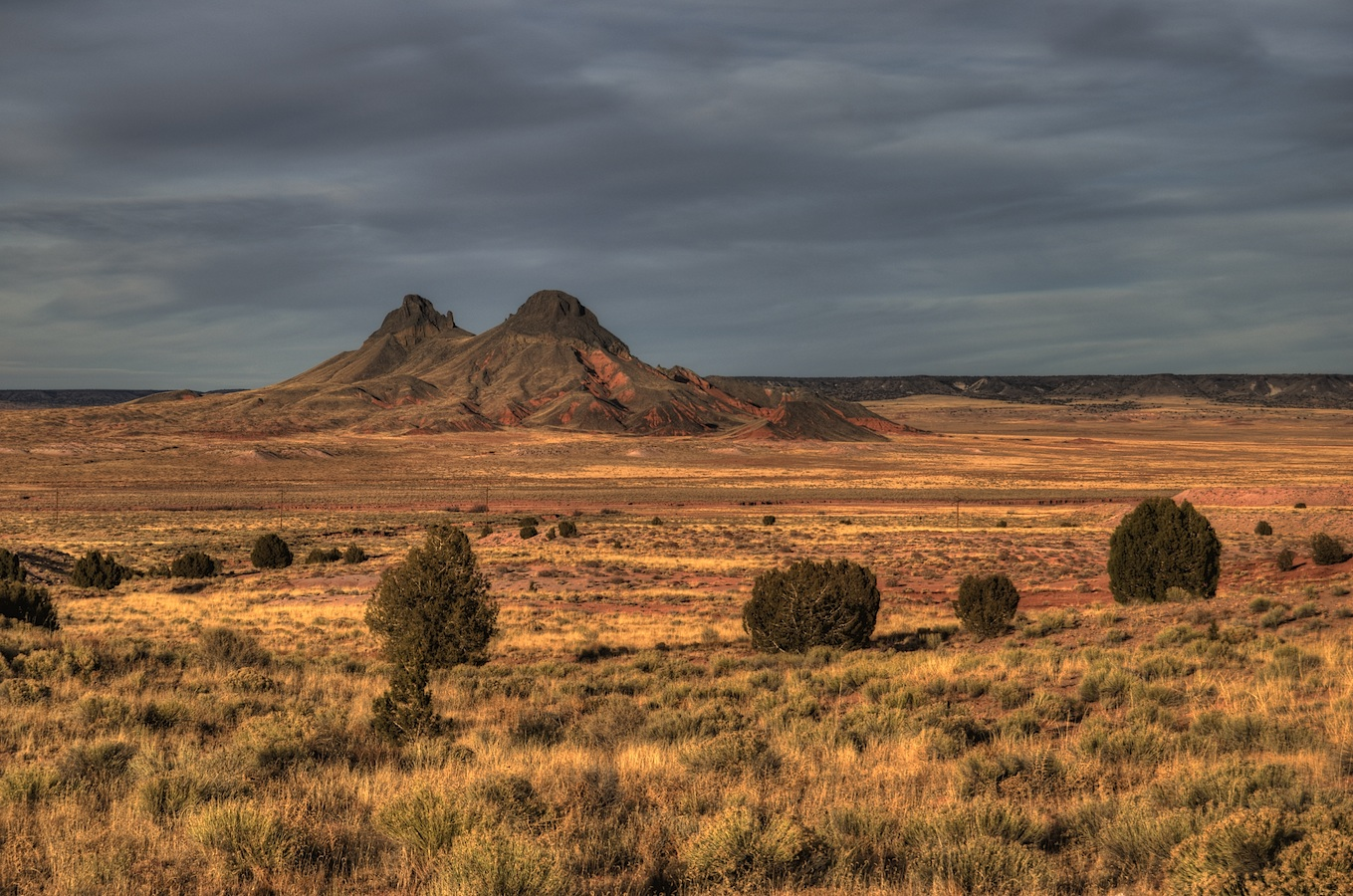
Hopi Buttes, about 30 miles SE of First Mesa

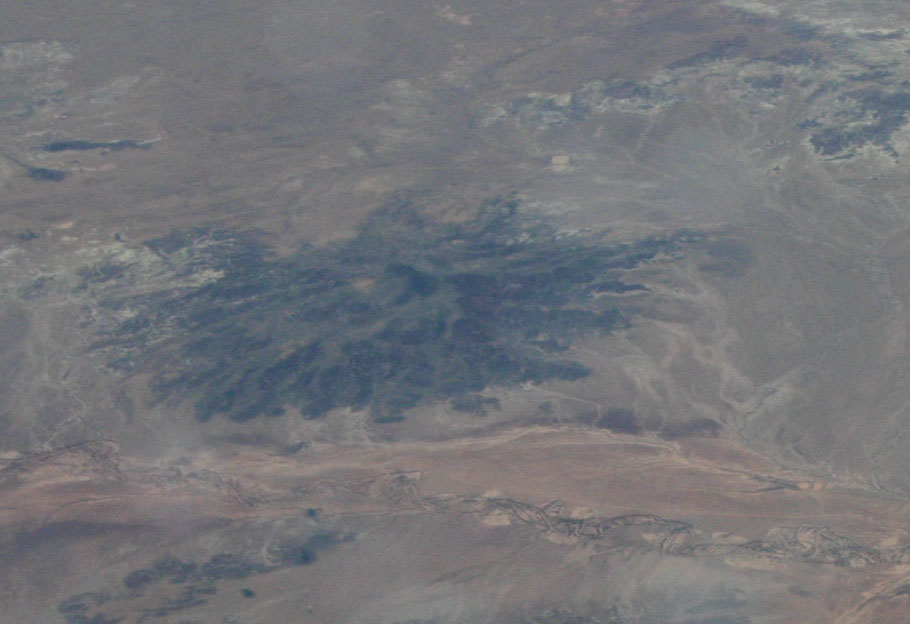
Oblique air photo of Flying Butte, facing approximately south

Hopi Buttes volcanic field is a monogenetic volcanic field located on the Colorado Plateau mostly on the Navajo Reservation around the town of Dilkon in northeastern Arizona north of Holbrook.

The volcanic field covers an area of approximately 965 square miles (2,500 km^{2}) and contains about 300 maars and diatremes.

The erosional exposure of the deposits varies with those in the eastern portion exhibiting the shallowly eroded maar deposits and those in the western portion the more deeply eroded feeder diatremes. The maars result from explosive interaction of the hot diatreme material with the groundwater system and result in a mixture of volcanic tuff material and sediments of the Miocene–Pliocene lacustrine sediments of the Bidahochi Formation. In the western portion of the field the buttes consist of the feeder diatremes of monchiquite and nepheline syenite magmas.

Most of the volcanic activity occurred between 8.5 and 6 million years ago, with the most recent dated at 4.2 million years ago.

== Notable vents ==
Name	Elevation		Location	Last eruption
Name	meters	feet	Coordinates	Last eruption
Coliseum Maar	1,811	5,940	35°24′N 110°06′W	
Morale Claim Maar	1,859	6,100	35°30′N 111°00′W	

== See also ==
- List of volcanoes in the United States of America
- List of volcanic fields
