= Bidahochi, Arizona =

- Populated place
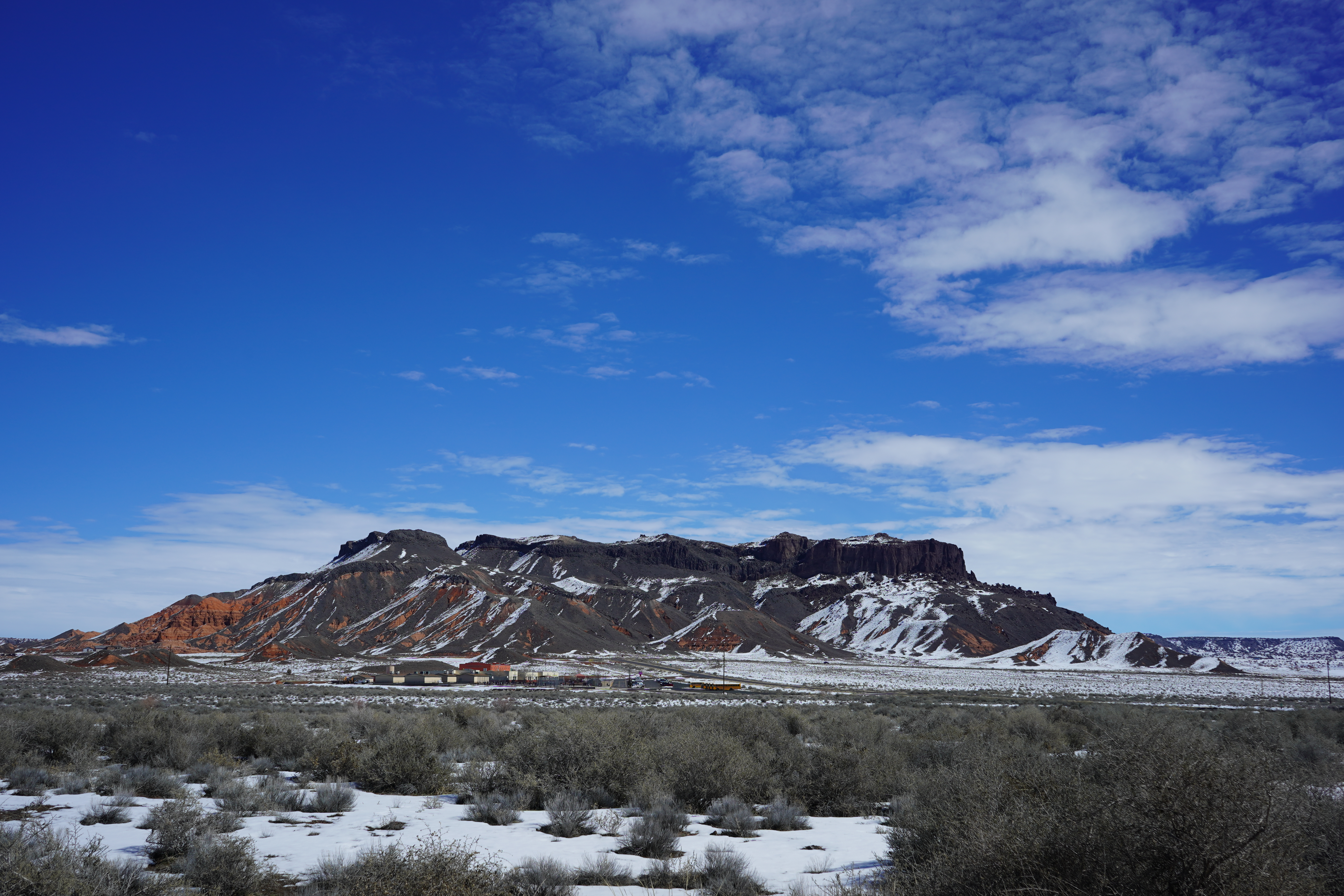
- Bidahochi Butte

- Location within the state of Arizona Bidahochi, Arizona (the United States)
- Coordinates: 35°24′37″N 110°03′42″W
- Country: United States
- State: Arizona
- County: Navajo
- Elevation: 5,758 ft (1,755 m)
- Time zone: UTC-7 (Mountain (MST))
- Area code: 928
- GNIS feature ID: 25315

Bidahochi (also known as Bitahochee) is a populated place situated in Navajo County, Arizona, United States. The nearby Bidahochi Formation was named for Bidahochi.
