= Baby Rocks, Arizona =

Populated place in Navajo County, Arizona

- Populated place
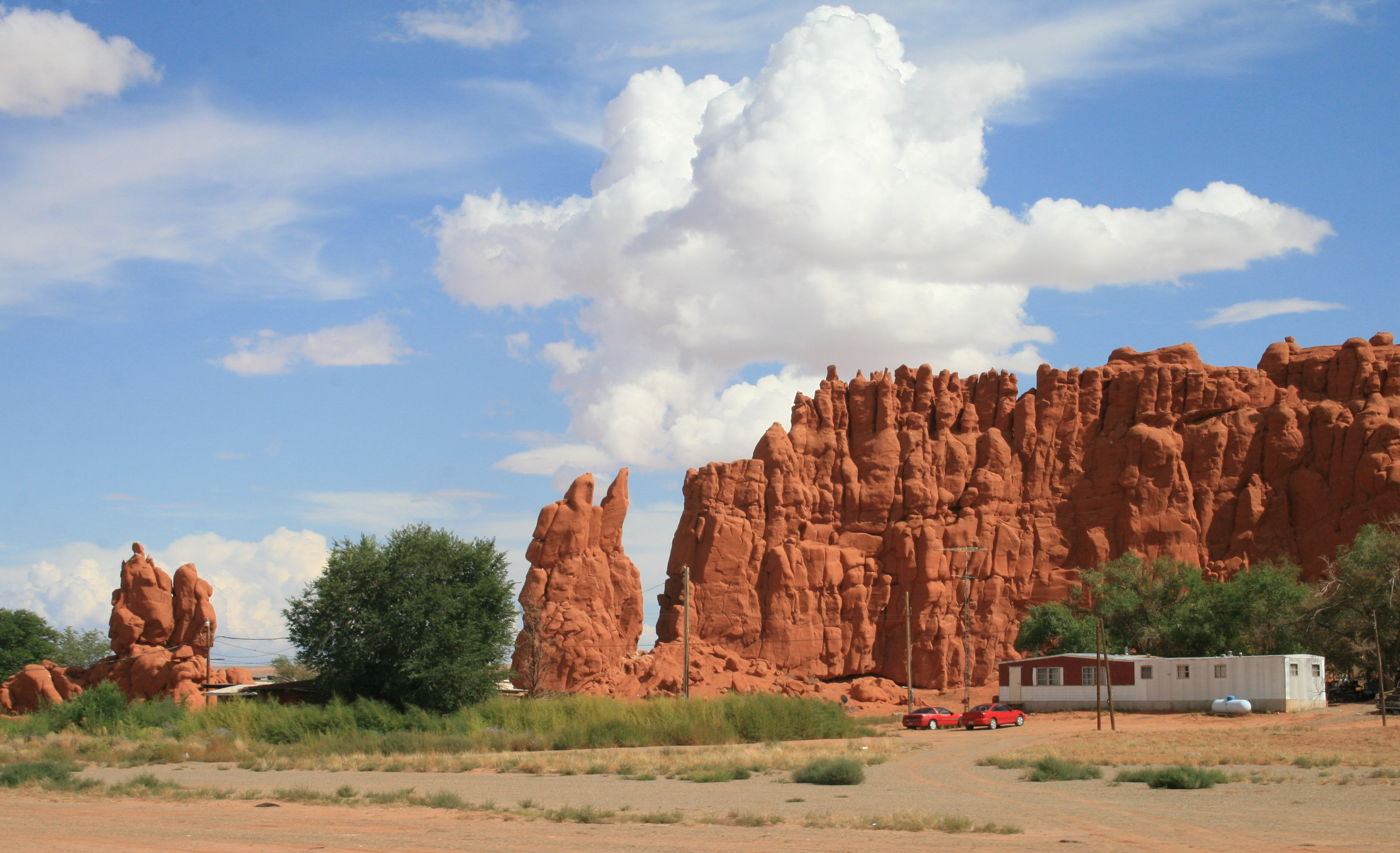
- Settlements at U.S. Route 160 in front of red cliffs

- Location of Baby Rocks in Arizona Baby Rocks (the United States)
- Coordinates: 36°46′31″N 110°00′32″W
- Country: United States
- State: Arizona
- County: Navajo
- Elevation: 5,236 ft (1,596 m)
- Time zone: UTC-7 (Mountain (MST))
  - Summer (DST): UTC-7 (MST)
- ZIP codes: 86033
- Area code: 928
- FIPS code: 04-05000
- GNIS feature ID: 25314

Baby Rocks is a populated place situated in Navajo County, Arizona, United States, and appears on the Baby Rocks U.S. Geological Survey Map.

== Notable person ==
- Sylvia Laughter, Arizona state legislator and activist, was born in Baby Rocks.
