= Robert Redford filmography =

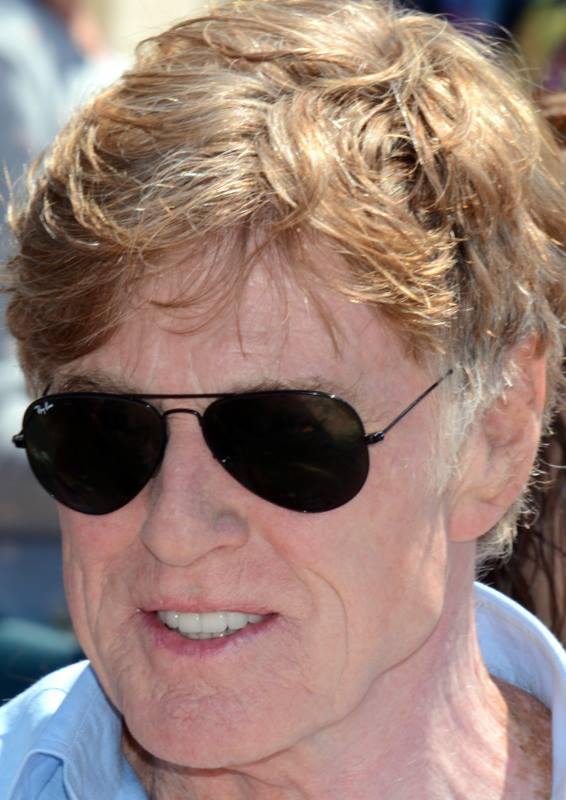
Redford at the 2013 Cannes Film Festival.

This is the filmography of American actor, director, producer and activist Robert Redford.

Redford gained prominence for his leading roles in the romantic comedy Barefoot in the Park (1967) opposite Jane Fonda and the western Butch Cassidy and the Sundance Kid (1969) alongside Paul Newman. He reunited with Newman in the 1973 caper film The Sting receiving his only nomination for the Academy Award for Best Actor. He continued his leading man status starring in the western film Jeremiah Johnson, the political drama The Candidate (both 1972), the romantic dramas The Way We Were (1973), and The Great Gatsby (1974), and the dramas Three Days of the Condor, and The Great Waldo Pepper (both 1975). The following year he starred as Bob Woodward in the Alan J. Pakula political drama All the President's Men (1976). He later appeared in the Richard Attenborough war film A Bridge Too Far (1977), and Sydney Pollack western comedy The Electric Horseman (1979).

He further established himself as a star in the Barry Levinson sports drama The Natural (1984) and the Sydney Pollack epic romance Out of Africa (1985). He continued appearing in films such as Sneakers (1992), Indecent Proposal (1993), up close and personal (1996) The Horse Whisperer (1998), An Unfinished Life (2005), All Is Lost (2013), A Walk in the Woods (2015), Pete's Dragon (2016), and The Discovery (2017). In 2014, he entered the Marvel Cinematic Universe appearing as Alexander Pierce in Captain America: Winter Soldier (2014), a role he would reprise in Avengers: Endgame (2019). In 2015, he portrayed Dan Rather in the drama Truth (2015). He reunited with Jane Fonda in the Netflix romance Our Souls at Night (2017), and had his final starring role in The Old Man & the Gun (2018).

In 1980 he made his directorial film debut with Ordinary People, which won the Academy Award for Best Picture, with Redford receiving the Academy Award for Best Director. He continued directing films including The Milagro Beanfield War (1988), A River Runs Through It (1992), Quiz Show (1994), The Horse Whisperer (1998), The Legend of Bagger Vance (2000), Lions for Lambs (2007), The Conspirator (2010), and The Company You Keep (2012). In 2002 he received the Academy Honorary Award as an "Actor, director, producer, creator of Sundance, inspiration to independent and innovative filmmakers everywhere."

== Film ==
=== Acting roles ===
Year	Title	Role	Director	Notes
1960	Tall Story	Basketball Player	Joshua Logan	Uncredited
1962	War Hunt	Private Roy Loomis	Denis Sanders	
1965	Inside Daisy Clover	Wade Lewis	Robert Mulligan	
1965	Situation Hopeless... But Not Serious	Capt. Hank Wilson	Gottfried Reinhardt	
1966	This Property Is Condemned	Owen Legate	Sydney Pollack	
1966	The Chase	Charlie 'Bubber' Reeves	Arthur Penn	
1967	Barefoot in the Park	Paul Bratter	Gene Saks	
1969	Butch Cassidy and the Sundance Kid	Sundance Kid	George Roy Hill	
1969	Tell Them Willie Boy Is Here	Dept. Sheriff Christopher 'Coop' Cooper	Abraham Polonsky	
1969	Downhill Racer	David Chappellet	Michael Ritchie	
1970	Little Fauss and Big Halsy	Halsy Knox	Sidney J. Furie	
1972	Jeremiah Johnson	Jeremiah Johnson	Sydney Pollack	
1972	The Candidate	Bill McKay	Michael Ritchie	
1972	The Hot Rock	John Archibald Dortmunder	Peter Yates	
1973	The Sting	Johnny Hooker	George Roy Hill	
1973	The Way We Were	Hubbell Gardiner	Sydney Pollack	
1974	The Great Gatsby	Jay Gatsby	Jack Clayton	
1975	Three Days of the Condor	Joseph Turner, a.k.a. The Condor	Sydney Pollack	
1975	The Great Waldo Pepper	Waldo Pepper	George Roy Hill	
1976	All the President's Men	Bob Woodward	Alan J. Pakula	
1977	A Bridge Too Far	Major Julian Cook	Richard Attenborough	
1979	The Electric Horseman	Norman 'Sonny' Steele	Sydney Pollack	
1980	Brubaker	Henry Brubaker	Stuart Rosenberg	
1984	The Natural	Roy Hobbs	Barry Levinson	
1985	Out of Africa	Denys Finch Hatton	Sydney Pollack	
1986	Legal Eagles	Tom Logan	Ivan Reitman	
1990	Havana	Jack Weil	Sydney Pollack	
1992	Sneakers	Martin Brice, a.k.a. Marty Bishop	Phil Alden Robinson	
1992	A River Runs Through It	Voice of older Norman	Himself	Also producer
1993	Indecent Proposal	John Gage	Adrian Lyne	
1996	Up Close & Personal	Warren Justice	Jon Avnet	
1998	The Horse Whisperer	Tom Booker	Himself	Also producer
2001	The Last Castle	Lieutenant General Eugene Irwin	Rod Lurie	
2001	Spy Game	CIA Case Officer Nathan D. Muir	Tony Scott	
2004	The Clearing	Wayne Hayes	Pieter Jan Brugge	
2005	An Unfinished Life	Einar Gilkyson	Lasse Hallström	
2006	Charlotte's Web	Ike	Gary Winick	Voice
2007	Lions for Lambs	Professor Stephen Malley	Himself	Also producer
2012	The Company You Keep	Jim Grant, a.k.a. Nick Sloan	Himself	Also producer
2013	All Is Lost	Our Man	J. C. Chandor	
2014	Captain America: The Winter Soldier	Alexander Pierce	Anthony and Joe Russo	
2015	A Walk in the Woods	Bill Bryson	Ken Kwapis	Also producer
2015	Truth	Dan Rather	James Vanderbilt	
2016	Pete's Dragon	Conrad Meacham	David Lowery	
2017	The Discovery	Thomas Harbor	Charlie McDowell	
2017	Our Souls at Night	Louis Waters	Ritesh Batra	Also producer
2018	The Old Man & the Gun	Forrest Tucker	David Lowery	Also producer
2019	Avengers: Endgame	Alexander Pierce	Anthony and Joe Russo	Cameo
2020	Omniboat: A Fast Boat Fantasia	Lokia The Dolphin Monster	Various	Voice

=== Filmmaking roles ===
Year	Title	Director	Producer	Notes
1980	Ordinary People	Yes	No	
1988	The Milagro Beanfield War	Yes	Yes	
1992	A River Runs Through It	Yes	Yes	
1994	Quiz Show	Yes	Yes	
1998	The Horse Whisperer	Yes	Yes	
1998	A Civil Action	No	Yes	
2000	The Legend of Bagger Vance	Yes	Yes	
2007	Lions for Lambs	Yes	Yes	
2010	The Conspirator	Yes	Yes	
2012	The Company You Keep	Yes	Yes	
2014	Cathedrals of Culture	Yes	No	Documentary; Segment: "The Salk Institute"
2015	A Walk in the Woods	No	Yes	
2017	Our Souls at Night	No	Yes	
2018	The Old Man & the Gun	No	Yes	

Executive producer

- Promised Land (1987)
- Some Girls (1988)
- The Dark Wind (1991)
- She's the One (1996)
- No Looking Back (1998)
- Slums of Beverly Hills (1998)
- How to Kill Your Neighbor's Dog (2002)
- Love in the Time of Money (2002)
- People I Know (2002)
- The Motorcycle Diaries (2002)
- The March (2013) (Documentary)
- Drunktown's Finest (2014)
- The Adderall Diaries (2015)
- The American West (2016)
- American Epic (2017) (Documentary)
- The American Epic Sessions (2017) (Documentary)
- The Mustang (2019)

== Television ==
Year	Title	Role	Notes
1960	Maverick	Jimmy Coleman	Episode 76: "Iron Hand"
1960	Rescue 8	Danny Tilford	Episode 67: "Breakdown"
1960	The Deputy	Burt Johnson	Episode 31: "The Last Gunfight"
1960	Playhouse 90	Lieutenant Lott	Episode 134: "In the Presence of Mine Enemies"
1960	Tate	John Torsett	Episode 3: "The Bounty Hunter"
1960	Tate	Tad Dundee	Episode 8: "Comanche Scalps"
1960	Moment of Fear	Stranger	Episode 1: "The Golden Deed"
1960	Perry Mason	Dick Hart	Episode 96: "The Case of the Treacherous Toupee"
1960	The Play of the Week	Don Parritt	Episodes 8 & 9: "The Iceman Cometh"
1961	Alfred Hitchcock Presents	Charlie Pugh	Season 7 Episode 11: "The Right Kind of Medicine"
1961	Route 66	Janosh	Episode 35: "First-Class Mouliak"
1961	Whispering Smith	Johnny	Episode 2: "The Grudge"
1961	Naked City	Baldwin Larne	Episode 60: "Tombstone for a Derelict"
1962–63	The Alfred Hitchcock Hour	Chuck Marsden / David Chesterman	2 episodes
1963	Dr. Kildare	Medical Student	Episode 35: "The Burning Sky"
1963	The Twilight Zone	Harold Beldon / Death	Episode 81: Nothing in the Dark
1963	The Untouchables	Jack Parker	Episode 103: "Snowball"
1963	The Virginian	Matthew Cordell	Episode 35: "The Evil That Men Do"
1993	La Classe américaine	Steven	Television film (archive footage)
2002	Skinwalkers	—N/a	Television film; Executive producer
2004	Tanner on Tanner	Himself	Episode 1: "Dinner at Elaine's"; Episode 4: "The Awful Truth"
2023	White House Plumbers	Bob Woodward	Episode 4: "The Writer's Wife", uncredited voice cameo
2025	Dark Winds	Chess Player	Episode 13: "Ye'iitsoh (Big Monster)", uncredited cameo; also Executive producer

== Narrator ==
Year	Title	Notes
1970	The Making of Butch Cassidy and the Sundance Kid	Documentary
1971	The Language And The Music Of The Wolves	Project of The Natural History Magazine
1974	Following the Tundra Wolf	Documentary
1975	Broken Treaty at Battle Mountain	Documentary
1977	The Predators	Documentary
1983	The Sun Dagger	Documentary
1986	Audubon Video: Grizzly and Man - Uneasy Truce	Documentary
1988	Audubon Video: California Condor	Documentary
1989	Changing Steps	Documentary
1989	To Protect Mother Earth	Documentary
1990	American Experience: Yosemite - The Fate of Heaven	Documentary
1992	A River Runs Through It	Also director and producer
1992	Incident at Oglala	Documentary
1997	Mountain Climbing: Free Climb	Documentary
1998	Wallace Stegner: A Writer's Life	Documentary
1999	The Mystery of Chaco Canyon	Documentary
2004	Sacred Planet	
2006	Cosmic Collisions	Documentary
2006	Jean-Michel Cousteau: Ocean Adventures	Narrated two episodes
2008	Fighting Goliath: Texas Coal Wars	Documentary
2008	Grand Canyon Adventure: River at Risk	Documentary on the Colorado River
2009	Saving The Bay	Documentary on the San Francisco Bay
2010	Stories From The Gulf	Documentary project of NRDC
2012	The Movement: One Man Joins An Uprising	Project of the Make A Hero organization
2016	National Parks Adventure	Project of MacGillivray Freeman Films
2017	American Epic	Documentary film series
2017	Earth: One Amazing Day	BBC documentary
2018	The New Environmentalists	PBS documentary
2018	Buttons: A Christmas Tale	
