= List of awards and nominations received by Robert Redford =

Robert Redford awards and nominations
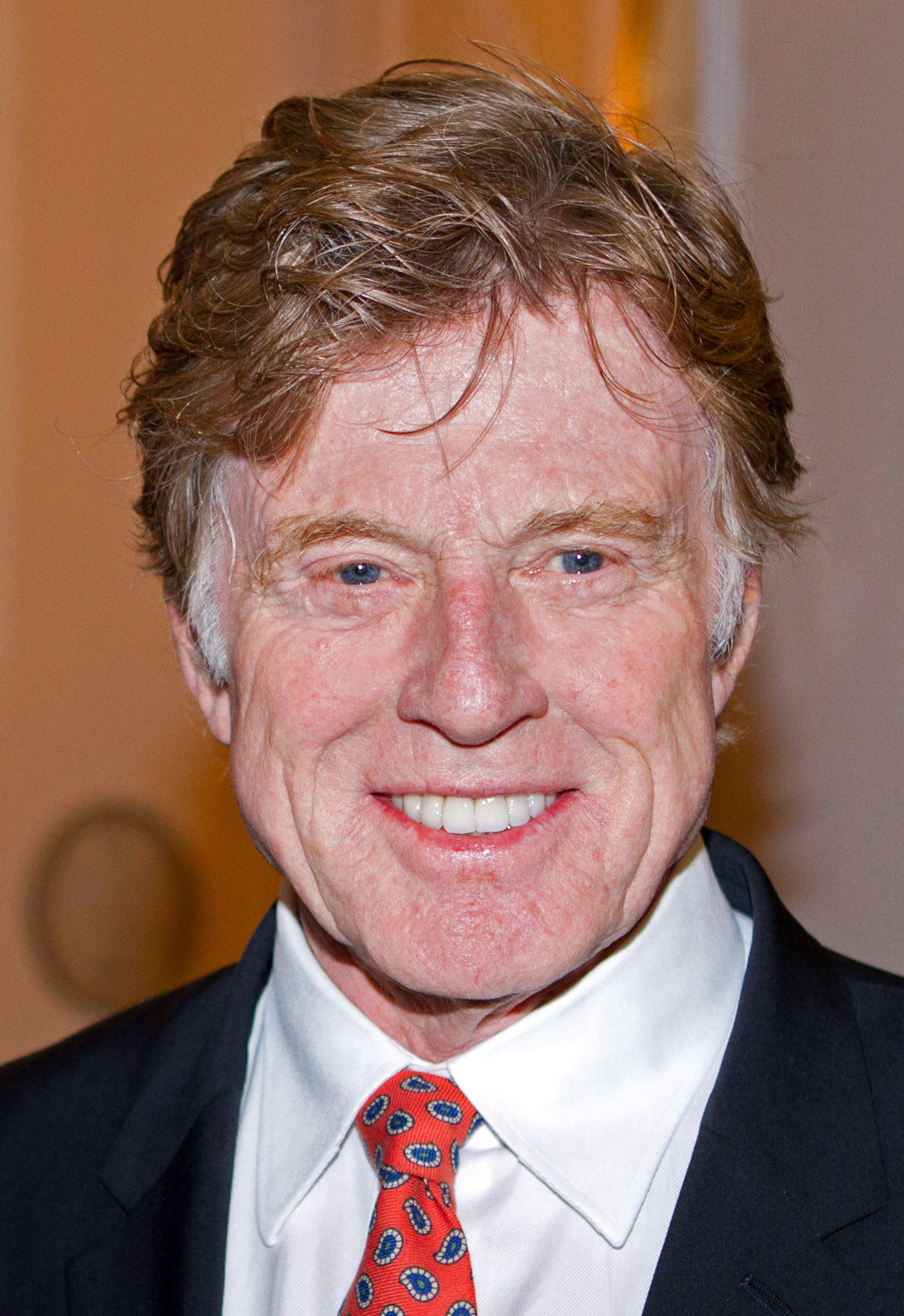
- Redford in 2012
Awards and nominations
Award	Wins	Nominations
Academy Awards	2	5
British Academy Film Awards	1	2
Golden Globe Awards	5	7
Primetime Emmy Awards	0	2
Sports Emmy Awards	0	1

Totals (Note: Certain award groups do not simply award one winner. They acknowledge several different recipients, have runners-up, and have third place. Since this is a specific recognition and is different from losing an award, runner-up mentions are considered wins in this award tally. For simplification and to avoid errors, each award in this list has been presumed to have had a prior nomination.)
- Wins: 11
- Nominations: 34

The following is a list of awards and nominations received by Robert Redford.

Robert Redford was an American actor, director and producer. He is best known as a leading man during the American New Wave. He received various awards including an Academy Award, a British Academy Film Award, and five Golden Globe Awards as well as nominations for two Primetime Emmy Awards, a Sports Emmy Awards, a Critics' Choice Movie Award, and an Independent Spirit Award. He also received various honors including the Golden Globe Cecil B. DeMille Award in 1994, the Screen Actors Guild Life Achievement Award in 1996, the Academy Honorary Award in 2002, the Kennedy Center Honors in 2005, the Presidential Medal of Freedom in 2016, and the Honorary César in 2019.

Redford made his film debut in War Hunt (1962) and for his role in Inside Daisy Clover (1965), he won the Golden Globe Award for New Star of the Year – Actor. In 1970 he won the BAFTA Award for Best Actor in a Leading Role for his roles in the western buddy film Butch Cassidy and the Sundance Kid, the western Tell Them Willie Boy Is Here, and the drama Downhill Racer. He was first nominated for an Academy Award for Best Actor for his role as Johnny "Kelly" Hooker in the George Roy Hill crime caper film The Sting (1973).

As a director, he gained acclaim for the family drama Ordinary People (1980), for which he also earned the Academy Award for Best Director, Golden Globe Award for Best Director, and the Directors Guild of America Award for Outstanding Directing – Feature Film. He also directed the historical drama Quiz Show (1994), for which he received two Academy Award nominations for Best Picture and Best Director. He was also Golden Globe-nominated for directing A River Runs Through It (1992) and The Horse Whisperer (1998). He returned to acting in the survival drama All Is Lost (2013) and the biographical crime dramedy The Old Man and the Gun (2018) both of which earned him Golden Globe-nominations.

On theater, he acted in the Norman Krasna romantic comedy play Sunday in New York (1962) for which he won the Theatre World Award. On television, he was nominated for the Primetime Emmy Award for Outstanding Supporting Actor in a Drama Series for Alcoa Premiere (1963) and the Primetime Emmy Award for Outstanding Documentary or Nonfiction Special for All the President's Men Revisited (2013).

== Major associations ==
=== Academy Awards ===
Year	Category	Nominated work	Result	Ref.
1974	Best Actor	The Sting	Nominated	
1981	Best Director	Ordinary People	Won	
1995	Best Picture	Quiz Show	Nominated	
1995	Best Director	Quiz Show	Nominated	
2002	Academy Honorary Award		Honored	

=== BAFTA Awards ===
British Academy Film Awards
Year	Category	Nominated work	Result	Ref.
1971	Best Actor in a Leading Role	Butch Cassidy and the Sundance Kid / Tell Them Willie Boy Is Here / Downhill Racer	Won	
1995	Best Film	Quiz Show	Nominated	

=== Emmy Awards ===
Primetime Emmy Awards
Year	Category	Nominated work	Result	Ref.
1963	Outstanding Supporting Role by an Actor	Alcoa Premiere (Episode: "The Voice of Charlie Pont")	Nominated	
2013	Outstanding Documentary or Nonfiction Special	All the President's Men Revisited	Nominated	
Sports Emmy Awards
2019	Outstanding Long Sports Documentary	Momentum Generation	Nominated	

=== Golden Globe Awards ===
Year	Category	Nominated work	Result	Ref.
1966	New Star of the Year – Actor	Inside Daisy Clover	Won	
1975	World Film Favorite – Actor	—N/a	Won	
1977	World Film Favorite – Actor	—N/a	Won	
1978	World Film Favorite – Actor	—N/a	Won	
1981	Best Director	Ordinary People	Won	
1993	Best Director	A River Runs Through It	Nominated	
1994	Cecil B. DeMille Award		Honored	
1995	Best Director	Quiz Show	Nominated	
1999	Best Director	The Horse Whisperer	Nominated	
2014	Best Actor in a Motion Picture – Drama	All Is Lost	Nominated	
2019	Best Actor in a Motion Picture – Musical or Comedy	The Old Man & the Gun	Nominated	

=== Actor Awards ===
Year	Category	Nominated work	Result	Ref.
1996	Life Achievement Award		Honored	

=== César Awards ===
Year	Category	Nominated work	Result	Ref.
2019	Honorary César		Honored	

== Miscellaneous accolades ==
=== Directors Guild of America Awards ===
Year	Category	Nominated work	Result	Ref.
1980	Outstanding Directorial Achievement in Motion Pictures	Ordinary People	Won	
1994	Outstanding Directorial Achievement in Motion Pictures	Quiz Show	Nominated	

=== Golden Raspberry Awards ===
Year	Category	Nominated work	Result	Ref.
1993	Worst Actor	Indecent Proposal	Nominated	

== Film critic awards ==
Year	Award	Category	Nominated work	Result	Ref.
2013	Chicago Film Critics Association Awards	Best Actor	All Is Lost	Nominated	
2013	Critics' Choice Movie Awards	Best Actor	All Is Lost	Nominated	
2013	Detroit Film Critics Society Awards	Best Actor	All Is Lost	Nominated	
2013	National Society of Film Critics Awards	Best Actor	All Is Lost	Nominated	
2013	New York Film Critics Circle Awards	Best Actor	All Is Lost	Won	
2013	Phoenix Film Critics Society Awards	Best Actor	All Is Lost	Nominated	
2013	San Francisco Bay Area Film Critics Circle Awards	Best Actor	All Is Lost	Nominated	
2013	Washington D.C. Area Film Critics Association Awards	Best Actor	All Is Lost	Nominated	

== Other awards ==
Year	Award	Category	Nominated work	Result	Ref.
1962	Theatre World Awards		Sunday in New York	Won	
2013	Independent Spirit Awards	Best Male Lead	All Is Lost	Nominated	
2013	Satellite Awards	Best Actor	All Is Lost	Nominated	
2019	Morelia International Film Festival	Artistic Excellence Award		Won	

== Accolades for features directed by Redford ==
Year	Feature Picture	Academy Awards		BAFTAs		Golden Globes	
Year	Feature Picture	Nominations	Wins	Nominations	Wins	Nominations	Wins
1980	Ordinary People	6	4	2		8	5
1988	The Milagro Beanfield War	1	1			1	
1992	A River Runs Through It	3	1			1	
1994	Quiz Show	4		3	1	4	
1998	The Horse Whisperer	1				2	
Total		15	6	5	1	16	5

Directed Academy Award performances
Under Redford's direction, these actors have received Academy Award wins and nominations for their performances in their respective roles.

Year	Performer	Film	Result
Academy Award for Best Actress
1980	Mary Tyler Moore	Ordinary People	Nominated
Academy Award for Best Supporting Actor
1980	Judd Hirsch	Ordinary People	Nominated
1980	Timothy Hutton	Ordinary People	Won
1994	Paul Scofield	Quiz Show	Nominated
