= Sidney Armus =

American actor (1924–2002)

- Born: December 19, 1924; New York City, U.S.
- Died: June 21, 2002 (aged 77); New York City, U.S.
- Occupation: Actor
- Spouse: Sondra Lee (m. 1953; divorced)

Sidney Armus (December 19, 1924 – June 21, 2002) was an American actor.

== Biography ==
Born in the Bronx, New York City, he made his Broadway debut in the original production of the musical South Pacific in 1949. While studying with Erwin Piscator at the Dramatic Workshop of The New School for Social Research, he was seen in The Flies, There is No End, and Crew 55

Sidney played the character of "Itchy" Flexner, the social director, in the Broadway production of the musical comedy Wish You Were Here which opened at the Imperial Theatre on June 25, 1952, and closed on November 28, 1953, after 598 performances. Wish You Were Here is a musical with a book by Arthur Kober and Joshua Logan and music and lyrics by Harold Rome. The musical was adapted from Kober's 1937 play, Having Wonderful Time, and revolves around a summer camp for adults. Other Broadway productions Sidney appeared in were The Flowering Peach (1954), The Cold Wind and the Warm (1958), and Harold (1962).

In films, Armus had roles in Sleepless in Seattle, One Fine Day, Postcards from the Edge, and The Thomas Crown Affair. In television he appeared on Columbo, Kojak, and The Defenders, as well as many early 1950s television dramas such as Goodyear Playhouse and The United States Steel Hour. In the early 90s, Armus appeared in several Law & Order episodes playing various judges. In his later career he owned and operated Theatre 22, an off-off-Broadway theater in New York City, where he directed plays.

He died in 2002 in Manhattan, New York City.

== Filmography ==
Year	Title	Role	Notes
1968	The Thomas Crown Affair	Arnie	
1971	Who Is Harry Kellerman and Why Is He Saying Those Terrible Things About Me?	Marvin	
1976	Nickelodeon	Judge	
1986	Heartburn	Jeweler	
1987	Making Mr. Right	Jeweler	
1987	The Pick-up Artist	Sidney	
1990	Postcards from the Edge	Sid Roth	
1992	This Is My Life	Morris Chesler	
1993	Sleepless in Seattle	Information Booth Man	
1994	Mixed Nuts	Chris's Father	
1996	Night Falls on Manhattan	Judge	
1996	One Fine Day	Mayor Aikens	
1996	I'm Not Rappaport	Grocery Customer	
1999	Gloria	Pharmacist	
