= China's Little Devils =

1945 war film directed by Monta Bell

- Film poster
- Directed by: Monta Bell
- Written by: Samuel Ornitz
- Produced by: Grant Withers
- Starring: Harry Carey; Paul Kelly "Ducky" Louie
- Cinematography: Harry Neumann
- Edited by: Richard C. Currier
- Music by: Dmitri Tiomkin
- Production company: Monogram Pictures
- Distributed by: Monogram Pictures
- Release date: May 27, 1945
- Running time: 74 minutes
- Country: United States
- Language: English

China's Little Devils (aka Little Devils) is a 1945 war film, directed by Monta Bell and starring Harry Carey, Paul Kelly and "Ducky" Louie. It is one of a number of Hollywood films dealing with the exploits of the Flying Tigers that began with the Republic Pictures production Flying Tigers (1942).

== Plot ==
After being shot down, "Big Butch" Dooley, a Flying Tigers pilot, lands his Curtiss P-40 Warhawk in the ruins of a Chinese village. He rescues a wounded boy, orphaned by the war, and takes him back to his unit.

The young orphan is adopted by the Flying Tigers, and is called "Little Butch" Dooley. Big Butch and the other Tigers realize that the boy needs a proper education and send him to the Temple Missionary School run by "Doc" Temple.

Little Butch organizes the other refugee children and trains them in fighting the invading Japanese. Leading the children, dubbed "Little Devils," in nightly raids, Little Dutch takes over a store of gasoline, but he is wounded during the battle. Two of the Little Devils are taken prisoner while blowing up a Japanese supply base. When Doc pleads with a Japanese officer for their release, he learns about the attack on Pearl Harbor and realizes he will be taken prisoner. Little Butch rescues Doc, and soon after, the Japanese bomb the mission.

Later, an American aircraft crashes, and the Little Devils race with the Japanese to reach the wreck. The Little Devils find the aircraft first and are surprised to discover that the pilot is Big Butch. After treating Big Butch's wounds, the Little Devils help him cross a river and return safely to the Chinese lines. As the young boys are escaping, however, a Japanese patrol converges on them. They sacrifice their lives while shooting it out with the enemy, and sometime later, the spirit of Little Butch rides with Big Butch, as he drops bombs on Tokyo.

== Cast ==
- Harry Carey as "Doc" Temple
- Paul Kelly as "Big Butch" Dooley
- "Ducky" Louie as Little Butch Dooley
- Gloria Ann Chew as Betty Lou
- Hayward Soo Hoo as Little Joe Doakes
- Jimmie Dodd as Eddie (as Jimmy Dodd)
- Ralph Lewis as Harry
- Philip Ahn as Farmer
- Richard Loo as Colonel Huraji
- Wing Foo as Captain Subi
- Jean Wong as Nurse
- Fred Mah as Patrick
- Nancy Hsueh as Baby
- Oie Chan as Farmer's wife
- Aen-Ling Chow as Daughter

== Production ==
Monogram Pictures had a history of B movie productions and China's Little Devils fits that scenario. The film utilized sequences from Flying Tigers (1942) as well, as the Curtiss P-40 mockups used in the earlier film.

Principal photography on China's Little Devils took place from June 30 until early August, 1944. Most of the filming took place on studio backlots.

== Reception ==
Film historian Leonard Maltin described China's Little Devils as a "Patriotic WW2 yarn involving Chinese waifs who battle Japanese invaders and come to the aid of downed American pilots."
