= Sondra Lee =

American actress and dancer (1928–2026)

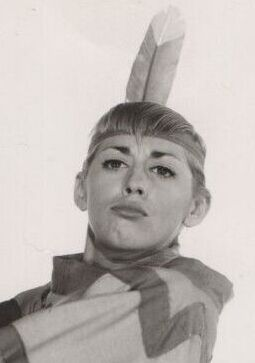
- Lee in a publicity photo for Peter Pan (1954)
- Born: Sondra Lee Gash; September 30, 1928; Newark, New Jersey, U.S.
- Died: February 23, 2026 (aged 97); New York City, U.S.
- Education: Studio 61
- Occupations: Actress; dancer; teacher
- Years active: 1945–2025
- Height: 4 ft 10 in (147 cm)
- Spouse: Sidney Armus (m. 1953, divorced)

Sondra Lee Gash (September 30, 1928 – February 23, 2026) was an American actress, teacher and dancer who performed on Broadway. She was known for her theatrical musical appearances, most notably appearing in the original productions of Peter Pan (1954) and Hello, Dolly! (1964). Aside from acting, she also taught acting courses at New York University and at the Stella Adler Conservatory.

== Early life ==
The daughter of David and Belle (Rosenfeld) Gash, Lee was born in Newark, New Jersey, on September 30, 1928, (Note: According to her obituary from The Hollywood Reporter and Playbill, Lee was 97 years old when she died, with The Hollywood Reporter stating that Lee was born in 1928 with the acknowledgement that some internet databases listed her year of birth as 1930.) and grew up there. As a child, she received growth hormone shots and frequently had pneumonia.

She desired to be an actress from childhood, tracing those yearnings to watching Greta Garbo in the film Camille (1936). Although her mother wanted her to pursue training for a career in business, Lee persisted in her desires. She also began taking dancing lessons in her mid-teens, studying at Studio 61 at Carnegie Hall.

== Career ==
=== Stage ===
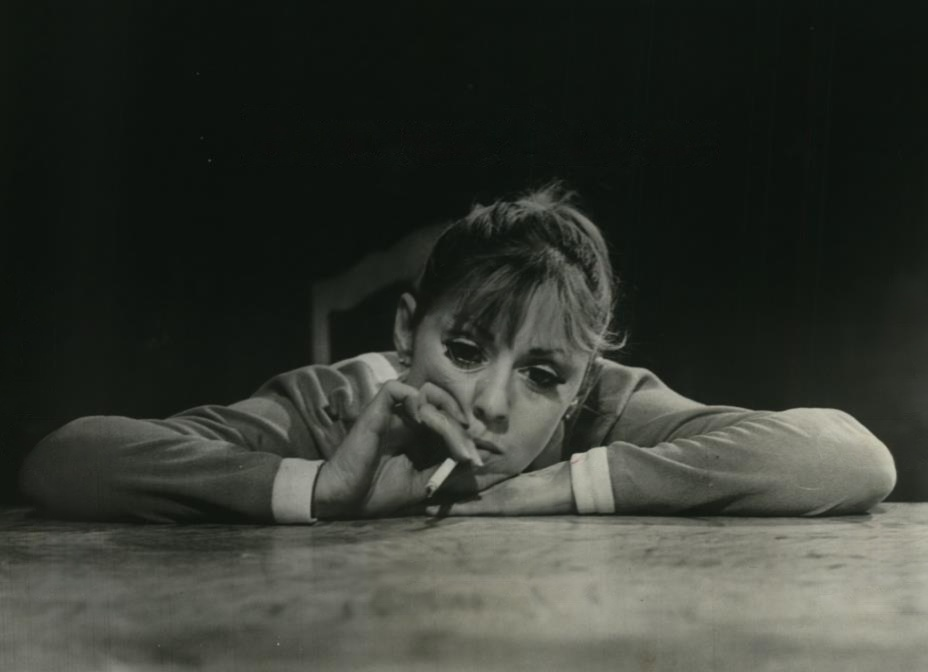
Lee in 1967

Lee's early experience in theater included acting with the YMHA Players in Newark and performing at the Walnut House on the Hill in the Catskills. At age 16, she danced professionally in a nightclub in Washington, D.C.

She began performing on Broadway in 1947 in High Button Shoes. Other Broadway credits included Peter Pan (1954), Hotel Paradiso (1957), Jerome Robbins' Ballet: U.S.A. (1958), Sunday in New York (1961), and Hello Dolly (1964). She also performed in Peter Pan in San Francisco in 1954. In 1953, Lee portrayed Daisy, a maid, in a production of Bloomer Girl by the St. Louis Municipal Opera Theatre, and in 1954, she relocated to France to be the co-star of Ballets de Paris.

She directed Hillbilly Women at the ArcLight Theater in 2011. Based on Kathy Kahn's book of the same name, the production focused on six women of Appalachia, each of whom presented highlights of her life story. Lee taught at the New York University Drama School and at the Stella Adler Conservatory.

For one month in 1965, she worked with members of a newly created touring division of the Metropolitan Opera to ensure that their death scenes evoked an appropriate response from the audience.

After a few decades on hiatus, Lee made her final appearance at Carnegie Hall in 2025 as part of the Transport Group's concert performance of Hello, Dolly!

=== Television ===
Lee was a member of the casts of three DuMont Television Network programs. The S.S. Holiday (1950) was a two-hour variety program that was converted to a one-hour program and retitled Starlit Time, featuring performances at nightclubs in New York City. Once Upon a Tune (1951) was a musical anthology series that presented a complete musical (usually adapted from a Broadway show) in each episode. She also developed choreography for The Voice of Firestone and adapted children's stories that she wrote into dances for television.

She performed in NBC productions of Hansel and Gretel (1958) and Peter Pan (1960).

== Personal life and death ==
Lee married Sidney Armus on October 16, 1953. They had no children. The marriage ended in divorce. He died in 2002.

She made a hobby of using items that she described as mostly "just junk" to decorate her apartment in New York City. Some items were gifts, including a Victorian sofa that someone anonymously left at her door and she reupholstered and an old clock that her parents gave her and she gilded. In other instances, she used her acting skills to obtain used items from shop owners at the lowest possible price.

Lee's memoir, titled I've Slept With Everybody, was published in September 2009.

Lee died at her New York City apartment on February 23, 2026, at the age of 97.

== Selected stage works ==
Year	Title	Role(s)	Notes	Ref.
1947	High Button Shoes	Corps de ballet; playmate of the boy at the picnic	Broadway debut	
1954	Peter Pan	Tiger Lily		
1957	Hotel Paradiso	Victoire, the maid		
1961	Sunday in New York	Woman		
1964	Hello, Dolly!	Minnie Fay		
2005	The Audience	Maddy		
