= Targets =

1968 film by Peter Bogdanovich

- Theatrical release poster
- Directed by: Peter Bogdanovich
- Screenplay by: Peter Bogdanovich (Note: Although Samuel Fuller greatly assisted Bogdanovich in writing the screenplay, he insisted on not receiving a credit for his work.)
- Story by: Polly Platt; Peter Bogdanovich
- Produced by: Peter Bogdanovich
- Starring: Boris Karloff; Tim O'Kelly; Nancy Hsueh; James Brown; Sandy Baron
- Cinematography: László Kovács
- Edited by: Peter Bogdanovich
- Production company: Saticoy Productions
- Distributed by: Paramount Pictures
- Release date: August 13, 1968
- Running time: 90 minutes
- Country: United States
- Language: English
- Budget: $130,000 (estimated)
- Box office: $62,800 (United States)

Targets is a 1968 American crime thriller film directed by Peter Bogdanovich in his theatrical directorial debut, and starring Tim O'Kelly, Boris Karloff, Nancy Hsueh, Bogdanovich, James Brown, Arthur Peterson and Sandy Baron. The film depicts two parallel narratives which converge during the climax: one follows Bobby Thompson, a seemingly ordinary and wholesome young man who embarks on an unprovoked killing spree; the other depicts Byron Orlok, an iconic horror film actor who, disillusioned by real-life violence, is contemplating retirement.

Produced by Roger Corman and written by Polly Platt and Bogdanovich, the film was loosely based on the case of Charles Whitman, a mass shooter who committed the Tower shooting at the University of Texas in 1966. The film was shot in late 1967 in the Los Angeles area.

Released by Paramount Pictures shortly after the assassinations of Martin Luther King Jr. and Robert F. Kennedy, it was considered a box-office bomb. Despite initial commercial failure, the film was well received by critics, and was included in the 2003 book 1001 Movies You Must See Before You Die.

== Plot ==
Byron Orlok, an aged, embittered horror movie actor, abruptly announces his decision to retire from Hollywood and return to his native England to live out his final days. Orlok considers himself outdated because he believes that people are no longer frightened by old-fashioned horror, citing real-life news stories as more horrifying than anything in his films. However, after much persuasion, particularly from young director Sammy Michaels, Orlok agrees to make a final in-person promotional appearance at a Reseda drive-in theater before leaving Hollywood for good.

Bobby Thompson is a young, quiet, clean-cut insurance agent who lives in the suburban San Fernando Valley area with his wife and his parents. Thompson is also deeply disturbed and an obsessive gun collector, but his family takes little notice. One morning, after his father leaves for work, Thompson murders his wife, his mother, and a grocery delivery boy at his home. That afternoon, Thompson continues the killing spree, shooting people in passing cars from atop an oil storage tank that sits alongside a busy freeway. When an employee investigates the gunshots, Thompson shoots him as well. Leaving some of his guns and ammunition at the crime scene, Thompson flees to the same drive-in theater where Orlok is set to appear that evening.

After sunset, Thompson perches himself on the framing inside the screen tower. While the Orlok film is shown (Roger Corman's 1963 The Terror, starring Karloff), Thompson kills the theater's projectionist and shoots at the patrons throughout the parking lot via a hole in the screen. After Thompson wounds Orlok's secretary, Jenny, Orlok confronts Thompson, who is disoriented by Orlok's simultaneous appearance before him and on the large movie screen behind him, allowing the actor to disarm Thompson using his walking cane. Looking at the defeated Thompson, a visibly shaken Orlok remarks, "Is that what I was afraid of?" Moments later, police officers arrive to arrest Thompson for the murders he has committed; as they lead him away, Thompson states with apparent satisfaction that he "hardly ever missed".

== Cast ==
- Tim O'Kelly as Bobby Thompson
- Boris Karloff as Byron Orlok
- Nancy Hsueh as Jenny
- Peter Bogdanovich as Sammy Michaels
- Arthur Peterson as Ed Loughlin
- James Brown as Robert Thompson Sr.
- Tanya Morgan as Ilene Thompson
- Mary Jackson as Charlotte Thompson
- Sandy Baron as Kip "The Hip" Larkin
- Monte Landis as Marshall Smith
- Paul Condylis as Drive-In Manager
- Stafford Morgan as First Gun Shop Salesman
- Mark Dennis as Second Gun Shop Salesman
- Jay Daniel as Snack Bar Attendant
- Gary Kent as Gas Tank Worker
- Frank Marshall as Ticket Boy
- Mike Farrell as Man in Phonebooth
- Warren White as Grocery Boy

== Production ==
=== Development ===
The character and actions of Bobby Thompson are patterned after Charles Whitman, who committed the University of Texas tower shooting in 1966. The character of Byron Orlok, named after Max Schreck's vampire Count Orlok in 1922's Nosferatu, was based on Karloff, with a fictional component of being embittered with the movie business and wanting to retire. The role was Karloff's last appearance in a major American film. Karloff gives a celebrated 100-second single-take performance of W. Somerset Maugham's retelling of the Babylonian fable Appointment in Samarra. In the film's finale at a drive-in theater, Orlok—the old-fashioned, traditional screen monster who always obeyed the rules—confronts the new, realistic, nihilistic late-1960s "monster" in the shape of a clean-cut, unassuming multiple murderer.

Bogdanovich got the chance to make Targets because Boris Karloff owed studio head Roger Corman two days' work. Corman told Bogdanovich he could make any film he liked provided he used Karloff and stayed under budget. Bogdanovich used clips from Corman's Napoleonic-era thriller The Terror in the movie. The clips from The Terror feature Jack Nicholson, Dick Miller and Boris Karloff. A brief clip of Howard Hawks' 1931 film The Criminal Code featuring Karloff was also used. Polly Platt was the film's production designer, in addition to developing the story, and it was her idea to set the ending at a drive-in movie theater.

Interviewed in 2003, Bogdanovich explained that filming on or near the freeway was not permitted, so the freeway shooting spree was filmed guerilla-style in a two-day period. To save money, the whole sequence was filmed without sound, and editor Verna Fields added the effects afterwards. Bogdanovich has said that Samuel Fuller provided generous help on the screenplay and refused to accept either a fee or a screen credit, so Bogdanovich named his own character Sammy Michaels (Fuller's middle name was Michael) in tribute. Fuller advised Bogdanovich to save as much money in the film's budget as possible for the film to have an action-packed conclusion.

=== Casting ===
Bogdanovich cast Tim O'Kelly as the lead role of murderer Bobby Thompson, who impressed him during an audition for the film. Nancy Hsueh was cast by Bogdanovich after he met the actress while she was appearing in John Ford's Cheyenne Autumn (1964).

=== Filming ===
Targets was filmed in Los Angeles, with principal photography beginning November 27, 1967, and concluding December 15, 1967. Interior sequences were shot on makeshift sound stages in a lumberyard building on Santa Monica Boulevard.

== Release ==
Targets premiered in New York City on August 13, 1968. It later screened at the Edinburgh Film Festival in September of that year. American International Pictures offered to release, but Bogdanovich wanted to try to see if the film could get a deal with a major studio. It was seen by Robert Evans of Paramount Pictures, who bought it for $150,000, giving Corman an instant profit on the movie before it was released.

Although the film was written and production photography completed in late 1967, it was not released until after the Assassination of Martin Luther King Jr. and that of Robert F. Kennedy in the summer of 1968, thus having topical relevance.

Around five years after release, in March 1973, New Zealand refused to issue a 'certificate of approval' for the film's trailer on the basis that it was "contrary to public order and decency".

=== Box office ===
The film only received a minimal release due to the recent assassinations. Variety only tracked the film for 7 playing weeks in key United States cities in 1968, with a gross of $60,800.

=== Critical response ===
On the review aggregator website Rotten Tomatoes, Targets has an approval rating of 91% based on 33 reviews, with an average rating of 7.8/10. The website's critical consensus reads: "A startling directorial debut by Peter Bogdanovich mixes an homage to Boris Karloff horror films with a timely sniper story to create a thriller with modern baggage and old school shock and awe."

Howard Thompson of The New York Times called the film an "original and brilliant melodrama", and concluded that "Targets scores an unnerving bullseye." Dave Kehr of The Chicago Reader called the film "an interesting response to the demands of low-budget genre film making." Variety wrote of the film: "Aware of the virtue of implied violence, Bogdanovich conveys moments of shock, terror, suspense and fear." In a retrospective review of the film, Geoff Andrew of Time Out called it "a fascinatingly complex commentary on American mythology, exploring the relationship between the inner world of the imagination and the outer world of violence and paranoia, both of which were relevant to contemporary American traumas."

Writing for the Chicago Sun-Times, critic Roger Ebert gave the film two-and-a-half stars out of four, and wrote that "Targets isn't a very good film, but it is an interesting one." He called Karloff's performance "fascinating" but noted that the film could have been "more direct and effective" without his scenes. A review of the film published by Time stated that "Targets eventually falls victim to artistic overkill."

Stanley Kauffmann of The New Republic wrote, "Targets showed considerable skill, but was trapped in Movieland, in more than subject matter". John Simon wrote- "Targets handled a valid subject but in a trashy way."

Bogdanovich, who appears in the film as a young writer-director, credits it with getting him noticed by the studios, which in turn led to his directing three very successful studio films (The Last Picture Show, What's Up, Doc?, and Paper Moon) in the early 1970s.

In 2018, on the film's 50th anniversary, Mark Lager wrote on Cinema Retro that "Bogdanovich had been deeply disturbed by Charles Whitman's mass shooting and felt compelled to write a screenplay based on the event. Targets was released in August 1968 and was especially relevant that year in the wake of the assassinations of Martin Luther King Jr. and Robert Kennedy".

In 2020, Quentin Tarantino called Targets "the most political movie Corman ever made since The Intruder. "And forty years later it's still one of the strongest cries for gun control in American cinema. The film isn't a thriller with a social commentary buried inside of it (the normal Corman model), it's a social commentary with a thriller buried inside of it... It was one of the most powerful films of 1968 and one of the greatest directorial debuts of all time. And I believe the best film ever produced by Roger Corman."

=== Home media ===
Paramount Home Entertainment released Targets on DVD on August 12, 2003.

In 2023, Targets was remastered in 4K and released on DVD and Blu-ray by The Criterion Collection. BFI released Targets on 25 September 2023 for the first time on Blu-ray in the UK.

== See also ==
- List of American films of 1968
- List of cult films
- 1965 Highway 101 sniper attack
- University of Texas tower shooting
- Interstate 75 Kentucky shooting

== Sources ==
- Corman, Roger; Jerome, Jim (1990). How I Made a Hundred Movies in Hollywood and Never Lost a Dime. New York City, New York: Random House. ISBN 978-0-394-56974-1.
- Jacobs, Stephen (2011). Boris Karloff: More Than a Monster. Sheffield, England: Tomahawk Press. ISBN 978-0-955-76704-3.
- Kauffmann, Stanley (1974). Living Images Film Comment and Criticism. New York City, New York: Harper & Row Publishers. ISBN 978-0-060-12268-3.
- Nollen, Scott Allen; Nollen, Yuyun Yuningsih (2021). Karloff and the East: Asian, Indian, Middle Eastern and Oceanian Characters and Subjects in His Screen Career. Jefferson, North Carolina: McFarland. ISBN 978-1-476-68063-7.
- Simon, John (1982). Reverse Angle A Decade of American films. New York City, New York: Crown Publishers. ISBN 978-0-517-54697-0.
- Yule, Andrew (1992). Picture Shows: The Life and Films of Peter Bogdanovich. New York City, New York: Limelight. ISBN 978-0-879-10153-4.
