= Nancy Hsueh =

American actress

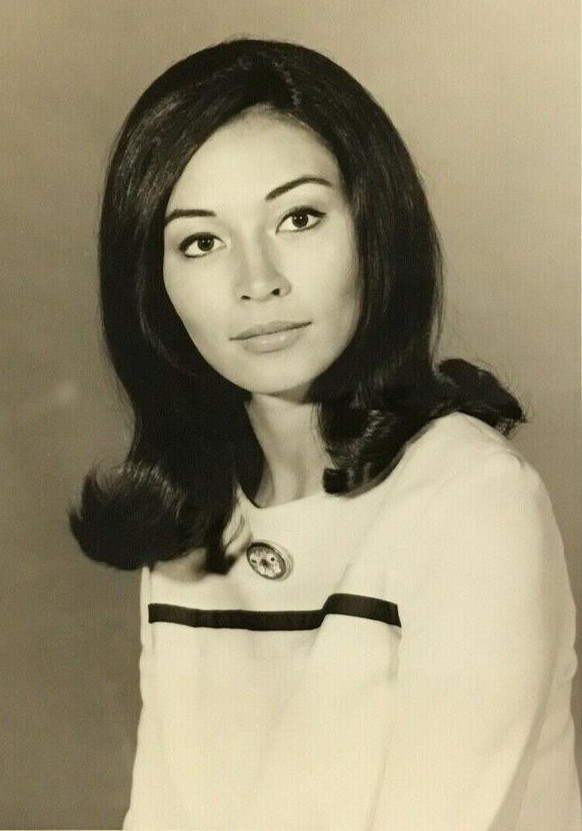
- Hsueh in 1967
- Born: February 25, 1941; Los Angeles, California, U.S.
- Died: November 24, 1980 (aged 39); Portland, Maine, U.S.
- Occupation: Actress
- Years active: 1945–1978
- Notable work: Love is a Many Splendored Thing; Targets
- Spouse: Daniel Carr

Nancy Hsueh (Note: Hsueh's preferred pronunciation of her surname was /ʃeɪ/, SHAY.) (February 25, 1941 – November 24, 1980) (Note: A few sources state she lived from 1939–1991, but those dates are contradicted by vital records.) was an American actress. She was one of the first Asian American actresses to have a leading role in a U.S. television series, Love is a Many Splendored Thing (1967), regarded as the first American soap opera to portray an interracial relationship between an Asian woman and a white man. She also appeared in films such as War Hunt (1962), Cheyenne Autumn (1964), and Targets (1968).

== Career ==
Born in Los Angeles, California, Hsueh made two films as a child actress, China's Little Devils (1945) and Intrigue (1947), on which her father served as a technical adviser.

In the early 1960s, she appeared in the Korean War drama War Hunt (1962) and the John Ford Western Cheyenne Autumn (1964). According to author Jon Abbott, "her exotic appearance kept her busy in the spy shows of the period, including The Man from U.N.C.L.E., I Spy, and The Wild, Wild West."

In 1967, she was cast as the female lead in the CBS soap opera Love is a Many Splendored Thing. The series was initially intended as a continuation of the 1955 film of the same name, which told the story of an interracial relationship between an American reporter and a Eurasian doctor. Hsueh portrayed Mia Elliott, the daughter of the couple in the original film. However, CBS censors became uncomfortable with the series' portrayal of an interracial romance between a Eurasian woman (Hsueh) and a white American doctor (Robert Milli), and Hsueh's character was written out of the series within one year.

Her most prominent film role was as Boris Karloff's personal assistant in Peter Bogdanovich's Targets (1968). She had only a few small parts in film and television in the 1970s; her final acting role was in House Calls (1978).

== Personal life and death ==
Hsueh was the daughter of Wei Fan Hsueh, who was born in Nanking, China, and Evelyn Postal, who was of Native American and Scots-Irish descent. She majored in education at the University of California, Los Angeles.

On January 16, 1965, she married Daniel Carr, whom she had met during filming of Cheyenne Autumn.

She died of atherosclerosis in Portland, Maine on November 24, 1980, aged 39.

== Filmography ==
- China's Little Devils (1945) as Baby
- Intrigue (1947) as Mia, orphan girl
- Flower Drum Song (1961) as Girl (uncredited)
- War Hunt (1962) as Mama San
- Cheyenne Autumn (1964) as Little Bird (uncredited)
- Lt. Robin Crusoe, U.S.N. (1966) as Native Girl
- Doctor, You've Got to Be Kidding! (1967) as Joan Mavis (uncredited)
- Targets (1968) as Jenny
- House Calls (1978) as Gretchen
