= Tim O'Kelly =

American actor

- O'Kelly in Targets (1968)
- Born: Timothy Patrick Wright; March 12, 1941; Los Angeles, California, U.S.
- Died: January 4, 1990 (aged 48); Los Angeles, California, U.S.
- Occupation: Actor
- Years active: 1965–1970

Tim O'Kelly (variously O'Kelley; born Timothy Patrick Wright, March 12, 1941 – January 4, 1990) was an American actor best known for playing the sniper in Peter Bogdanovich's film Targets (1968).

== Career ==
O'Kelly first gained attention as a stage actor with the Santa Monica Group Theater. He later served as a director and acting coach with the group. Among the stage productions he appeared in was Peter Shaffer's The Private Ear/The Public Eye. Much of his television work was in Western series such as The Monroes, Cimarron Strip, The Big Valley, and The Guns of Will Sonnett, although he also made appearances in Batman. O'Kelly also played Detective Danny "Danno" Williams in the pilot episode of Hawaii Five-O, but was replaced by James MacArthur after a preview audience found O'Kelly "too young" for the part.

His one major film appearance was opposite Boris Karloff in Peter Bogdanovich's directorial debut Targets (1968), in which he played the spree killer Bobby Thompson, a character loosely based on Texas tower sniper Charles Whitman. His final confirmed acting role was the 1970 film The Grasshopper (as the boyfriend of Jacqueline Bisset's character), after which he faded from the public eye.

== Personal life ==
O'Kelly was the son of Maurice Wayne Wright and Billie Jo Chew. He had a brief marriage to actress Evelyn Rudie, whom he married in 1968. Vital records indicate he died of cardiomyopathy in Los Angeles on January 4, 1990, aged 48.

== Partial filmography ==
- For Pete's Sake (1966)
- The Big Valley (1966) – Will Marvin
- Gunsmoke (1966) – Sandy
- Cimarron Strip (1967) – Episode 3: Broken Wing – Jing McQueen
- Targets (1968) – Bobby Thompson
- Hawaii Five-O (1968) – Danny
- The Grasshopper (1970) – Eddie Molina
