= Robert Redford =

American actor and director (1936–2025)

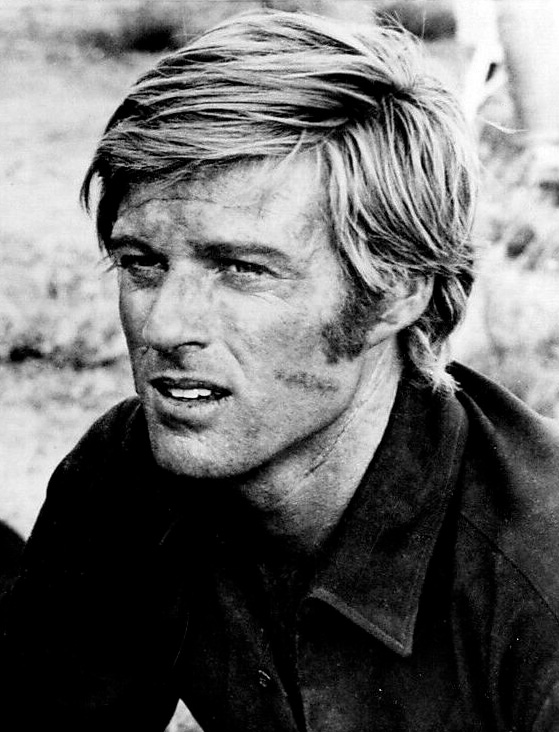
- Redford in 1971
- Born: Charles Robert Redford Jr. August 18, 1936; Santa Monica, California, U.S.
- Died: September 16, 2025 (aged 89); Sundance, Utah, U.S.
- Burial place: Robert Redford Home, Sundance
- Occupations: Actor; film director; producer
- Years active: 1958–2025
- Works: Full list
- Spouses: Lola Van Wagenen (m. 1958; div. 1985) Sibylle Szaggars (m. 2009)
- Children: 4, including James and Amy
- Awards: Full list

Signature
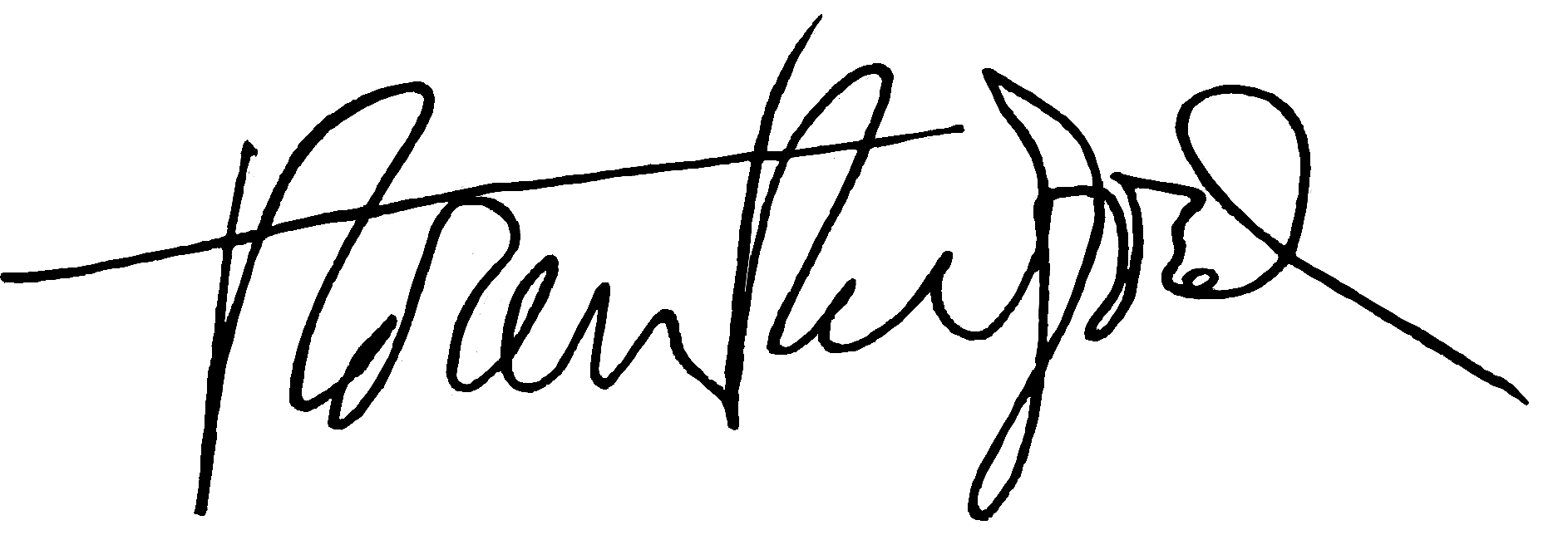

Charles Robert Redford Jr. (August 18, 1936 – September 16, 2025) was an American actor, director, and producer, celebrated for his magnetic presence as a leading man during the American New Wave. Across a career spanning more than six decades, Redford earned widespread recognition and numerous awards, including an Academy Award, a BAFTA Award and five Golden Globe Awards, including a Cecil B. DeMille Award in 1994. He also earned various other honors, including the Screen Actors Guild Life Achievement Award in 1996, the Academy Honorary Award in 2002, the Kennedy Center Honors in 2005, the Presidential Medal of Freedom in 2016, and the Honorary César in 2019.

Redford began his career on television in the late 1950s, appearing in anthology series such as Alfred Hitchcock Presents and The Twilight Zone. He made his Broadway debut in Neil Simon's comedy Barefoot in the Park (1963) before taking film roles in War Hunt (1962) and Inside Daisy Clover (1965). Redford achieved Hollywood stardom with Barefoot in the Park (1967), Butch Cassidy and the Sundance Kid (1969), Downhill Racer (1969), Jeremiah Johnson (1972), The Candidate (1972), and The Sting (1973), with the last earning him a nomination for the Academy Award for Best Actor.

Redford’s stardom continued with films such as The Way We Were (1973), The Great Gatsby (1974), Three Days of the Condor (1975), The Great Waldo Pepper (1975), All the President's Men (1976), The Electric Horseman (1979), The Natural (1984) and Out of Africa (1985). Later credits include Sneakers (1992), Indecent Proposal (1993), An Unfinished Life (2005), All Is Lost (2013), Truth (2015), Our Souls at Night (2017) and The Old Man & the Gun (2018). He also played Alexander Pierce in the MCU films Captain America: The Winter Soldier (2014) and Avengers: Endgame (2019), the latter serving as his final film role.

Redford made his directorial debut with the family drama Ordinary People (1980), which won four Academy Awards including Best Picture and Best Director. His later directing credits include The Milagro Beanfield War (1988), A River Runs Through It (1992), Quiz Show (1994), The Horse Whisperer (1998) and The Legend of Bagger Vance (2000). A major advocate for independent cinema, Redford co-founded the Sundance Institute and the Sundance Film Festival in 1978, helping to foster a new generation of filmmakers. Beyond his artistic career, Redford was noted for his environmental activism, his support of Native American and Indigenous rights, and his advocacy for LGBTQ equality.

== Early life and education ==
Charles Robert Redford Jr. was born on August 18, 1936, in Santa Monica, California, to Martha Woodruff Redford (née Hart; 1914–1955), who was from Austin, Texas, and Charles Robert Redford Sr. (1914–1991), an accountant. He had a paternal half-brother, William. Redford was of Irish, Scottish and English ancestry. His patrilineal great-great-grandfather, a Protestant Englishman named Elisha Redford, married Mary Ann McCreery, of Irish Catholic descent, in Manchester, Lancashire. They emigrated to New York City in 1849, immediately settling next in Stonington, Connecticut. They had a son named Charles, the first in line to have been given the name. Regarding Redford's maternal lineage, the Harts were Irish from Galway and the Greens were Scotch-Irish who settled in the United States in the 18th century. Redford's family lived in Van Nuys while his father worked in El Segundo. As a child, he and his family often traveled to Austin to visit his maternal grandfather. Redford credited his environmentalism and love of nature to his childhood in Texas.

Redford attended Van Nuys High School where he was classmates with the future professional baseball pitcher Don Drysdale. He described himself as having been a "bad" student, finding inspiration outside the classroom in art and sports. He hit tennis balls with Pancho Gonzalez at the Los Angeles Tennis Club to help Gonzalez warm up for matches. Redford had a mild case of polio when he was 11.

After graduating from high school in 1954, Redford attended the University of Colorado in Boulder for a year and a half, where he was a member of Kappa Sigma fraternity. While there, he worked as a janitor at a restaurant and bar called The Sink, where a painting of his likeness now figures prominently among its murals. While at Colorado, Redford began drinking heavily and as a result lost his half-scholarship and was expelled from school. He went on to travel in Europe, living in France, Spain and Italy. He later studied painting at Pratt Institute in Brooklyn, New York and took classes at the American Academy of Dramatic Arts (Class of 1959) in Manhattan, New York.

== Career ==
=== 1959–1966: Early roles ===
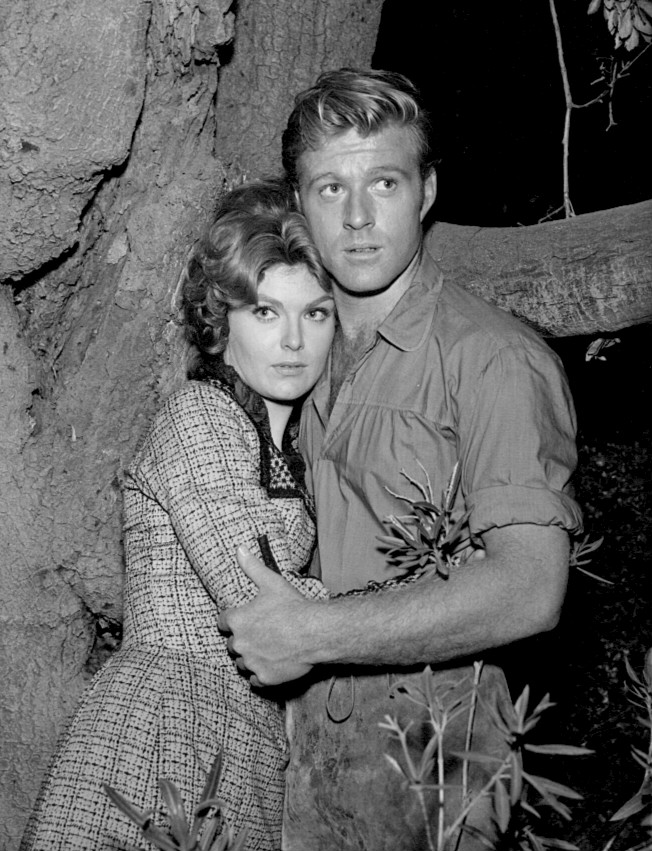
Redford and Patricia Blair in The Virginian (1964)

Redford's acting career began in New York City, where he worked both on stage and in television. His Broadway debut was in a small role in Tall Story (1959), followed by parts in The Highest Tree (1959) and Sunday in New York (1961). His biggest success on Broadway was as the stuffy newlywed husband of Elizabeth Ashley in the original 1963 cast of Neil Simon's Barefoot in the Park. Starting in 1960, Redford appeared as a guest star on numerous television drama programs, including Naked City, Maverick, The Untouchables, The Americans, Whispering Smith, Perry Mason, Alfred Hitchcock Presents, Route 66, Dr. Kildare, Playhouse 90, Tate, The Twilight Zone, The Virginian and Captain Brassbound's Conversion, among others.

Redford made his screen debut in the film adaptation of Tall Story (1960), reprising his Broadway role, although he was not credited. The film's stars were Anthony Perkins, Jane Fonda and Ray Walston. After his Broadway success, he was cast in larger feature roles in movies. In 1960, Redford was cast as Danny Tilford, a mentally disturbed young man trapped in the wreckage of his family garage, in "Breakdown", one of the last episodes of the syndicated adventure series Rescue 8, starring Jim Davis and Lang Jeffries. Redford earned an Emmy nomination as Best Supporting Actor for his performance in The Voice of Charlie Pont (ABC, 1962). One of his last television appearances until 2019 was on October 7, 1963, on Breaking Point, an ABC medical drama about psychiatry.

In 1962, Redford received his second film role in War Hunt, and was cast soon after alongside screen legend Alec Guinness in the war comedy Situation Hopeless... But Not Serious, in which he played a U.S. soldier falsely imprisoned by a German civilian even after the war had ended. In Inside Daisy Clover (1965), which won him a Golden Globe for best new star, he played a bisexual movie star who marries starlet Natalie Wood and rejoined her along with Charles Bronson for Sydney Pollack's This Property Is Condemned (1966)—again, as her lover, though this time in a film which achieved even greater success. The same year saw his first teaming (on equal footing) with Jane Fonda, in Arthur Penn's The Chase. The film marked the only time Redford starred with Marlon Brando.

=== 1967–1979: Career stardom ===
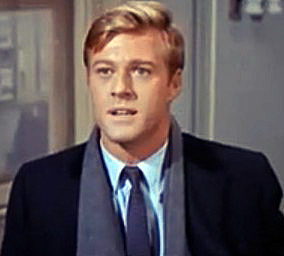
Redford in Barefoot in the Park (1967)

Fonda and Redford were paired again in the popular big-screen version of Barefoot in the Park (1967) and were again co-stars a dozen years later in Pollack's The Electric Horseman (1979), followed 38 years later with a Netflix feature, Our Souls at Night. After this initial success, Redford became concerned about his blond male stereotype image and refused roles in Who's Afraid of Virginia Woolf? and The Graduate. Redford found the niche he was seeking in George Roy Hill's Butch Cassidy and the Sundance Kid (1969), scripted by William Goldman, in which he was paired for the first time with Paul Newman. The film was a huge success and made him a major bankable star, cementing his screen image as an intelligent, reliable, sometimes sardonic good guy.

While Redford did not receive an Academy Award or Golden Globe nomination for playing the Sundance Kid, he won a British Academy of Film and Television Award (BAFTA) for that role and his parts in Downhill Racer (1969) and Tell Them Willie Boy Is Here (1969). The latter two films and the subsequent Little Fauss and Big Halsy (1970) and The Hot Rock (1972) were not commercially successful. Redford had long harbored ambitions to work on both sides of the camera. As early as 1969, Redford had served as the executive producer for Downhill Racer. The political satire The Candidate (1972) was a moderate box-office and critical success.

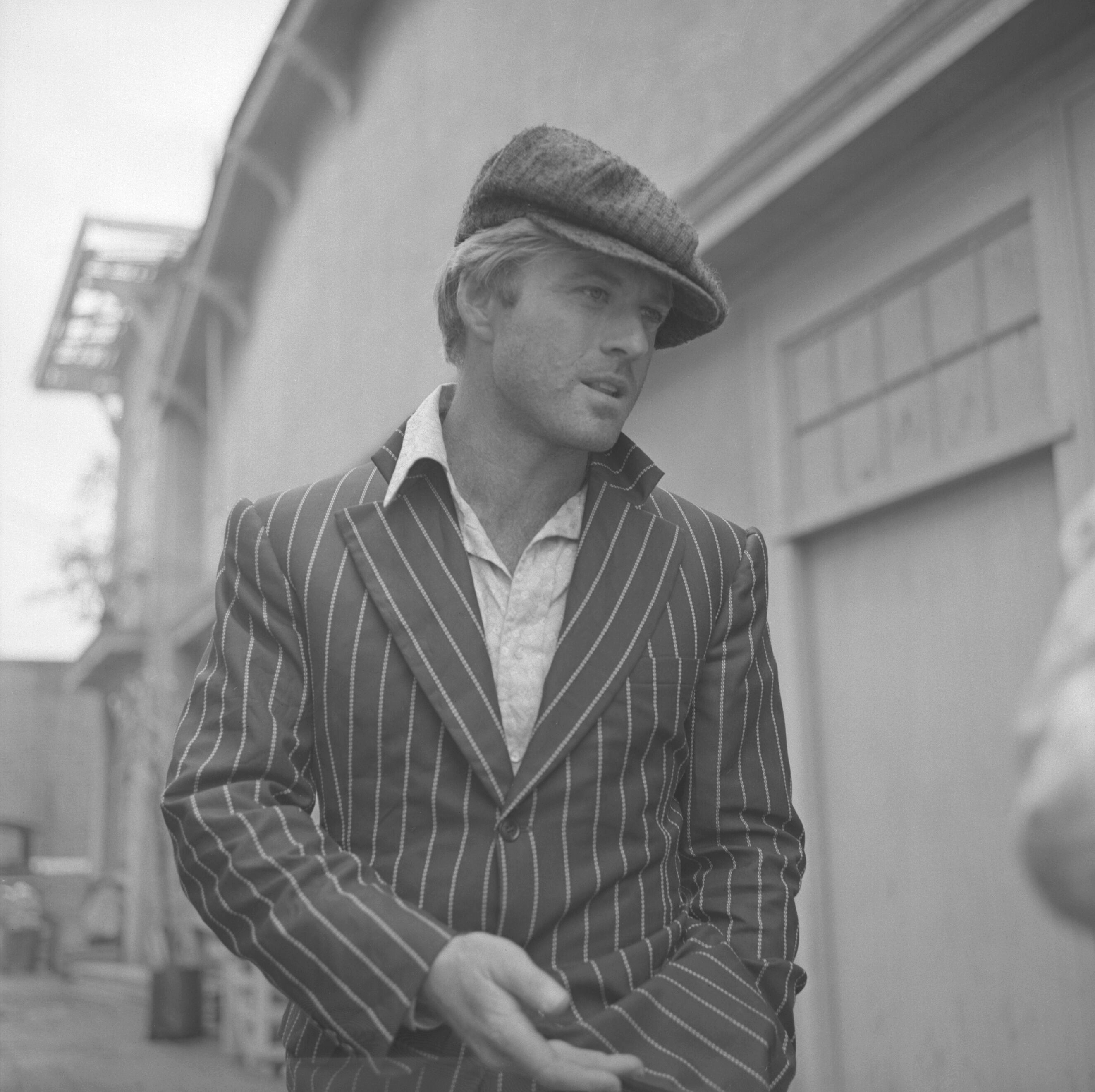
Redford in 1973

Starting in 1973, Redford experienced a four-year run of box-office successes. The western Jeremiah Johnson's (1972) box-office earnings from early 1973 until its second re-release in 1975 would have placed it as the 2nd-highest-grossing film of 1973. His romantic period drama with Barbra Streisand, The Way We Were (1973), was the 5th-highest-grossing film of 1973. The crime caper reunion with Paul Newman, The Sting (1973), became the top-grossing film of 1974 and one of the top-twenty highest-grossing movies of all time when adjusted for inflation and it also landed Redford the lone nomination of his career for the Academy Award for Best Actor. The following year he starred in the romantic drama The Great Gatsby (1974), also starring Mia Farrow, Sam Waterston and Bruce Dern. The film was the 8th-highest-grossing film of 1974. Butch Cassidy and the Sundance Kid (1969) placed as the 10th-highest-grossing film for 1974, as it was re-released due to the popularity of The Sting. In 1974, Redford became the first performer since Bing Crosby in 1946 to have three films in a year's top-ten-grossing titles. Each year between 1974 and 1976, movie exhibitors voted Redford Hollywood's top box-office star.

In 1975, Redford's hit movies included a 1920s aviation drama, The Great Waldo Pepper (1975) and the spy thriller Three Days of the Condor (1975), alongside Faye Dunaway, which finished 16th and 17th in box-office grosses for 1975, respectively. In 1976, he co-starred with Dustin Hoffman in the 2nd-highest-grossing film for the year, the critically acclaimed All the President's Men. In 1976, Redford published The Outlaw Trail: A Journey Through Time. Redford stated, "The Outlaw Trail. It was a name that fascinated me—a geographical anchor in Western folklore. Whether real or imagined, it was a name that, for me, held a kind of magic, a freedom, a mystery. I wanted to see it in much the same way as the outlaws did, by horse and by foot and document the adventure with text and photographs."

All the President's Men, in which Redford and Hoffman play Washington Post reporters Bob Woodward and Carl Bernstein, was a landmark film for Redford. Not only was he the executive producer and co-star, but the film's serious subject matter—the Watergate scandal—and its attempt to create a realistic portrayal of journalism also reflected the actor's offscreen concerns for political causes. The film landed eight Academy Award nominations, including for Best Picture and Best Director (Alan J. Pakula), while winning for the Best Screenplay (Goldman). It won the New York Film Critics Award for Best Picture and Best Director. In 1977, Redford appeared in a segment of the war film A Bridge Too Far (1977). He took a two-year hiatus from movies before starring as a past-his-prime rodeo star in the adventure-romance The Electric Horseman (1979). This film reunited him with Fonda, finishing at No. 9 at the box office in 1980.

=== 1980–1998: Directorial debut ===
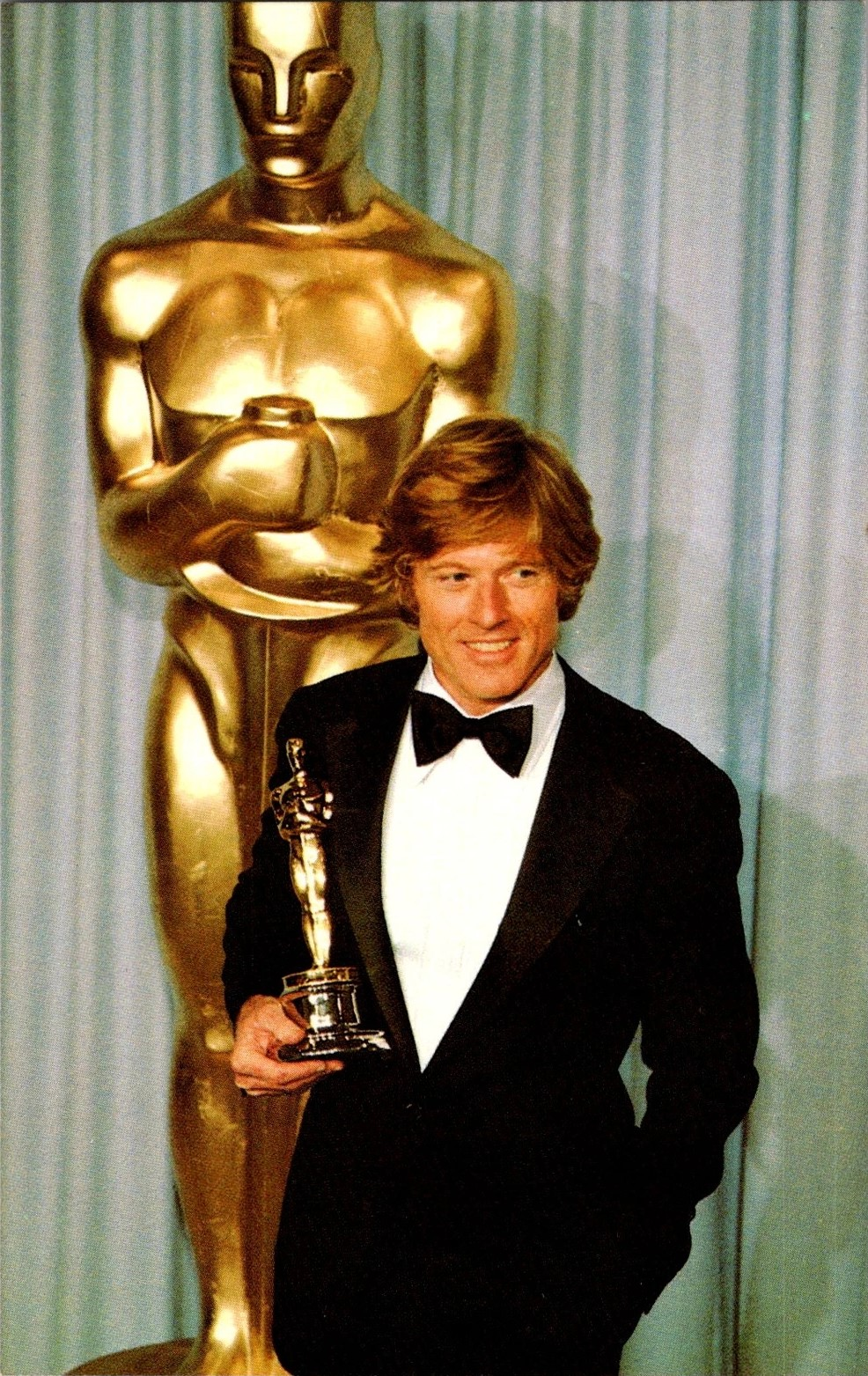
Redford holding an Oscar won at the 53rd Academy Awards in 1981

Redford's first film as director was the drama film Ordinary People (1980), a drama about the slow disintegration of an upper-middle class family after the death of a son. Redford was credited with obtaining a powerful dramatic performance from Mary Tyler Moore, as well as superb work from Donald Sutherland and Timothy Hutton, who also won the Oscar for Best Supporting Actor. The film is one of the most critically and publicly acclaimed films of the decade, winning four Academy Awards, including Best Director for Redford himself and Best Picture. Critic Roger Ebert declared it "an intelligent, perceptive and deeply moving film." Later that year he appeared in the prison drama Brubaker (1980), playing a prison warden attempting to reform the system.

Soon afterwards, Redford starred in the baseball drama The Natural (1984). Sydney Pollack's Out of Africa (1985), with Redford in the male lead role opposite Meryl Streep, became a large box office success (combined 1985 and 1986 grosses placed it at No. 5 for 1986), won a Golden Globe for Best Picture, and won seven Oscars, including Best Picture. Streep was nominated for Best Actress, but Redford did not receive a nomination. The movie proved to be Redford's biggest success of the decade and Redford and Pollack's most successful of their seven movies together. Redford's next film, Legal Eagles (1986) alongside Debra Winger, was only a minor success at the box office.

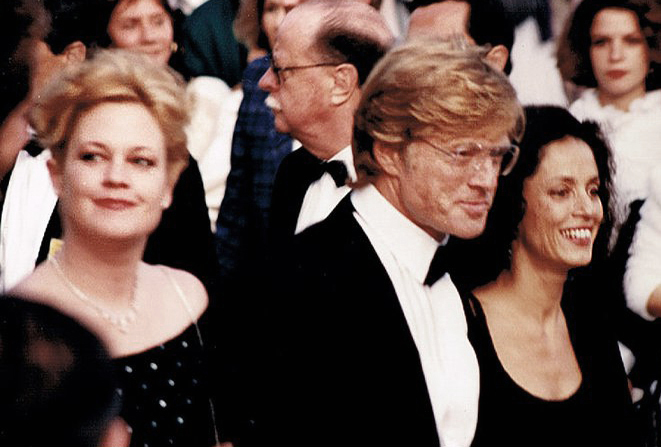
Redford with Melanie Griffith and Sônia Braga, promoting The Milagro Beanfield War at the 1988 Cannes Film Festival

Redford did not direct again until The Milagro Beanfield War (1988), a well-crafted, though not commercially successful, screen version of John Nichols's acclaimed novel of the Southwest. The Milagro Beanfield War is the story of the people of Milagro, New Mexico (based on the real town of Truchas in northern New Mexico), overcoming big developers who set about to ruin their community and force them out with tax increases.

Redford continued as a major star throughout the 1990s and 2000s. In 1992, he released his third film as a director, the period drama A River Runs Through It, based on Norman Maclean's novella, starring Craig Sheffer, Brad Pitt and Tom Skerritt. Redford received a nomination for the Golden Globe Award for Best Director. This was a return to mainstream success for Redford as a director and brought a young Pitt to greater prominence. In 1994, he directed the exposé Quiz Show about the quiz show scandal of the late 1950s. In the latter film, Redford worked from a screenplay by Paul Attanasio with cinematographer Michael Ballhaus and a cast that featured Paul Scofield, John Turturro, Rob Morrow and Ralph Fiennes. David Ansen of Newsweek wrote, "Robert Redford may have become a more complacent movie star in the last decade, but he has become a more daring and accomplished filmmaker. 'Quiz Show' is his best movie since 'Ordinary People'".

In 1993, Redford starred in Indecent Proposal as a billionaire businessman who tests a couple's morals; the film became one of the year's biggest hits. He co-starred with Michelle Pfeiffer in the newsroom romance Up Close & Personal (1996), and with Kristin Scott Thomas and a young Scarlett Johansson in The Horse Whisperer (1998), which he also directed. Redford also continued work in films with political contexts, such as Havana (1990), playing Jack Weil, a professional gambler in 1959 Cuba during the Revolution, as well as Sneakers (1992), in which he co-starred with River Phoenix and Sidney Poitier.

=== 1999–2012: Expansive filmmaking and later works ===
Redford also directed Matt Damon and Will Smith in The Legend of Bagger Vance (2000). He appeared as a disgraced Army general sent to prison in the prison drama The Last Castle (2001), directed by Rod Lurie. In the same year, Redford reteamed with Pitt for Spy Game, another success for the pair but with Redford switching this time from director to actor. During that time, he planned to direct and star in a sequel of The Candidate but the project never happened. Redford, a leading environmental activist, narrated the IMAX documentary Sacred Planet (2004), a sweeping journey across the globe to some of its most exotic and endangered places. In The Clearing (2004), Redford portrayed Wayne Hayes, a shrewd businessman whose kidnapping forces him and his wife to confront the personal compromises behind their seemingly ideal life.

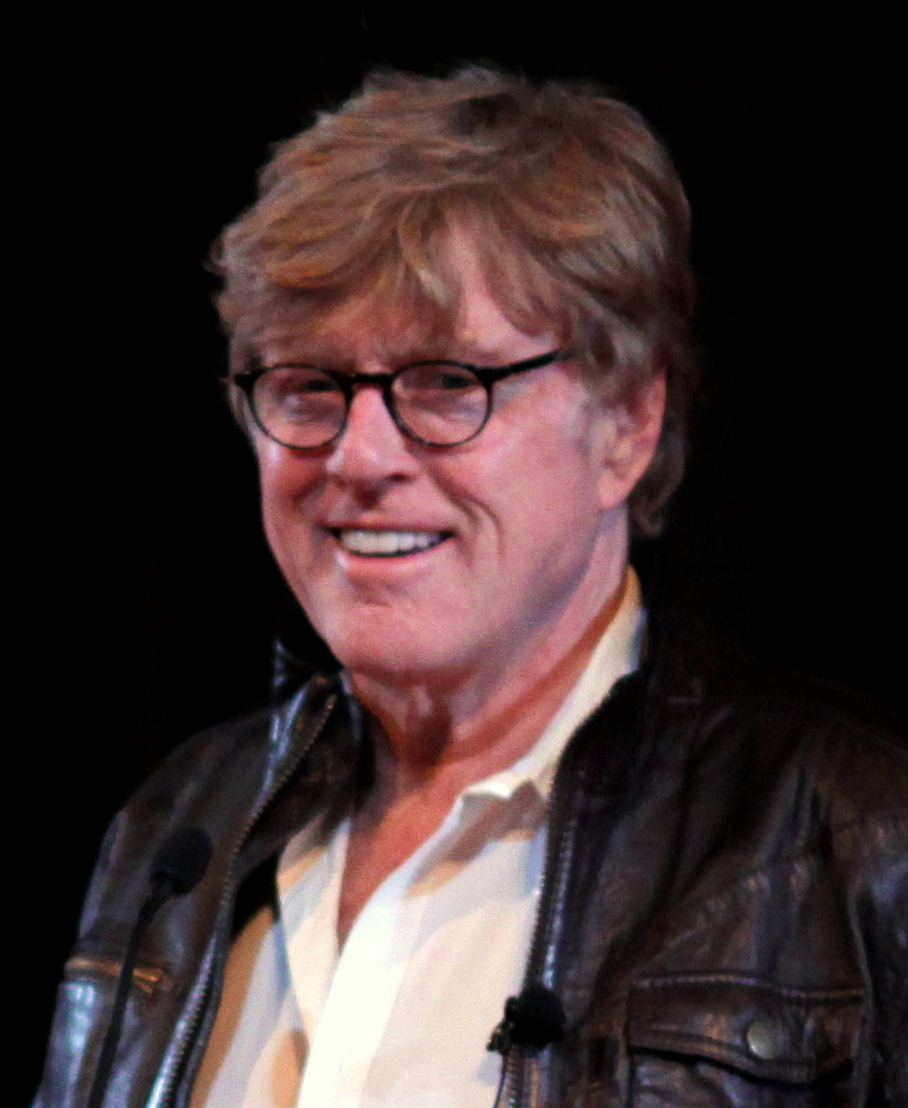
Redford in 2009

Redford stepped back into producing with The Motorcycle Diaries (2004), a coming-of-age road film about Ernesto "Che" Guevara as a young medical student and his friend Alberto Granado. It also explored the political and social issues of South America that influenced Guevara and shaped his future. With five years spent on the film's making, Redford was credited by director Walter Salles for being instrumental in getting it made and released. Back in front of the camera, Redford received good notices for his role in director Lasse Hallström's An Unfinished Life (2005) as a cantankerous rancher who takes in his estranged daughter-in-law (Jennifer Lopez) and the granddaughter he never knew, after they flee an abusive relationship.

Meanwhile, Redford returned to familiar territory when he reteamed with Streep, 22 years after they starred in Out of Africa, for his personal project Lions for Lambs (2007), which also starred Tom Cruise. After a great deal of hype, the film opened to mixed reviews and disappointing box office. Owen Gleiberman of Entertainment Weekly wrote, "Lions for Lambs is so square it's like something out of the gray twilight glow of the golden age of television. Even the military plot, which clunks, seems to be taking place on stage." In 2010, Redford released The Conspirator, a period drama revolving around the assassination of Abraham Lincoln. Redford appeared in the 2011 documentary Buck by Cindy Meehl, where he discussed his experiences with title subject Buck Brannaman during the production of The Horse Whisperer. In 2012, Redford directed The Company You Keep, in which he starred as a former Weather Underground activist who goes on the run after a journalist discovers his identity. The film starred himself, Shia LaBeouf and Julie Christie.

=== 2013–2025: Final roles and retirement ===
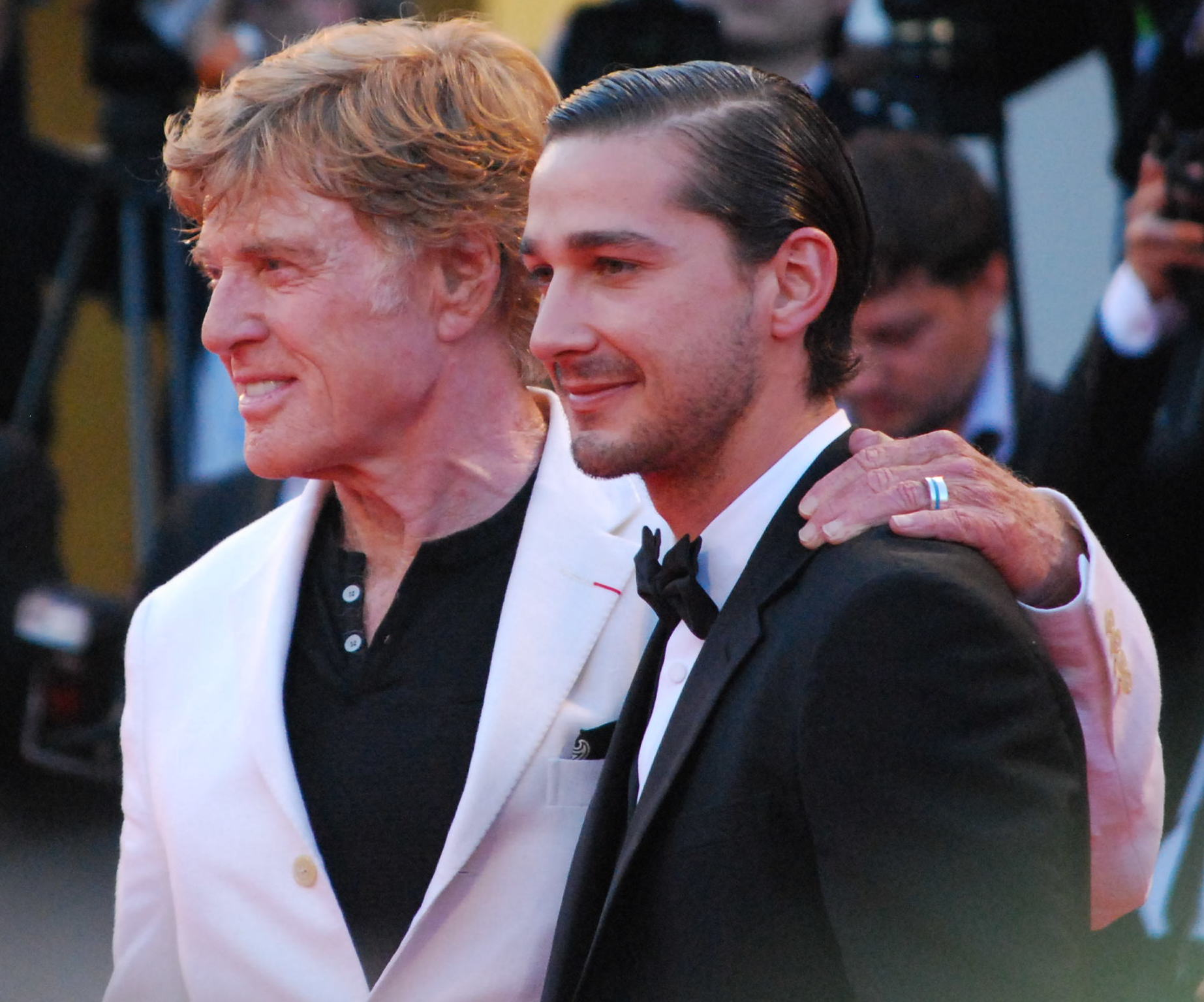
Redford and Shia LaBeouf at the Venice Film Festival in 2012

In 2013, Redford starred in All Is Lost, directed by J.C. Chandor, about a man lost at sea. He received acclaim for his performance in the film, in which he was its only cast member and there is almost no dialogue. Redford was nominated for a Golden Globe Award for Best Actor – Motion Picture Drama and won the New York Film Critics Circle Award for Best Actor, his first time winning an acting honor from that group (he had been nominated in 1969 for Downhill Racer). Ali Arikan wrote in RogerEbert.com, "Chandor plays to Redford's strengths: his battered visage, calm determination and detachment from the vagaries of a "normal" existence. In return, Redford gives the performance of the latter half of his career in a role that is not just physically, but also psychologically demanding".

In the 2014 Marvel Studios superhero film Captain America: The Winter Soldier, Redford played antagonist Alexander Pierce, the head of S.H.I.E.L.D. and secret leader of the Hydra cell operating the Triskelion. Redford was a co-producer and, with Emma Thompson and Nick Nolte, acted in the film A Walk in the Woods (2015), based on Bill Bryson's book of the same name. Redford had optioned the film rights for the book from Bryson after reading it more than a decade earlier, with the intent of co-starring in it with Paul Newman, but had shelved the project after Newman's death.

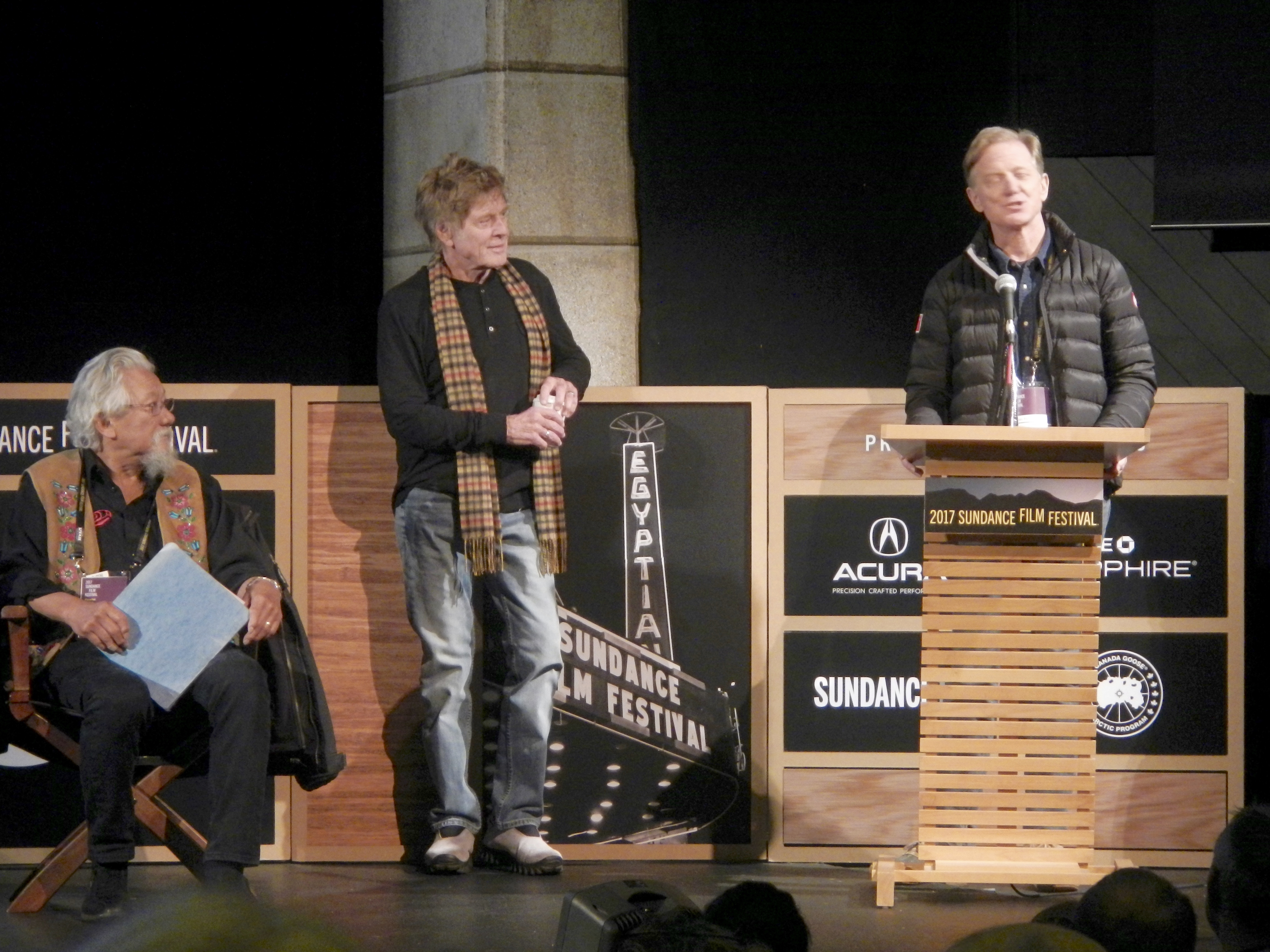
Redford (center) at the Sundance Film Festival in 2017

Also in 2015, he played news anchor Dan Rather in James Vanderbilt's Truth alongside Cate Blanchett. The film received mixed reviews with Justin Chang of Variety noting, "Redford, who bears a solid resemblance to Rather but not quite enough to make you forget whom you're watching, plays the veteran newsman with easy gravitas, inner strength and a gentle paternal twinkle, with little display of the anger and volatility for which he was often known over the course of his storied career." In 2016, he took the supporting role of Mr. Meacham in the Disney remake Pete's Dragon. The next year, Redford starred in The Discovery and Our Souls at Night, both released on Netflix streaming in 2017. The latter film, which he also produced, reunited him with Fonda for the fifth time and garnered positive reviews.

Redford played bank robber Forrest Tucker in the David Lowery–directed drama film The Old Man & the Gun, which was released in September 2018 and for which he received a Golden Globe nomination. Alissa Wikinson wrote in Vox, "In The Old Man & the Gun, both Redford and Lowery are returning to their roots. For Redford, a role as a lifelong bank robber feels like a fitting cap to a career effectively launched half a century ago with his role alongside Paul Newman in Butch Cassidy and the Sundance Kid." In August 2018, Redford announced his retirement from acting after completion of the film, though the following month, Redford stated that he "regretted" announcing his retirement because "you never know".

Redford briefly reprised his role as Alexander Pierce with a cameo in Avengers: Endgame, filmed in 2017 before the completion of the former film. In 2023, Redford made an uncredited voice-only cameo in the HBO miniseries White House Plumbers as Bob Woodward, reprising his role from All the President's Men. On the AMC series Dark Winds Redford, an executive producer, made a cameo alongside fellow executive producer George R. R. Martin portraying a detainee playing chess. The episode aired in March 2025, and marked his final acting performance.

== Filmography and accolades ==
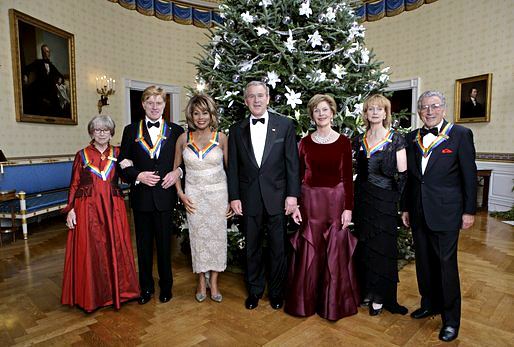
U.S. President George W. Bush and First Lady Laura Bush pose with the Kennedy Center honorees (L-R), actress Julie Harris, actor Redford, singer Tina Turner, ballet dancer Suzanne Farrell and singer Tony Bennett on December 4, 2005, at a reception in the Blue Room at the White House.

In his directing debut, Redford won the 1980 Academy Award for Best Director for the film Ordinary People. He was a 2002 Academy Honorary Award recipient at the 74th Academy Awards. In 2017, he was awarded the Golden Lion for Lifetime Achievement at the 74th Venice Film Festival. On February 22, 2019, Redford received the Honorary César at the 44th César Awards in Paris.

Redford attended the University of Colorado in the 1950s and received an honorary degree in 1988. In 1989, the National Audubon Society awarded Redford its highest honor, the Audubon Medal. In 1995, he received an honorary Doctor of Humane Letters degree from Bard College. Redford received an honorary doctorate from Brown University in 2008. He was a 2010 recipient of the New Mexico Governor's Award for Excellence in the Arts. In 2014, Redford was named by Time magazine as one of the 100 most influential people in the world. In May 2015, Redford delivered the commencement address and received an honorary degree from Colby College in Maine.

In 1996, he was awarded the National Medal of Arts from President Bill Clinton. On October 14, 2010, Redford was appointed chevalier of the Légion d'honneur by President Nicolas Sarkozy. On November 22, 2016, President Barack Obama honored Redford with a Presidential Medal of Freedom. In December 2005, he received the Kennedy Center Honors for his contributions to American culture. The honors recipients are recognized for their lifetime contributions to American culture through the performing arts: whether in dance, music, theater, opera, motion pictures, or television.

In 2008, Redford received The Dorothy and Lillian Gish Prize, one of the richest prizes in the arts, given annually to "a man or woman who has made an outstanding contribution to the beauty of the world and to mankind's enjoyment and understanding of life." The University of Southern California (USC) School of Dramatic Arts announced the first annual Robert Redford Award for Engaged Artists in 2009. According to the school's website, the award was created "to honor those who have distinguished themselves not only in the exemplary quality, skill and innovation of their work, but also in their public commitment to social responsibility, to increasing awareness of global issues and events and to inspiring and empowering young people."

== Other ventures ==
=== Sundance Film Festival ===
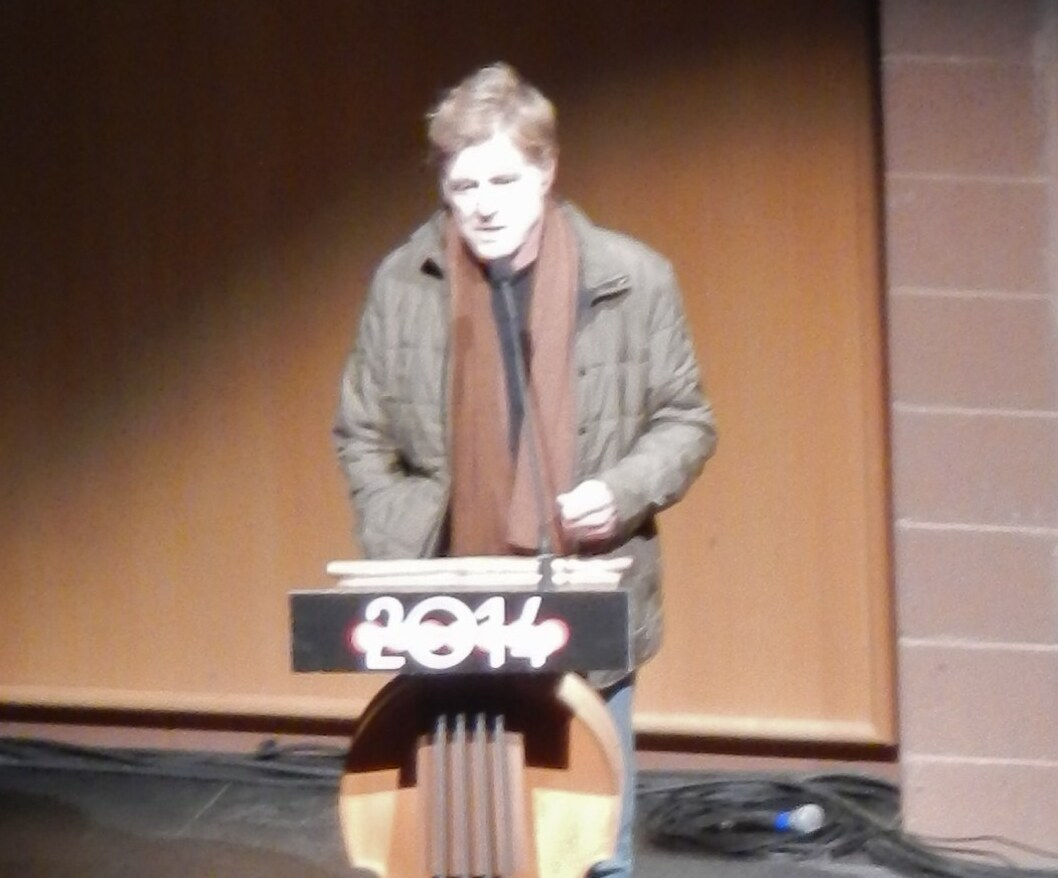
Redford speaking on opening night of the 2014 Sundance Film Festival

With the financial proceeds of his acting success, starting with his salaries from Butch Cassidy and the Sundance Kid and Downhill Racer, Redford bought a ski area on the east side of Mount Timpanogos, located in the Wasatch Mountains northeast of Provo, Utah, called "Timp Haven". He renamed it "Sundance" after his Sundance Kid character. Redford's ex-wife Lola was from Utah and they had built a home in the area in 1963. Portions of the movie Jeremiah Johnson (1972), a film which was both one of Redford's favorites and one that heavily influenced him, were shot near the ski area. Redford went on to create the Sundance Film Festival, which became the country's largest festival for independent films. The festival, which was initially known as the Utah/US festival, eventually would be named for Redford's "Sundance" land. In 2008, Sundance exhibited 125 feature-length films from 34 countries, with more than 50,000 attendees in Salt Lake City and Park City, Utah. Robert Redford also founded the Sundance Institute, Sundance Cinemas, Sundance Catalog and the Sundance Channel, all in and around Park City, 30 miles (48 km) north of the Sundance ski area. Redford also owned a Park City restaurant, Zoom, that closed in May 2017.

=== Production companies ===
Redford was the co-owner of Wildwood Enterprises, Inc., with Bill Holderman, producer, with the following film credits: Lions for Lambs; Quiz Show; A River Runs Through It; Ordinary People; The Horse Whisperer; The Legend of Bagger Vance; Slums of Beverly Hills; The Motorcycle Diaries; and The Conspirator.

Redford was the president and co-founder of Sundance Productions, with Laura Michalchyshyn. Sundance Productions produced Chicagoland (CNN), Cathedrals of Culture (Berlin Film Festival), The March (PBS) and Emmy nominee All The President's Men Revisited (Discovery), Isabella Rossellini's Green Porno Live! and To Russia With Love on Epix.

Following his founding of the nonprofit Sundance Institute in Park City, Utah, in 1981, Redford was deeply involved with independent film. Through its various workshop programs and popular film festival, Sundance has provided support for independent filmmakers. In 1995, Redford signed a deal with Showtime to start a 24-hour cable television channel devoted to airing independent films. The Sundance Channel premiered on February 29, 1996.

== Personal life ==
=== Marriage and family ===
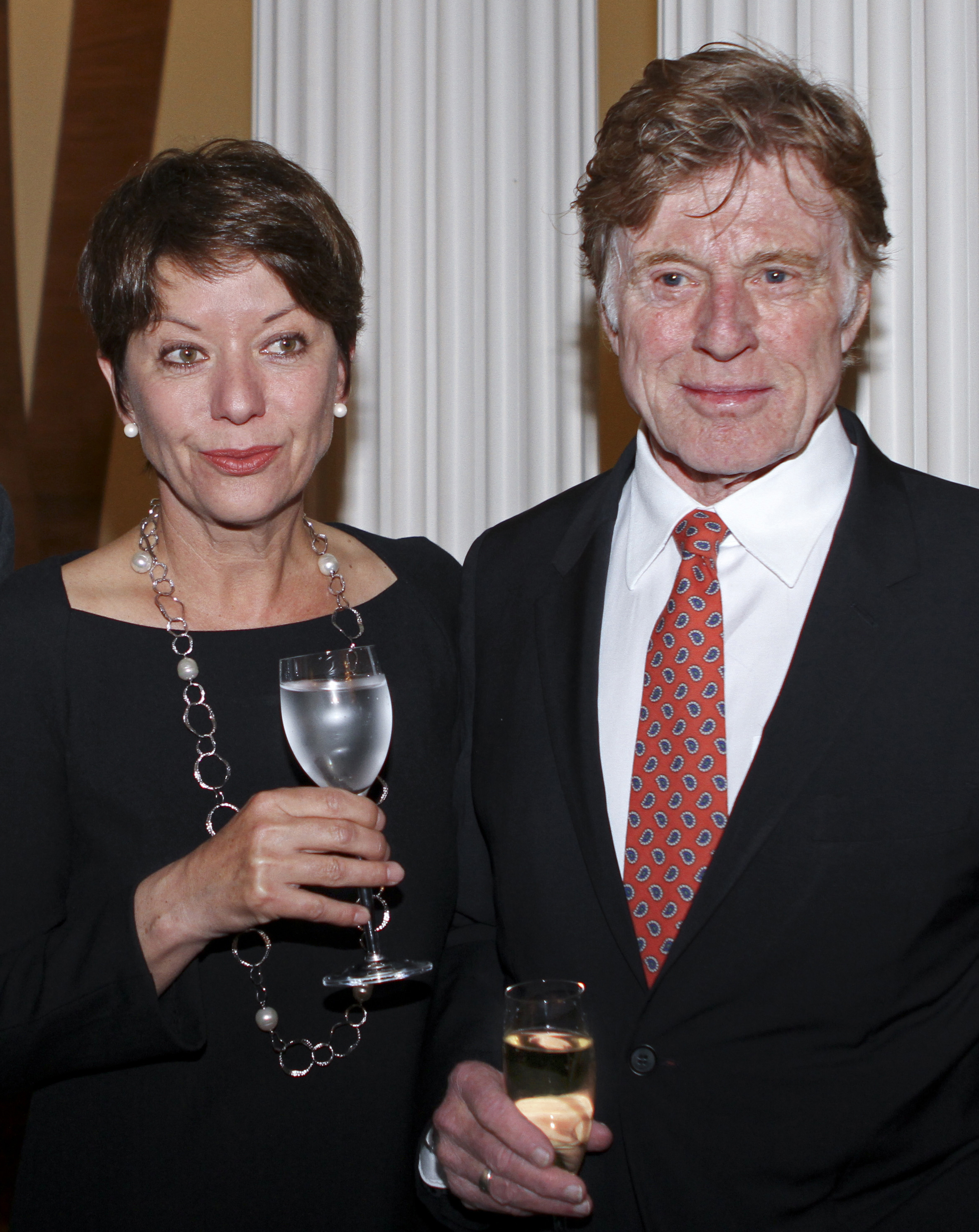
Redford in 2012 with second wife Sibylle Szaggars

On August 9, 1958, Redford married Lola Van Wagenen in Las Vegas. The couple had four children: Scott Anthony, Shauna Jean, David James and Amy Hart. Scott died of sudden infant death syndrome (SIDS) at the age of 2½ months. Shauna is a painter and married to journalist Eric Schlosser. James was a writer and producer who died of cancer in 2020. Amy is an actress, director and producer. Redford had seven grandchildren.

Redford and Van Wagenen never publicly announced a separation or divorce, but in 1982, entertainment columnist Shirley Eder reported that the pair "have been very much apart for a number of years." Redford was negotiating their divorce settlement while filming Out of Africa in 1984. In 1991, Parade magazine said, "it is unclear whether the divorce has been finalized."

On July 11, 2009, Redford and his longtime girlfriend, Sibylle Szaggars, married at the Louis C. Jacob Hotel in Hamburg, Germany. She had moved in with Redford in 1996 and shared his home in Sundance, Utah. In May 2011, Robert Redford: The Biography was published by Alfred A. Knopf, written by Michael Feeney Callan with Redford's cooperation, drawing extensively from his personal papers, diaries and taped interviews.

Although Redford primarily resided at the Sundance Resort in Utah, he owned a house in Tiburon, California, which was sold in 2024. He also had a property in Santa Fe, New Mexico.

=== Political activism ===
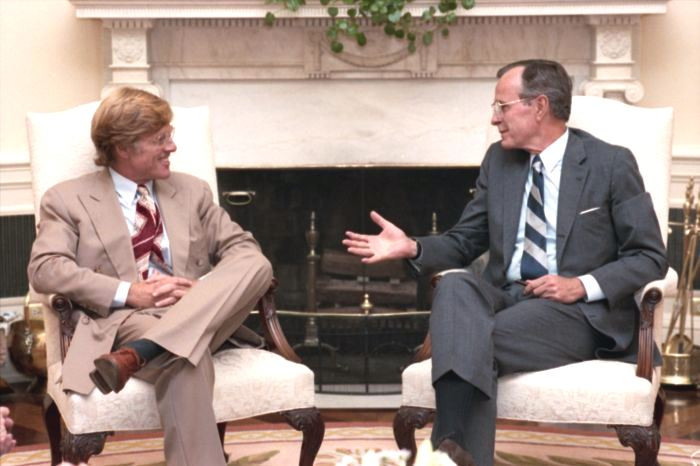
Redford with U.S. president George H. W. Bush in 1989

Redford supported environmentalism, Native American rights, LGBT rights, and the arts. He was a supporter of advocacy groups like the Political Action Committee of the Directors Guild of America. He was the executive producer and narrator of the documentary film Incident at Oglala, about American Indian Movement activist Leonard Peltier.

Redford supported Brent Cornell Morris in his unsuccessful campaign for the Republican nomination for Utah's 3rd congressional district in 1990. Redford also supported Gary Herbert, another Republican and a friend, in Herbert's successful 2004 campaign to be elected lieutenant governor of Utah. Herbert later became governor of that state.

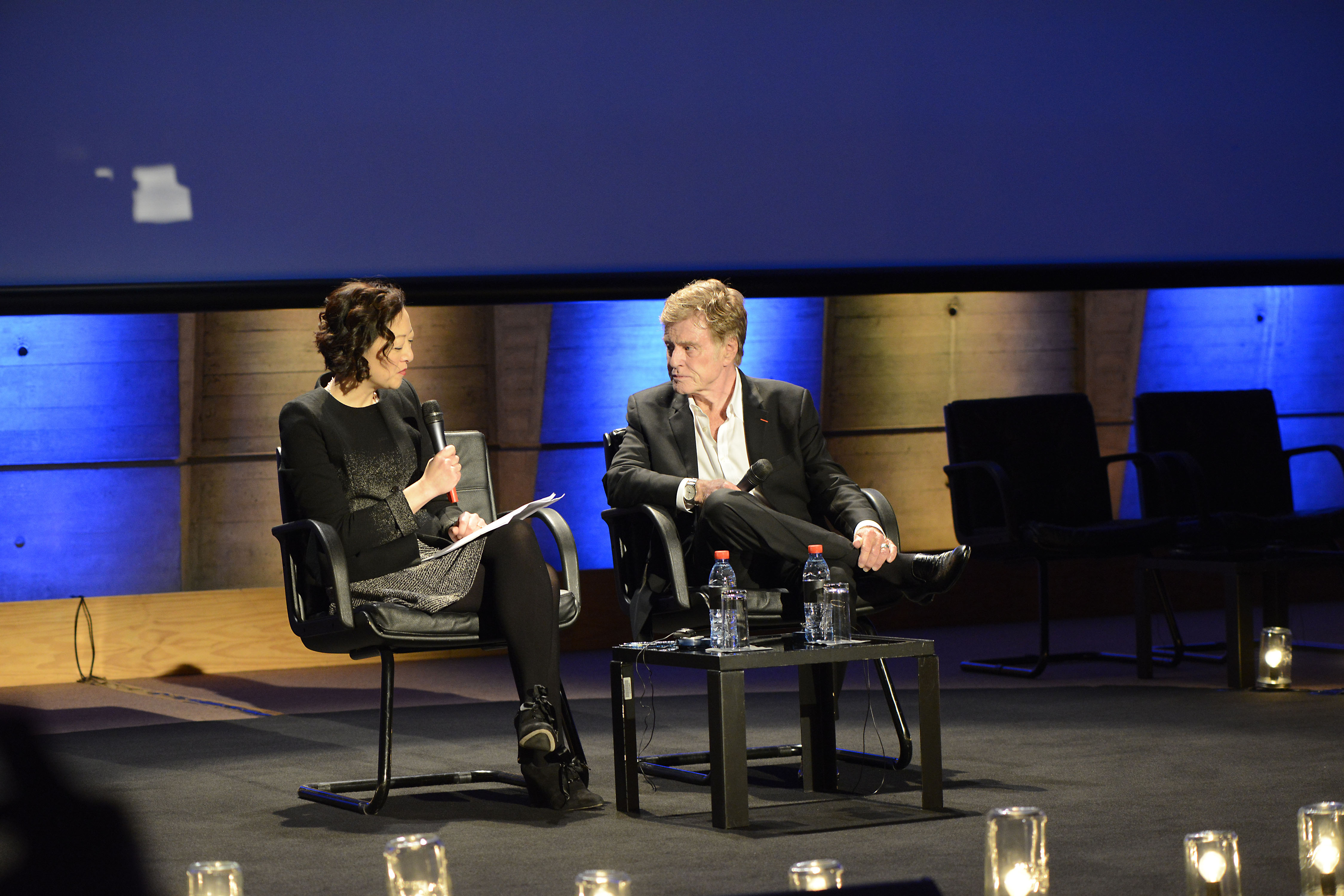
Redford during an appearance at the 2015 United Nations Climate Change Conference

As an avid environmentalist, Redford was a trustee of the Natural Resources Defense Council. He also served as vice president for The Way of the Rain, a group that raises awareness about environmental issues through artistic performances, for which Sibylle Szaggars Redford is founder and president. He endorsed Democratic president Barack Obama for re-election in 2012. Redford was quoted on the back cover of Donald Trump's book Crippled America (2015), saying of Trump's candidacy, "I'm glad he's in there, being the way he is and saying what he says and the ways he says it, I think shakes things up and I think that is very needed." A representative later clarified that Redford's statement, taken from a longer conversation with Larry King, was not intended to endorse Trump for president.

In 2019, Redford penned an op-ed in which he referred to Trump's administration as a "monarchy in disguise" and stated "[i]t's time for Trump to go". Redford later co-authored another op-ed in which he criticized Trump's handling of the COVID-19 pandemic while also citing the collective public response to the pandemic as a model for how to respond to climate change. He criticized the decision to withdraw from the Paris Agreement. In July 2020, Redford penned an op-ed in which he stated that President Trump lacks a "moral compass". In the same piece, he announced that he would be supporting Joe Biden in the 2020 presidential election.

Redford was opposed to the TransCanada Corporation's Keystone Pipeline. In 2013, he was identified by its CEO Russ Girling as leading the anti-pipeline protest movement. In April 2014, Redford, a Pitzer College Trustee, and Pitzer College President Laura Skandera Trombley announced that the college would divest fossil fuel stocks from its endowment; at the time, it was the higher-education institution with the largest endowment in the U.S. to make this commitment. In November 2012, Pitzer launched the Robert Redford Conservancy for Southern California Sustainability at Pitzer College.

=== Death and tributes ===
Redford died in his sleep at his home in Sundance, Utah, on September 16, 2025, at the age of 89. Several of Redford's co-stars paid tribute to him, including frequent collaborator Jane Fonda, who wrote, "He meant a lot to me and was a beautiful person in every way. He stood for an America that we have to keep fighting for." Fonda later added: "I was always in love with him. The most gorgeous human being and such great values. And he did a lot for movies, he really changed movies, lifted up independent movies." His Out of Africa co-star Meryl Streep wrote, "One of the lions has passed. Rest in peace, my lovely friend." His The Way We Were co-star Barbra Streisand released a lengthy statement, which read in part, "Bob was charismatic, intelligent, intense, always interesting—and one of the finest actors ever." Streisand later appeared at the 98th Academy Awards to talk about her positive memory of working with him. His All the President's Men co-star Dustin Hoffman paid tribute to Redford, writing, "Working with Redford...was one of the greatest experiences I've ever had...I'll miss him".

Journalist Bob Woodward, whom Redford portrayed in All the President's Men, also paid tribute, calling Redford a close friend and a "principled force for good". Others who commented on Redford's death include politicians such as incumbent U.S. president Donald Trump, former U.S. president Barack Obama, former First Lady Hillary Clinton and former vice president Al Gore. Numerous prominent figures from the entertainment industry paid tribute to Redford, including filmmakers such as Martin Scorsese and Ron Howard, and actors such as Morgan Freeman, Leonardo DiCaprio, Julianne Moore, Mark Ruffalo, Scarlett Johansson and Reese Witherspoon.

Redford was buried on his property in Sundance after a private funeral. At the 98th Academy Awards, Barbra Streisand eulogized Redford during the in memoriam segment. She also briefly sang "The Way We Were".

== Legacy and reception ==
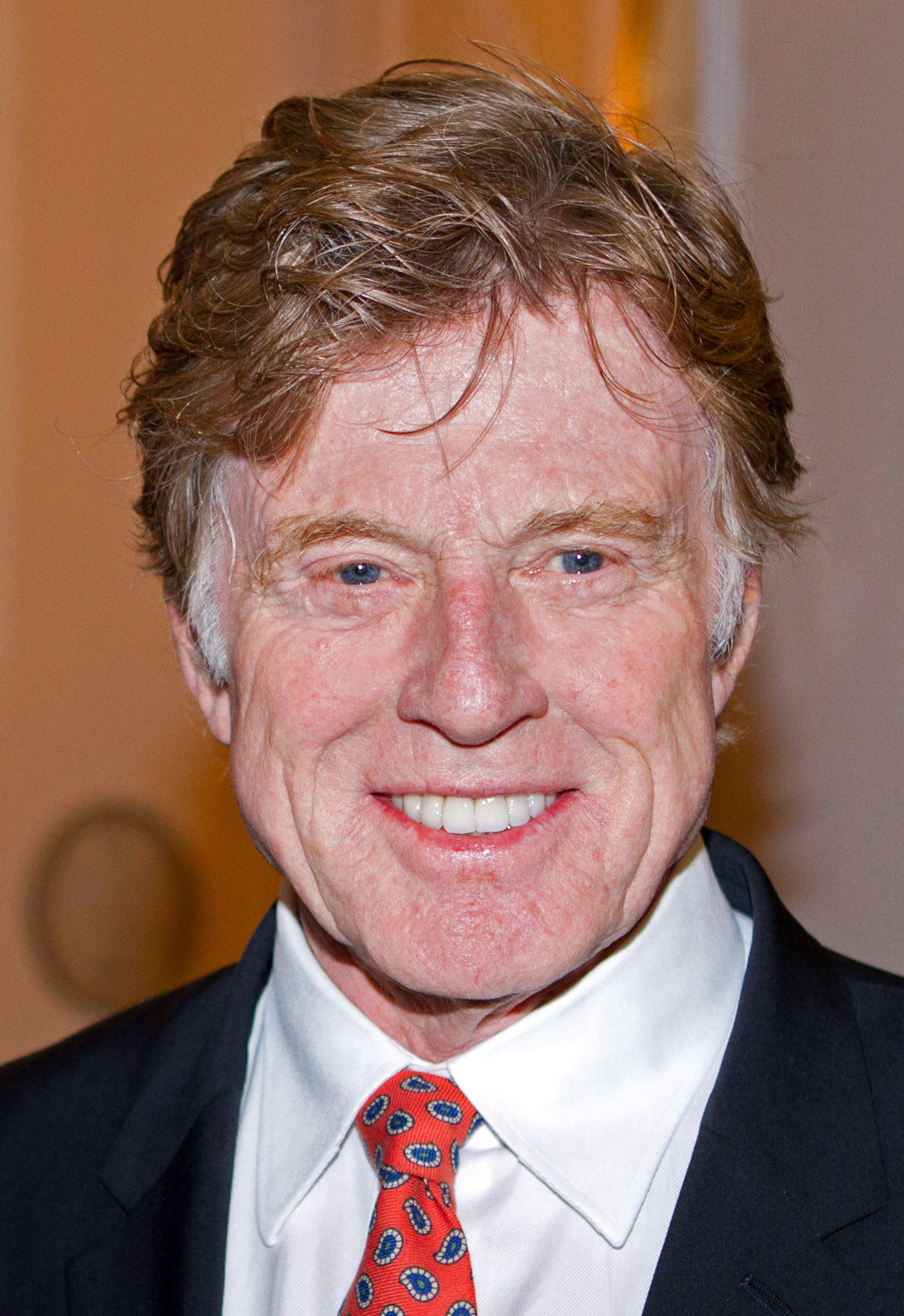
Redford in 2012

During his career, Redford was often described as a sex symbol, particularly during the 1970s. The BBC News called his appeal "all-American good looks [that] couldn't be ignored". The Associated Press noted that Redford's "wavy blond hair and boyish grin made him the most desired of leading men" during the height of his career. However, Redford himself rejected the label of being a sex symbol. In a 1974 interview with The New York Times, Redford responded to his image as a symbol by saying "I never thought of myself as a glamorous guy, a handsome guy, any of that stuff. Suddenly, there's this image...Glamour[sic] image can be a real handicap. It is crap."

Following Redford's death, an obituary published in Variety remarked that he "became a godfather for independent film as founder of the Sundance Film Institute", that "as a movie star in his prime, few could touch him" and that "in his '70s heyday, few actors possessed Redford's star wattage". Writing for The Guardian, Andrew Pulver characterized Redford as a "giant of American cinema" and "one of the defining movie stars of the 1970s, crossing with ease between the Hollywood New Wave and the mainstream film industry". The Los Angeles Times remembered Redford as a "generational icon". In France, Culture Minister Rachida Dati praised him as "a giant of American cinema". As the founder of Sundance Film Festival, he has been described as a "godfather of independent cinema".

The New York Times noted that Redford's films were known for depicting serious topics such as corruption and grief, as he wanted his films to carry "cultural weight" and that Redford took "risks by exploring dark and challenging material". He was hailed as one of "few truly iconic screen figures of the past half-century" and as "Hollywood's Golden Boy" by The Hollywood Reporter. Filmmaker Ron Howard praised Redford and his work, calling him "a tremendously influential cultural figure" and an "artistic gamechanger". His creation of the Sundance Film Festival was credited as a "boost [to] independent film-making". After he was awarded the Presidential Medal of Freedom in 2016, The Salt Lake Tribune called Redford's Sundance Film Festival a "catalyst for an explosion of independent films".

Time noted Redford's environmental activism, calling him "fiercely dedicated to pushing for a world that was habitable for all" and mentioning that the Redford Foundation helped support environmentally friendly filmmaking. His environmental awareness led to Fox News remembering Redford as a "Hollywood icon" [who] "committed himself to being a good steward of the environmental movement and a champion of the American Southwest". In 2016, then-president Barack Obama called Redford "one of the foremost conservationists of our generation".
