= The Company You Keep (film) =

2012 film by Robert Redford

- U.S. theatrical release poster
- Directed by: Robert Redford
- Written by: Lem Dobbs
- Based on: The Company You Keep by Neil Gordon
- Produced by: Nicolas Chartier; Robert Redford; Bill Holderman
- Starring: Robert Redford; Shia LaBeouf; Julie Christie; Susan Sarandon
- Cinematography: Adriano Goldman
- Edited by: Mark Day
- Music by: Cliff Martinez
- Production company: Voltage Pictures
- Distributed by: Sony Pictures Classics
- Release dates: September 6, 2012 (Venice); April 5, 2013 (U.S.; theatrical)
- Running time: 125 minutes
- Country: United States
- Language: English
- Budget: $2 million (est.)
- Box office: $19.6 million

The Company You Keep is a 2012 American political thriller film starring Robert Redford and Shia LaBeouf and directed by Redford. The script was written by Lem Dobbs based on the 2003 novel of the same name by Neil Gordon. The film was produced by Nicolas Chartier (Voltage Pictures), Redford and Bill Holderman.

The story centers on recent widower and single father Jim Grant, a former Weather Underground anti-Vietnam War militant wanted for a bank robbery and murder. Grant has hidden from the FBI for over 30 years, as an attorney in Albany, New York. He becomes a fugitive when his true identity is exposed by Ben Shepard, an aggressive young reporter. Grant must find his ex-lover, Mimi, the one person who can clear his name, before the FBI catches him. Otherwise, he will lose everything, including his 11-year-old daughter Isabel. While Ben struggles with ethical issues as a journalist, Jim and his old friends from the Weather Underground must live with the consequences of their radical past.

After film festival screenings in September 2012, the film's first theatrical release was in Italy in December 2012. A U.S. limited release began in April 2013, followed by wider release later in the month and releases in various foreign markets through December 2013. The film received a mixed reception from the critics in the U.S. but a generally favorable one abroad. It grossed $5.1 million in the U.S. and Canada, with foreign sales reaching $14.5 million.

== Plot ==
Widowed single father Jim Grant is a former Weather Underground militant wanted for a 1980 Michigan bank robbery and murder of a security guard. Hiding from the FBI for over thirty years, he works as a defense attorney near Albany, New York. When Sharon Solarz, another former Weather Underground member, is arrested by the FBI in 2011, ambitious reporter Ben Shepard seizes the opportunity to break a national story. Ben presses his ex-girlfriend, Diana, an FBI agent, for information about the case. She suggests he find Billy Cusimano, an old hippie friend of Sharon's. Disappointed that Jim refuses to take Sharon's case, Billy mentions this to Ben.

Ben tries to question Jim, but Jim is evasive. Spooked by the federal investigation, Jim flees with his 11-year-old daughter Isabel. Ben discovers that Mimi Lurie, a participant in the Michigan bank robbery, was last seen in Canada and that Jim had no Social Security number before 1979. He digs up Jim Grant's California death certificate. Ben concludes that Jim is really Nick Sloan, another former Weatherman, and writes an article about it, creating a sensation and accelerating the FBI's interest.

Jim and Isabel arrive in New York City and check into a hotel. The manhunt for Jim/Nick is now national news. While Isabel is sleeping, Jim hides the room key in the hotel lobby with legal papers giving his brother, Daniel Sloan, guardianship of Isabel. Daniel retrieves them and Isabel. FBI agents track Daniel to the hotel and nearly catch Jim there, but Jim creates a diversion and escapes. FBI agents spot Daniel leaving with Isabel and stop them. Sharon refuses to provide any information to the FBI but agrees to talk to Ben. Unrepentant about her radical activism in the Underground, she reveals that Nick and Mimi had a love affair long ago. Ben questions Daniel.

Jim goes to Milwaukee to see Donal, his old best friend, who discourages him from seeking Mimi but suggests he contact former SDS member, history professor Jed Lewis. Jed opposed using violence, resenting the Underground for endangering nonviolent counterparts. Learning that Jim has a young daughter, he uses his old connections to track down Mimi. Mimi imports marijuana into the U.S. as part of an operation in Big Sur, California, run by Mac McLeod, Mimi's boyfriend. Jim reaches Mac, who says that Mimi went "inland". Jim knows where she is.

Ben realizes that Jim is not acting like a guilty man. Defying his boss, he goes to Michigan to investigate the original crime. He meets retired cop Henry Osborne, the first person who investigated the robbery. Osborne refuses to talk in front of his adopted daughter Rebecca; Ben senses he is hiding something important. Ben finds that Osborne had strong connections to Mimi's family before the robbery. He learns of the Linder-Lurie company property on the Michigan upper peninsula near Canada. Osborne acknowledges that if Mimi were to come forward with information that Jim was not present at the robbery (although Jim's car was used), Jim would be cleared of all charges.

Jim meets Mimi in a secluded cabin on the Linder-Lurie property. She is still passionate about the goals of the Weathermen, but Jim argues that life has changed. He asks Mimi to turn herself in and confirm his alibi for his daughter's sake. He doesn't want to leave Isabel behind and repeat the mistake that he and Mimi made 30 years earlier by giving up their daughter. Mimi tells him their daughter is living in Ann Arbor. Ben realizes that Jim was searching for Mimi and that Rebecca is their daughter. He advises Rebecca to speak to her father.

The next morning, Mimi flees the cabin to sail to Canada just as Ben arrives. He reveals that he knows the truth about Rebecca and Osborne; Jim says that Ben must decide whether or not to keep the secret. Jim leaves the cabin so that the FBI will chase him instead of Mimi and is arrested. Rebecca learns the circumstances of her adoption. Mimi returns to give herself up. Jim is freed and reunites with Isabel. Ben decides not to expose Osborne's actions of 30 years before and to protect Rebecca's identity.

== Cast ==
- Robert Redford as Jim Grant/Nick Sloan, a former member of the Weather Underground and widowed father posing as an upstanding lawyer
- Shia LaBeouf as Ben Shepard, a reporter
- Julie Christie as Mimi Lurie, a former member of the Weather Underground
- Susan Sarandon as Sharon Solarz, a former member of the Weather Underground
- Jackie Evancho as Isabel Grant, Jim's 11-year-old daughter, who is unaware of her father's past
- Brendan Gleeson as Henry Osborne, the officer who had first investigated the bank robbery for which Nick Sloan is wanted
- Brit Marling as Rebecca Osborne, Henry's adopted daughter
- Anna Kendrick as Diana, an FBI agent, who had dated Ben and leaks information to him
- Terrence Howard as Cornelius, the FBI agent leading the chase
- Richard Jenkins as Jed Lewis, a college professor with links to the former radicals
- Nick Nolte as Donal Fitzgerald, Jim's old best friend
- Chris Cooper as Daniel Sloan, Nick Sloan's brother
- Sam Elliott as Mac Mcleod, Mimi's boss in the marijuana trade
- Stephen Root as Billy Cusimano, an old friend of Sharon's
- Stanley Tucci as Ray Fuller, Ben's editor at the newspaper
- Keegan Connor Tracy as Jim Grant's secretary

== Production and distribution ==
Produced by Nicolas Chartier (Voltage Pictures), Redford and Bill Holderman, the movie was filmed in Vancouver in late 2011. The film's "moody ... contemporary" score is by Cliff Martinez, its editor is Mark Day, and cinematography is by Adriano Goldman. The first trailer for the movie was released on August 30, 2012.

The film premiered on September 6, 2012, at the 69th Venice International Film Festival and then played at the 2012 Toronto International Film Festival on September 9, 2012. Sony Pictures Classics distributed the movie in the United States, and StudioCanal acquired the United Kingdom distribution rights.

The Company You Keep was released in Italian theatres in December 2012, earning more than $4.8 million there. Its limited release in the U.S. began in New York and Los Angeles on April 5, 2013, after which it received wider North American release. European, Australasian, South American, Middle-Eastern and Asian releases continued from April to December 2013. The first run of the film concluded in the U.S. in July 2013.

The film grossed $5.1 million in the U.S. and Canada, with foreign box office sales reaching $14.5 million (excluding China), for a worldwide theatrical total of $19.6 million. The Company You Keep was released on DVD and Blu-ray on August 13, 2013.

== Reception ==
In early reviews from the Venice Film Festival, Variety called the film an "unabashedly heartfelt but competent tribute to 1960s idealism ... in its stolid, old-fashioned way, it satisfies an appetite, especially among mature auds, for dialogue- and character-driven drama that gets into issues without getting too bogged down in verbiage. ... There is something undeniably compelling, perhaps even romantic, about America's '60s radicals and the compromises they did or didn't make". The Hollywood Reporter praised the cast, especially Sarandon and Marling, and termed the film "a tense yet admirably restrained thriller ... Adapted with clarity and intelligence ... and lent distinguishing heft by its roster of screen veterans, this gripping drama provides an absorbing reflection on the courage and cost of dissent. ... While it provides for some passing commentary on the journalistic process and the slow death of print media, making the ambitious reporter such a driving figure perhaps mutes the focus a little. ... The storytelling is nonetheless robust and thematically rich".

In its U.S. release, the film received mixed reviews. On Rotten Tomatoes the film has an approval rating of 54%, based on 123 reviews, with an average rating of 6.10/10. The site's critical consensus reads, "The Company You Keep is a (frustratingly) slow-burning thriller about very contemporary issues." Metacritic, which uses a weighted average, assigned the film a score of 57 out of 100, based on 35 critics, indicating "mixed or average" reviews. Time magazine wrote: "With a welcome mixture of juice and grit, the movie dramatizes the lingering conundrums of young people in the time of the Vietnam morass. ... [The film] is streaked with melancholy: a disappointment that the second American Revolution never came. ... Nonetheless, this is a pulsating drama of a man who goes on an intricate, often interior journey to outrun his past." NPR's Linda Holmes called the story "undercooked" and thought that "it all seems to have been a lot of noise and running for nothing". Rex Reed wrote in The New York Observer that "From ... a dazzling display of perfect performances, to the complex emotional relationships that result in guilt by association, the disparate elements in The Company You Keep are robustly collated by the keen, well-crafted direction of a master filmmaker at the top of his form."

== TCYK LLC file sharing claims ==
In 2015 TCYK LLC, a US-based copyright-holding company, obtained a court order requiring Sky Broadband, a UK company, to disclose customer information corresponding to IP addresses that it alleged had infringed its copyright to The Company You Keep by unlawfully downloading and sharing the film on the internet during 2013. TCYK LLC then sent letters to dozens of these customers accusing them of such sharing and threatening "adverse costs consequences" for a failure to respond. Sky suggested that its customers contact for assistance Citizens Advice, an organization critical of this practice, known as a "speculative invoicing claim". TCYK LLC later sent a follow-up letter to Sky customers offering to settle the claim for money and other conditions. BBC News reported that the file could have been shared by someone using a customer's Wi-Fi signal.

== Awards ==
Award	Year	Category	Recipient	Result
Venice Film Festival	2012	Giovani Giurati del Vittorio Veneto Film Festival Award	Robert Redford	Won
Venice Film Festival	2012	Open Prize	Robert Redford	Won
