= Sunday in New York (play) =

American romantic comedy play

- Original language: English
- Written by: Norman Krasna
- Genre: Comedy
- Setting: New York City. The Present

Premiere
- Date: 29 November 1961
- Place: Cort Theatre, New York

Sunday in New York was a 1961 American romantic comedy Broadway play written by Norman Krasna, produced by David Merrick, directed by Garson Kanin, and starring Robert Redford. It ran for 188 performances.

It was made into a 1963 film, Sunday in New York, starring Jane Fonda, Rod Taylor and Cliff Robertson. Krasna wrote the screenplay.

== Productions ==
To afford a plane ticket to New York to audition for Sunday in New York, Robert Redford sold a plot of land he owned in California.

Sunday in New York initially had a tryout in Washington, D.C., where it gained publicity when a high school class walked out of a performance after a teacher found the content inappropriate for children. It also had a tryout at Walnut Street Theatre in Philadelphia for one week in 1961.

Sunday in New York opened on Broadway on November 29, 1961. The show closed in May 1962 after 189 performances. The play was estimated to have lost $35,000 on its $125,000 investment, even including sale of the film rights. However subsidiary presentations may have helped push the production into the black.

The play ran for two years in Paris, and had a successful run in Los Angeles in a production starring Marlo Thomas.

== Cast ==
- Pat Harrington Sr. as Man
- Conrad Janis as Adam Taylor
- Sondra Lee as Woman
- Ron Nicholas as Russell Wilson
- Robert Redford as Mike Mitchell
- Pat Stanley as Eileen Taylor

== Critical reception ==
The New York Times called it "inventive and chic. Only the substance is familiar and thin." Walter Kerr called it a "sentimentalised farce... precisely the kind of echo chamber exercise that drives intelligent young theatregoers to complete despair."

Variety wrote "the show has ribtickling lines and farcical situations." Another review in the same magazine called it "a synthetic, frivolous, amusing comedy."

Redford later said he liked the jokes but felt the play was "not up to the standard of a Kanin-Gordon script". However the New York Times review was positive enough to ensure a semi-decent run and give Redford his first significant stage success. He was given a Theatre World Award for his performance.

Redford's appearance in the play would later help him be cast in Barefoot in the Park. It also contributed to George Roy Hill casting him in Butch Cassidy and the Sundance Kid because it gave Hill confidence Redford could handle comedy.

== Awards and nominations ==
=== Original Broadway production ===
Year	Award	Category	Nominee	Result
1962	Tony Award	Best Featured Actress in a Play	Pat Stanley	Nominated

== See also ==
- List of American plays

== Sources ==
- Callan, Michael Feeney (2011). Robert Redford: The Biography. New York: Alfred A. Knopf. ISBN 978-1-6112-9577-1.
- Freedland, Michael (1988). Jane Fonda: A Biography. New York: St. Martin's Press. ISBN 978-0-3120-1048-5.
- Kiernan, Thomas (1982). Jane Fonda: Heroine for Our Time. New York: Delilah Books. ISBN 978-0-9333-2821-1.
