= Sacred Planet =

- Theatrical release poster
- Directed by: Jon Long; Hairul Salleh Askor
- Written by: Karen Fernandez Long; Jon Long
- Produced by: Jon Long; Karen Fernandez Long
- Starring: Arapata McKay; Tsaan Ciqae; Mae Tui; Cy Peck Jr.; Mutang Urud
- Narrated by: Robert Redford
- Cinematography: William Reeve
- Edited by: Jon Long
- Production companies: Allied Films; New Street; Living Films
- Distributed by: Buena Vista Pictures Distribution (Note: Released through the Walt Disney Pictures banner.)
- Release date: April 22, 2004
- Running time: 40 minutes
- Countries: Canada; Malaysia; United States
- Language: English
- Box office: $1.1 million

Sacred Planet is a 2004 documentary film directed by Jon Long and Hairul Salleh Askor, with narration provided by Robert Redford. The film was released by Walt Disney Pictures on April 22, 2004, and grossed $1.1 million.

== Cast ==
- Arapata McKay
- Tsaan Ciqae
- Mae Tui
- Cy Peck Jr.
- Mutang Urud
