= War Hunt =

1962 film by Denis Sanders

- Directed by: Denis Sanders
- Written by: Stanford Whitmore
- Produced by: Terry Sanders; Denis Sanders; Noel Black
- Starring: John Saxon; Robert Redford
- Cinematography: Ted McCord
- Edited by: John Hoffman; Edward Dutko
- Music by: Bud Shank
- Production company: T-D Enterprises
- Distributed by: United Artists
- Release date: May 1962
- Running time: 83 minutes
- Country: United States
- Language: English
- Budget: $250,000

War Hunt is a 1962 war film directed by Denis Sanders and starring John Saxon, Robert Redford and Charles Aidman. Produced by Terry Sanders for T-D Enterprises, and released by United Artists, the film features the film debuts of Sydney Pollack and Tom Skerritt and the first major role for Redford. Redford and Pollack met on the set of the film as actors.

The National Board of Review named the film as one of the ten best films of 1962. It won the Silver Sail best feature film award at the 1962 Locarno International Film Festival and was nominated for a UN BAFTA award in 1964.

== Plot ==
Near the end of the Korean War, a replacement, Private Loomis, is assigned to an infantry company on the front line. One night, Loomis notices a soldier leaving camp in dark clothing and face paint. He learns that this is Private Endore, who routinely infiltrates enemy lines. The company's commander, Captain Pratt, allows Endore to act independently because, after many of these nighttime excursions, he has returned with useful information. However, Endore is also knifing to death enemy soldiers and, as Loomis himself witnesses during a night patrol, conducts an odd circle-ritual around each of his murdered victims. The other men in the company steer clear of Endore and warn Loomis, who is prone to asking probing questions, not to "mess with that guy".

Endore's only friend is a Korean orphan, nicknamed Charlie, with whom Loomis tries to cultivate a friendship. He suggests to Endore that the boy should be placed in an orphanage where he will at least have other children around and some kind of basic lifestyle. This brings Loomis into conflict with a demonstrably psychotic Endore, who plans to remain in Korea after the war ends, and to keep Charlie with him.

The tension comes to a head when the armistice occurs. Endore, in direct defiance of company orders, once more dons dark clothing and takes Charlie to cross enemy lines. Loomis, alarmed that this could impact the armistice, approaches his company sergeant Van Horn (Pollack) about Endore. The two soldiers are forced to bring Endore's actions to Pratt's attention. Pratt, realizing he has let Endore have too free a hand, asks the men for volunteers to bring Endore back, but only Loomis and Van Horn agree to join him.

The group finally locates Endore, who has taken Charlie behind enemy lines and resists Pratt's orders to return. Endore grabs a knife and attempts to attack Pratt after beating up Van Horn. Despite Loomis' pleas, Pratt shoots the deranged Endore and Charlie flees in the ensuing confusion. The resolution suggests that Charlie, having been influenced and given lessons in killing by Endore, will grow into the same kind of man.

== Cast ==
- John Saxon as Private Raymond Endore
- Robert Redford as Private Roy Loomis
- Charles Aidman as Captain Wallace Pratt
- Sydney Pollack as Master Sergeant Owen Van Horn
- Tommy Matsuda as Charlie
- Gavin MacLeod as Private Crotty
- Anthony Ray as Private Joshua Fresno
- Tom Skerritt as Sergeant Stan Showalter
- William Challee as Lieutenant Colonel
- Nancy Hsueh as Mama San
- Francis Ford Coppola as Truck Driver

== Production ==
The film was shot in 15 days for US$250,000. Francis Ford Coppola drove a truck in the film and associate producer Noel Black worked as an electrician. The Sanders brothers, who started in Hollywood as second unit directors of the river sequences in The Night of the Hunter, shot most of the film at night to hide their low budget.

Producer Terry Sanders sent the script to the Pentagon in the hope that the Army might provide technical assistance. The Army replied that it objected to many portions of the script, such as a private soldier being an independent professional killer with his commanding officer's approval, a scene in which the captain calls a sergeant an "idiot", and scenes the Army thought "too gruesome to be in good taste".

John Saxon received top billing, but the film is best remembered for Robert Redford's appearance.

== Reception ==
Bosley Crowther of The New York Times called the film "one of the most original and haunting war movies in years" and said "most of this picture is pure unvarnished gold".

== See also ==
- List of American films of 1962
