= Navajo Wars =

Series of wars fought by Navajo Indians in the Southwest

- Part of the American Indian Wars
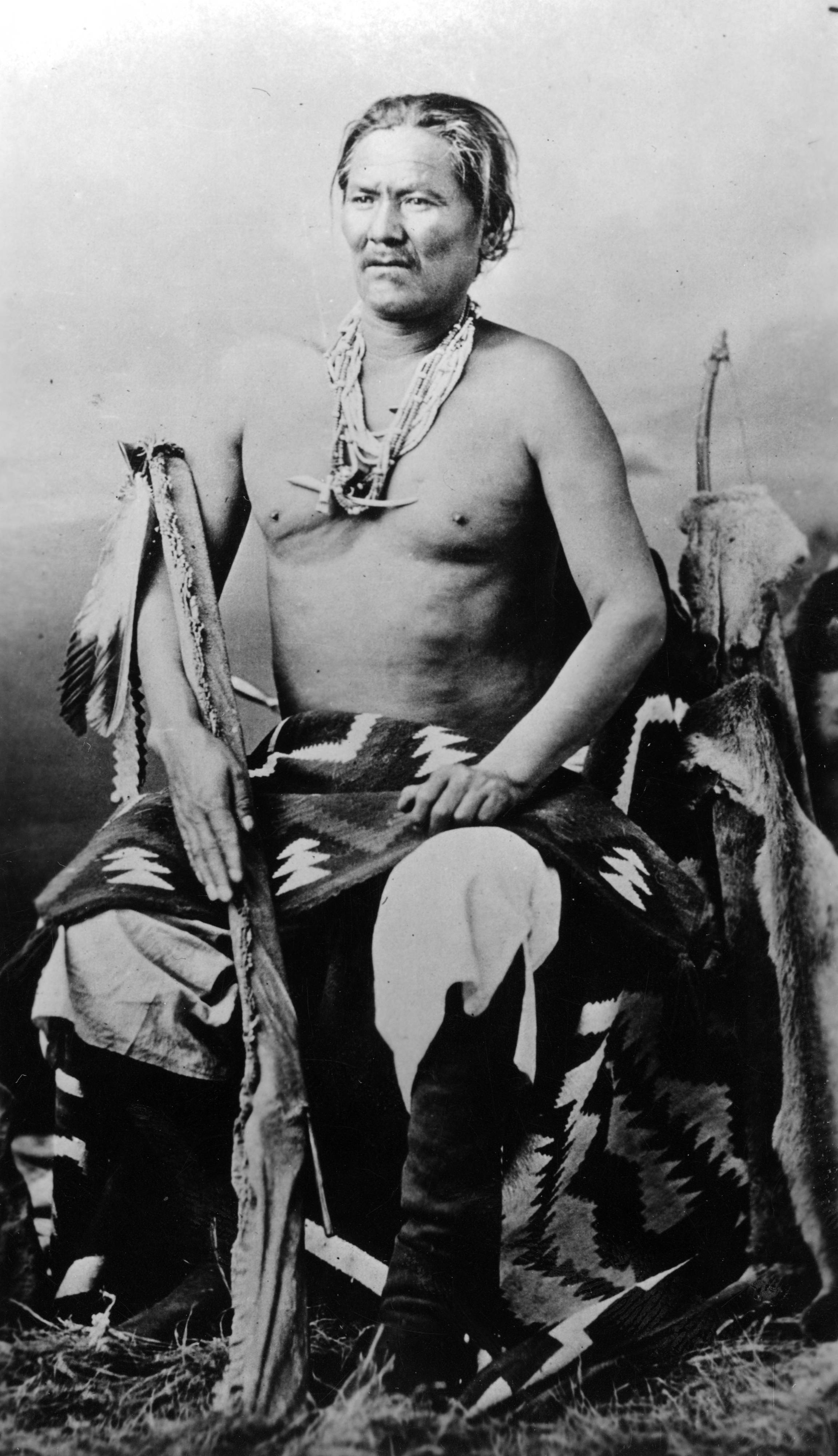
- Manuelito, a Navajo chief.
Date	c. 1600–1866
Location	Southwest United States
Result	United States victory; Navajo moved to reservations in the United States.

Belligerents
Spain (1600–1821); Mexico (1821–1848); United States (1849–1866)	Navajo

Commanders and leaders
(Spain) Facundo Melgares (Mexico) José Antonio Vizcarra (United States) Edwin Sumner (United States) Alexander Doniphan (United States) Kit Carson	Narbona; Barboncito; Manuelito

The term Navajo Wars covers at least three distinct periods of conflict in the American West: the Navajo against the Spanish (late 16th century through 1821); the Navajo against the Mexican government (1821 through 1848); and the Navajo (Diné) against the United States (after the 1847–48 Mexican–American War). These conflicts ranged from small-scale raiding to large expeditions mounted by governments into territory controlled by the Navajo. The Navajo Wars also encompass the widespread raiding that took place throughout the period; the Navajo raided other tribes and nearby settlements, who in return raided into Navajo territory, creating a cycle of raiding that perpetuated the conflict.

== Spanish period ==
Facundo Melgares, the last Spanish governor of New Mexico before independence in 1821, conducted two unsuccessful expeditions against the Navajo, who were attacking the New Mexican settlers. In October 1821 he sued for peace.

=== Timeline ===
- 1582: Espejo-Beltrain "found here peaceful Indian mountaineers" called Querechos. This party did not linger around Acoma because the Querechose who carried on trade with the Pueblo were known to come to their aid in times of conflict
- 1630: Fray Benevides arranges a peace between the Tewas and Navajo.
- 1638: Governor Luis de Rosa encourages Navajo to raid the missions of his political enemy the Franciscan friars.
- 1641–1642: Franciscan friars mount a military campaign against Navajo, burning corn, taking prisoners, and killing some.
- 1644–1647: Spanish fight Navajo living along the San Juan River.
- 1659: Bernardo Lopez sends 40 Spanish soldiers and 800 allies into Navajo land.
- 1661: Lopez sanctions killing and capture of Navajo as slaves who came to Tewa to trade.
- 1669: Spanish attack Navajo near Acoma.
- 1677–1678: Navajo actively raiding Spanish pueblos. Spanish mount three different scorched earth and slave gathering campaigns.
- 1680: Navajo probably join Pueblos. Start of Great Southwestern Revolt against Spanish.
- 1691: Navajo alert Pueblos and Apaches that Spanish force was on its way.
- 1696: Navajo said to be inciting other tribes, combined with Texas in revolt.
- 1698–1699: End of Great Southwestern Revolt; Spanish boundaries remain constant.
- 1705: Francisco Cuervo y Valdés sends Roque Madrid with about 100 Spanish soldiers and ordinary citizens together with some 300 Pueblo Indian allies to attack the Navajo in northern New Mexico, in August of that year.

== Mexican period ==
Melgares's successor, Governor José Antonio Vizcarra met Navajo leaders at Paguate on 12 February 1823. His terms essentially stated that the Mexicans would settle the Navajo in pueblos and energetically convert them to the Catholic religion. The Navajo were not interested in either of these proposals. They rejected the treaty and renewed the fight. Six New Mexicans were killed at Socorro in April and eight more at Sabinal in May. On 18 June 1823, Vizcarra led 1,500 troops in a 74-day expedition against the Navajo of western New Mexico. His route took him through the Chuska Mountains to the Hopi mesas in what is now Arizona, then north towards Utah, reaching Oljeto Creek in what is now San Juan County, Utah. Thirty-three Navajo were killed, of whom eight were women, and about 30 were captured. The expedition reached Canyon de Chelly in what is now eastern Arizona.

In retaliation for Vizcarra's expedition, the Navajo raided Socorro again, and attacked Tome, Albuquerque, and reached the outskirts of Santa Fe. The 1823 raid marked the start of a long period of raids and counter raids lasting until 1848 as New Mexicans took Navajo captive to work as slaves, and as Navajo raided to recover their people and to obtain livestock.

== American period ==
The U.S. military assumed nominal control of the southwest from Mexico by 1846. And raids continued between the Navajo and the New Mexican civilians.

=== 1846: Bear Springs Treaty ===
Following an invitation from a small party of American soldiers under the command of Captain John Reid who journeyed deep into Navajo country and contacted him, Narbona and other Navajo negotiated a treaty of peace with Colonel Alexander Doniphan on November 21, 1846, at Bear Springs, Ojo del Oso (later the site of Fort Wingate). The treaty was not honored by young Navajo raiders who continued to steal stock from New Mexican villages and herders.

=== 1849: Washington Expedition ===
On August 16, 1849, the US Army began an expedition into the heart of Navajo country on an organized reconnaissance to impress the Navajo with the might of the U.S. military. They also mapped the terrain and planned forts. Col. John Washington, the military governor of New Mexico at the time, led the expedition. Forces included nearly 1000 infantry (US and New Mexican volunteers), hundreds of horses and mules, a supply train, 55 Pueblo scouts, and four artillery guns. On August 29–30, 1849, Washington's expedition needed water, and began pillaging Navajo cornfields. Mounted Navajo warriors darted back and forth around Washington's troops to push them off. Washington reasoned he could pillage Navajo crops because the Navajo would have to reimburse the U.S. government for the cost of the expedition. Washington still suggested to the Navajo that in spite of the hostile situation, they and the whites could "still be friends if the Navajo came with their chiefs the next day and signed a treaty." This is what they did.

The next day Chief Narbona came to Canyon de Chelly for a "talk peace", along with several other headmen. In the treaty the Navajo acknowledged the jurisdiction of the United States and allowed forts and trading posts in Navajo land. The United States, on its part promised "such donations [and] such other liberal and humane measures, as [it] may deem meet and proper". After reaching an accord, a scuffle broke out when a New Mexican thought he saw his stolen horse and tried to claim it from the Navajo. (The Navajo held that the horse had passed through several owners by this time, and rightfully belonged to its Navajo owner). Washington sided with the New Mexican. Since the Navajo owner took his horse and fled the scene, Washington told the New Mexican to pick out any Navajo horse he wanted. The rest of the Navajo also left. At this, Col. Washington ordered his soldiers to fire. Seven Navajo were killed in the volleys; the rest ran and could not be caught. One of the dying was Chief Narbona, who was scalped as he lay dying by a New Mexican souvenir hunter. This massacre prompted the warlike Navajo leaders such as Manuelito to gain influence over those who were advocates of peace.

=== 1851–1860 ===
Col. Edwin Sumner conducted a campaign against the Navajo in 1851. He delegated Maj. Electus Backus to build Fort Defiance in the middle of Diné bikéyah (Navajo territory). Col Sumner entered Canyon de Chelly but Navajo harassment attacks caused him to withdraw.

In 1855 a treaty was signed at Laguna Negra by Manuelito and Zarcillos Largos for the Navajo and Henry L. Dodge (Indian agent), Governor Merriweather, and General John Garland. Two years later a severe drought hit the Navajo and decimated their livestock and agricultural resources, causing a famine in the winter of 1857–1858. A time of social disruption ensued. Surrounding tribes gradually increased their attacks on the weakened Navajo. The Navajo demanded in 1858 that Fort Defiance stop grazing their livestock on prime Navajo land. Soldiers shot 48 cattle and 8 horses belonging to Manuelito. Navajo warriors killed a servant of the commanding officer in retaliation for the killing of their people's livestock without compensation. The United States military demanded the murderer be brought to them, or they would begin a war. The Miles Campaign was sent against them, leaving Fort Defiance on September 9.

=== 1860: Second Battle of Fort Defiance ===
In 1860 the U.S. military, Mexican-Americans, Zunis, and Utes all raided Navajo land. The Navajo killed four soldiers from Fort Defiance in January. On April 29, 1860, Manuelito, Barboncito and 1,000 Navajo attacked Fort Defiance which was defended by elements of the 3rd Infantry Regiment in the Second Battle of Fort Defiance. Meanwhile, others raided sheep near Santa Fe. 400 New Mexicans under Manuel Antonio Chaves formed a militia and raided Navajo land, followed by independent raids by citizens to take captives. In retaliation for the April 1860 attack on Fort Defiance, Canby's Campaign sets out with US Infantry and Dragoons in October 1860. Over the next several months seven army expeditions killed 23 Navajo and destroyed Navajo stock and crops.

On February 18, 1861, another treaty was signed, this time at Fort Fauntleroy (later Fort Wingate). Ft. Defiance was ordered decommissioned on February 24 and the last units departed April 25. Raiding continued between groups of citizens and Navajo warriors. A dispute arose on September 22, 1861, from allegations of cheating at a horse race between Navajo & New Mexican Volunteers forces at Fort Fauntleroy (later Fort Wingate), and Manuel Antonio Chaves of the New Mexico Volunteers ended up ordering his men to fire into the Navajo and on September 25 Fort Fauntleroy was renamed Fort Lyon because Col Thomas T. Fauntleroy left the Union and joined the Provisional Army of Virginia. Being fired upon at a gathering that was supposed to be peaceful incensed the Navajo, and they raided the New Mexicans. Fort Lyon was ordered decommissioned December 12, 1862 and its garrison ordered to Camp San Rafael which is south of present-day Grants, NM which was then renamed Fort Wingate (1). Later, after the Navajo signed the Treaty of June 1868 to return to the treaty reservation the name Fort Wingate (1) was decommissioned and transferred to Fort Lyon when the last group of Navajos returned from Fort Sumner and the Fort Wingate (1) garrison escorted them to the former site of Fort Lyon where upon arrival renamed the old site to present day Fort Wingate (2) in August 1868.

=== 1862: Civil War ===
The Confederate forces pushed up the Rio Grande into New Mexico in 1862, But they were driven back into Texas by Union forces, of the Colorado Volunteers, assisted by some New Mexican Volunteer militia units. With the arrival of the California Volunteers under the command of General James H. Carleton, Fort Wingate was re-established at Ojo del Oso (formerly Fauntleroy). The Navajo took advantage of the distraction caused by the Confederate movements to step up their raids. The citizens complained to the government that Navajo and Apaches stole 30,000 sheep in 1862.

=== 1863: Carson's Campaign ===
In 1863, as raids continued between the Navajo and the New Mexican militia, the New Mexico District Military Governor, General James Henry Carleton, told 18 Navajo chiefs that they must surrender by July 20, 1863, and move to Fort Sumner, at the Bosque Redondo. In July, under orders from Gen. Carleton, Col. Kit Carson began a simultaneous campaign against the Mescelaro Apache and Navajo. In a series of raids and skirmishes Carson's troops began rounding up Navajo and Apache and sending them to Bosque Redondo.

Between September 1863 and January 1864, Carson and his men chased the Navajo, killing and capturing a few. Crops were burned, stock was confiscated, hogans were burned. Carson attempted to capture a Navajo stronghold in the Battle of Canyon de Chelly. Although the army missed destroying the entire force, they destroyed much Navajo property as part of a scorched-earth policy.

=== 1864: The Long Walk ===
Without food or shelter to sustain them through the winters, and continuously chased by the U.S. Army, groups of Navajo began to surrender.

Starting in January 1864, many bands and their leaders—Barboncito, Armijo, and finally in 1866 Manuelito—surrendered or were captured and made what is called the "Long Walk" to the Bosque Redondo reservation at Fort Sumner, New Mexico. Between 1000 and 2000 Navajo evaded capture and never surrendered, taking refuge in the Grand Canyon, Black Mesa, Navajo Mountain, Echo Cliffs, and along the Colorado: Hoskinini, Kayelli, Old Scarbreast (Spaneshank), Daghaa Sikaad, Blackhorse, Old Arrow, Peokon and Many Wishkers were their leaders.

One Navajo elder said of the Long Walk:

By slow stages we traveled eastward by present Gallup and Shush Bìtó, Bear Spring, which is now called Fort Wingate. You ask how they treated us? If there was room, the soldiers put the women and children on the wagons. Some even let them ride behind them on their horses. I have never been able to understand a people who killed you one day and on the next played with your children ...

== See also ==
- Apache Wars
- Arizona Territory
- Navajo Scouts

== Notes ==
=== References ===
- Forbes, Jack D. (1960). Apache, Navaho and Spaniard. Norman, OK: University of Oklahoma Press. LCCCN 60-13480.
- Kelly, Lawrence. Navajo Roundup. Colorado: Pruett Pub. Co., 1970.
- Lavender, David. The Rockies, Revised Edition. New York: Harper & Row, 1975.
- Limerick, Patricia Nelson. The Legacy of Conquest: The Unbroken Past of the American West. New York: W. W. Norton, 1987.
- McNitt, Frank. Navajo Wars. University of New Mexico, 1972.
- Sides, Hampton, Blood and Thunder: An Epic of the American West, Doubleday (2006), hardcover, 462 pages, ISBN 0-385-50777-1 ISBN 978-0-385-50777-6
- Smith, Duane A. Rocky Mountain West: Colorado, Wyoming, & Montana, 1859–1915. Albuquerque: University of New Mexico Press, 1992.
- Thompson, Gerald (1976). The Army and the Navajo: The Bosque Redondo Reservation Experiment 1863–1868. Tucson, Arizona: The University of Arizona Press. ISBN 0-8165-0495-4.
- Williams, Albert N. Rocky Mountain Country. New York: Duell, Sloan & Pearce, 1950.
- Yenne, Bill. Indian Wars: The Campaign for the American West. Yardley: Westholme, 2005.
- Worecester, Donald. The Apaches: Eagles of the Southwest.
- Marco Aurilio: "La campagna militare di Kit Carson, l'ultima guerra dei Signori del Nuovo Messico". https://www.farwest.it/?p=30543
