= Chelly =

Chelly may refer to:

- Canyon de Chelly, a canyon in Arizona
  - Battle of Canyon de Chelly, a battle in the canyon
  - Canyon de Chelly National Monument, a U.S. National Monument
- A. H. Halsey (1923–2014), nicknamed Chelly, British sociologist
- Jacques E. Chelly, academic specializing in anesthesiology and acute pain management

== People ==
- Chelly (performer), American Actor and Musician from Never Have I Ever on Netflix

== See also ==
- Chelli (disambiguation)
