= Battle of Canyon de Chelly =

Part of the Navajo Wars (1864)

Coordinates: 36.1552818°N 109.5089952°W

- Part of the Navajo Wars, American Indian Wars
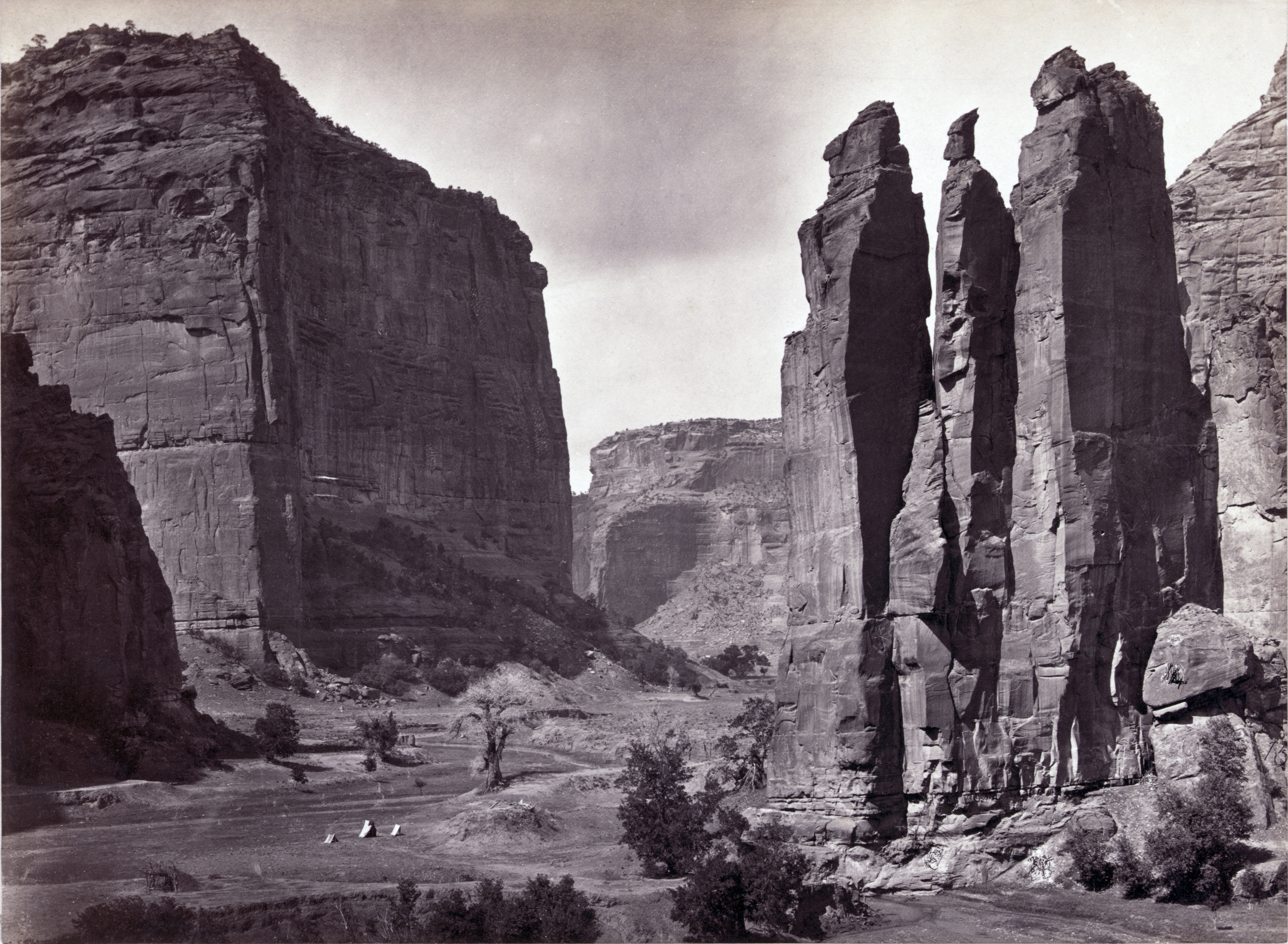
- Canyon de Chelly
Date	12–14 January 1864
Location	Canyon de Chelly, Arizona Territory; Present-day Canyon de Chelly National Monument, Arizona
Result	United States victory

Belligerents
United States	Navajo

Commanders and leaders
(United States) Kit Carson	Barboncito; Manuelito

Strength
389	~1,000–8,000

Casualties and losses
Unknown	23 killed 5 wounded 234 captured

The Battle of Canyon de Chelly was fought in 1864 as part of the Navajo Wars. It was a successful operation for the United States Army which precipitated the Long Walk and was the final major military engagement between the Navajo and the Americans. The battle ended with the fall of the main Navajo settlements of Canyon de Chelly in present-day northern Arizona.

== Background ==
By the time of the American Civil War the Navajo was the largest nation in the Southwest and one of the largest remaining Native American nations within the United States. Colonel Christopher H. "Kit" Carson had been waging a successful campaign against the Navajos employing a scorched earth policy, destroying homes, food and supplies. It was Carson's policy to capture the Navajo instead of killing them. However, by November 1863 Carson had only sent 200 people on to the reservation at Bosque Redondo. Brigadier General James H. Carleton ordered Carson into the Navajo stronghold in Canyon de Chelly. The canyon had been explored once before in 1858 by Colonel Dixon S. Miles. Miles had recommended no command should re-enter it.

The Navajo in Canyon de Chelly were members of the bands led by Manuelito, Barboncito and his brother Delgado. By the time Carson's men came into their lands, these Navajo groups had already suffered attacks from Ute warriors. The raids by the Utes and soldiers had taken its toll on some of the Navajos. Delgado's followers concluded they would not be able to survive the winter and surrendered at Fort Defiance. Barboncito vowed never to surrender and continued fighting the army.

== Battle ==
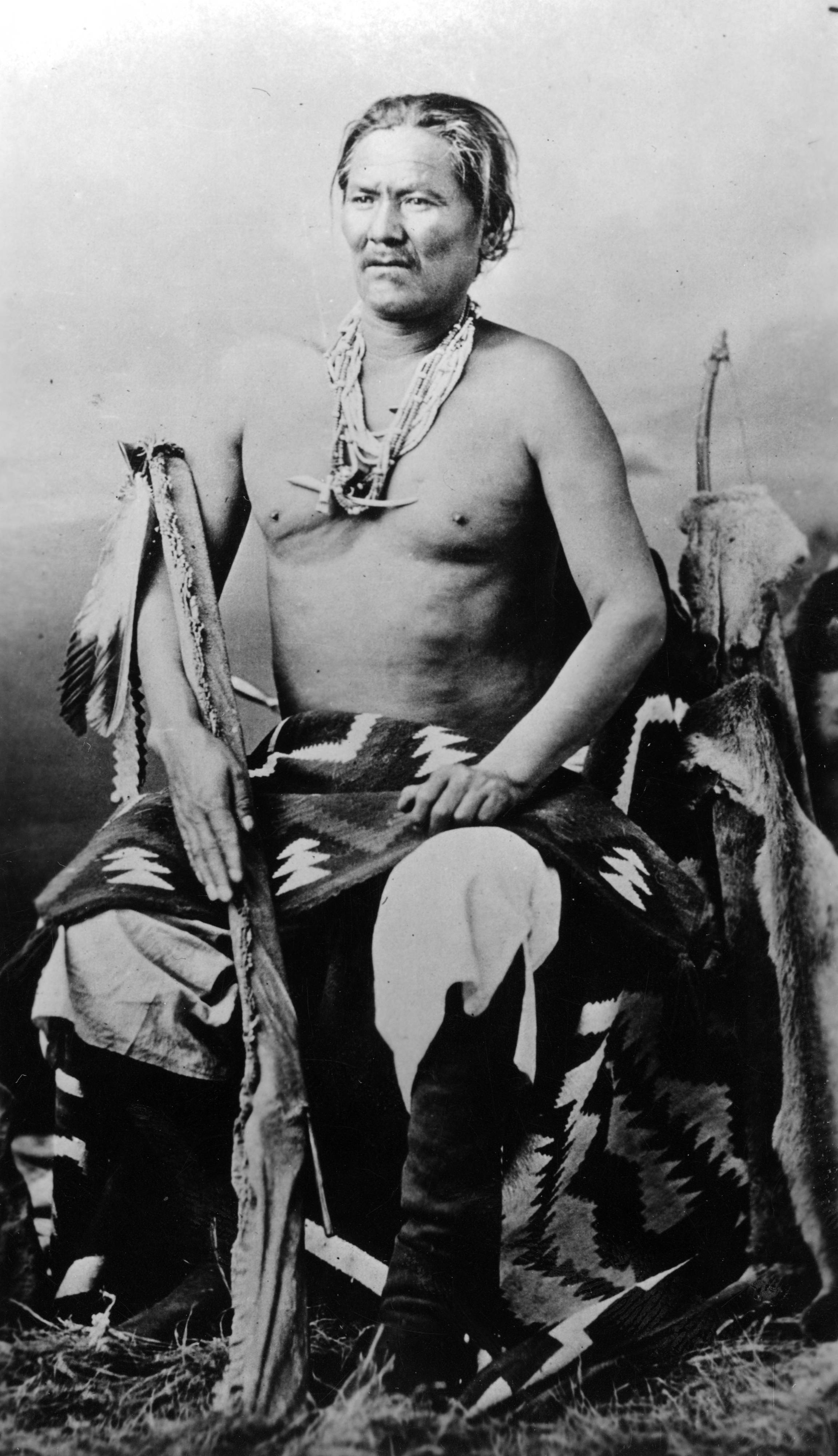
Chief Manuelito after the Navajo Wars.

When Carson was ready to move against Canyon de Chelly, Barboncito's men ran off all the army mules. Carson's men had to return to Fort Defiance and delay the attack. By 6 January, Carson was re-equipped and ready to move against Canyon de Chelly despite heavy snow.

Carson had with him 389 troopers from the 1st New Mexico Cavalry. He divided his command, sending Captain Albert H. Pfeiffer into the east end of the canyon with 100 men, while Carson led the remaining 289 to the west end of the canyon. Carson traversed the entire canyon, occasionally engaging in skirmishes and destroying every abandoned native camp he found until reaching the opposite end without encountering the main Navajo band or Captain Pfeiffer. Pfeiffer had missed the entrance to the canyon in a snowstorm and was instead traversing through a northern branch called Canyon del Muerto. Carson meanwhile retraced his route back to the west entrance and waited for Pfeiffer to arrive. Pfeiffer arrived having been harassed by natives along the cliffs but, like Carson, had only engaged in light skirmishing. The army set up camp near Chinle, Arizona.

Barboncito and Manuelito had both vowed not to surrender. The two led their followers to a rocky butte known as Fortress Rock, at the confluence of the two canyons. Here the Navajos had stockpiled food and were able to hold out against the army's incursions into the canyon. However, this isolated position left the Navajo without many necessities for the coming winter. Many decided to turn themselves in. In the meantime, Carson sent Captain Asa B. Carey through the canyon one last time before the entire command returned to Fort Canby.

== Aftermath ==
Although the battle itself had been somewhat anticlimactic, the operation as a whole proved to be a great success to the United States. The destruction of the Navajo camps, crops and supplies came at a crucial time for the Navajo. Cold, hungry and tired, many realized they would not be killed or captured by the soldiers if they came in peacefully. Delgado tried to convince others to surrender by reminding them of food, blankets and protection at the army forts. Manuelito was one of a few who never surrendered and fled into Hopi lands. By the summer of 1864 Carson had accepted the largest Native American surrender in history. Nearly 8,000 people had surrendered and were soon moved to the Bosque Redondo reservation. The deadly journey became known as the Long Walk of the Navajo.

In 1868, after four years of exile, the Navajo were allowed to return to their homeland. The site is operated by the National Park Service as the Canyon de Chelly National Monument. The Visitor Center is three miles from Route 191 in Chinle, Arizona.
