= Second Battle of Fort Defiance =

1860 Navajo Wars battle

Battle of Fort Defiance
- Part of the Navajo Wars
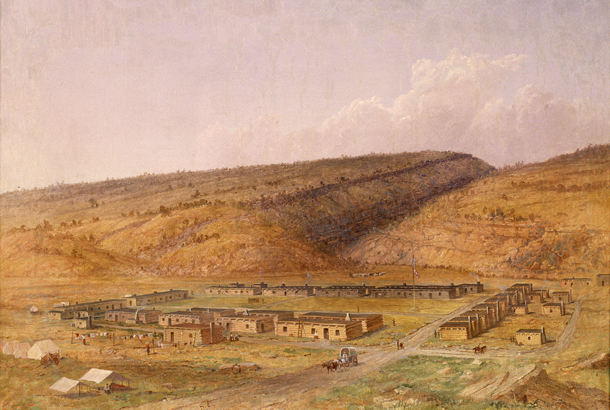
- Fort Defiance in 1873, by Seth Eastman.
| Date | April 29, 1860 |
| Location | Fort Defiance, New Mexico Territory; Modern Day: Fort Defiance, Arizona 35°44′49″N 109°04′07″W |
| Result | United States victory |

Belligerents
| United States of America | Navajo |

Commanders and leaders
| (United States) Oliver Shepherd | Manuelito; Barboncito |

Strength
| 150 infantry 1 fort | ~1,000 warriors |

Casualties and losses
| 4 killed 3 wounded | ~7 killed unknown wounded |

The Battle of Fort Defiance was a military engagement fought during the United States period of the Navajo Wars. On April 29, 1860, about 1,000 Navajo warriors assaulted the United States Army garrison of Fort Defiance in New Mexico Territory, now within present day Arizona. The Navajo achieved a surprise attack but was ultimately repulsed by 150 American defenders of the 3rd Infantry under Captain Oliver L. Shepherd. The Americans formed in the center of the buildings and withstood the Navajo attack. The natives retreated with a loss of around seven dead and several wounded while the Americans suffered four men killed in action and three wounded.

The second Navajo assault on Fort Defiance was the only instance of hostile natives attacking a heavily garrisoned fort subsequent to occupation during the Mexican–American War. It was one of the largest battles fought within the borders of Arizona. It was also one of the reasons why the militia commander Lieutenant Colonel Manuel Antonio Chaves ordered an unauthorized campaign into Navajo territory in 1860 and 1861.

== See also ==
- Apache Wars
- American Indian Wars
