= Chelliah =

Chelliah is a given name and a surname. Notable people with the name include:

- AR Chelliah, Indian religious leader, Bishop of Kanyakumari Diocese
- Devasahayam David Chelliah (1894–1979), JP OBE, the first Asian Archdeacon of Singapore
- Leaena Chelliah (born 1937), PBM BBM, founded Singapore's first school for children with multiple disabilities
- M. Chelliah, Indian politician and former Member of the Legislative Assembly
- Raja Chelliah (1922–2009), economist and founding chairman of the Madras School of Economics
- Shobhana Chelliah, Distinguished Professor of Linguistics, University of North Texas
- Chelliah Kumarasuriar, Sri Lankan politician
- Chelliah Loganathan (1913–1981), the first Ceylonese general manager of the Bank of Ceylon
- Chelliah Paramalingam (born 1936), Malaysian field hockey player
- Chelliah Thurairaja, USP, SLMC, Sri Lankan military physician, Army general, sportsman

== See also ==
- Chelia
- Chelli (disambiguation)
- Chilia (disambiguation)
- Shelia
