= Treaty of Bosque Redondo =

1868 US treaty ending the Navajo Wars

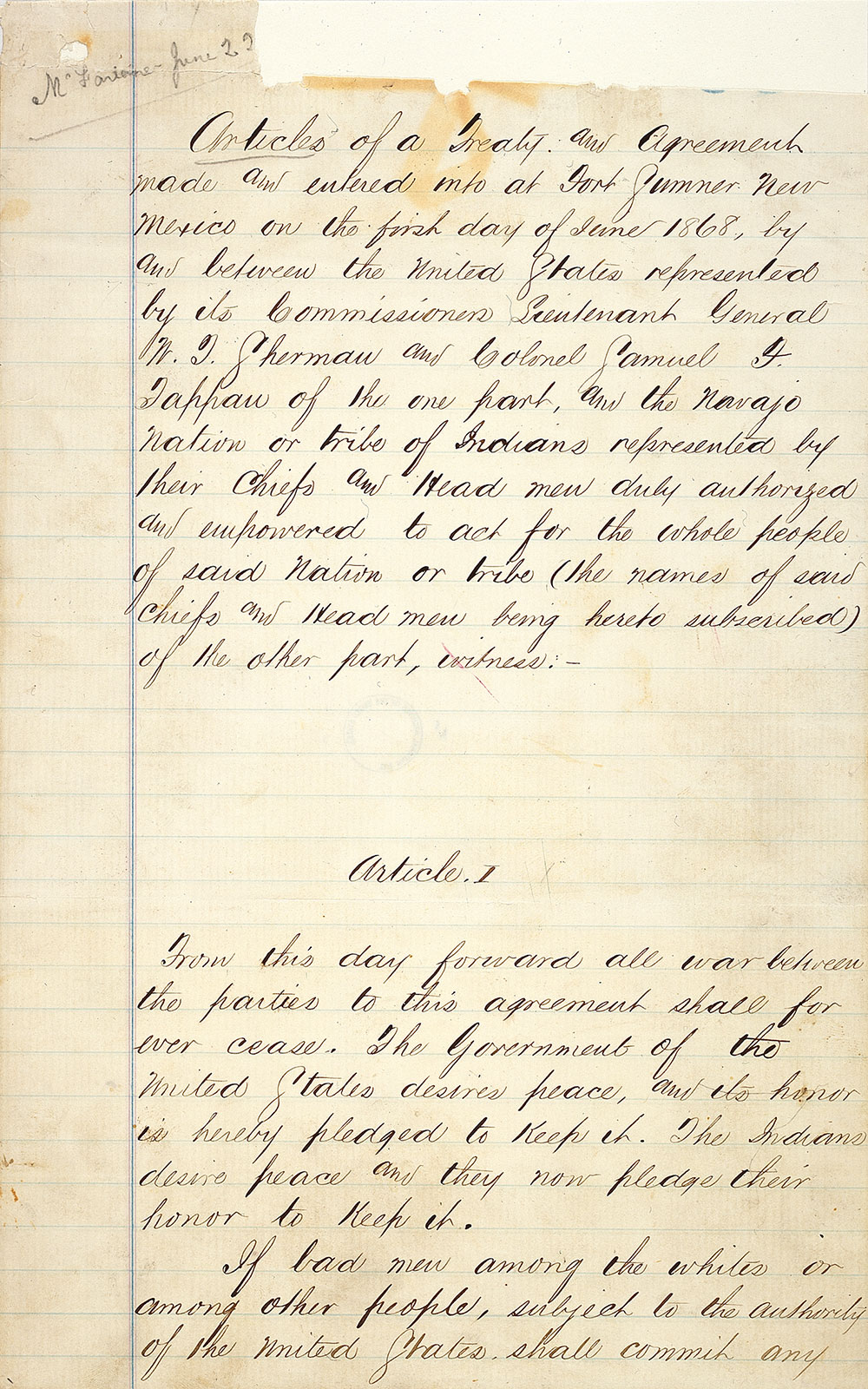
First page of the Treaty of Bosque Redondo

The Treaty of Bosque Redondo (Spanish for "Round Forest") also the Navajo Treaty of 1868 or Treaty of Fort Sumner, Navajo Naal Tsoos Sani or Naaltsoos Sání (Note: Literally, the old paper)) was an agreement between the Navajo and the US Federal Government signed on June 1, 1868. It ended the Navajo Wars and allowed for the return of those held in internment camps at Fort Sumner following the Long Walk of 1864. The treaty effectively established the Navajo as a sovereign nation.

== Background ==
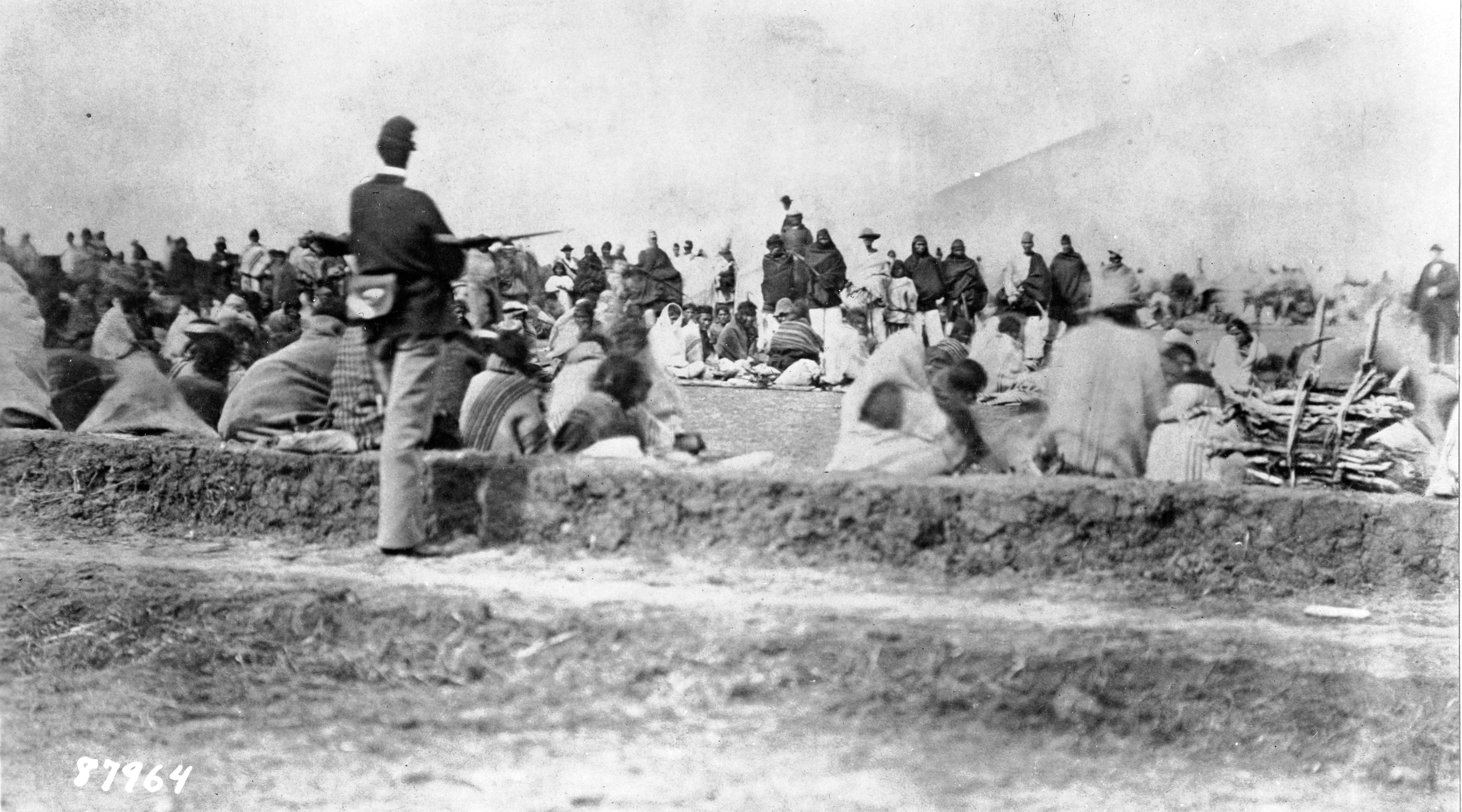
Navajo under guard at Bosque Redondo

Following conflicts between the Navajo and US forces, and scorched earth tactics employed by Kit Carson, which included the burning of tribal crops and livestock, James Henry Carleton issued an order in 1862 that all Navajo would relocate to the Bosque Redondo Reservation (Note: Hwéeldi in Navajo, literally the land of suffering) near Fort Sumner, in what was then the New Mexico Territory. Those who refused would face "immediate military action". This culminated in the Long Walk of 1864, wherein some 8,000 to 10,000 Navajo and Apache, including women and children, were forced to march over 350 miles from their native land near the Four Corners area.

According to Carleton's planned assimilation, while at Bosque Redondo the Navajo would "become farmers, would live in villages, and would be instructed in Christianity and other American practices". However the site, personally chosen by Carleton, proved difficult and expensive to maintain, and the conditions for those interned there deplorable. Farming was impractical in the poor quality soil, with inadequate irrigation, and the unpredictable and occasionally destructive waters of the Pecos River. What crops grew were destroyed by worms and floods. Many died of disease and starvation. According to one estimate, from March to December 1865, the total population dropped from approximately 9,000 to some 6,000.

Meanwhile, Bosque Redondo was incurring great expense to the government to maintain. In 1865 the cost of feeding and guarding the Navajo reached some $1,250,000. (Note: Congress had originally appropriated only $100,000 for the Navajo. Half of this initial funding was lost to corruption, and within four month's time, the military managed to spend $510,000 to sustain Bosque Redondo.) General William T. Sherman wrote to General James Carleton that the government "cannot and will not maintain" this "extravagant system of expendature," and joked to General John A. Rawlins, that they would be better off sending the Navajo to the "Fifth Avenue Hotel to board at the cost of the United States." By Sherman's own calculation, Bosque Redondo would cost the government some $2,002,277 between 1865 and 1868.

Issues of the camp and the fate of those interred there was debated in Congress, and the Doolittle Committee was formed, led by Chairman of the Committee on Indian Affairs James Rood Doolittle, in order to in part investigate the squalid conditions and provide recommendations to Congress. Eventually in 1867, Carleton was removed from command. The newly formed Indian Peace Commission, established to resolve the pressing issues of the western tribes, made their official report in January of the following year and recommended their course of action concerning the Navajo, that "a treaty be made with them, or their consent in some way [be] obtained, to remove at an early day to the southern district selected by us, where they may soon be made self- supporting."

After negotiating the Second Treaty of Fort Laramie, peace commissioners William Tecumseh Sherman along with Samuel F. Tappan departed to treat with the Navajo and bring an end to their current arrangement. There they met with Barboncito as tribal representative along with 10 headsmen.

== Negotiations ==
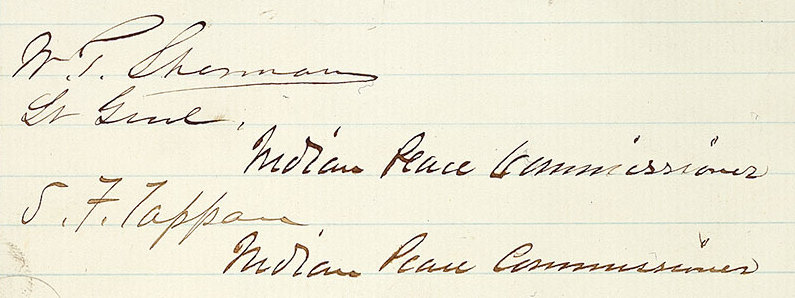
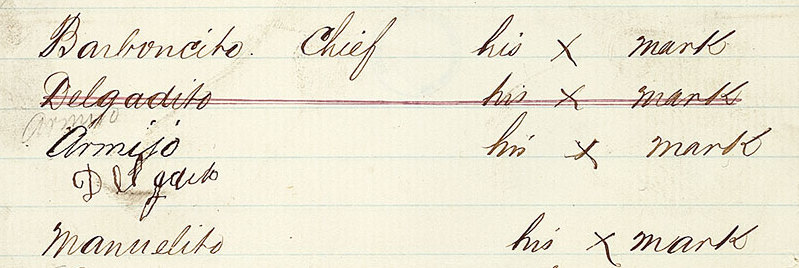
First signature page of the treaty, with those of Sherman and Tappan (top), and the opening signatures of the Navajo beginning with Barboncito

Sherman and Tappan arrived at Fort Sumner on May 28, 1868, with full authority granted by Congress earlier that year to negotiate a treaty. The conditions on the reservation "deeply impressed Sherman" and "appalled Tappan". Tappan likened the plight of the Navajo to that of prisoners of war during the Civil War, imprisoned at Andersonville, Georgia, where conditions deteriorated so dramatically nearly 13,000 had died there. In Sherman's words, "The Navajos had sunk into a condition of absolute poverty and despair."

Initially, Sherman proposed moving the Navajo to the Indian Territory, in what would become the US state of Oklahoma. He offered to send a delegation there at the government's expense. Barboncito refused, and the Navajo resolved that they would not plant again at Bosque Redondo. Barboncito recited his grievances, according to one source:

the crowding together and dying of his people and their stock, their toil in vain, the cursed ground and the shame of going to the commissary for food, the grubbing of mesquite roots for fuel and carrying them on one's back for miles and miles, the Comanches' murderous raids." (Note: In reference to fuel, the land at Bosque Redondo had a notable shortage of available wood, according to the same source, which described the location as "an early treeless tract of sandy, gramagrass prairie". For his part, Sherman described it as "a mere spot of green grass in the midst of a wild desert.")

The Indian Bureau agent impressed upon the commissioners, that the Navajo were resolute that they should not remain at Bosque Redondo, and although they had remained peaceable thus far, "if not permitted to return to their own country, would leave anyway, committing depredations as they went." Sherman telegraphed to Senator John B. Henderson, who had assumed the chair of the Indian Affairs Committee, advising him that "the Navajos were unalterably opposed to any resettlement in Texas, or any place further east, and would not remain at the Bosque Redondo without the use of overwhelming military force."

Tappan had been in favor of a return to their homeland from the outset, and Sherman relented, convinced that the land was unfit for white settlement, and that he had failed in his efforts to divert the Navajo elsewhere. What was left was to define the area to which they would return, and negotiations (through the double language barrier of translation from English to Spanish, and then from Spanish to Navajo) were not well understood. He agreed they could go outside the reservation to hunt and trade, but must make their homes and farms within its bounds, the area of which he overestimated by nearly double. A dozen miles south of the proposed reservation lay the surveyed route for planned rail construction along the 35th parallel, land which had been promised to the railroad for forty miles on either side.

=== Signing ===
Ultimately, regardless of what may have been put down on the "white man's document", the Navajo thought "only of going home". In total, 29 would make their mark, and the treaty was signed on June 1, 1868. It was ratified by the senate on June 24, 1868, and signed by President Andrew Johnson on August 12.

== Provisions ==
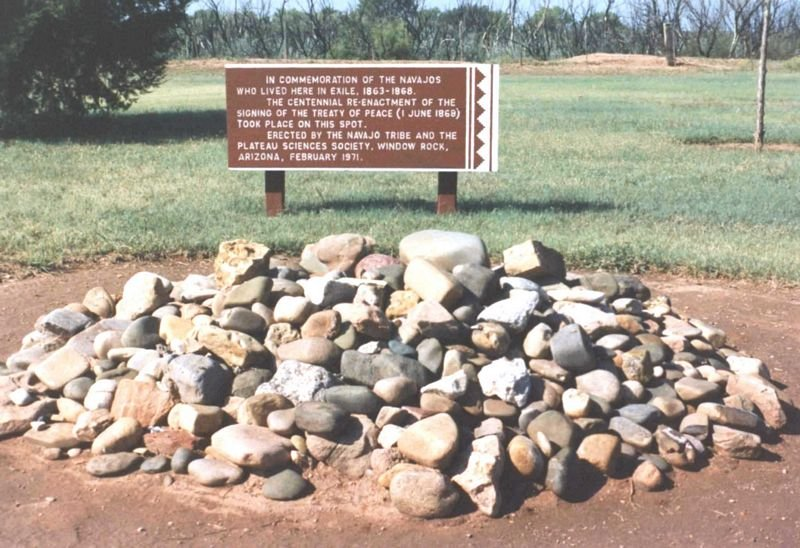
Marker where the signing of the treaty took place

The treaty was divided into 13 articles. Much of the substance was modeled after the Treaty of Fort Laramie crafted for the Sioux earlier that year, and similar to many other such treaties, Bosque Redondo included a number of so-called civilization or assimilation provisions, designed to incentivize a transition to a landed agricultural existence. Provisions of the treaty included the following:

- The Navajo would stop all raiding, remain on the reservation in Arizona and New Mexico, and relinquish claims to land outside the reservation. The established reservation consisted of 3,500,000 acres (1,400,000 ha) on the border between New Mexico and Arizona, but excluded some of the best land for farming and grazing.
- The government would supply the Navajo with equipment for farming and seeds for planting. Each family would be allotted 160 acres (65 ha) of land. In all, the government agreed to provide 15,000 sheep and goats, and 500 head of cattle.
- The government agreed to pay $10 annually for 10 years to families engaged in "farming or mechanical pursuits" to be used by the commissioner Indian Affairs to purchase necessities. Those who did not farm would receive $5 payments.
- For ten years the government would provide supplies for the reservation. These were to be provided in the value of $100 for the first year, and $25 annually for the two years thereafter.
- The Navajo agreed to send their children aged six to 13 to attend school for a period of ten years, while the government agreed to provide one teacher per 30 students.
- Those among the tribe who committed crimes would be subject to federal, rather than tribal law.
- The Navajo agreed not to interfere with railroad construction, or to harm any wagon trains or cattle.

In more specifics, each of the thirteen articles can be summarized by excerpts from their primary document as follows:

- Article 1. "From this day forward all war between the parties to this agreement shall forever cease"
- Article 2. "The United States agrees that the following disctric of country, to wit: bounded on the north by the 37th degree of north latitude, south by an east and west line passing through the site of old Fort Defiance, in Cañon Bonito, east by the parallel of longitude which, if prolonged south would pass through old Fort Lyon, or the Ojo-de-oso, Bear Spring, and west by a parallel of longitude about 109˚ 30' west of Greenwich, provided it embraces the outlet of the Cañon-de-Chilly, which cañon is to be all included in this reservation, shall be, and is the same hereby, set apart for the use and occupation of the Navajo tribe of Indians, and for such other friendly tribes or individual Indians from time to time they may be willing, with the consent of the United States to admit among them; and the United States agrees that no persons except those herein so authorized to do, and except such officers, soldiers, agents, and employés of the Government, or of the Indians as may be authorized to enter upon Indian reservations in discharge of duties imposed by law, or the orders of the President, shall ever be permitted to pass over, settle upon, or reside in, the territory described in this article."
- Article 3. "The United States agrees to cause to be built, at some point within said reservation, where timber and water may be convenient, the following buildings: a warehouse ...; an agency building...; a carpenter shop and blacksmith shop...; and a schoolhouse and chapel."
- Article 4. "The United States agrees that the agent for the Navajos shall make his home the agency building."
- Article 5. "If any individual belonging to said tribe, or legally incorporated with it, being the head of a family, shall desire to commence farming, he shall have the privilege to select, in the presence and with the assistance of the agent then in charge, a tract of land within said reservation..."
- Article 6. "In order to insure the civilization of the Indians entering into this treaty, the necessity of education is admitted... they pledge themselves to compel their children, male and female, between the ages of six and sixteen years, to attend school..."
- Article 7. "When the head of a family shall have selected lands and received his certificate as above directed, and the agent shall be satisfied, ..., he shall be entitled to receive seeds and agricultural implements..."
- Article 8. "In lieu of all sums of money or other annuities provided to be paid to the Indians herein named under any treaty or treaties heretofore made, the United States agrees to deliver at the agency house on the reservation herein named, on the first day of September of each year for ten years..."
- Article 9. "In consideration of the advantages and benefits conferred by this treaty, and the many pledges of friendship by the United States, the tribes who are parties to this agreement hereby stipulate that they will relinquish all right to occupy any territory outside their reservation, as herein defined..."
- Article 10. "No future treaty for the cession of any portion or part of the reservation herein described, which may be held in common, shall be of any validity or force against said Indians unless agreed to and executed by at least three-fourths of all the adult male Indians occupying or interested in the same..."
- Article 11. "The Navajos also hereby agree that any time after the signing of these presents they will proceed in such manner as may be required of them by the agent..."
- Article 12. "It is further agreed by and between the parties to this agreement that the sum of one hundred and fifty thousand dollars appropriated or to be appropriated shall be disbursed as follows...:

"The actual cost of removal of the tribe...", "The purchase of fifteen thousand sheep and goats...", "The purchase of five hundred beef cattle and a million pounds of corn...", "The balance, if any, of the appropriation to be invested for the maintenance of the Indians", "The removal of this tribe to be made under the supreme control and direction of the military commander of the Territory of New Mexico"

- Article 13. "The tribe herein named, by their representatives, parties to this treaty, agree to make the reservation herein described their permanent home..."

== Aftermath and legacy ==
Map showing the extent of the land agreed to in 1868, and subsequent additions to the Navajo reservation, with the Four Corners in the upper right, where the 1868 and 1905 sections meet

The signing of the treaty, as a treaty, and so defined by the US government as "an agreement between two nations", effectively established the sovereignty of the Navajo Nation, although still dependent on the federal government. (Note: See also Tribal sovereignty in the United States) However, according to historian Jennifer Nez Denetdale, the treaty was also "the point at which the Navajo people lost their freedom and autonomy, and came under American colonial rule." Denetale continues:

In affixing their X-marks to paper, Diné [Navajo] leader both affirmed Diné sovereignty and acknowledged the authority of the United States to limit tribal sovereignty. They did what they had to do in an impossible situation to allow their people to have a future.

In their "Long Walk Home", the Navajo became a rare example in US history of native people successfully returning to their ancestral lands after being forcibly removed. Although in some respects the treaty meant that Carleton's Bosque Redondo experiment ended in failure, it succeeded in ending the Navajo wars, nullifying the independence of the Navajo, and rendering them "wards of the government".

On June 18, 1868, the group of 8,000, accompanied by some 2,000 sheep and 1,000 horses set off at a pace of 12 miles (19 km) per day. The group arrived too late in the year to their homeland for the planting season, and were "forced to rely on rations, wild foods" and those Navajo who had avoided the long captivity at Bosque Redondo and had maintained their herds. The people would continue to struggle against their poverty for several years.

The land the newly established Navajo reservation was between 10% and 25% the size of their original lands, and did not include much of the best grazing land, much of which had been occupied by white settlers during the Navajo's internment at Bosque Redondo. The boundaries of the reservation remained nebulous, with as many as half living off the reservation by 1869, and even the army officers in the area were themselves unsure where the limits of the Navajo land may have been. This proved advantageous for both parties. First for the Navajo, who enjoyed the greater freedom of movement allowed by lax enforcement, and also for the government, who could then claim the Navajo failed to respect their agreement, and abrogate their own obligations, saving tens of millions of dollars in subsidies.

Of the benefits the government agreed to provide to the Navajo, none ever fully materialized.

=== Commemoration ===
June 1, 1868 is remembered among the Navajo as Treaty Day, and has since been commemorated, including on June 1, 1999, when thousands gathered at a ceremony held at Northern Arizona University. In May 2018, one of two surviving original copies of the treaty was moved to the Navajo Nation Museum, for display as part of the 150th anniversary of the signing. Ceremonies commemorating the 150th anniversary were also held at the Bosque Redondo Memorial, established in 2005, which includes a museum where the second surviving copy was displayed.

== See also ==
- Indian Appropriations Act – Legislation passed by the US government related to tribal lands
- List of United States treaties – Articles on treaties to which the US was a party
- Medicine Lodge Treaty – Negotiated by the Peace Commission with southern Plains Indian tribes in 1867
