= Cassandra Manuelito-Kerkvliet =

American academic administrator

President of Antioch University Seattle
- In office July 2007 – June 30, 2013
- Succeeded by: Brian Baird

President of Diné College
- In office August 1, 2000 – 2003
- Preceded by: Tommy Lewis
- Succeeded by: Ferlin Clark

Personal details
- Born: May 14, 1954 (age 72) Laramie, Wyoming, U.S.
- Relations: Manuelito (great-great grandfather)
- Children: 3
- Education: University of Wyoming (B.A., M.S.); University of Oregon (Ph.D.)
- Occupation: Academic administrator

Cassandra Manuelito-Kerkvliet (born May 14, 1954) is an American academic administrator. She was the president of Antioch University Seattle from 2007 to 2013—the first Native American woman to serve as president of an accredited university outside of the Tribal College and University System. She was formerly the president of Diné College from 2000 to 2003.

== Early life and education ==
Manuelito-Kerkvliet was born on May 14, 1954, in Laramie, Wyoming. Her Navajo family is from Tohatchi and Naschitti, New Mexico. She has three sisters and a brother. Her parents moved to Wyoming as part of the Indian Relocation Act of 1956 to work for the Union Pacific Railroad. Manuelito-Kerkvliet was born into the Towering House clan, born for the Salt clan while her maternal and paternal grandfathers were in the Mud and Weaver clans respectively. She is the great-great-granddaughter of Navajo Chief Manuelito.

Manuelito-Kerkvliet experienced racism and a "redneck mentality" growing up in a predominately white community in the 1960s. She completed a B.A. in social work in 1976 and a M.S. in counselor education in 1988 from the University of Wyoming. She earned a Ph.D. in educational policy and management from the University of Oregon in 2005. Her dissertation was titled: "Widening the Circle: Mentoring and the Learning Process for American Indian Women in Tribal College Administration." Paul Goldman and Diane M. Dunlap served as co-chairs of her dissertation committee. Phyllis Lee served as a mentor and coach during the final phase of her doctoral studies.

== Career ==
Manuelito-Kerkvliet's areas of interest include minority women in higher education administration, American Indian higher education, promoting gender equity, and leadership development.

She worked in student services and counseling at the University of Oregon, the University of Wyoming, New Mexico State University, and the University of New Mexico. From 1990 to 1995, she was the coordinator of the Indian Education Office at Oregon State University (OSU). In March 1992 she worked in the OSU Multicultural Affairs Office. By 1993, she had assisted Native American students earning degrees at OSU for six years. She shared her experience as the only Native American woman her age at OSU's campus, stating "being Navajo and very traditional, I get lonely." In 1993, only 150 out of 2,284 faculty members were black, American Indian, Asian, or Hispanic. Manuelito-Kerkvliet reported similar concerns in 1995 when she was the coordinator of the OSU Indian Education Office. She worked for 16 years with Native American students at Oregon State University and University of Oregon. At Oregon State University, she founded and directed the Indian Education Office. She became president of Diné College on August 1, 2000. She spent half of February 2001 in Washington, D.C., meeting with congressional leaders and presidents of other tribal colleges in the American Indian Higher Education Consortium. On April 1, 2003, R. C. Gorman donated his personal library to Diné College at Manuelito-Kerkvliet's request. She left Diné College in 2003. In April 2006, Manuelito-Kerkvliet was selected as president of the Institute of American Indian Arts (IAIA). She was set to succeed Della Warrior on July 1, 2006, but in June 2006, she declined the job with the IAIA without elaborating on her decision. She became president of Antioch University Seattle in July 2007. Her last day was June 30, 2013.

Manuelito-Kerkvliet was the first Native American woman to serve as president of an accredited university that was not a tribal college or university.

== Personal life ==
Manuelito-Kerkvliet is married and has three sons. She enjoys outdoor activities including backpacking, camping, fly fishing, and whitewater rafting. She also knits and is a participant in book clubs. As of November 2020, Manuelito-Kerkvliet resides in Corvallis, Oregon.

During the COVID-19 pandemic on the Navajo Nation, she sewed an estimated 5,000 face masks through the program she named Nizhoni which is Navajo for "beautiful...in a surface way. It means more of a balanced life."
