= 1st Regiment New Mexico Volunteer Cavalry =

- Flag of the United States, 1865-1867
- Active: May 31, 1862-September 30, 1866
- Country: United States of America
- Allegiance: Union
- Branch: United States Army Cavalry
- Engagements: Battle of Canyon de Chelly; Battle of Adobe Fort

The 1st Regiment New Mexico Cavalry was a volunteer cavalry regiment in the Union Army during the American Civil War.

== Service ==
=== Civil War ===
In August 1861, Ceran St. Vrain and Kit Carson organized the 1st New Mexico Volunteer Infantry Regiment. This regiment fought at the battle of Valverde. On March 31, 1862, the 1st, 2nd, 4th, and 5th New Mexico Infantry Regiments were consolidated to form the 1st New Mexico Volunteer Cavalry Regiment with Kit Carson as colonel. The regiment was dispersed throughout the Department of New Mexico stationed at various frontier forts: Stanton, Goodwin, McRae, Wingate, Craig, Canby, Sumner, Marcy, Bascom, Union, and other points in that department, during entire term of service.

In January 1864 Kit Carson led a detachment of nearly 400 in the battle of Canyon de Chelly. Later that year Carson led a detachment at the first Battle of Adobe Walls. The regiment was mustered out on September 30, 1866. However the 1st Battalion Cavalry and Infantry was organized from it August 31, 1866. It continued on duty in the Department of New Mexico and Arizona until mustered out November 23, 1867.

=== Spanish–American War ===
With the declaration of war with Spain in April 1898 the 1st New Mexico Cavalry entered Federal service as the 2d Squadron, 1st U.S. Volunteer Cavalry, better known as the "Rough Riders." Theodore Roosevelt conceived the idea of raising a cavalry regiment recruited from businessmen, cowboys and outdoorsmen. Roosevelt, a former New York National Guardsman, helped to organize the regiment and was appointed its lieutenant colonel. After training in Texas and Florida, the Rough Riders landed in Cuba, without their horses, on June 22, 1898. It was during the Battle of San Juan Hill, on July 1, that the Rough Riders, under the command of Lt Col Roosevelt, made their mark in American military history. Ordered to seize Kettle Hill in support of the main attack, the Rough Riders fought their way to the top despite heavy enemy fire. New Mexico's E and G Troops were among the first to reach the top of Kettle Hill. After taking the hill, the Rough Riders continued their attack, seizing the heights overlooking the city of Santiago. The American victory led to the Spanish surrender two weeks later.

=== 21st Century ===
The heritage of the 2nd Squadron, 1st U.S. Volunteer Cavalry, is perpetuated by the 200th Air Defense Artillery, New Mexico Army National Guard.http://www.ng.mil/resources/photo_gallery/heritage/roughriders.html

== Colonels ==
- Colonel Christopher H. Carson (31 Mar 1862-8 Oct 1866)
- Lt. Col. Theodore Roosevelt (October 27, 1898 – January 6, 1919)

== See also ==
- List of New Mexico Territory Civil War units
- Independent Companies, New Mexico Volunteer Militia Infantry
