= Kilia =

Kilia may refer to:

- Kiliia, a town in Odesa Oblast of Ukraine
  - Kiliia Raion, a former administrative region in Odesa Oblast
- Chilia Veche, a town in Tulcea County, Romania
- Chilia branch, a distributary of the Danube
- 470 Kilia, an asteroid
- Kilia, an English transliteration of Χηλή, the Greek name for the town of Şile in Turkey

== See also ==
- Chilia (disambiguation)
