= Chilia River =

Chilia River may refer to the following rivers in Romania:

- Chilia River (Bistrița), a tributary of the Bistriţa River
- Chilia River (Nemțișor), a tributary of the Nemțișor River

== See also ==
- Chilia branch, a distributary of the Danube
- Chilia (disambiguation)
