= Chilia =

Chilia may refer to:

Places:

- Kiliia (spelled Chilia Nouă, "New Chilia", in Romanian), a town in Ukraine
- Chilia Veche ("Old Chilia"), a commune in Tulcea County, Romania
- Chilia, a village in Bârgăuani Commune, Neamț County, Romania
- Chilia, a village in Făgețelu Commune, Olt County, Romania
- Chilia, a village in Homoroade Commune, Satu Mare County, Romania
- Chilia River (disambiguation), two Romanian rivers
- Chilia branch, a distributary of the Danube

Other uses:

- Chilia, the genus of the crag chilia, a South American bird

== See also ==
- Chillia District, Peru
- Kilia (disambiguation)
