= Jennifer Nez Denetdale =

Navajo history professor and author from New Mexico, U.S.

Jennifer Denetdale
- Born: United States
- Citizenship: Navajo Nation and U.S.
- Education: Northern Arizona University (PhD)
- Occupations: Professor of American studies, University of New Mexico
- Relatives: 3rd great grandparents, Manuelito and Juanita
- Writing career
- Language: English, Navajo
- Years active: 2011-present
- Website: americanstudies.unm.edu/about-us/people/faculty-profiles/jennifer-nez-denetdale.html

Jennifer Nez Denetdale is a professor of American studies at the University of New Mexico, where she teaches courses in Native American studies with an emphasis on race, class, and gender. She is the director of the University of New Mexico's Institute for American Research. She also specializes in Navajo history and culture and the effects of colonization and decolonization as it has impacted the Navajo people. She is the chair of the Navajo Nation Human Rights Commission. Denetdale is also an advocate for students who wish to pursue an education in Indigenous studies, Navajo women, and LGBT people.

== Early life ==
Denetdale's parents had both attended Stewart Indian School, a boarding school in Carson City, Nevada. Denetdale was raised in Tohatchi, New Mexico from childhood with her three sisters and one brother. She is a citizen of the Navajo Nation, and she is the Zia (or Weaver) clan and born for the Salt People Clan. Her maternal grandfathers are of the Red House clan and her paternal grandfathers are of the Water-Running-Together Clan.

== Mentors ==
Denetdale cites her former professor Luci Tapahonso (Diné) and Louis Owens as her early mentors in her pursuit of higher education.

== Education ==
Denetdale earned her MA in English and PhD in history from Northern Arizona University (NAU). Denetdale is the first person of Diné / Navajo descent to earn a PhD in History.

== Career ==
Denetdale is a full professor and chair of American studies at the University of New Mexico, where she teaches courses in Native American studies with an emphasis on critical Indigenous studies, Diné (Navajo) studies, Indigenous feminism, Gender Studies, decolonization and settler colonialism. She is the director of the University of New Mexico's Institute for American Research. She also specializes in Navajo history and culture and the effects of colonization and decolonization as it has impacted the Navajo people. She is the chair of the Navajo Nation Human Rights Commission. Denetdale is also an advocate for students who wish to pursue an education in Indigenous studies, Navajo women, and LGBT people.

Her book Reclaiming Diné History: The Legacies of Navajo Chief Manuelito and Juanita, published by the University of Arizona Press has been widely reviewed.

== Books, essays, exhibits, and lectures ==
- Indigenous Leadership and Gender in the 21st Century
- The Long Walk: The Forced Navajo Exile
- Nation to Nation: 09 Bad Acts / Bad Paper - Jennifer Nez Denetdale
- Reclaiming Navajo History
- Reclaiming Diné History The Legacies of Navajo Chief Manuelito and Juanita
- Nothing Left for Me: Federal Policy and the Photography of Milton Snow in Diné Bikéyah

== Awards and recognition ==
- Rainbow Naatsilid True Colors award
- UNM Faculty of Color Award
- UNM Sarah Brown Belle award (2013)
- Excellence in Diné Studies (2015)
- UNM Presidential Award of Distinction (2017)

In 2015, Denetdale was chosen to deliver an inaugural address for the 23rd Navajo Nation Council.
