= Făgețelu =

- Commune
- Seal

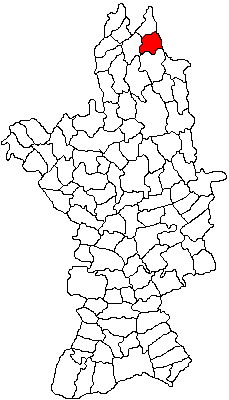
- Location in Olt County

- Location in Romania
- Coordinates: 44°47′N 24°32′E
- Country: Romania
- County: Olt
- Population (2021-12-01): 1,064
- Time zone: UTC+02:00 (EET)
  - Summer (DST): UTC+03:00 (EEST)
- Vehicle reg.: OT

Făgețelu is a commune in Olt County, Muntenia, Romania. It is composed of six villages: Bâgești, Chilia, Făgețelu, Gruiu, Isaci and Pielcani.
