= Barboncito =

Navajo leader (1820–1871)

- Hastiin Dághaaʼ
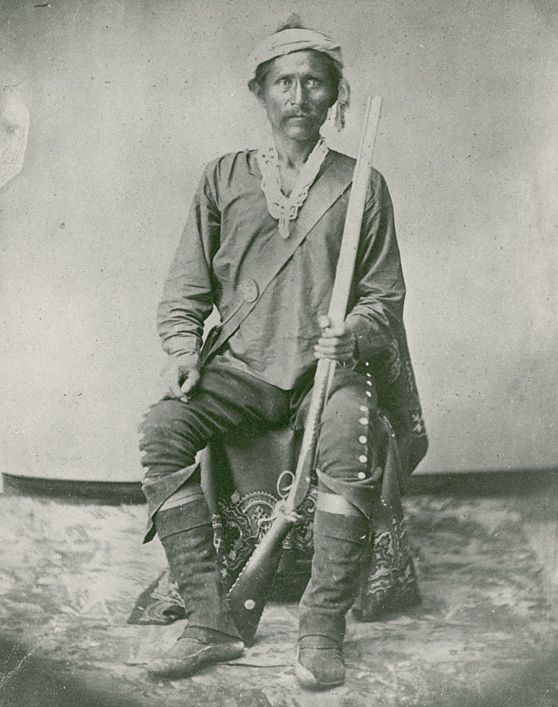
- Barboncito, c. 1865

Navajo leader

Personal details
- Born: c. 1820 Cañon de Chelly, Northeastern Arizona
- Died: 1871 Cañon de Chelly, Arizona
- Children: 1
- Known for: Navajo leader

Military service
- Battles/wars: Americans and New Mexico Raiders/Mexicans

Barboncito or Hastiin Dághaaʼ (ca. 1820–1871) was a Navajo political and spiritual leader.

== Background ==
His name means "little bearded one" in Spanish (barbón = bearded and -cito = diminutive). He also was known as Hástiin Dághá ("Man with the Whiskers"), Hastiin Daagi, Bistłahałání ("The Orator"), and Hózhǫ́ǫ́jí Naatʼááh ("Blessing Speaker"). Barboncito was born into the Ma'íí deeshgíízhiníí (Coyote Pass People) clan at Cañon de Chelly in 1820 and was a brother to Delgadito.

== Political career ==
He was a signatory of several treaties between the United States and Navajos, including the Doniphan Treaty of 1846 (Also known as the Bear Springs Treaty), which was an attempt to establish peace between the Navajo and Americans during the Mexican War. This treaty proved to be unsuccessful, as not all of the Navajo leaders signed it. This would later lead to armed rebellion against the United States where Barboncito worked together with another Navajo, Manuelito, in order to try and stop the forced relocation of Navajo tribe members to Bosque Redondo. Barboncito was the Head Chief of the Navajo when the Bosque Redondo Treaty of 1868 was signed. This treaty contained articles which would end hostilities between the United States and the Navajo people, as well as allowing them to return to their ancestral land at Cañon de Chelly in Arizona and having a reservation established there. The impact of this aspect of the treaty was the end of the Long Walk of the Navajo which had claimed the lives of thousands of Navajo people. Of all the Navajos of his time, Barboncito is probably most responsible for the long-term success of the Navajo culture and relations with non-Navajos. As well as being established as a skillful negotiator and leader of the Navajo people. Shortly after the enactment of the Bosque Redando Treaty, Barboncito died in 1871 at Cañon de Chelly.

Barboncito was also known as “The Orator” and “Blessing Speaker”, and did not participate in skirmishes amongst the Navajo and White people. In the 1850s, Barboncito was considered a mediator between the two conflicting groups, and proposed peace between them in order to prevent escalating warfare. Despite this, problems reigned on between the White people and the Navajo people. Navajos and whites fought over the grazing lands of Canyon Bonito near Fort Defiance, located in what is now the eastern part of the state of Arizona. The Navajos had let their horses graze in these pastures for centuries, but the newcomers also wanted the lands for their horses. In 1860, U.S. soldiers slaughtered a number of Navajo horses, leading the Navajos to raid army herds in order to replenish their losses. The White attack on Navajo horses forced Barboncito to take action. Barboncito led one-thousand men to Fort Defiance. Barboncito’s great efforts nearly won the Navajo the fort, but he and his team of warriors were driven off by the US Army into the Chuska Mountains, but there the United States’ forces could not withstand the Navajo hit-and-run attacks.

Stalemated, American Indians and whites sat down at a peace council once again. Barboncito, Manuelito, Delgadito, Armijo, Herrero Grande, and 17 other chiefs met Colonel Edward R. S. Canby at Fort Fauntleroy, 35 miles south of Fort Defiance. They all agreed to the terms of a treaty in 1861. For a time, the Navajos and the whites tried to forge the bonds of friendship. Despite the treaty, an undercurrent of distrust caused conflict between the two groups to continue.

The United States led an extensive campaign to "burn-and-imprison" the Navajos, administered by Colonel Christopher "Kit" Carson and Ute mercenaries, historic enemies of the Navajos. Barboncito made peaceful overtures to General James H. Carleton, Carson's commanding officer, in 1862, but the assault against the Navajo people dragged on.

Carson destroyed fields, orchards, and hogans—an earth-covered Navajo dwelling—and he confiscated cattle from the Continental Divide to the Colorado River. Though only 78 of the 12,000 Navajo people were killed, Carson's efforts crushed the Navajo spirit. By 1864, he had devastated Cañon de Chelly, hacking down thousands of peach trees and obliterating acres of corn fields. Eventually, a shortage of food and supplies forced the Navajos to surrender their sacred stronghold.

In 1864 Barboncito was captured in his hometown of Cañon de Chelly by troops under the command of Colonel Christopher “Kit” Carson. After experiencing the terrible conditions under Colonel Christopher “Kit” Carson, Barboncito escaped with about 500 followers in June 1865.

That same year, the "Long Walk" began, in which 8,000 Navajo people — two-thirds of the entire tribe — were escorted by 2,400 soldiers across 300 miles to Bosque Redondo, New Mexico. Almost 200 of the Indians died en route. The remaining 4,000 Navajos escaped west with Manuelito, who eventually surrendered in 1866 (two months before Barboncito). Barboncito was the last Navajo leader to be captured and led to Bosque Redondo. Once he found conditions there worse than imagined, he escaped and returned to Cañon de Chelly, but he was recaptured.

In 1868, Barboncito, Manuelito, and a delegation of chiefs traveled to Washington, D.C., after General Carleton had been transferred from Fort Sumner at Bosque Redondo and could no longer inflict his policies on the Navajo. Barboncito was granted great status by the whites—more authority than would have been accorded him by tribal custom. He played a leading role in negotiations with General William T. Sherman and Colonel Samuel F. Tappan, telling them that the creator of the Navajo people had warned the tribe never to go east of the Rio Grande River.

However, the US government was not inclined to return all their land to the Navajos. Sherman provided Barboncito and the other chiefs with three choices: go east to Indian Territory, relocate in New Mexico and be governed by the laws of that territory, or return to a diminished portion of their original lands. The Navajos chose the last option. On June 1, 1868, the Navajo leaders, including Barboncito, signed the Treaty of Bosque Redondo with the U.S. government. As reprinted in Wilcombe Washburn's American Indian and the United States: A Documentary History, the agreement begins: "From this day forward all war between the parties to this agreement shall forever cease." He is thought to have been buried with a handwritten copy of the treaty.

== Death and legacy ==
Barboncito was a gifted negotiator, as well as talented ceremonial singer. Shortly after the Bosque Redondo treaty was enacted, Barboncito died in 1871, at the age of 50 in his home village at Cañon de Chelly.
