= Chelli =

Chelli may refer to:

== People ==
=== Surname ===
- Alida Chelli (1943–2012), Italian actress;
- Zak Chelli (born 1997), English professional boxer

=== Given name ===
- Chelli Goldenberg (1954-), Israeli actress.

== See also ==
- Chelly (disambiguation)
