= Jacques E. Chelly =

American physician

Jacques E. Chelly is an academic specializing in anesthesiology and acute pain management. He is currently a professor at the University of Pittsburgh with dual appointments in the Department of Anesthesiology and Department of Orthopaedic Surgery. He is also Director of the Division known as the Acute Interventional Perioperative Pain Service (AIPPS) at the University of Pittsburgh Medical Center (UPMC). Chelly has authored over 150 publications since 1979, and continues to be one of the leading investigators in anesthesiology research. He is currently the Vice Chair of Clinical Research at the UPMC.

== Early life ==
Chelly was born is Paris, France. He attended the Hôpital Necker-Enfants malades, where he was awarded his MD.
