= Ferlin Clark =

Native American academic administrator and educator

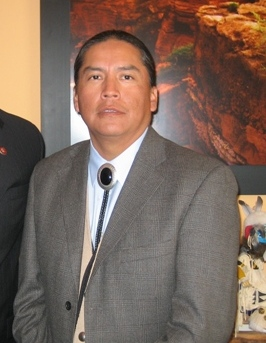
- Clark in 2007
- Citizenship: Navajo Nation and U.S.
- Education: Fort Lewis College (BA), Harvard University (MEd), University of Arizona (PhD)
- Title: President of Bacone College
- Term: 2018–2022
- Predecessor: Franklin Willis
- Successor: Nicky Michael

Ferlin Clark is a Native American academic administrator and educator. He is a citizen of the Navajo Nation and currently works as an administrator in the Office of Dine School Improvement of the Department of Dine Education. From 2018 to 2022, he served as president of Bacone College in Muskogee, Oklahoma.

== Early life and education ==
Ferlin Clark is Diné and a citizen of the Navajo Nation. He is originally from Crystal, New Mexico.

Clark received a bachelor's degree in English communications from Fort Lewis College in Durango, Colorado in 1988. He received a master's degree in education from Harvard University in 1992 and a doctoral degree in American Indian studies from the University of Arizona in 2009.

== Career ==
Early in his career, Ferlin Clark taught United States history and geography at Navajo Preparatory School.

In 1999, Clark was vice president for development at Diné College. In 2003, he became interim president of the college, and in 2004, he assumed the position permanently. Clark was removed as president by the Navajo Nation Supreme Court in 2010 amid an investigation into accusations of bullying and harassment of staff. He was succeeded by Marie Etsitty, who served as interim president until 2011.

After leaving Dine College, Clark served as executive staff assistant to Navajo Nation Vice President Rex Lee Jim.

He served as New Mexico Assistant Secretary of Indian Education from 2012 to 2014.

In April 2018, Clark was named the new president of Bacone College, replacing Franklin Willis. Under his leadership, Bacone sought tribal charters to become a tribally affiliated college and thus improve its financial stability. Under Clark's presidency, the college was chartered by the Osage Nation, the Kiowa Tribe, the Cheyenne and Arapaho Tribes, the Otoe–Missouria Tribe of Indians, and the United Keetoowah Band of Cherokee Indians. The college also underwent financial restructuring during his tenure; part of this has involved cutting sports programs including football and wrestling.

In 2022, Clark went on leave from Bacone College and was replaced by interim president Nicky Michael.

Clark currently works as an administrator in the Office of Dine School Improvement in the Department of Dine Education.

Clark has also served on the College Board and as vice president of the executive board and later secretary of the American Indian Higher Education Consortium.

== Personal life ==
Ferlin Clark is married to his wife, Gwen.
