= Armijo =

Armijo is a surname. Notable people with the surname include:

- Alberto Armijo (1926–2021), Costa Rican football player
- Antonio Armijo (1804–1850), Mexican explorer and merchant
- Christina Armijo (born 1951), American judge
- Dolores Elizabeth “Lola” Chávez de Armijo (1858–1929), American librarian
- José Gabriel de Armijo (1774–1830), Spanish-Mexican military commander
- Manuel Armijo (c. 1793–1853), Governor of New Mexico prior to the American conquest in 1846–1848.
- Perfecto Armijo (1845–1913), American frontier trader, store owner, probate judge, county sheriff, alderman, county treasurer and rancher
