= Bear Springs Treaty =

1846 treaty between the United States and Navajo

The Bear Spring (Ojo del Oso) Treaty was signed on November 22, 1846 between Chief Narbona and 13 other Navajo leaders and Colonel Alexander Doniphan representing the US Government at Bear Springs, New Mexico in the Navajo country, near the future site of Fort Wingate. It was the first of many treaties signed between the Navajo and the US Government. It was never ratified by the U.S. Senate.

== Background ==
The traditional Navajo homeland spans from Arizona through western New Mexico, where the Navajo had houses and raised livestock. There was a long historical pattern in the Southwest of groups or bands raiding and trading with each other. This included Navajo, Spanish, Mexican, Apache, Comanche, Ute, and the "new men" (Anglo-Americans), as Chief Narbona called them in 1846. Events before 1863, included a cycle of treaties, raids and counter-raids by the US Army, the Navajo and a civilian militia, with civilian speculators often on the fringe. Most of the militia involved were longtime enemies of the Navajo, like Spanish descendants from northern New Mexico, where Spain had established several settlements beginning in the late 16th century during the New Mexico's Colonial period.

== Events just before the treaty, September–October 1846 ==
The Navajo continue to raid despite the arrival of the US Military in 1846. General Stephen W. Kearny ordered the Navajo to attend a council in Santa Fe in September 1846. The Navajo did not show up. On October 2, Kearny sent a note to Col. William Doniphan, his second-in-command in Santa Fe to take all prisoners held by the Navajo and property which may have been stole from the inhabitants" of New Mexico. On October 5 while on his way to California Kearny stopped in Socorro, New Mexico. He wrote a proclamation there that authorized "all the inhabitants (Mexican & Pueblos) ...to form war parties, march into the country of their enemies, the Navajoes, to recover their property, to make reprisals and obtain redress for the many insults received from them. The old, the women and the children of the Navajoes must not be injured." In late October, Kearny ordered Doniphan to send a regiment of soldiers into Navajo country and secure a peace treaty with them.

A detachment of 30 men made contact with the Navajo and spoke to the Navajo Chief Narbona in mid-October.

== Treaty, November 22, 1846 ==
A second meeting between Chief Narbona and five hundred Navajo and Col. Doniphan occurred on November 22 at Bear Spring, Ojo del Oso, near where Fort Wingate would later be built. Doniphan informed the Navajo that all their land now belonged to the United States, and the Navajo and New Mexicans were the "children of the United States". The Navajo signed a treaty, known as the Bear Spring Treaty, on November 22, 1846. Given that the Navajos could not read or write, it is unlikely that they completely understood the Treaty they had signed.

The "Memorandum of a treaty entered into between Colonel A. W. Doniphan, commanding the United States' forces in the Navajo country, and the chiefs of the Navajo Nation of Indians", declared in Article I: "A firm and lasting peace and amity shall henceforth exist between the American people and the Navajo tribe of Indians" Article 2 noted the definition included New Mexicans and Pueblo peoples as being Americans, that Article 3 said free trade was guaranteed by both sides, with protection of any molestation and Articles 4 & 5 said the prisoners and property taken by both sides were to be restored.

== Aftermath ==
After the treaty was signed, gifts were exchanged as an expression of good will, according to John Hughes from 1847.

The treaty did little to end the conflict between the Navajo, the New Mexicans and recently arrived Anglos. The Navajo warriors continued to raid the New Mexicans and take their livestock. Likewise, New Mexican militia continued to raid the Navajo for livestock and slaves.

Further treaties would be signed and military actions taken, resulting in the Long Walk of the Navajo in 1863, and their return in 1868.
