= Canyon de Chelly National Monument =

National Park Service unit in Arizona, US

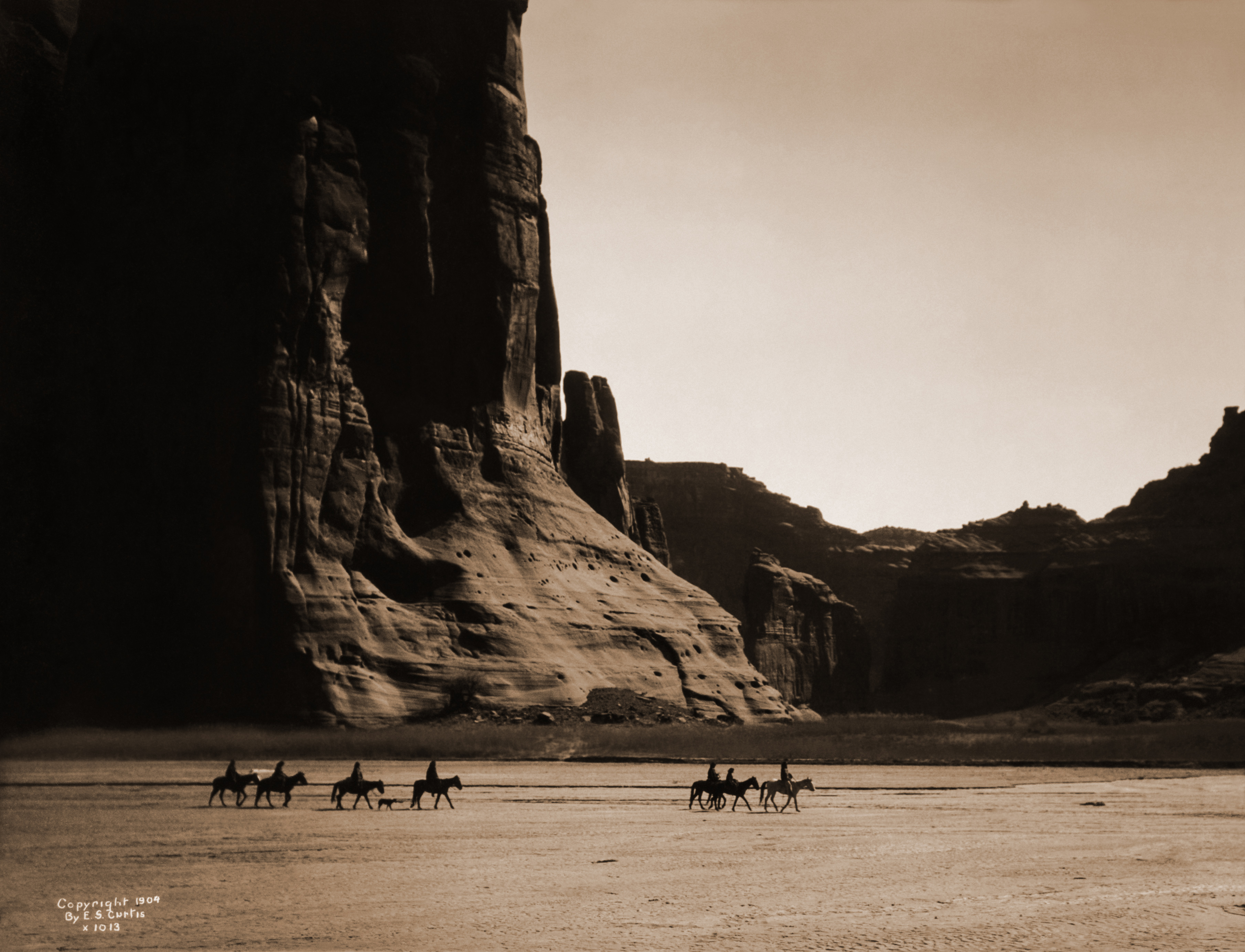
- Canyon de Chelly, 1904, by Edward S. Curtis

- Location within Arizona Location within the United States
- Interactive map of Canyon de Chelly National Monument
- Location: Apache County, Arizona
- Nearest city: Chinle
- Coordinates: 36.155281°N 109.508995°W
- Area: 83,840 acres (339.3 km^{2})
- Created: April 1, 1931
- Visitors: 340,586 (in 2025)
- Governing body: Bureau of Indian Affairs
- Website: Canyon de Chelly National Monument
- Canyon de Chelly National Monument
- U.S. National Register of Historic Places
- NRHP reference No.: 70000066
- Added to NRHP: August 25, 1970

U.S. National Monument

Canyon de Chelly National Monument (/dəˈʃeɪ/ də-SHAY) was established on April 1, 1931, as a unit of the National Park Service. Located in northeastern Arizona, it is within the boundaries of the Navajo Nation and lies in the Four Corners region. Reflecting one of the longest continuously inhabited landscapes of North America, it preserves ruins of the indigenous tribes that lived in the area, from the Ancestral Puebloans to the Navajo who eliminated them. The monument covers 83,840 acres (131 mi^{2}; 339 km^{2}) and encompasses the floors and rims of the three major canyons: de Chelly, del Muerto, and Monument. These canyons were cut by streams with headwaters in the Chuska Mountains just to the east of the monument. None of the land is federally owned. Canyon de Chelly is one of the most visited national monuments in the United States.

== Etymology ==
The name Chelly is a Spanish borrowing of the Navajo word Tséyiʼ (or Tsegi), which means "rock canyon" (literally "inside the rock" < tsé "rock" + -yiʼ "inside of, within"). The Navajo pronunciation is [tséɣiʔ]. The Spanish pronunciation of de Chelly [deˈtʃeʎi] was adapted into English, apparently modeled on a French-like spelling pronunciation, and is now /dəˈʃeɪ/ də-SHAY.

== History ==
Canyon de Chelly is thought to have been sporadically occupied by Hopi Indians from circa 1300 to the early 1700s, when the Navajo then moved into the canyon from places in northern New Mexico. From that time forward it has served as a home for Navajo people before it was invaded by forces led by future New Mexico governor Lt. Antonio Narbona in 1805, during which time they murdered 115 Navajos and kidnapped 33. In 1863, Col. Kit Carson sent troops through the canyon, murdering 23 Navajo, stealing 200 sheep, and destroying hogans, as well as peach orchards and other crops. The resulting demoralization forced the surrender of the Navajos and their removal to Bosque Redondo, New Mexico.

== Description ==
Canyon de Chelly is entirely owned by the Navajo Tribal Trust of the Navajo Nation. It is the only National Park Service unit that is owned and cooperatively managed in this manner. About 40 Navajo families live in the park. Access to the canyon floor is restricted, and visitors are allowed to travel in the canyons only when accompanied by a park ranger or an authorized Navajo guide. The only exception to this rule is the White House Ruin Trail. This trail has reopened from 2 August 2024 to 29 September 2024 without a fee; it will again reopen seasonally in April 2025, with exact times & fees to be determined.

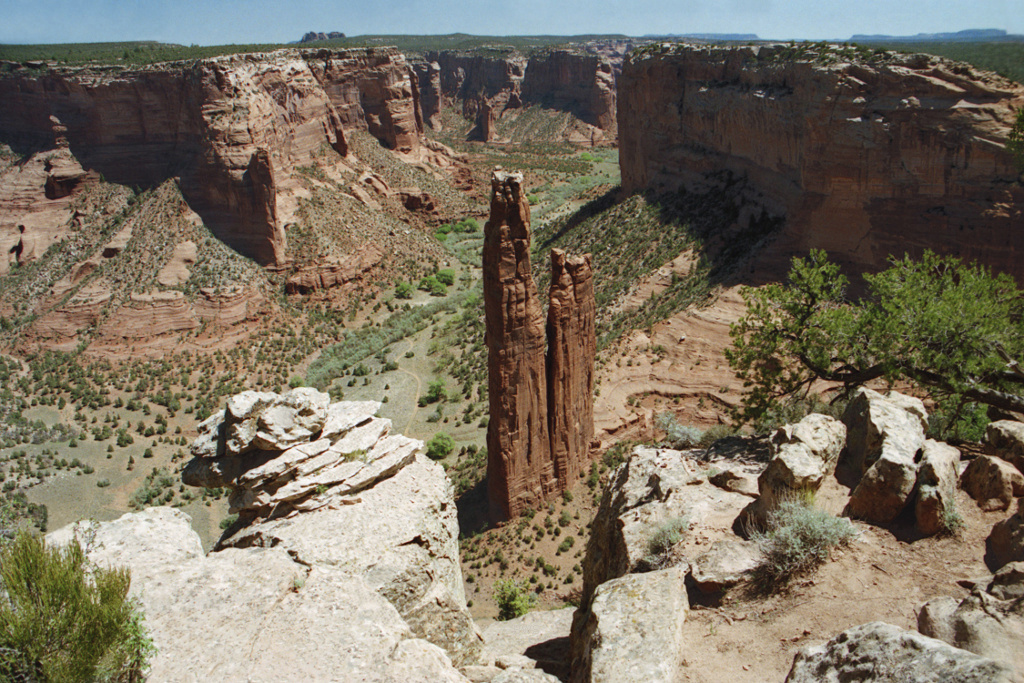
Spider Rock

The park's distinctive geologic feature, Spider Rock, is a sandstone spire that rises 750 feet (230 m) from the canyon floor at the junction of Canyon de Chelly and Monument Canyon. Spider Rock can be seen from South Rim Drive. It has served as the scene of a number of television commercials. According to traditional Navajo beliefs, the taller of the two spires is the home of Spider Grandmother.

Most park visitors arrive by automobile and view Canyon de Chelly from the rim, following both North Rim Drive and South Rim Drive. Ancient ruins and geologic structures are visible, but in the distance, from turnoffs on each of these routes. Deep within the park is Mummy Cave. It features structures that have been built at various times in history. Private Navajo-owned companies offer tours of the canyon floor by horseback, hiking or four-wheel drive vehicle. The companies can be contacted directly for prices and arrangements. No fee is charged to enter the park, apart from any charges imposed by tour companies. Commercial air tours are to be banned starting June 2025, barring legal challenges to the Federal Aviation Administration (FAA) and Park Service Dec. 2024 Air Tour Management Plan decision.

Accommodations for visitors are located in the vicinity of the canyon, on the road leading to Chinle, which is the nearest town.

The National Monument was listed on the National Register of Historic Places on August 25, 1970.

== Climate ==
According to the Köppen Climate Classification system, Canyon de Chelly has a cold semi-arid climate, abbreviated "BSk" on climate maps. The hottest temperature recorded in Canyon de Chelly was 105 °F (40.6 °C) on July 2, 2002, July 14, 2003, and June 21, 2016, while the coldest temperature recorded was −32 °F (−35.6 °C) on January 2, 1919.

Climate data for Canyon de Chelly, Arizona, 1991–2020 normals, extremes 1908–present
Month	Jan	Feb	Mar	Apr	May	Jun	Jul	Aug	Sep	Oct	Nov	Dec	Year
Record high °F (°C)	70 (21)	72 (22)	85 (29)	90 (32)	101 (38)	105 (41)	105 (41)	102 (39)	99 (37)	90 (32)	79 (26)	69 (21)	105 (41)
Mean maximum °F (°C)	57.3 (14.1)	64.1 (17.8)	74.6 (23.7)	82.6 (28.1)	91.3 (32.9)	99.4 (37.4)	100.9 (38.3)	96.9 (36.1)	92.4 (33.6)	83.4 (28.6)	69.8 (21.0)	58.8 (14.9)	101.5 (38.6)
Mean daily maximum °F (°C)	43.8 (6.6)	50.6 (10.3)	60.7 (15.9)	68.9 (20.5)	79.0 (26.1)	90.0 (32.2)	92.9 (33.8)	89.7 (32.1)	82.7 (28.2)	69.9 (21.1)	55.5 (13.1)	43.3 (6.3)	68.9 (20.5)
Daily mean °F (°C)	31.4 (−0.3)	37.1 (2.8)	45.0 (7.2)	52.4 (11.3)	61.4 (16.3)	71.3 (21.8)	76.5 (24.7)	74.2 (23.4)	66.2 (19.0)	53.7 (12.1)	41.0 (5.0)	31.4 (−0.3)	53.5 (11.9)
Mean daily minimum °F (°C)	19.0 (−7.2)	23.6 (−4.7)	29.2 (−1.6)	35.8 (2.1)	43.7 (6.5)	52.5 (11.4)	60.2 (15.7)	58.8 (14.9)	49.8 (9.9)	37.5 (3.1)	26.5 (−3.1)	19.6 (−6.9)	38.0 (3.3)
Mean minimum °F (°C)	5.2 (−14.9)	10.3 (−12.1)	17.1 (−8.3)	22.9 (−5.1)	31.3 (−0.4)	40.1 (4.5)	51.9 (11.1)	51.4 (10.8)	36.1 (2.3)	24.2 (−4.3)	12.1 (−11.1)	5.0 (−15.0)	1.2 (−17.1)
Record low °F (°C)	−32 (−36)	−22 (−30)	1 (−17)	9 (−13)	10 (−12)	20 (−7)	38 (3)	38 (3)	23 (−5)	10 (−12)	−3 (−19)	−27 (−33)	−32 (−36)
Average precipitation inches (mm)	0.76 (19)	0.73 (19)	0.65 (17)	0.48 (12)	0.51 (13)	0.27 (6.9)	1.07 (27)	1.30 (33)	0.85 (22)	0.83 (21)	0.58 (15)	0.72 (18)	8.75 (222.9)
Average snowfall inches (cm)	1.1 (2.8)	0.9 (2.3)	0.6 (1.5)	0.1 (0.25)	0.0 (0.0)	0.0 (0.0)	0.0 (0.0)	0.0 (0.0)	0.0 (0.0)	0.1 (0.25)	0.6 (1.5)	1.5 (3.8)	4.9 (12.4)
Average precipitation days (≥ 0.01 in)	4.4	4.7	4.1	3.1	2.8	1.7	6.3	6.9	5.2	4.1	3.5	4.8	51.6
Average snowy days (≥ 0.1 in)	0.8	0.7	0.7	0.1	0.0	0.0	0.0	0.0	0.0	0.1	0.4	1.0	3.8
Source 1: NOAA
Source 2: National Weather Service

== Gallery ==
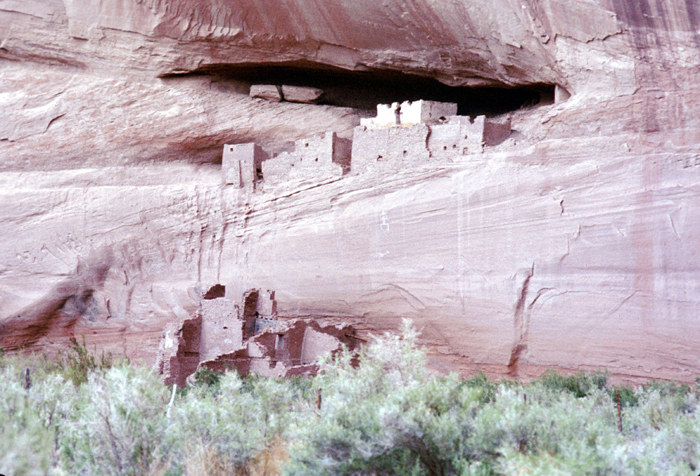
White House Ruin

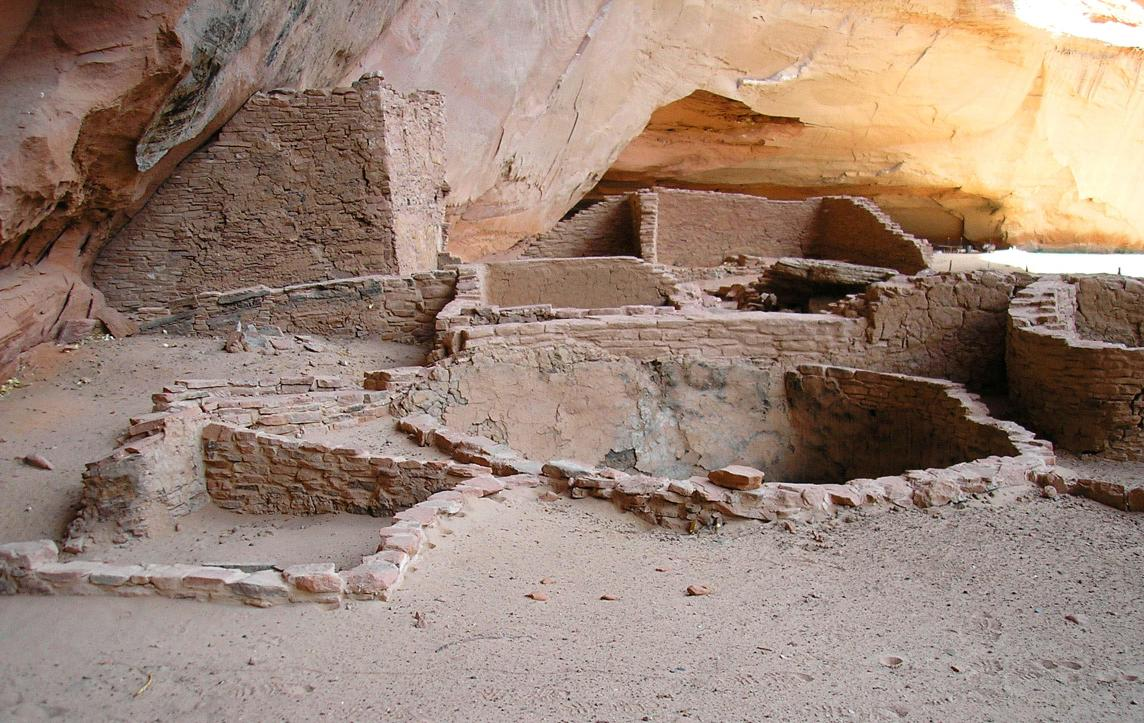
Antelope House Ruin

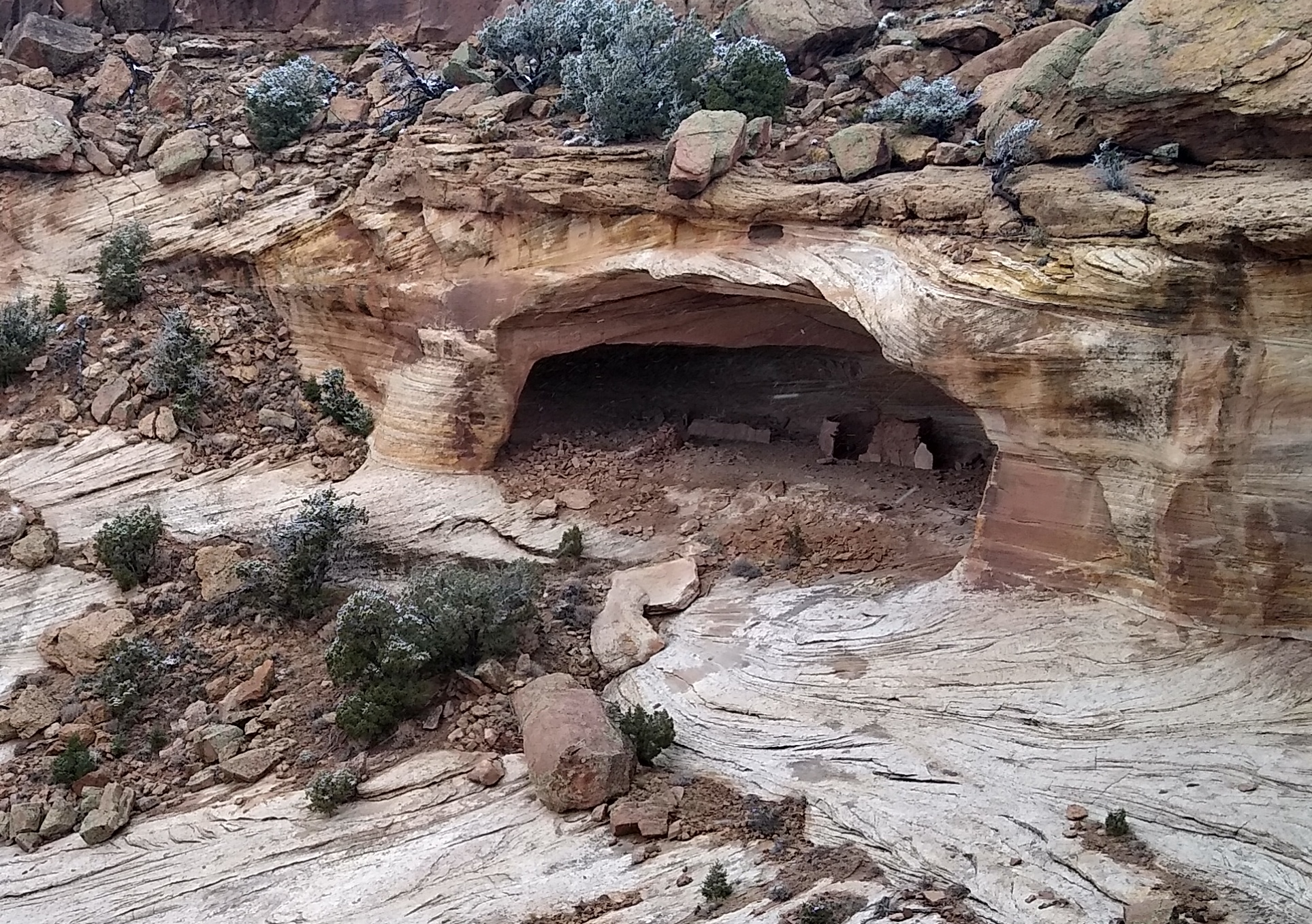
Massacre Cave

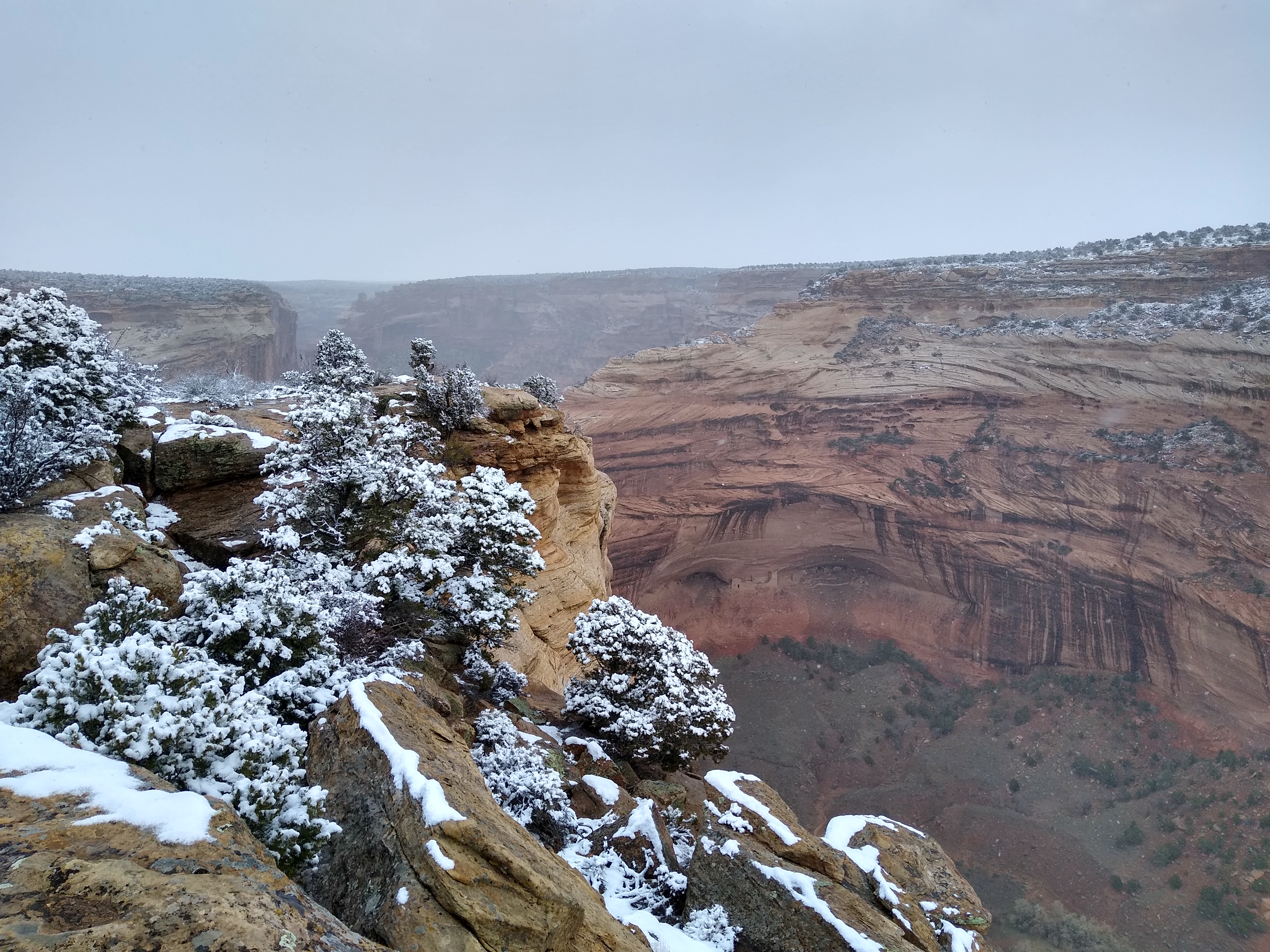
Snow at the canyon, with Mummy Cave in the background

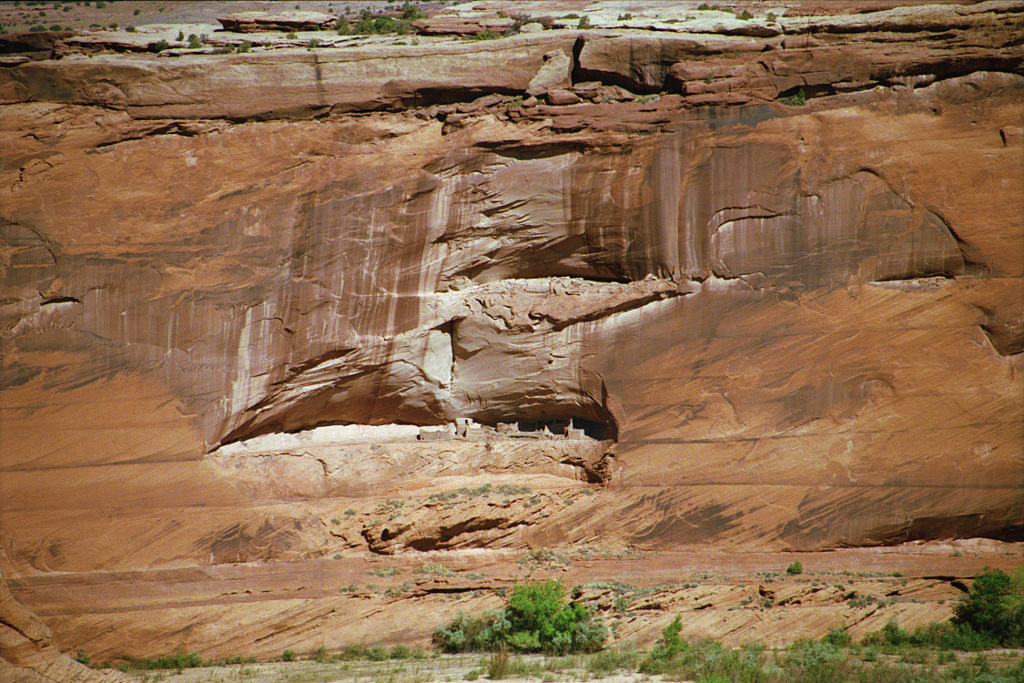
First Ruin

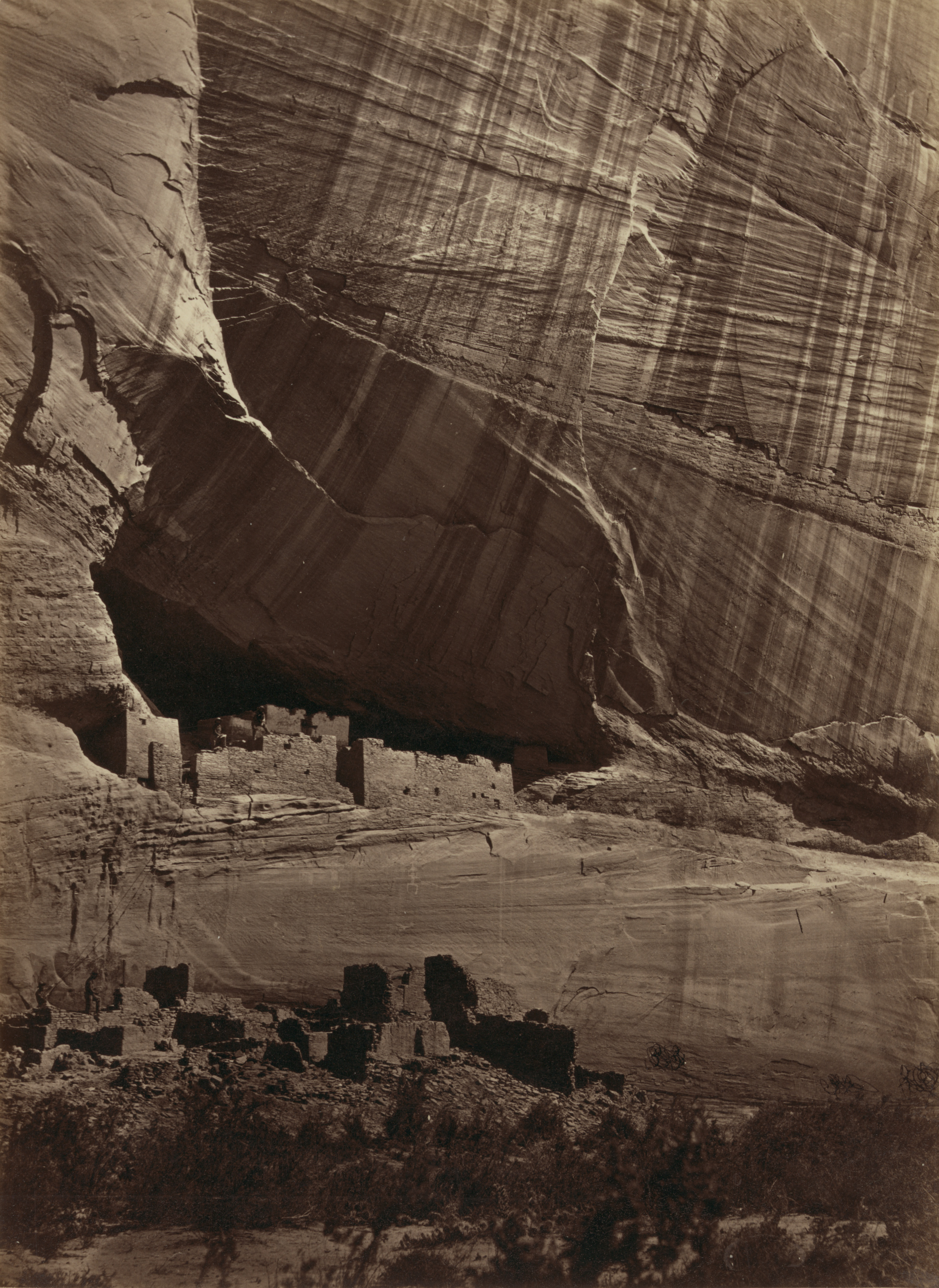
White House Ruin, Timothy H. O'Sullivan, 1873

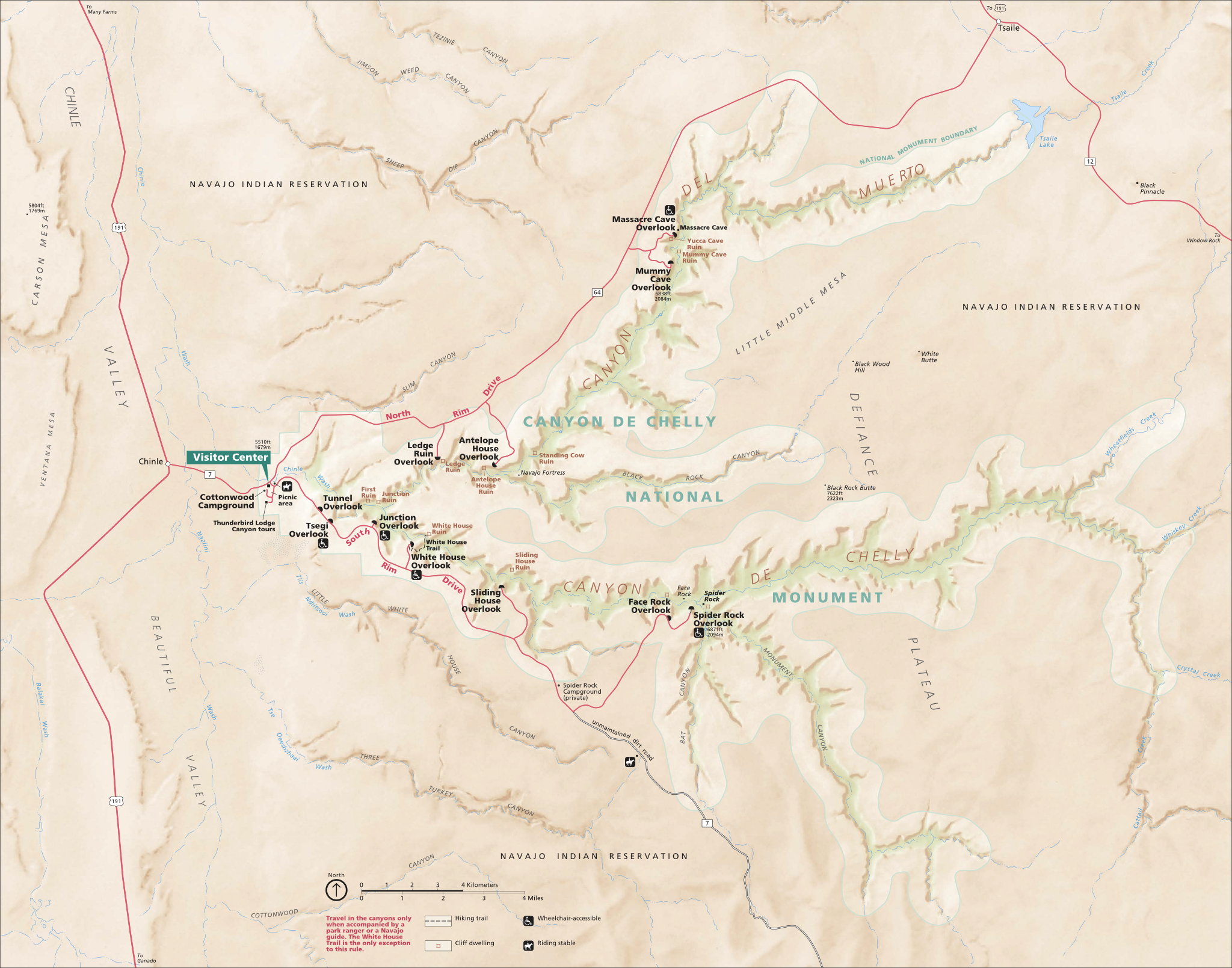
Park map

== See also ==
- List of national monuments of the United States
- Ancestral Puebloans
- Battle of Canyon de Chelly
- Mesa Verde National Park
- National Register of Historic Places listings in Apache County, Arizona
