= Fort Sumner =

Coordinates: 34°24′07″N 104°11′41″W

- Fort Sumner Ruins
- U.S. National Register of Historic Places
- New Mexico Historic Site
- NM State Register of Cultural Properties
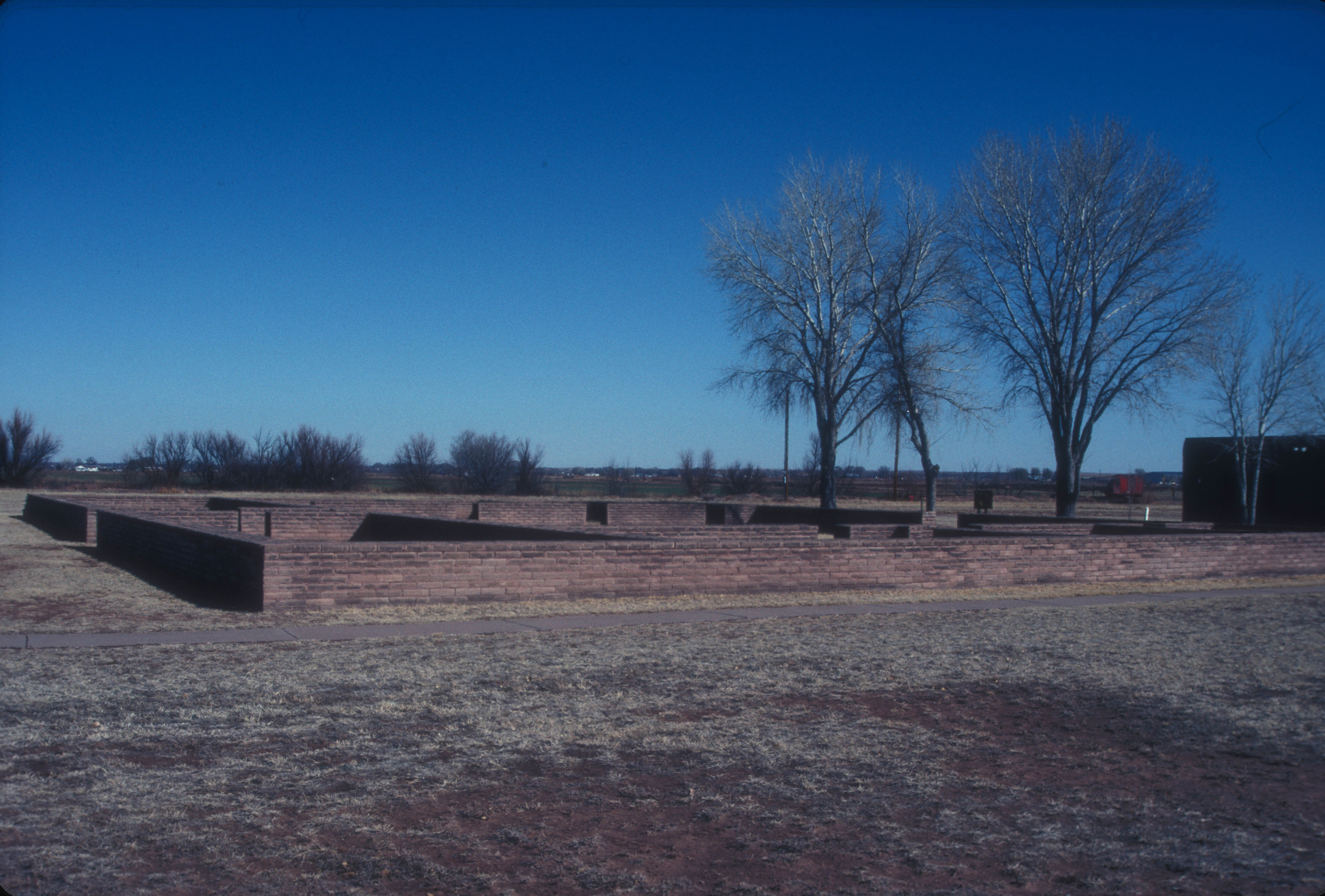
- Fort Sumner
- Nearest city: Fort Sumner, New Mexico
- Area: 50 acres (20 ha)
- Built: 1862
- Architect: Alexander LaRue
- NRHP reference No.: 74001194
- NMSRCP No.: 139

Significant dates
- Added to NRHP: August 13, 1974
- Designated NMHS: 1968
- Designated NMSRCP: January 9, 1970

Fort Sumner was a military fort in New Mexico Territory charged with the internment of Navajo and Mescalero Apache populations from 1863 to 1868 at nearby Bosque Redondo.

== History ==
On October 31, 1862, Congress authorized the construction of Fort Sumner. General James Henry Carleton initially justified the fort as offering protection to settlers in the Pecos River valley from the Mescalero Apache, Kiowa, and Comanche. He also created the Bosque Redondo reservation, a 1,600-square-mile (4,100 km^{2}; 1,000,000-acre) area where over 9,000 Navajo and Mescalero Apache were forced to live because of accusations that they were raiding white settlements near their respective homelands. The fort was named for General Edwin Vose Sumner.

The reservation was to be self-sufficient, while teaching Navajo and Mescalero Apache how to be modern farmers. General Edward Canby, whom Carleton replaced, had first suggested that the Navajo people be moved to a series of reservations and be taught new skills. Some in Washington, D.C. thought that the Navajo should not be moved and that a reservation should be created on their own land. The 1865 and 1866 corn crop was sufficient, but in 1867 it was a total failure. Army officers and Indian agents realized that Bosque Redondo was a failure, as it had poor water and too little firewood for the numbers of people who were living there. The Mescalero soon ran away; the Navajo stayed longer, but were permitted to return to their native lands in May 1868.

When the Bosque Redondo was established, General Carleton ordered Colonel Kit Carson to do whatever necessary to bring first the Mescalero and then the Navajo there. All of the Mescalero Apache had been relocated by the end of 1862, but the Navajo were not resettled in large numbers until early 1864. The Navajo refer to the journey from Navajo land to the Bosque Redondo as the Long Walk. More than 300 Navajo died making the journey. It was a bitter memory to many Navajo. One man described it as follows: "By slow stages we traveled eastward by present Gallup and Shushbito, Bear spring, which is now called Fort Wingate. You ask how they treated us? If there was room the soldiers put the women and children on the wagons. Some even let them ride behind them on their horses. I have never been able to understand a people who killed you one day and on the next played with your children...?"

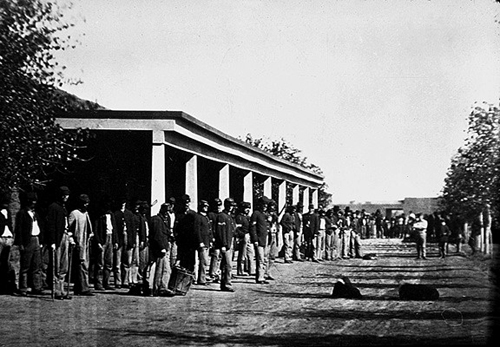
US troops at Fort Sumner.

In April 1865, there were about 8,500 Navajo and 500 Mescalero Apache interned at Bosque Redondo. The Army had planned only 5,000 would be there, so lack of sufficient food was an issue from the start. As the Navajo and Mescalero Apache had long been enemies, their enforced proximity led to frequent open fighting. The environmental situation worsened. The interned people did not have clean water; it was full of alkali and there was no firewood to cook with. The water from the nearby Pecos River caused severe intestinal problems, and disease quickly spread throughout the camp. Food was in short supply because of crop failures, Army and Indian agent bungling, and criminal activities. In 1865, the Mescalero Apache, or those strong enough to travel, managed to escape. The Navajo were not allowed to leave until May 1868 when the US Army agreed that Fort Sumner and the Bosque Redondo reservation was a failure.

The 1868 Treaty of Bosque Redondo was negotiated with the Navajo and they were allowed to return to their homeland, to a "new reservation". They were joined by the thousands of Navajo who had been hiding out in the Arizona Territory hinterlands. This experience resulted in a more determined Navajo, and never again were they surprised by raiders of the Rio Grande Valley. In subsequent years, they have expanded the "new reservation" into well over 16 million acres (65,000 km^{2}).

Fort Sumner was abandoned in 1869 and purchased by rancher and cattle baron Lucien Maxwell. Maxwell rebuilt one of the officers' quarters into a 20-room house. Maxwell's daughter, Paulita, was a friend of Billy the Kid. On July 14, 1881, Sheriff Pat Garrett shot and killed Billy the Kid in this house, now referred to as the Maxwell House.

== Fort Sumner Historic Site ==
A hundred years after the signing of the treaty that allowed the Navajo people to return to their original homes in the Four Corners region, Fort Sumner was declared a New Mexico State Monument in 1968.

The property is now managed by the New Mexico Historic Sites (formerly State Monuments) division of the New Mexico Department of Cultural Affairs. On June 4, 2005, a new museum designed by Navajo architect David N. Sloan was opened on the site as the Bosque Redondo Memorial. Congress had authorized the establishment of the memorial by the Secretary of Defense in 2000, making federal funds available for construction.

The Bosque Redondo Memorial and Fort Sumner Historic Site are located 6.5 miles (10.5 km) southeast of Fort Sumner, New Mexico: 3 miles (4.8 km) east on US Route 60/US Route 84, then 3.5 miles (5.6 km) south on Billy the Kid Road.

== See also ==
- National Register of Historic Places listings in De Baca County, New Mexico
