= Narbona Pass =

Mountain pass in New Mexico, United States

- Washington Pass
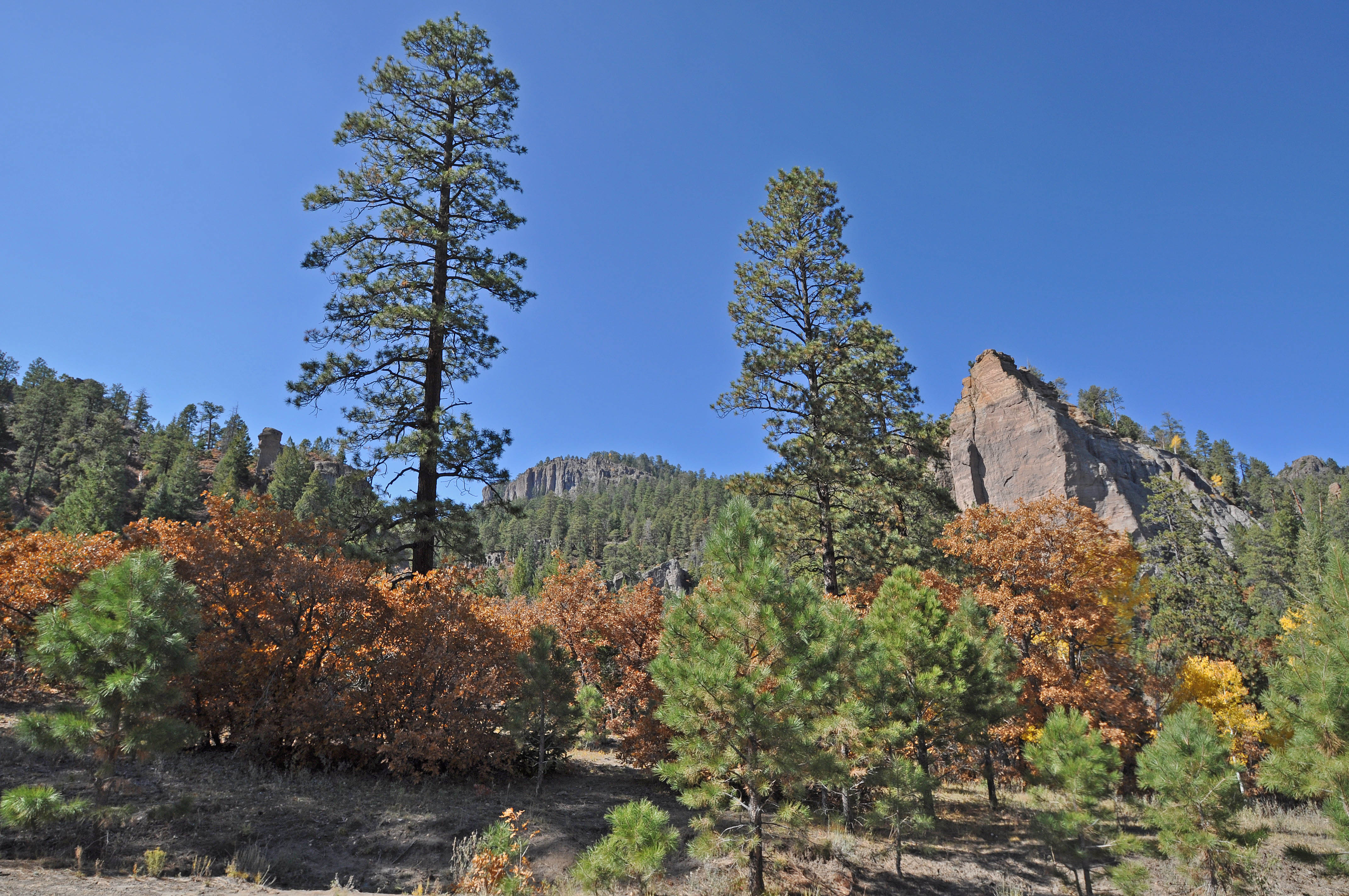
- Chuska Mountains near Narbona Pass

- Location within New Mexico
- Elevation: 8,721 feet (2,658 m)
- Traversed by: NM 134

Third Approach
- Location: San Juan County, New Mexico
- Coordinates: 36°05′24″N 108°51′36″W

Narbona Pass (formerly Washington Pass) is a pass through the natural break between the Tunicha and Chuska Mountains, an elongated range on the Colorado Plateau on the Navajo Nation. A paved road, New Mexico Highway 134, crosses the range through Narbona Pass, connecting Sheep Springs to Crystal. Contrary to the Navajo tradition of not naming monuments after people, the pass was given the name Narbona to celebrate his victory over an invading Mexican army that was sent to destroy the Navajo in 1835. Known in the Navajo Language as So Sila (Twin Stars), the pass was lately named in English for Colonel John M. Washington in 1859. He was a New Mexico military governor who led an expedition into Navajo country in 1849 in which he was accused of walling up a Navajo Spring, and whose troops later shot Navajo leader Narbona.

In 1992 the pass gained its current name, which honors Narbona.

== Etymology ==
The name Narbona Pass comes from the Navajo chief Narbona to celebrate his victory over a hostile Mexican invasion of traditional Navajo land.

== Geology ==
The Narbona Pass runs through the caldera of the long-extinct Narbona Pass volcano, which formed from violent explosive activity. Before being eroded to their present condition, many of the Chuska-Shiprock volcanoes may have had similar explosive vent structures. The basal deposits in the crater are 5 metres (16 ft) to 20 metres (66 ft) thick, composed of massive lapilli tuff or tuff breccia, overlaid by layers of different deposits that indicate a series of explosive phases. These created a complex mix of sheets of volcanic ash overlaid by thick trachytic lava flows. Three basalt magma flows occurred between 27.5 and 24.3 million years ago. The crater is around 2 miles (3.2 km) across, with walls 700 feet (210 m) high.

Chuska Sandstone is exposed along the crest of the Chuska Mountains in the west of the Narbona Pass. It is the remains of the Chuska erg, a windswept sand field from the Oligocene era, about 34 million to 23 million years ago. The erg is thought to have covered about 125,000 square kilometres (48,000 sq mi) in the southeast Colorado Plateau, and was surrounded by volcanic fields of the same era. The sandstone mostly came from the Precambrian basement of central Arizona, with uranium-lead dates peaking around 1700 million years ago and 1425 million years ago. The sandstone to the west was later eroded, with 1,500 metres (4,900 ft) being lost in the basin, but remnants remain on the mountains.

== Climate ==
On 3 September 1849 the diarist of the Washington expedition said of the western entrance to the park, "I noticed towering pines and firs, also the oak, the aspen, and the willow; and bordering the stream there was a great variety of shrubbery, the hop vine, loaded with its fruit, being intertwined among them. Flowers of rich profusion and of every hue and delicacy, were also constantly before the eye–upwards of ninety varieties having been picked up since we entered the gorge [Narbona Pass] yesterday. Indeed, we are all in hopes that, yesterday and today, we have been having an earnest of what we may yet behold in this part of the world–a rich, well-timbered and sufficiently well-watered country."

However, even in July, the temperature is cool, only reaching 70 °F (21 °C) at noon. Only two months of the year are free of frost. In the winter, up to 50 inches (1,300 mm) of snow may accumulate in drifts on north-facing slopes in the pass. Writing in 1884 about a proposed sheep ranch, Thomas Keam said, "The mountain plain was very pleasant in summer, but entirely impracticable in winter, as it is one of the coldest places on the reservation. [I] was told that it was one of the coldest places on the reservation ... in winter ... it is often covered with two feet of snow."

== Prehistory ==
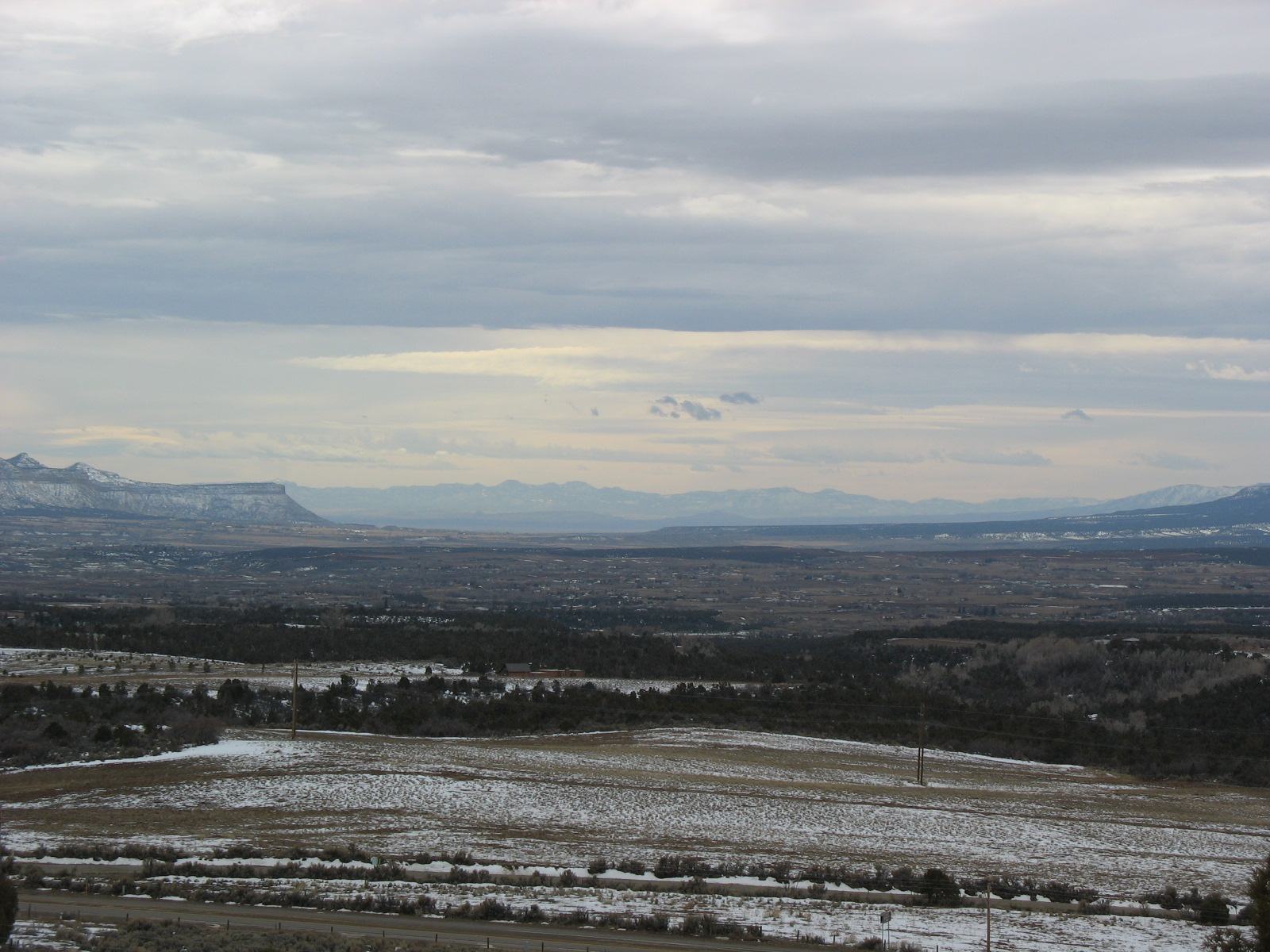
Chuska Mountains from a distance. The Narbona Pass provides the only route through this elongated chain.

Narbona Pass Chert is finely textured and has regular breakage patterns that make it an excellent material for making stone tools and weapon heads by flintknapping. The chert has a variety of colors including white, pale blue, dark gray and pink. The Narbona Pass in the Chuska mountains holds the only known quarry for this pure, fine-grained and distinctive rock. The chert was traded throughout what is now the Four Corners region, then inhabited by the Ancestral Puebloans, often called Chaco people after their rock wall structures in Chaco Canyon to the east of Narbona Pass.

Apart from the buildings in the Chaco Canyon, there were great houses distributed across the lands of the Chaco people, some dating from the Chaco era (900–1150 AD) and others of more recent date. Exotic materials like Narbona Pass Chert are found much more often in the Chaco Canyon assemblages of stone tools than in those of the other great houses. In Chaco Canyon between 1020 AD and 1120 AD, the chert accounted for more than 20% of the material used for making stone tools, apparently imported in its raw form rather than as manufactured tools. Narbona Pass chert is also present in Bluff Great House, Navajo Springs and Lake Valley from the Chaco period, but accounts for less than one part in a thousand of the total chipped stone. It is not found at all in Chimney Rock Pueblo or Raton Well. However, it is common in the assemblages of Crumbled House, on the lower slopes of the Chuska Mountains, which was occupied after the Chaco Canyon period.

In January 2009 researchers from the Crow Canyon Archaeological Center found a projectile point made of pink stone in Bluebird House, a small pueblo in the Goodman Point group of the Hovenweep National Monument, about 90 miles (140 km) to the north of Narbona pass. The material was identified as Narbona Pass Chert, a rare find for archaeological sites anywhere in the Mesa Verde region to the north of the San Juan River. Most likely the artifact was made during the period between 1000 AD and 1140 AD, when there was an extensive regional trading network centered on Chaco Canyon. It was probably manufactured using a pressure flaking technique in Narbona Pass before being exported to Crow Canyon. The Pueblo flintknapper would have used a long, pointed "soft-hammer" such as a deer antler.

== Early history ==
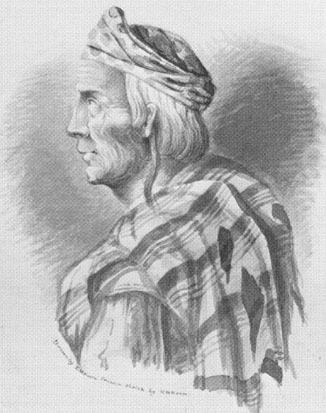
Sketch of Navajo chief Narbona by Richard H. Kern made on 31 August 1849, hours before he was killed

The Navajo people, Southern Athabaskan nomadic hunter-gatherers, arrived in the southwest around 1400 AD and settled in the mountains between the valleys occupied by the Pueblos. The Navajo became farmers, and then herders. Through raids, trade and intermarriage, the Navajo acquired many aspects of the Pueblo culture. However, they remained warlike and in effect defined the northern limit to Spanish expansion. The stronghold of the Canyon de Chelly, to the west of the Narbona Pass, became the sacred center of the Navajo people. Narbona Pass was called Beesh Lichii'ii Bigiizh, or Copper Pass, by the Navajo people. The Navajo see the Chuska range as the body of a male god. Chuska peak is its head, Narbona Pass the neck, the Tunicha and Lukachukai ranges are the body and the Carrizo Mountains are the legs and feet.

During the early nineteenth century there were frequent Navajo raids into Mexican territory and attacks on traders using the Santa Fe Trail, and counter-raids by the Mexicans, often for the purpose of slavery. In 1804 the Navajos made attacks on the Spanish military post at Cebolletta, and on nearby settlements. They were trying to recover their grazing land at the foot of Mount Taylor, their sacred Turquoise Mountain. In 1805 the Spanish Lt. Col. Antonio Narbona (no relative of the Navajo leader) crossed the Narbona Pass on a retaliatory expedition from Zuni Pueblo into Canyon de Chelly. The Narbona expedition killed more than 115 Navajo and took 33 women and children as slaves.

In February 1835 the Mexican Captain Blas de Hinojos left Santa Fe and headed west into Navajo country with a force of almost 1,000 Mexican troops on a slaving expedition. On 28 February 1835, Hinojo's force entered the pass. The Navajo headman Narbona had heard of Hinojos's advance, knew he had to come through the pass to reach the Canyon de Chelly, and had carefully prepared an ambush by about 250 warriors. Narbona held back his forces, who were hidden on both sides of the defile. He told them that when the time was right, and not before, they would cut the long file of men into small pieces, like cutting a long tree trunk into firewood. When the owl hoot signal was given, the Navajos poured arrows into the column, those who had guns fired, and some threw stones or rolled rocks into the gorge. Taken completely by surprise, both men and horses panicked and were routed. Many of the Mexicans were killed, including their leader. It is said that the bones of some of those killed in the battle may still be found in the pass, as can some of the wooden ladders that the Navajos used to climb up the Standing Rocks where they hid before the ambush.

In 1849, shortly after the United States had taken control of New Mexico from the Mexicans, Colonel John M. Washington led a strong force of soldiers and volunteers west into Navajo country. They were met by Navajo envoys who said they were willing to discuss peace, and then encountered the main Navajo forces. The Navajos, led by Narbona and José Largo, brought gifts that included many sheep and horses. After the talks, one of the Navajos was accused of stealing a horse from a Mexican who was accompanying the troops. When the Navajos made to leave, Washington's troops shot six of them as they fled, including Narbona. The 82-year-old Narbona, with his long white hair, was scalped by a U.S. militiaman. The expedition moved on through the pass, which they named "Washington Pass" in honor of their leader.

== Later history ==
In 1864 Colonel Kit Carson began a scorched earth policy with his 1st Regiment New Mexico Volunteer Cavalry, destroying the Navajo herds and crops, followed by an invasion of Canyon de Chelly. Eight thousand Navajos were forced to walk to Fort Sumner in the east of New Mexico in 1866, where they were expected to take up farming. Many died on the march or later from smallpox. The survivors were allowed to return in 1868, and were assigned reservation lands that covered 11,500,000 acres (4,700,000 ha) by 1886. The first known trader in the Washington Pass was Romulo Martinez, a Spanish-American from Fort Defiance, in 1873. On 31 March 1877 Perry H. Williams was licensed to trade at Washington Pass. Ben Hyatt traded there from 1882 to 1884, and Stephen Aldrich and Elias Clark traded for one season in 1884. The names of other traders are recorded for the following years, but they seem all to have been temporary, trading from tents in the summer season.

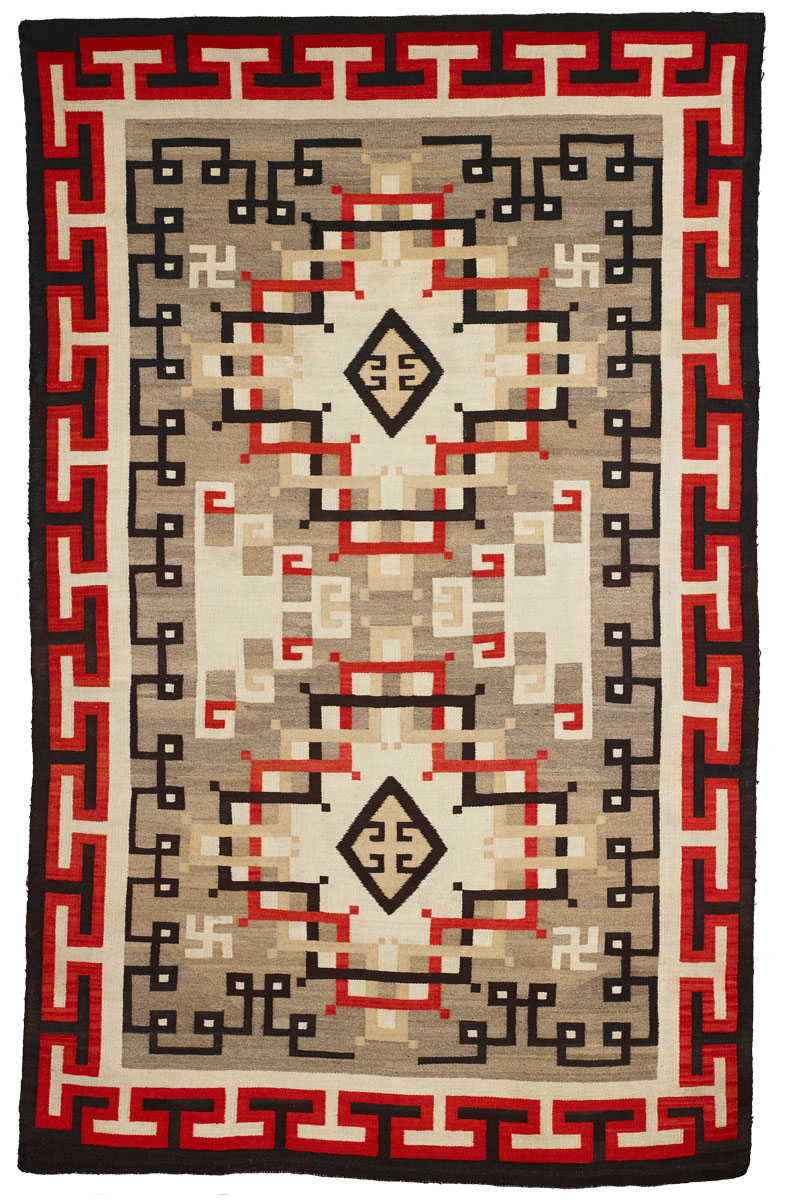
A Navajo wool rug in the Early Crystal style, including swastikas (Note: A number of Moore's designs incorporated the "whirling log" symbol, or swastika, a common Aryan symbol he had copied from oriental rugs. In the 1940s, it became unpopular with purchasers.) in the design, date 1900-1920 AD

In 1896 John Bradford Moore arrived, an Irishman from Sheridan, Wyoming who had no problem with the climate. He bought the trading site, then cut timber in the mountains and hauled it down to build a log trading post, which he stocked with supplies carted from the rail head in Gallup. His post was in the western entrance to the pass. He named it the Crystal Trading Post. During the winter months, he employed Navajo weavers to make rugs. Moore ensured that the wool and the weaving was good quality, and created designs of his own, quickly gaining a reputation as a source of good quality rugs.

Moore's business flourished, and in 1903 and in 1911 he published mail-order catalogs, drawing business from across the United States. Moore understood what the market in the eastern United States would value, and in his catalog stressed the use of natural materials and primitive technology. Nevertheless, he introduced production-line techniques, and had no problem with using machine-produced yarns with synthetic dyes. Traders in Navajo rugs had to keep costs down to be able to offer competitive prices, therefore wages were low. Talking of the weaver's life, Moore said, "there is no more dismal wage proposition than her remuneration for her part in the industry. Given any other paying outlet for her labor, there would very soon be no such thing as a blanket industry ... it is her one and only way of earning money."

Moore was succeeded by A. J. Molohon, who continued to introduce complex non-Navajo styles that probably drew on Oriental rug designs. The Crystal Trading Post was owned by the C.C. Manning company from 1919 to 1922. Later Charlie Newcomb and then Jim Collyer owned the post. Until the 1930s the Crystal rugs were bordered, with a central design woven in natural colors, sometimes with some red. After this, the style changed to banded rugs with distinctive "wavy" lines made by alternating weft strands in two or three different colors. A typical new-style Crystal rug will alternate groups of two or three wavy or solid lines with broader bands decorated with patterns representing squash blossoms or geometrical motifs. The newer rugs are woven in muted colors such as rust, rich brown and grey, but may include pastel colors. In 1944 Don Jensen bought the post, holding it until 1981. Apparently Jenson developed the current Crystal rug.

The Navajo gradually became more prosperous and more autonomous, although there were periodic problems such as crises of overgrazing. In the 1950s development of coal, oil and uranium brought money into the Navajo community along with social problems and pollution. Most Navajos forgot about the past events and assumed the pass was named after George Washington, or perhaps Washington, D.C. However, in 1990 students of the Navajo Community College in Shiprock learned the true history, became indignant about having an enemy of the Navajos commemorated in the name of an important location on the Navajo Nation, and started a campaign to change the name to "Narbona Pass". They gained widespread support. On 10 December 1992 the United States Board on Geographic Names voted unanimously in favor of the change, perhaps the first time that Native Americans initiated a place name commemorating a Native American. Narbona Pass is also one of the few Native American sites to be named after the victim in a dispute.

== Today ==
The 33rd Annual Narbona Pass Classic, formerly the Washington Pass Classic, was held on 1 July 2012. There were three events: a non-competitive 5 kilometres (3.1 mi) fitness walk, a 5 kilometres (3.1 mi) run and a 10 kilometres (6.2 mi) run. The 10 km race, among the top 100 races over this distance in the United States, is held every year on the 4th of July weekend. In 2000, almost all of the 400 or more competitors in the very demanding race were local, supported by their family and friends with a relaxed outdoor barbecue environment around the finish line. Running is part of the Navajo culture, although perhaps because that culture also de-emphasizes competition there are relatively few Navajo runners at the elite levels of the sport.

The Narbona Pass Classic race is challenging, through difficult forest terrain. Nicholas Kipruto, a former Diné College runner from Kenya, set a record for the 10 km race in 2009 with a time of 34:07. The winner in 2011 was Jackson Thomas of Naschitti with a time of 39:43. That year three of the competitors in the 5 km race were women in their seventies. In 2012 Kipruto won again with a time of 34:36 followed by Jackson Thomas with a time of 39:40.

There is a relatively easy cross-country ski trail in the crater from the road to Todacheene Lake. It is about 3 miles (4.8 km) long with a vertical gain of 200 feet (61 m). The road up to and through the pass is also used for biking. With an out-and-back length of 36 miles (58 km), starting at 5,900 feet (1,800 m) and rising to 8,700 feet (2,700 m) at the top of the pass, the rider must be in good physical shape. Part of the reward is the spectacular panoramic views. There is an unserviced campground in the pass. A fee is payable, and campfires are allowed.
