= Manuel Álvarez =

Manuel Álvarez may refer to:

- Manuel Álvarez Álvarez (1908–1938), Spanish soldier, commanded the Republican 42nd Division in the Civil War
- Manuel Álvarez Bravo (1902–2002), Mexican photographer
- Manuel Álvarez (footballer) (1928–1998), Chilean football defender who played for Chile in the 1950 FIFA World Cup
- Manuel Álvarez Ortega (1923–2014), Spanish poet, translator, writer, and veterinarian
- Manuel Alvarez (politician), U.S. politician from Arizona
- Manuel Álvarez (sprinter) (1910–1991), Mexican sprinter who competed in the 1932 Summer Olympics
- Manuel Álvarez (trader) (1794–1856), Spanish-born trader and later politician in Santa Fe, New Mexico
- Manuel Álvarez-Uría (born 1943), Spanish cell biologist
- Manuel Alejandro Álvarez Jofré (1868–1960), Chilean jurist, judge on the International Court of Justice
- Manuel Francisco Álvarez de la Peña (1727–1797), Spanish sculptor
- Manny Alvarez (born c. 1957), Cuban-American obstetrician-gynecologist

== See also ==
- José Manuel Álvarez, governor of Córdoba, Argentina, 1901–1904
- Juan Manuel Álvarez (disambiguation)
