= Auguste Lacome =

Auguste Sylvestre LaCome
- Born: October 25, 1821; Ordizan, France
- Died: November 11, 1888 (aged 67); Arroyo Hondo, New Mexico
- Occupation: Trader/merchant
- Spouse: Maria Rosa Arellano
- Children: José Eulogia, Gabriel Augustin, Silvestre Augustin, Juan Bautista, Juana Josefa (adopted), Pedro Antonio (adopted), Juan Maria
- Parent(s): Jean Paul LaCome and Jeanette Doleac

Auguste Sylvestre LaCome (October 25, 1821 – November 11, 1888) was a French settler and trader in the New Mexico Territory and brother of Jean Baptiste (Juan Bautista) LaCome. He led the search for the survivors of the White massacre.

== Biography ==
=== Early life ===
Auguste LaCome was born in the township of Ordizan near the French/Spanish border. His maternal grandfather, Alexis Doleac, left the priesthood to join the French Revolution in the name of liberty and equality. LaCome's father worked as a medical officer. His parents had three other sons besides Auguste and Jean Baptiste. One of those brothers, Joseph LaCome, also left France to travel to South America. None of their three daughters survived to adulthood.

US census records list Auguste LaCome's birthplace as both France and Spain, but he and his brother are referred to as "Frenchmen" in contemporary sources. He was issued a passport on August 6, 1842, and left from the port of Bordeaux aboard the Talma on September 9, 1842. He landed at New Orleans before settling in the New Mexico Territory. LaCome's physical appearance is described as being 1.73 meters tall (5'10") with chestnut hair and eyebrows, oval face, and pointed chin.

=== Family ===
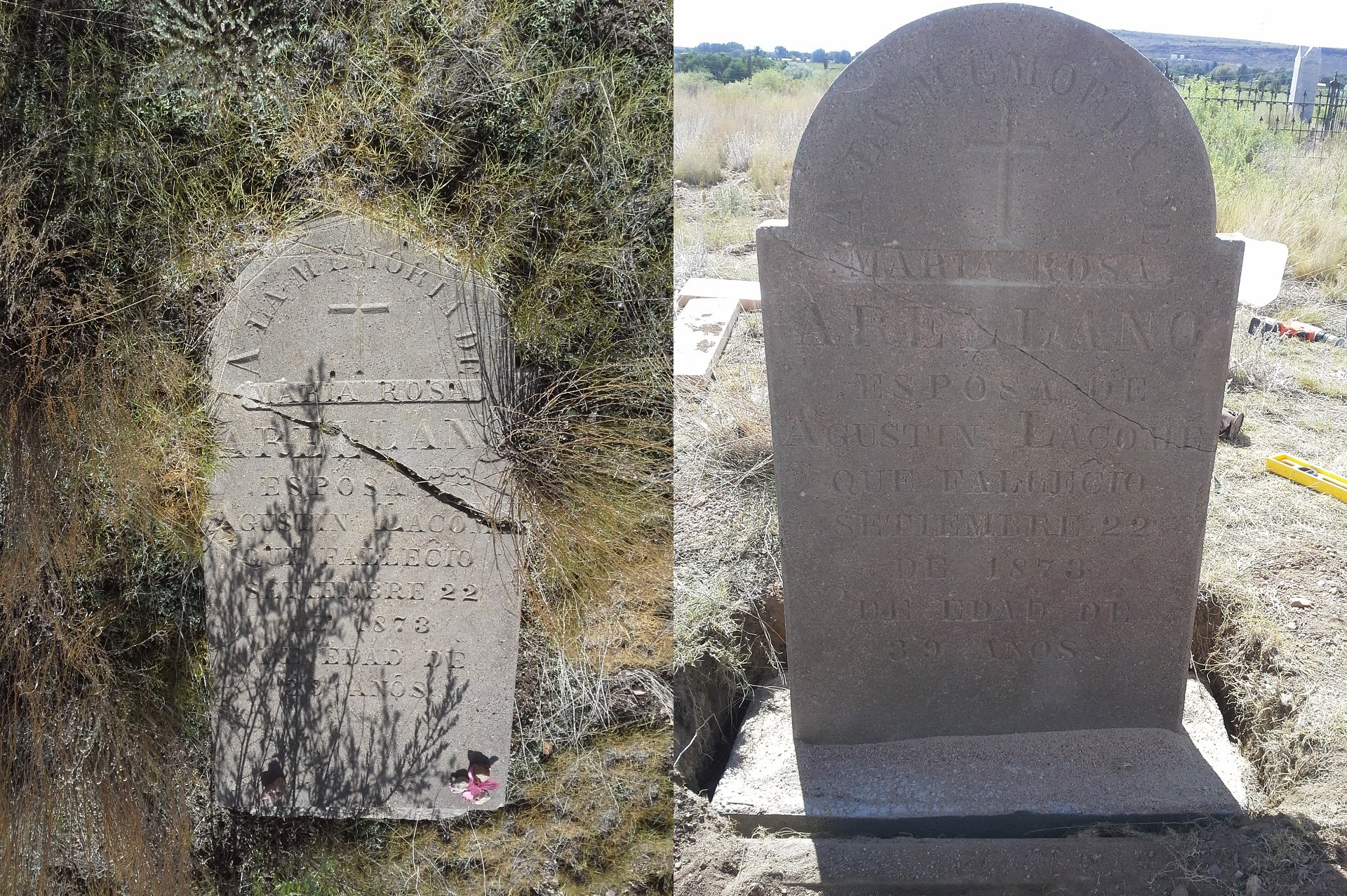
Restoration of Maria Rosa Arellano's San Luis, Colorado, gravestone. Inscription reads, "In memory of Maria Rosa Arellano, wife of Agustin LaCome, who passed away September 22 of 1873 at the age of 39 years".

Auguste married Maria Rosa Arellano April 26, 1855, at Nuestra Señora de Los Dolores in Arroyo Hondo. Maria Rosa was born in 1833 in the Mexican territory of Santa Fe de Nuevo México before the Mexican Cession of the Mexican–American War. Her grandmother was known as "Josefa la Apache". She died while the LaCome family lived in San Luis, Colorado.

==== Children of Auguste and Maria Rosa ====
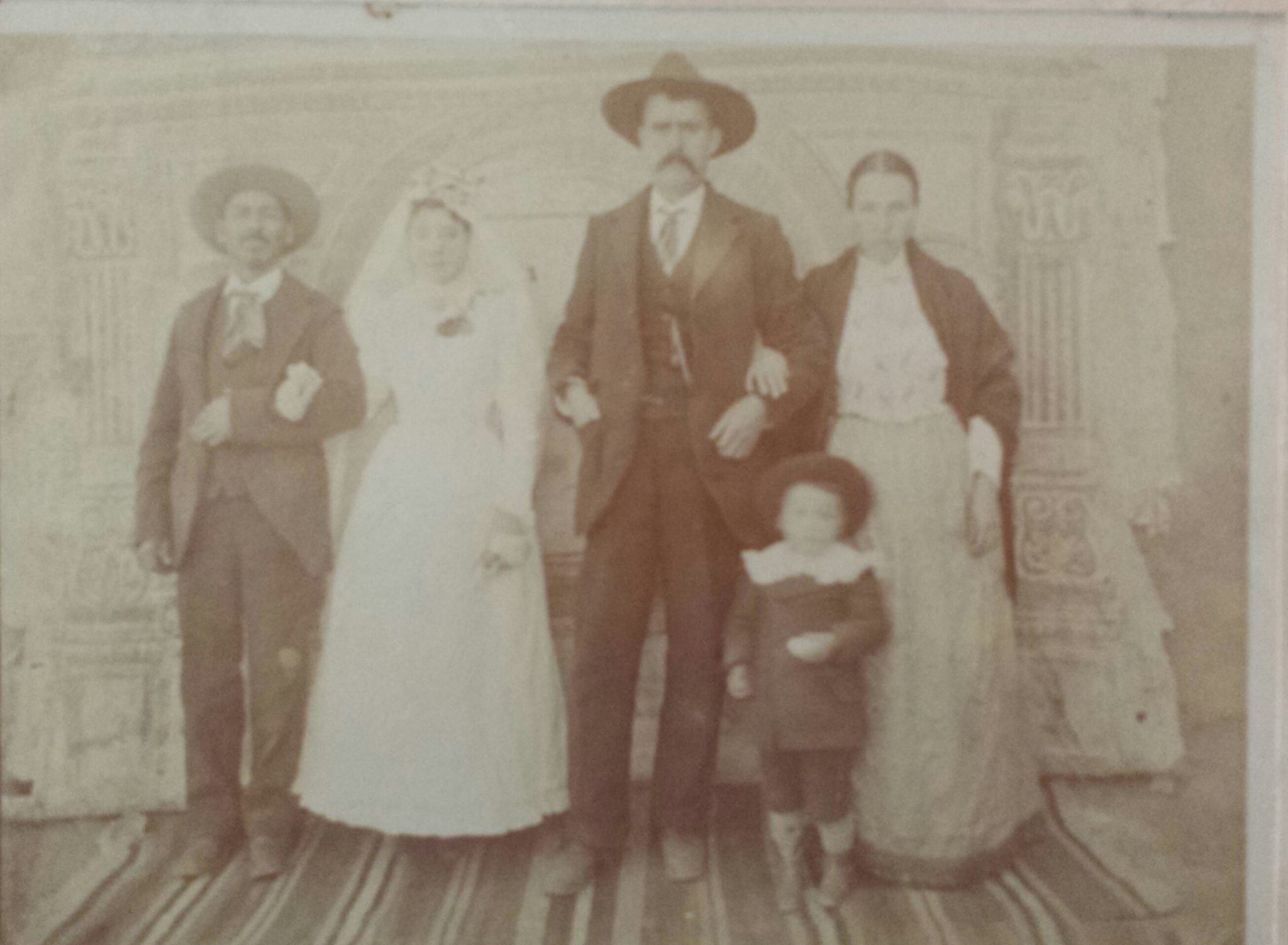
Juan Maria LaCome, second from right and wife, Rumalita LaForet, at far right. Juan Maria and Rumalita's young son, José Augustin, is also pictured.

- José Eulogia (March 16, 1856 – died May 23, 1918)
- Gabriel Augustin (February 2, 1858 – ??)
- Silvestre Augustin (August 22, 1859 – March 3, 1929)
- Juan Bautista (April 6, 1862 – ??)
- Juana Josefa (adopted Navajo girl baptized at 6 years old in 1862)
- Pedro Antonio (adopted Navajo boy baptized at 12 years old in 1863)
- Juan Maria (November 4, 1866 – September 28, 1898)

==== Juan Bautista ====
Baptismal records note the brothers Auguste and Juan Bautista (Jean Baptiste) adopted José Pedro, a 3 year old Southern Paiute boy. José Pedro was baptized on May 10, 1852, with Juan Bautista and his wife, Maria Dolores Alire, standing as godparents. The boy was originally purchased as a captive by Cura José Thomas de Jesus Abeita.

Juan Bautista was murdered later that month on May 28, 1852. Jean Latour was sought for the crime. Records list his wife and children living with Auguste and Maria Rosa.

==== Children of Juan Bautista and Maria Dolores ====
- Francisco Agustin
- Juan Bautista

== Trading career ==
=== Ute missions ===
In February 1850, James S. Calhoun, Indian Agent, and later first Territorial Governor of New Mexico, granted LaCome a license to trade with the Ute nation so long as he did not trade lead, weapons, or other war items. Based on the recommendation of Manuel Alvarez and William S. Messery, Calhoun charged LaCome to search for survivors of the White massacre and ascertain whether they could be ransomed.

LaCome met with peaceful chiefs of the Ute Nation who reaffirmed their peaceful relations with the United States. They confirmed that the child had been taken by a band of Jicarilla Apache and killed shortly after Grier and Carson's attack on their camp, with her body thrown in a river. The servant was killed a short time later, being unable to keep up with the band. He returned his report a few weeks later on March 16, 1850.

Based on a rumor that the child was still alive, Calhoun charged LaCome to follow up his previous mission in July 1850. He traveled with an interpreter and two peons and met up with the Muache band of the Ute. About forty warriors came to meet him, taking his rifle, and divided his trade goods among themselves, valued at about $690 in goods, one horse, and one mule.

This band stated they wanted no peace with the United States. Further, the band had resolved to kill the party with the exception of one of the peons, who was to be allowed to live to inform the governor of their actions. An arrow was shot at LaCome but the interpreter jarred the Ute who held the bow and it missed its mark. After much negotiation the Utes consigned to only give a severe whipping to the interpreter and a peon. LaCome's rifle was returned to him, being too heavy for their use, along with four of his worn out mules, two oxen and two cows.

At the same time as this second mission, an incident at the mercantile at Rio Colorado had a band of Utes arriving with local Mexicans as hostages to intimidate illegal trade. LaCome returned to Rio Colorado after his encounter with the Muache band and, based on these incidents, presented a petition on behalf of citizens of Taos County to Calhoun for a campaign against the Apache. Kit Carson was also a signer of the petition. These rising conflicts foreshadowed the Jicarilla War.

=== Other documented trading ===
In 1852, LaCome took trade items, including knives, tobacco, coffee, lead, sugar, and other goods, loaded on mules to trade with the Navajo at Cañon de Chelly. He returned a month later.

Trading license records specify that he traded with the Navajo at the Canyon de Chelly and that he traded with other Pueblos in addition to the Zuni. They also indicate he lived in San Luis, Colorado, and Rio Colorado, New Mexico, and traded as far as Wyoming and Nebraska.

The Spiegelberg Brothers are listed on several of his licenses as providing the surety bonds required by the territorial government for trade with the Native Americans. Abraham Staab, a prominent Jewish donor for the Cathedral in Santa Fe, is also listed.

A letter in French to Manuel Álvarez, a fellow trader and lieutenant-governor of New Mexico, notes their friendship and business dealings.

The 1860 census of Taos/Arroyo Hondo lists his occupation as a merchant with real estate valued at $2,000 and personal property at $8,000 (approximately $55,500 and $225,000 respectively in 2013 dollars).

A Pueblo Chieftain article dated June 8, 1872, lists LaCome's mercantile as one of three stores in San Luis in addition to a blacksmith, butcher, beer saloon, carpenter, and two hotels.

=== Hawken rifle ===
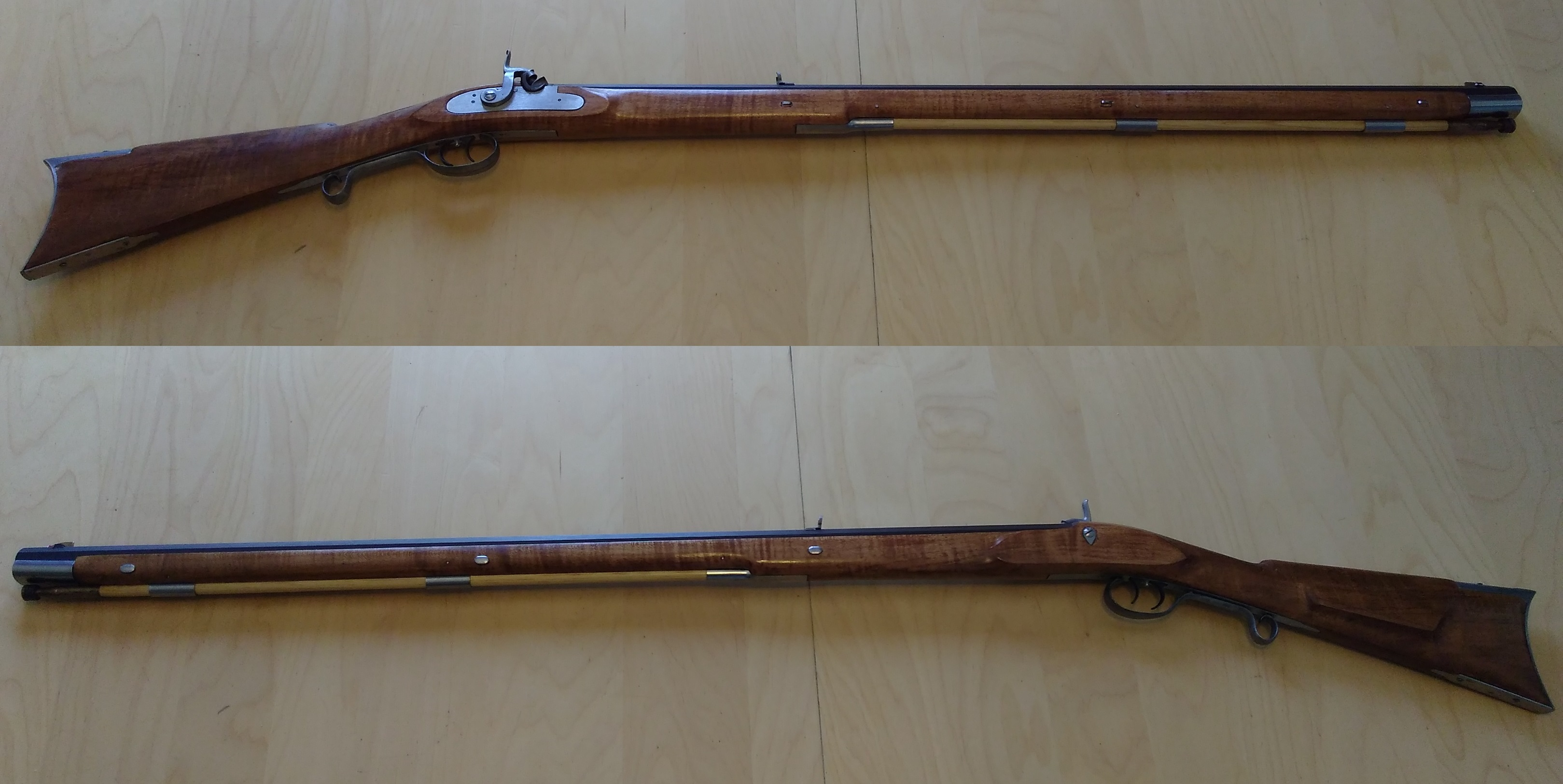
Fullstock replica of LaCome rifle

LaCome's .58 caliber percussion-lock prairie rifle is displayed in the Palace of the Governors museum in Santa Fe, where he is listed as a trader with the Zuni and Navajo. It is a Hawken style with a snail breech and double-set trigger in a scroll guard. The .58 caliber untapered barrel is 36" x 1-1/8", and the rifle is approximately 53" in overall length with a 13-5/8" length of pull.

The rifle was originally a fullstock, but was either damaged and repaired or intentionally cut down to a halfstock length. A custom pewter nose cap on the stock and an oak underrib were added in the modification. The front sight is a copper base with bone blade. The cheekpiece is an earlier square style typically found on flintlocks, rather than the beavertail typical of later percussion locks.

=== Senate run ===
In 1876 Colorado held its first state elections. At age 55, LaCome ran against William H. Meyer for State Senate in Costilla County, 18th District. Meyer would later become the lieutenant governor of Colorado. Votes cast for "Locome" and "Lacompte" were included in the count for LaCome. Meyer carried the election 349–204.

== Death and legacy ==
LaCome died on November 11, 1888, and was buried beneath the floor of Nuestra Señora de los Dolores church in Arroyo Hondo.

LaCome's son, José Eulogio, inherited the mercantile and went on to serve as a sheriff and New Mexico state legislator, as well as owning a saloon and hotel and silver and gold mines. Sylvestre Augustin built a house in Arroyo Hondo that still stands on LaCome Road.

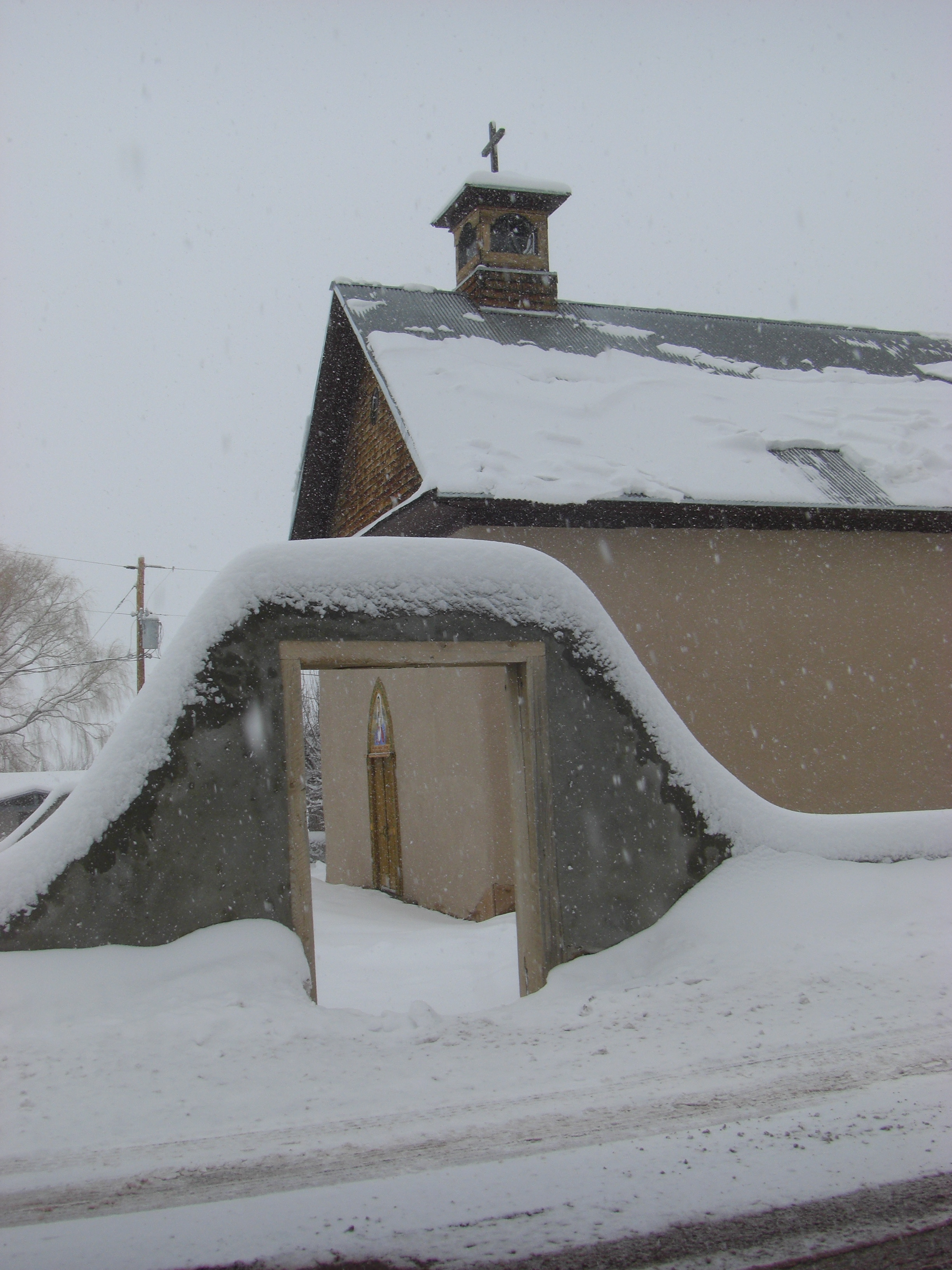
Arroyo Hondo church

== See also ==
- Kit Carson
- White massacre
