= Crumbled House =

- Location within New Mexico
- 36.246073°N 108.832296°W
- Location: San Juan County, New Mexico, USA

Site notes
- Architectural style: Ancient Puebloan
- Governing body: National Park Service

Crumbled House is a ruined great house of the Ancestral Puebloans, just east of the Chuska Mountains, in New Mexico. Based on ceramic dating, the buildings were built and occupied between 1100 and 1250 AD. Crumbled House is a Chaco Protection Site, or special management area.

== Location ==
Crumbled House is located within the boundary of the Navajo Nation in the northwestern part of the state of New Mexico. Crumbled House lay at the extreme west end of the Chaco Canyon influence area and 72 kilometres (45 mi) west of central Chaco Canyon proper. The site also exists in a line of sight configuration leading southeast toward Kin Kletso. The site is located about 104 kilometres (65 mi) south of Mesa Verde, at an average elevation of about 1,790 metres (5,870 ft) above sea level. The site is about 3 kilometres (1.9 mi) southwest of the Chuska Mountains, from which the builders obtained construction timber. It lies on the Chuska Slope, sometimes called the Chuska Valley, which forms the eastern footslope of the Chuska range.

== Structure and site plan ==
Crumbled House is a fortification type structure that utilizes the natural defenses around a tabletop mesa. The site has two room blocks and three major segments that begin at the top of the mesa, and descend the talus west slope and the plateau east slope via the use of stairways.

The mesa top segment formed a triangular upper block. There were massive circular towers at each tip of the triangular structure; high stone walls followed the edges of the mesa. Its layout led to the upper segment being referred to as the "Castle of the Chuskas". The upper segment is 30 metres (98 ft) above the floor of the surrounding valley. One side is about 47 metres (154 ft) long and the other two faces about 81 metres (266 ft) long. There may have been about eighty ground floor rooms in this block, twenty-five rooms on the second story and fourteen subterranean kivas. The masonry walls are made of sandstone cobbles collected from the talus slope.

The second segment and a major defensive feature is the eastern moat. The wide moat separated the mesa from the open plateau along with a strong wall incorporated on the northeastern face completing a ribbon of defense against access from the plateau approach.

The third segment and second room block of Crumbled House is about 21 metres (69 ft) to the south of the castle on a steep talus slope, stepping down about 20 metres (66 ft) in five or six terraces. It is no more than 55 metres (180 ft) by 60 metres (200 ft) in size, containing about 150 rectangular rooms and sixteen round kivas. The lower house is built from dark sandstone rocks collected from the talus slope to the west. Based on ceramic and architectural criteria, the great house was occupied between 1150 and 1250, and the compound between 1250 and 1300. Crumbled House's rock masonry style and keyhole shaped kivas suggest a relation to Mesa Verde masonry traditions.

== Artifacts ==
The people of this community appear to have been closer in culture to the people of the Mesa Verde than to those of Chaco Canyon. The Crumbled House Black-on-white pottery of the Chuska tradition is similar to Mesa Verde Black-on-white, which was made between 1180 and 1300 AD, although not identical. Crumbled House Black on white has been found at 35% of sites where Mesa Verde Corrugated has been found, and at 20% of sites where Mancos Black-on-white was found. Almost 20% of the chipped stone found at Crumbled House is Narbona Pass chert, from a quarry of the top of the Chuska mountains.
