= Todacheene Lake =

Lake in San Juan County, New Mexico, United States

- Location within New Mexico Location within the United States
- Location: San Juan County, New Mexico
- Coordinates: 36.09488°N 108.88492°W
- Basin countries: United States
- Surface area: 4 acres (1.6 ha)
- Surface elevation: 2,672 metres (8,766 ft)

Todacheene Lake (Navajo: tó dích'íi'nii, meaning "bitter water") is a small lake in the crater of the Narbona Pass volcano, in San Juan County, New Mexico, within the Navajo Nation.

The lake has been stocked with rainbow trout. Todacheene Lake and Aspen, Berland and Toadlena lakes are designated for recreational use in the Shiprock area. There is a relatively easy cross-country ski trail along an old dirt road in the crater from BIA32 to Todacheene Lake, a 3 miles (4.8 km) round trip with a vertical gain of 200 feet (61 m). The nearest populated place is Crystal, New Mexico, about 6.5 miles (10.5 km) from the lake to the west of the pass.
