= José Antonio Laureano de Zubiría =

José Antonio Laureano de Zubiría y Escalante
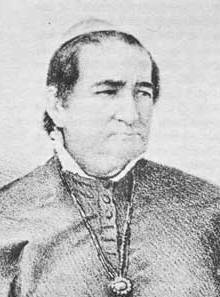
- Diocese: Durango
- Appointed: 28 February 1831
- Installed: 2 October 1831
- Term ended: 28 November 1863
- Predecessor: Juan Francisco Castañiza Larrea y Gonzalez de Agüero
- Successor: José Vicente Salinas e Infanzón

Personal details
- Born: 4 July 1791
- Died: November 28, 1863 (aged 72)
- Denomination: Catholic

José Antonio Laureano de Zubiría y Escalante (4 July 1791 – 28 November 1863) was Bishop of Durango in Mexico from 28 August 1831 until his death. He was a supporter of the Centralist Republic of Mexico, and was strongly opposed to the United States, which took control of the northern part of his diocese in 1846, due to its tolerance of faiths other than Catholicism.

== Early life and views ==
José Antonio Laureano de Zubiría y Escalante was born on 4 July 1791. He was ordained around 1817. Zubiría taught at the seminary of Durango, and many of his pupils went on to become secular priests in New Mexico, including padre Antonio José Martinez of Taos, Manuel Gallegos of Albuquerque and vicar Juan Felipe Ortiz of Santa Fe. Secular priests differ from ordained priests in that they do not belong to religious orders. On 19 October 1830 he was appointed Titular Bishop of Daulia. He was appointed Bishop of Durango on 28 February 1831, ordained on 28 Aug 1831 and installed on 2 October 1831.

Bishop Zubiría was well known for his hostility to the United States. He may have passed on some of his views to Ramón Ortiz y Miera, who came to study under him in Durango in 1832, and later was repatriate commissioner after the Mexican-American War. Bishop Zuberia opposed the growing influence of the invading United States in the north of his diocese.

== First visit to New Mexico ==
Bishop Zubiria first visited New Mexico, an area that is now the Roman Catholic Archdiocese of Santa Fe, in the summer of 1833, travelling with a chaplain, a secretary and a guard. He was the first bishop to have visited the region for seventy two years. His visit to all parts of the territory was made with great ceremony, with the bishop dressed in his full regalia. A (Protestant) observer said of his visit to Santa Fe,

...the streets were swept, the roads and bridges on the route repaired and decorated; and from every window in the city there hung such a profusion of fancy curtains and rich cloths that the imagination was carried back to those glowing descriptions of enchanted worlds which one reads of in the fables of necromancers.

When he visited San Miguel del Vado during this trip he found that the church was in very poor physical condition, and the finances were totally confused. His secretary noted that "With much grief and sorrow, he has observed that this parish church lacks even the most essential things for the celebration of the divine mysteries." In Taos he said of the local images and saints that "they are so deformed that they are not suitable for heavenly adoration." In Santa Cruz de la Cañada he spoke out strongly against the Penitente brotherhood for their excesses, and said they were illegal.

He urged the priests to make greater efforts to baptize Pueblo children, and to bring the Pueblos into the church. He found that the Pueblo Indians had made their own version of the Catholic faith in which Jesus Christ was just one god among several, and the purpose of the Christmas and Holy week ceremonies was in part to ensure good harvests. The Bishop concluded that only the children of the Pueblos would reach salvation.

== Support of centralism ==
Bishop Zubiria was a supporter of centralism in the Mexican Republic, and in 1833 for a period was forced to go into hiding from opponents of this movement. In September 1834 he wrote to Colonel Blas de Hinojos, the military commander of New Mexico, praising him for his decision to support the centralist Plan of Cuernavaca. When there was a rebellion against governor Albino Pérez of New Mexico in 1837, he instructed all the priests to make every effort to support the established order.

== Later visits to New Mexico ==
Bishop Zubiría visited New Mexico again in 1845. On 23 July 1850 Pope Pius IX appointed Jean-Baptiste Lamy vicar apostolic for Santa Fe. The idea of establishing a New Mexico vicarate had been proposed as early as 1630 by Fray Alonso Benavides, due to the distance of 1,500 miles (2,400 km) from Durango. Lamy entered Santa Fe on 9 August 1851, and was welcomed by the Governor of the territory, James S. Calhoun, and many other citizens. However, Juan Felipe Ortiz, who was responsible for administration of the New Mexico church, told Lamy that he and the local clergy remained loyal to Bishop Zubiría, who had visited Santa Fe a few months earlier. Lamy wrote to Bishop Zubiría asking him to explain the change of responsibility to the New Mexico priests, and when his request was unanswered weNovember 13, 1851nt in person to Durango to meet with Bishop Zubiría, showing him the papal document of his appointment. In light of this, Zubiría had to agree to inform the priests of the change.

Bishop Zubiría visited New Mexico again in 1851. He remained Bishop of Durango until his death on 28 November 1863.
