= Beautiful Mountain =

Mountain in New Mexico, United States

- Location within New Mexico

Highest point
- Elevation: 9,392 ft (2,863 m)
- Prominence: 1,508 ft (460 m)
- Listing: San Juan County high point
- Coordinates: 36°29′20″N 108°59′21″W

Geography
- Location: San Juan County, New Mexico, U.S.
- Topo map: USGS Sanostee West

Beautiful Mountain (Navajo: Dziłkʼi Hózhóonii) is part of the Chuska Mountains and its summit is the highest point in San Juan County, New Mexico. The mountain is about 26 miles (42 km) southwest of the community of Shiprock in the Four Corners region. It is on the Navajo Nation and plays a significant role in Navajo mythology.

== History ==
Navajo legend includes "Beautiful Mountain" as the feet of a large mythic male figure, with the Chuska Mountains comprising the body, Chuska Peak as the head and the Carrizo Mountains as the legs. Shiprock is said to be either a medicine pouch or a bow carried by the figure.
