= White massacre =

1849 conflict between settlers and Native Americans

White Massacre
- Part of Santa Fe Trail
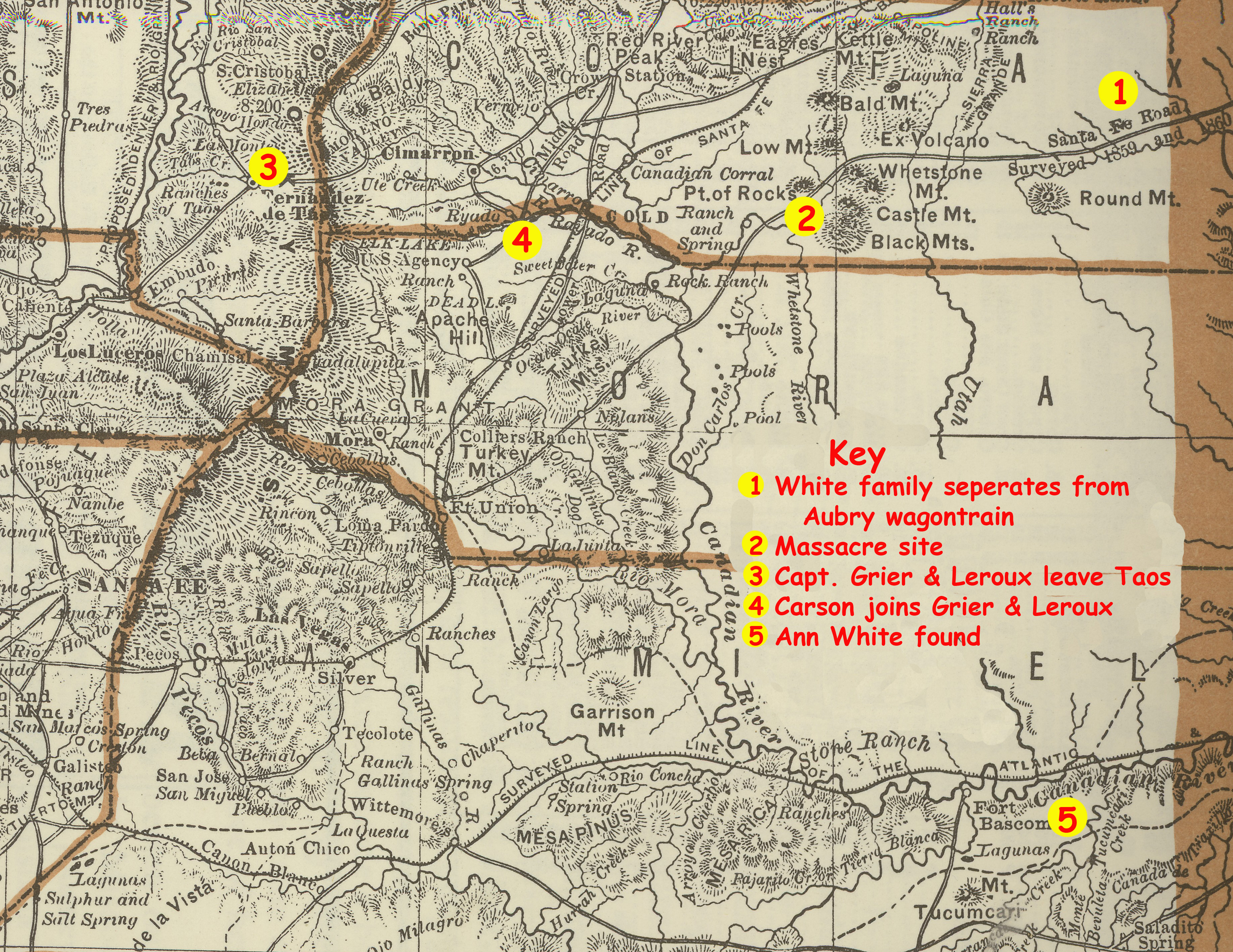
- An 1876 map of northeastern New Mexico with the principal sites plotted.
- Date: October 18, 1849
- Location: New Mexico Territory

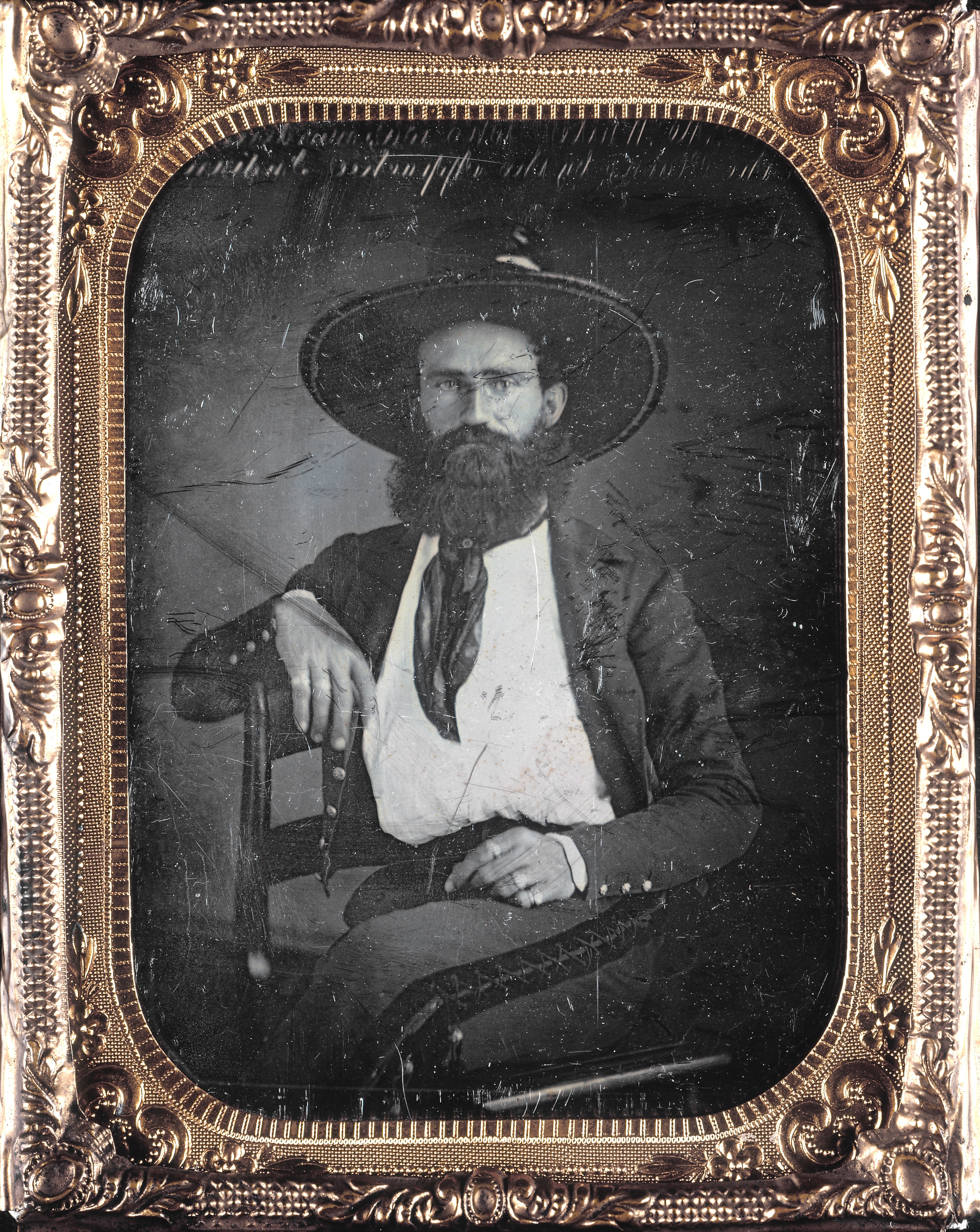
J. M. White, murdered by the Apache Indians.

The White massacre was an engagement between American settlers and a band of Utes and Jicarilla Apaches that occurred in northeastern New Mexico on October 28, 1849. It became notable for the Indians' kidnapping of Mrs. Ann White, who was subsequently killed during an Army rescue attempt a few weeks later.

== Prelude ==
In October, 1849, James White, a merchant who plied his trade between Independence, Missouri, and Santa Fe, New Mexico, was traveling west with a wagon train led by a well-known wagon master, François Xavier Aubry. After the wagon train passed what was considered the dangerous part of the trip, it encamped. White, a veteran of the trail, along with his wife Ann and baby daughter and "negro servant", plus a German named Lawberger and several others, then decided to separate from the train and advance to Santa Fe alone. After a few days of traveling by themselves, they paused at a well-known landmark called the Point of Rocks, between Rock Creek and the Whetstone Branch. (Neither of the two locations can be located on a modern New Mexico map, but the Whetstone can be found on an 1876 map of New Mexico).

== Massacre ==
On October 27, the group was approached by a band of Jicarillas and Utes, who according to the natives' later account, asked for presents. They were driven away from the camp but returned again to ask, and their request received the same response. The third time they returned, they attacked the settlers. All except Ann White, her child, and her servant were killed. Some of the attackers left with their prisoners, while the others hid around what was left of the wagons. Shortly after a group of Mexicans came upon the scene. As they began to pick through what was left of the wagon train, the Apaches and Utes attacked them, killing or driving them away but leaving a wounded Mexican boy. He was eventually discovered by a group of Americans, who first raised the alarm about the massacre. Soldiers arrived at the site and buried the dead, who had, in an unusual turn, not been scalped. When Aubry heard of the murders, he offered a $1,000 reward for the return of Mrs. White.

== Aftermath ==
Word eventually reached the United States Army garrison near Taos. From there, Captain William Grier and the 1st Cavalry were dispatched to try to rescue Mrs. White and to "chastise" the natives. They were accompanied by two experienced guides, Antoine Leroux and Robert Fisher. Along the way, they stopped at Rayado where Kit Carson joined them, eventually leading them to the spot where the attack had occurred. From there, the party pursued the Natives, according to Carson, "for ten or twelve days, the most difficult trail I ever followed."

Finally, the trackers came upon the unsuspecting Natives on the banks of the Canadian River near Tucumcari Butte. Catching them unaware, Carson, who was in the lead, moved towards the camp, motioning the others to follow. In his autobiography, Carson describes what followed: "I was in advance, starting for their camp, calling for the men to follow. The [commanding] officer called a halt, none of them would follow me. I was informed that Leroux, the principle guide, told the officer in command, to halt, that the Indians wanted to have a parley. The Jicarillas started packing their goods for flight and a shot was fired that struck Captain Grier, causing no serious injury. (because Grier had a pair of heavy gauntlets tucked in his jacket) The captain ordered a charge, but the delay allowed all but one of the Indians to escape. In about 200 yards, pursuing the Indians, the body of Mrs. White was found, perfectly warm, had not been killed more than five minutes - shot through the heart by an arrow.... I am certain that if the Indians had been charged immediately on our arrival she would have been saved."

Ann White's daughter and servant were never found. In February 1850, the superintendent of Indian affairs in New Mexico, James S. Calhoun, sent Auguste LaCome, a noted scout, trader, and mountaineer, and Encarnacion Garcia, also a trader, to inquire into their location and whether they could be ransomed. LaCome met with Utes affiliated with the Jicarilla Apache and confirmed that the child had been killed shortly after the attack on the camp and her body thrown in a river. The servant was killed a short time later, being unable to keep up with the band.
