= Blas de Hinojos =

Blas de Hinojos was a military commander of New Mexico who was killed by a force of Navajo warriors led by Narbona in 1835.

Capitan Blas de Hinojos married Maria de Jesus Trujillo. His men were poorly paid. In 1834 he received a complaint from the detachment at San Miguel del Bado that they were not able to support themselves or their families. In 1834 he decided to commit his troops to supporting the centralist Plan of Cuernavaca, and received an effusive letter from José Antonio Laureano de Zubiría, Bishop of Durango, praising his decision.

Hinojos led a slaving expedition into Navajo country between 13 October and 17 November 1834, killing sixteen warriors but taking only three captives. On 8 February 1835 Hinojos left Santa Fé on a second slaving expedition with a force of almost 1,000 armed men. Narbona heard news of the invasion and collected 250 of the best warriors, who made for the 8,000 feet (2,400 m) high Beesh Lichii'l Bigiizh, or Copper Pass, in the Chuska Mountains on the route that the Mexicans were sure to take. The Mexican force, although large, was composed of poorly disciplined and inexperienced men who took no precautions. On 28 February 1835 they straggled into Copper Pass.

Narbona held back his forces, who hiding on both sides of the pass. He told them that when the time was right and not before they would cut the long file of men into small pieces, like cutting a long tree trunk into firewood. When the signal was given, the Navajos poured arrows into the column, those who had guns fired, and some threw stones or rolled rocks into the gorge. Taken completely by surprise, both men and horses panicked and were routed. Hinojos and most of his force died. The survivors made their way beck to Santa Fe, returning on 13 March 1835. Hinojos was succeeded by Albino Pérez. The pass was later renamed Washington Pass, after Colonel John M. Washington, who killed Narbona in 1849. Today it is called Narbona Pass.
