= Chuska Mountains =

Mountain range in Arizona and New Mexico, US

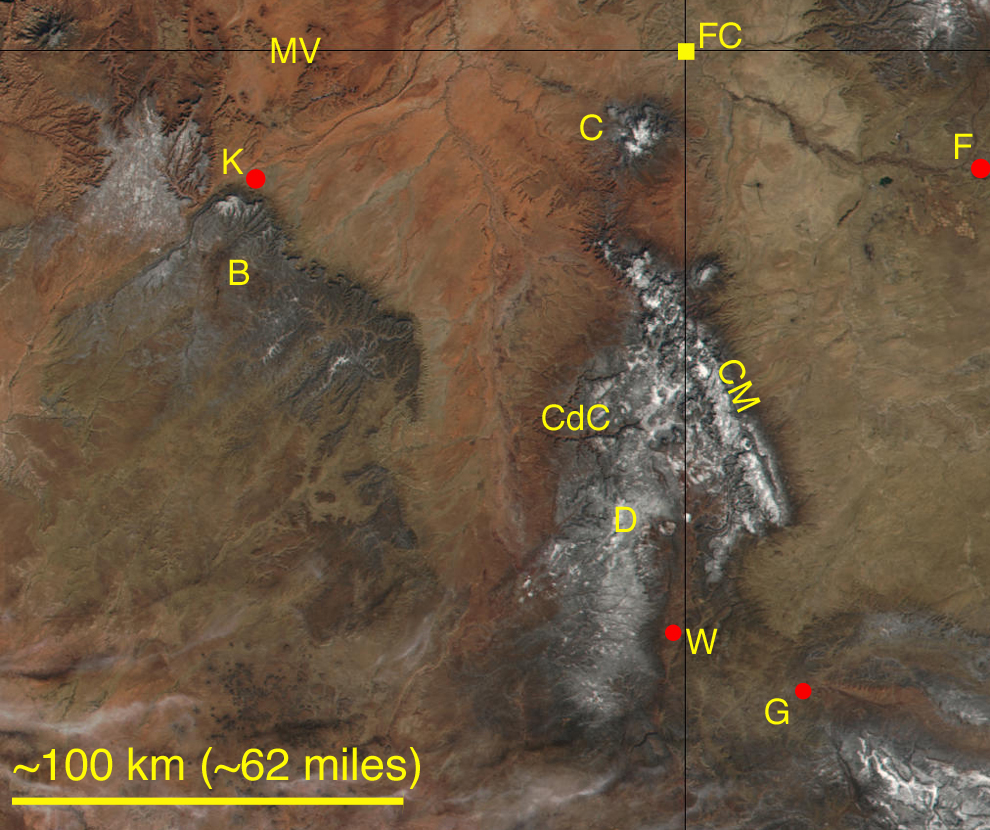
Satellite image of northeastern Arizona and northwestern New Mexico, including the Four Corners Monument (FC). Snow dusts higher elevations in the image. Labeled natural features are the Chuska Mountains (CM), the Carrizo Mountains (C), Monument Valley Navajo Tribal Park (MV), Black Mesa (B), Canyon de Chelly National Monument (CdC), and the Defiance Uplift-(Plateau) (D). Labeled towns are Farmington, New Mexico (F), Gallup, New Mexico (G), Window Rock, Arizona (W), and Kayenta, Arizona (K).

The Chuska Mountains (Navajo: Chʼóshgai) are an elongate range on the southwest Colorado Plateau and within the Navajo Nation whose highest elevations approach 10,000 feet. The range is about 80 by 15 km (50 by 10 miles). It trends north-northwest and is crossed by the state line between Arizona and New Mexico. The highlands are a dissected plateau, with an average elevation of about 2,740 m (8,990 ft), and subdued topography. The highest point is Roof Butte (36.4601° N, 109.0929° W) at 2,994 m (9,823 ft), near the northern end of the range in Arizona. Other high points include the satellite Beautiful Mountain at 2,861 m (9,386 ft) and Lukachukai Mountains at 2,885 m (9,465 ft), both also near the northern end, and Matthews Peak at 2,911 m (9,551 ft). The San Juan Basin borders the Chuskas on the east, and typical elevations in nearby parts of that basin are near 1,800 m (5,900 ft). The eastern escarpment of the mountains is marked by slumps and landslides that extend out onto the western margin of the San Juan Basin. To the north, the Chuska's are separated from the Carrizo Mountains by Red Rock Valley, which is today commonly referred to as Red Valley, the Chuska and Carrizo ranges nearly connect with the San Juan range of the Rocky Mountains in southwest Colorado.

== Peaks ==
Major peaks of the Chuskas include:

Rank	Peak Name	Elevation (Feet)	Elevation (Meters)	Subrange
1	Roof Butte	9,823 ft	2,994 m	
2	Peak 9778	9,778 ft	2,980 m	
3	Peak 9566	9,566 ft	2,916 m	
4	Matthews Peak	9,550 ft	2,911 m	Tunitcha Mountains
5	Lukachukai Mountains HP	9,466 ft	2,885 m	Lukachukai Mountains
6	Lukachukai BM	9,416 ft	2,870 m	Lukachukai Mountains
7	Bear BM	9,396 ft	2,864 m	
8	Beautiful Mountain	9,388 ft	2,861 m	
9	Washington Pass BM	9,370 ft	2,856 m	
10	Peak 9280	9,280 ft	2,829 m	

== Reservation ==
Much of the range is Navajo Nation Forest; ponderosa pine, spruce, and fir are among the important tree varieties. The Ponderosa Pine (Pinus ponderosa), is known variously as the “tree of life,” “world tree”, “rooted tree”, and the “lonesome pine” there were cut and transported more than 75 km (about 50 miles) to the east to construct pueblos in Chaco Culture National Historical Park in the San Juan Basin as early as 974 A.D. It is depicted by the National Park Service as a majestic lone pine standing in the west plaza of Pueblo Bonito, Chaco Canyon. Following a period of contentious debate, logging in the Chuskas was suspended in 1994. There has been discussion among the tribal government about resuming logging at some future time.

The forests of the Chuska Mountains and of the Defiance Uplift receive higher rainfall than the surrounding lowlands, and these highlands typically receive regular winter snowfall. Runoff from snowmelt and seasonal thunderstorms along the crest of the Chuskas generates more than half the surface water of the Navajo Nation. Canyons of Canyon de Chelly National Monument were cut by streams with headwaters in the Chuskas.The most significant wildfire recorded in recent history is the Asaayi Lake Fire, which scorched around 15,000 acres over a span of several days in mid-June 2014. In contrast to past wildfires, its notable characteristic was the intensity of its impact, with almost one-third of the impacted region undergoing severe fire conditions that led to considerable tree loss.

The Chuska Mountains are sparsely populated. Nearby communities are small, including Crystal, New Mexico and Lukachukai, Arizona. The Two Grey Hills Trading Post on the eastern side of the Chuska Mountains was established in 1897 (about 10 km east of Toadlena), features one hundred years of Navajo Textile, associated with distinctive patterns used in Navajo rugs. A paved road, New Mexico State Road 134, crosses the range through Narbona Pass. Narbona Pass was originally called Beesh Lichii'l Bigiizh (English: Copper Pass), and was the location where Navajo warriors led by Narbona decisively defeated a Mexican slaving expedition under Captain Blas de Hinojos. After the United States had taken control of New Mexico from the Mexican Army, it was renamed Washington Pass, after Colonel John M. Washington, who commanded a military expedition against the Navajo. Narbona was a Navajo headman killed in an encounter with Washington's troops in 1849.

== Geology ==
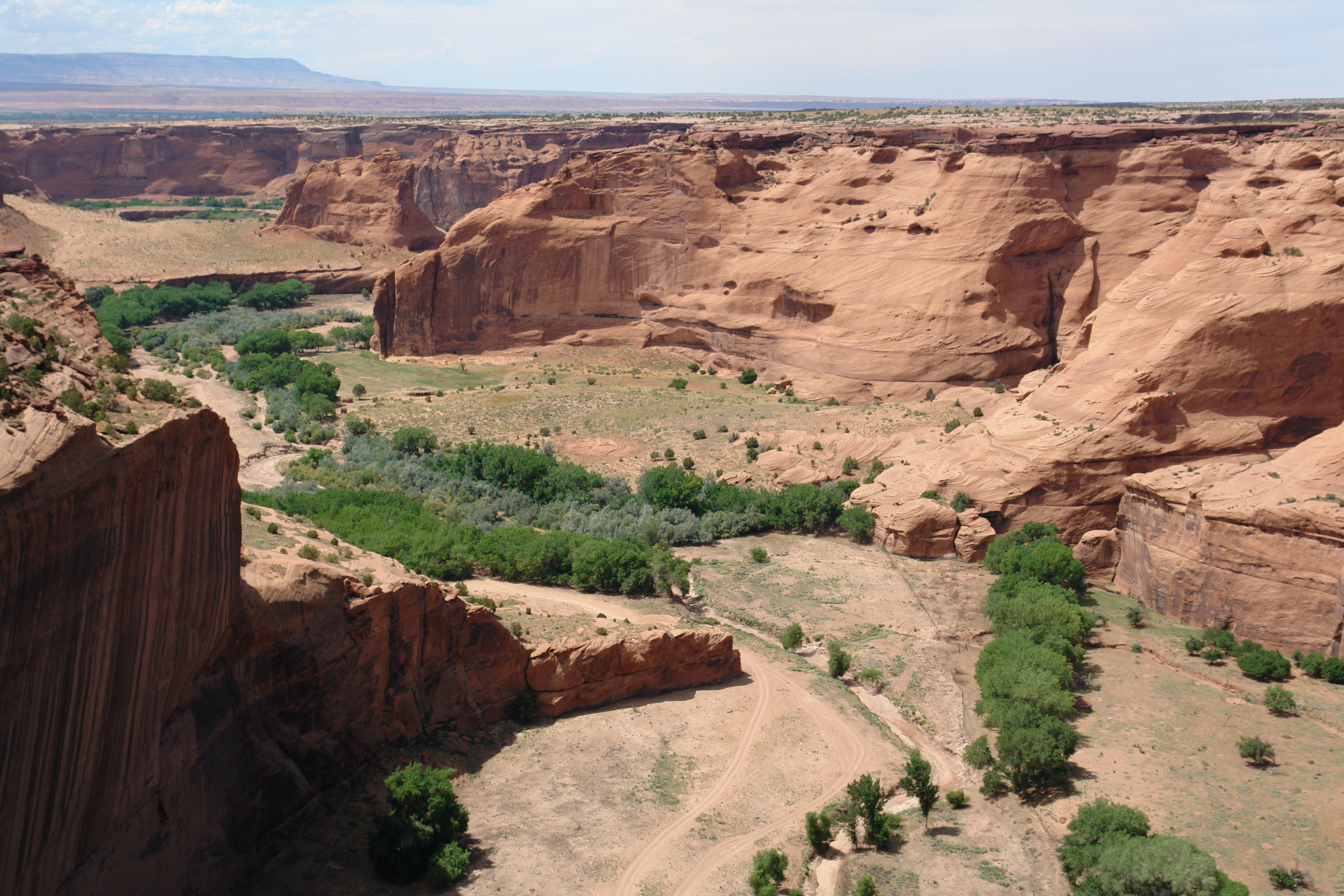
View westward from upper Canyon de Chelly, (from White House Ruin), with Black Mesa on the horizon.

The Chuska Mountains and the Defiance Uplift immediately to the southwest form one of the prominent uplifted highlands of the Colorado Plateau. The uplifted region is separated from the San Juan Basin to the east by the Defiance and associated monoclines. Relative uplift, basin subsidence, and monocline formation began in the early stages of the Laramide orogeny about 75 to 80 million years ago. Although the Chuska Mountains can be considered part of the Defiance Uplift, they stand higher. They are capped by an erosional remnant of Chuska Sandstone, a unit locally more than 500 meters thick. The flat-lying Chuska Sandstone rests unconformably on Mesozoic rocks deformed in the Defiance monocline. Biotite in layers of altered volcanic ash within the Chuska Sandstone has yielded radiometric ages of 35 and 33 million years by argon-argon dating. The Chuska Sandstone is formed of sand dune deposits, and it appears to be a remnant of a huge Oligocene sand sea, the Chuska erg. The erg hypothesis is consistent with major exhumation of the central Colorado Plateau in the late Oligocene and early Miocene (e.g., from about 26 to 16 million years ago). If so, then major uplift of the central Colorado Plateau may postdate the Laramide orogeny.

Minette of the Navajo Volcanic Field intruded and was extruded through the Chuska Sandstone. Minette makes up the two highest points: Roof Butte and Matthews Peak. A maar complex, containing pyroclastic and extrusive minette, is exposed along New Mexico Highway 134 in Narbona Pass (Brand et al., 2008). Argon-argon dating of four minette samples at Narbona Pass yielded consistent ages of 25 million years. Very little oil has been produced in Arizona, and much of that production has come from a minette sill, the reservoir rock of the Dineh-bi-Keyah field in the northwestern Chuska Mountains near Roof Butte. The sill is intruded into lower Pennsylvanian sedimentary rocks. The producing rock is both porous and fractured, and it is characterized by large poikilitic sanidine grains with inclusions of diopsidic augite and biotite: potassium-argon dating of the biotite yielded 25.7 million years. This pulse of magmatism at about 25 million years may have been accompanied by uplift of the Defiance-Chuska high in addition to the uplift during the Laramide orogeny.

Helium-rich gas has been extracted from Devonian strata in the Dineh-bi-Keyah field. Additional economic resources have included uranium, mined from some of the Mesozoic strata, particularly from the Morrison Formation in the Lukachukai Mountains at the northwest end of the Chuska Mountains.

== See also ==
- Chuska Valley

== General references ==
- Lucas, Spencer G., Semken, Steven C., Berglof, William R., and Dana S. Ulmer-Scholle (editors), Geology of the Zuni Plateau, New Mexico Geological Society Fifty-fourth Annual Field Conference, 424 p., 2003.
- Brand, B. D., Clarke, A. B., and Semken, S., 2008, Eruptive conditions and depositional processes of Narbona Pass Maar volcano, Navajo volcanic field, Navajo Nation, New Mexico (USA). Bulletin Volcanol. doi:10.1007/s00445-008-0209-y
- Steven M. Cather, Lisa Peters, Nelia W. Dunbar, and William C. McIntosh, Genetic Stratigraphy, Provenance, and New Age Constraints for the Chuska Sandstone (Upper Eocene-Lower Oligocene), New Mexico–Arizona. in Lucas et al., cited above, pp. 397–412.
- Steven M. Cather, The Chuska erg: Paleogeomorphic and Paleoclimatic implications of an Oligocene sand sea on the Colorado Plateau, Four Corners Geological Society News Letter, February 2007 (accessed May, 2007), http://www.fourcornersgeologicalsociety.org/
- Steven M. Cather, Sean D. Connell, Richard M. Chamberlin, William C. McIntosh, Glen E. Jones, Andre R. Potochnik, Spencer G. Lucas, and Peggy S. Johnson, The Chuska erg: Paleogeomorphic and paleoclimatic implications of an Oligocene sand sea on te Colorado Plateau. Geological Society of America Bulletin, v. 120, pp. 3–33, 2008.
- Nathan B. English, Julio L. Betancourt, Jeffrey S. Dean, and Jay Quade, "Strontium isotopes reveal distant sources of architectural timber in Chaco Canyon, New Mexico." Proceedings National Academy of Sciences USA 98, 11891–96, 2001.
