= Chuska Sandstone =

Geologic formation in Arizona and New Mexico

- Stratigraphic range: late Eocene – early Oligocene
- Type: Geological formation
- Overlies: Tohatchi Formation
- Thickness: 535 meters (1,755 ft)

Lithology
- Primary: Sandstone
- Other: Siltstone

Location
- Coordinates: 36.461°N 109.096°W
- Region: Arizona, New Mexico
- Country: United States

Type section
- Named for: Chuska Mountains
- Named by: H.E. Gregory
- Year defined: 1916
- Chuska Sandstone (the United States) Chuska Sandstone (Arizona)

The Oligocene Chuska Sandstone is a geologic formation that crops out in the Chuska Mountains of northeastern Arizona and northwestern New Mexico. The formation is a remnant of a great sand sea, or erg, that once covered an area of 140,000 square kilometres (54,000 sq mi) reaching from the present locations of the Chuska Mountains to near Albuquerque and to the southwest. This erg deposited a succession of sandstone beds exceeded in thickness only by the Navajo Sandstone on the Colorado Plateau.

== Description ==
The Chuska Sandstone is up to 535 meters (1,755 ft) thick and is divided into two members. The Deza Member, to which the lowermost beds of the formation are assigned, is up to 81 meters (266 ft) thick and consists mostly of pale orange to yellow-gray sandstone (66%), claystone (16%) and sandy siltstone (16%). Sedimentary structures are present that indicate deposition by running water, and the member fills shallow paleovalleys eroded in the underlying Mesozoic beds. The Deza Member is not always present, and when present, it grades into the overlying Narbona Pass Member without a sharp contact.

The Narbona Pass Member makes up most of the Chuska Sandstone, and consists of as much as 535 meters (1,755 ft) of wind-deposited (eolian) sandstone. The sandstone is pinkish-gray to yellowish-gray and is crossbedded and arkosic (it contains significant feldspar).

The formation overlies Mesozoic formations across an angular unconformity. The youngest of these is the Tohatchi Formation of the Mesaverde Group. The Chuska Sandstone is in turn overlain by lava flows of the Navajo Volcanic Field. Radiometric dating yields ages of 34.75 ± 0.20 million years for the Deza Member and 33.31 ± 0.25 million years for the lower Narbona Pass Member, and overlying volcanic rock has been dated at 25.05 ± 0.16 million years in age.

== Fossils ==
The only fossils found in the Chuska Sandstone are shell fragments from emydid turtles found in the Deza Member. These cannot be more precisely identified, and so are of little value for dating the Deza Member. However, emydid turtles are almost exclusively aquatic, so the presence of these shell fragments provides supporting evidence that the Deza Member was deposited in an environment with permanent water bodies.

== Chuska erg ==
The formation has been interpreted as an erosional remnant of a large erg (sand sea). Other remnants include sandstone units of the Spears Group on the north flank of the Mogollon-Datil volcanic field and a sandstone unit found only in the deep subsurface in the northwest Albuquerque Basin. Conservative estimates of the original extent of the erg suggest it once covered an area of 140,000 square kilometres (54,000 sq mi). The erg was almost entirely eroded away during the early Miocene.

== History of investigation ==
The formation was named by Herbert E. Gregory in 1917 for exposures in the Chuska Mountains. H.E. Wright restricted the formation to the caprock of the Chuska Mountains, and adjusted the definition of the lower boundary of the Chuska, assigning beds previously included in the lowermost Chuska to his Deza Formation. Repenning, Lance, and Irwin reported in 1958 that the contact between the Deza Formation and Chuska Sandstone was gradational and difficult to map, and concluded that the Deza Formation should be abandoned and its beds included in the Chuska, a conclusion shared by later researchers. However, Spencer G. Lucas and Steven M. Cather assigned the Deza beds to the Deza Member of the Chuska Sandstone.
