= Crystal, New Mexico =

Census-designated place in New Mexico, US

Crystal, New Mexico Tóniłtsʼílí (Navajo)
- Census-designated place
- Location in San Juan County and the state of New Mexico

- Location within New Mexico Location within the United States
- Coordinates: 36°01′44″N 108°59′23″W
- Country: United States
- State: New Mexico
- Counties: San Juan, McKinley

Area
  - Total: 4.57 sq mi (11.83 km^{2})
  - Land: 4.55 sq mi (11.78 km^{2})
  - Water: 0.019 sq mi (0.05 km^{2})
- Elevation: 7,526 ft (2,294 m)

Population (2020)
  - Total: 302
  - Density: 66.4/sq mi (25.63/km^{2})
- Time zone: UTC-7 (Mountain (MST))
  - Summer (DST): UTC-6 (MDT)
- ZIP code: 87328 (Navajo)
- Area code: 505
- FIPS code: 35-19080
- GNIS feature ID: 2407690

Crystal is an unincorporated community and census-designated place (CDP) on the Navajo Nation in San Juan and McKinley counties in New Mexico, United States. The population was 302 at the 2020 census. It is located along the base of the Chuska Mountains, at the western end of Narbona Pass.

The McKinley County portion of Crystal is part of the Gallup Micropolitan Statistical Area, while the San Juan County portion is part of the Farmington Metropolitan Statistical Area. A post office operated at Crystal from 1903 to 1941.

== History ==
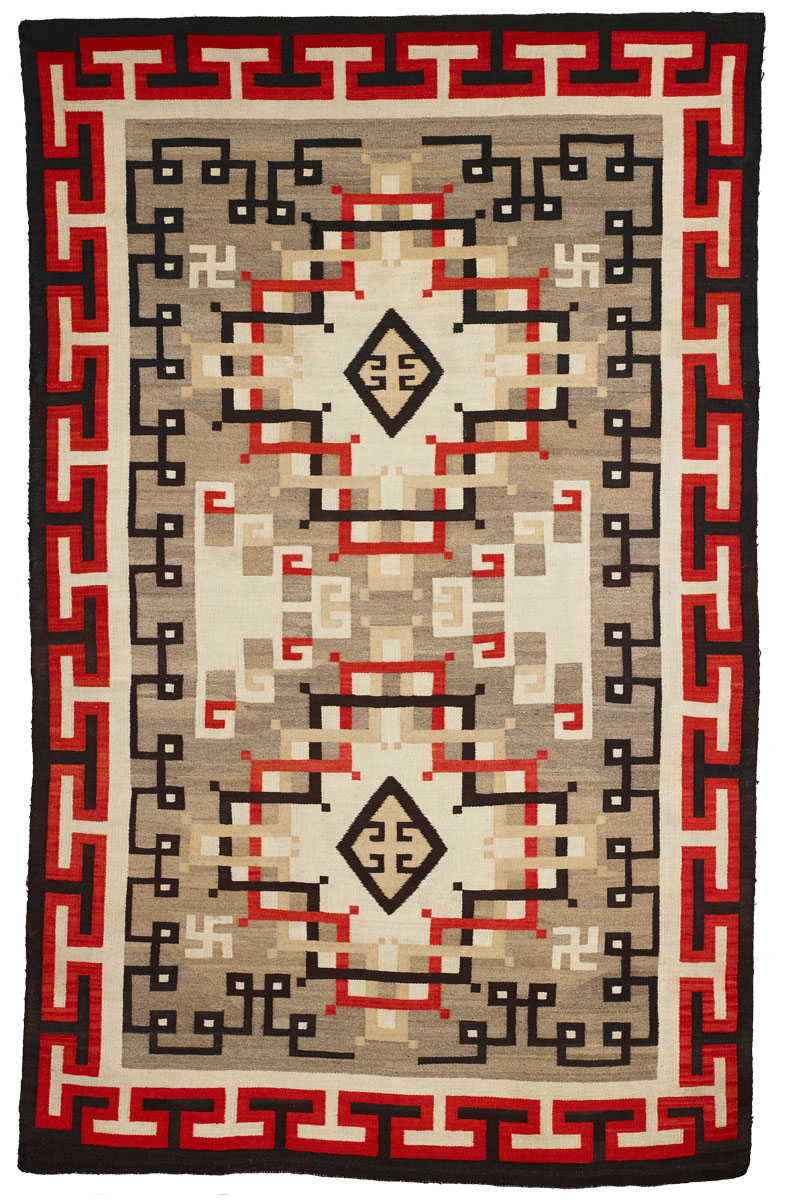
A Navajo wool rug in the Early Crystal style, including whirling log symbols in the design (1900-1920 AD)

The first known trader in the Washington Pass area (now Narbona Pass) was Romulo Martinez, a Spanish-American from Fort Defiance, in 1873. The names of other traders are recorded for the following years, but they seem all to have been temporary, trading from tents in the summer season.

Crystal was founded in 1884 when a trading post was established. Its name likely derives from its Navajo moniker meaning "crystal water flows out."

In 1896 John Bradford Moore arrived, an Irishman from Sheridan, Wyoming. He bought the trading site, then cut timber in the mountains and hauled it down to build a log trading post, which he stocked with supplies carted from the rail head in Gallup. He named his post at the western mouth of Narbona Pass the Crystal Trading Post. During the winter months, he employed Navajo weavers to make rugs. Moore ensured that the wool and the weaving was good quality, and created designs of his own, quickly gaining a reputation as a source of good quality rugs.

Moore understood what the market in the eastern United States would value, and in his catalog stressed the use of natural materials and primitive technology. Despite this, he introduced production-line techniques, and had no problem with using machine-produced yarns with synthetic dyes. Traders in Navajo rugs had to keep costs down to be able to offer competitive prices, so wages were low. Talking of the weaver's life, Moore said, "there is no more dismal wage proposition than her remuneration for her part in the industry. Given any other paying outlet for her labor, there would very soon be no such thing as a blanket industry ... it is her one and only way of earning money."

Moore was succeeded in 1911 by his manager, A. J. Molohon. The Crystal Trading Post was owned by the C.C. Manning company from 1919 to 1922. Later Charlie Newcomb and then Jim Collyer owned the post. In 1944 Don Jenson bought the post, holding it until 1981. Apparently Jenson developed the current Crystal rug.

== Geography ==
Crystal is in southwestern San Juan County, with a small portion extending into the northwest corner of McKinley County. New Mexico State Road 134 has its terminus in Crystal and leads northeast over Narbona Pass 17 miles (27 km) to U.S. Route 491 at Sheep Springs.

According to the U.S. Census Bureau, the Crystal CDP has a total area of 4.57 square miles (11.84 km^{2}), of which 0.02 square miles (0.05 km^{2}), or 0.44%, are water. The community is drained by Crystal Creek, which flows west toward Coyote Wash and Canyon de Chelly.

== Demographics ==
Historical population
Census	Pop.	Note	%±
2000	347		—
2010	311		−10.4%
2020	302		−2.9%
U.S. Decennial Census

Languages (2000)	Percent
Spoke English at home	51.90%
Spoke Navajo at home	48.10%

As of the census of 2000, there were 347 people, 100 households, and 77 families residing in the CDP. The population density was 78.9 inhabitants per square mile (30.5/km^{2}). There were 113 housing units at an average density of 25.7 per square mile (9.9/km^{2}). The racial makeup of the CDP was 97.98% Native American, 1.73% White, and 0.29% from two or more races. Hispanic or Latino of any race were 2.59% of the population.

There were 100 households, out of which 41.0% had children under the age of 18 living with them, 44.0% were married couples living together, 27.0% had a female householder with no husband present, and 23.0% were non-families. 21.0% of all households were made up of individuals, and 8.0% had someone living alone who was 65 years of age or older. The average household size was 3.47 and the average family size was 4.10.

In the CDP, the population was spread out, with 38.0% under the age of 18, 10.4% from 18 to 24, 26.8% from 25 to 44, 17.6% from 45 to 64, and 7.2% who were 65 years of age or older. The median age was 27 years. For every 100 females, there were 74.4 males. For every 100 females age 18 and over, there were 83.8 males.

The median income for a household in the CDP was $24,722, and the median income for a family was $13,906. Males had a median income of $31,023 versus $16,250 for females. The per capita income for the CDP was $7,002. About 54.7% of families and 54.1% of the population were below the poverty line, including 63.8% of those under age 18 and 20.0% of those age 65 or over.

== Education ==
The Bureau of Indian Education (BIE) operates Crystal Boarding School, a K-6 boarding school. It opened in 1935 as part of an effort to replace off-reservation Indian boarding schools with on-reservation boarding schools, as a part of the New Deal project. In 2014 about 30 students boarded but most did not, and only one dormitory was open as another was deemed unsafe. In 2013, 5% of the students were classified as having mathematics skills on par with their grade levels even though the school had already shifted most of its instruction to mathematics and reading at the expense of science and social studies. In 2015 Politico stated that the school's campus was in a poor condition. It had no school counselor.

The portion of Crystal in San Juan County is within the Central Consolidated Schools school district. Gallup-McKinley County Schools is the school district of the McKinley County portion of Crystal. The McKinley County portion is zoned to Navajo Elementary School, Navajo Middle School, and Navajo Pine High School in Navajo.

== See also ==
- List of census-designated places in New Mexico
