= John Munroe =

American politician (c. 1796–1861)

Governor of New Mexico
- In office October 1849 – March 1851
- Preceded by: John M. Washington
- Succeeded by: James S. Calhoun

Personal details
- Born: c. 1796 Scotland
- Died: 26 April 1861 New Brunswick, New Jersey
- Occupation: Soldier
- Known for: Governor of New Mexico

Military service
- Branch/service: US Army
- Years of service: 1814 – 1861
- Rank: Lieutenant Colonel; Brevet Colonel

John Munroe (c. 1796 – 26 April 1861) was an American military officer who was governor of the U.S. provisional government of New Mexico from 1849 to 1851.

== Early career ==
John Munroe was born in Scotland about 1796. He graduated from West Point in 1814, and was assigned to the artillery. He served in the War of 1812 and Seminole Wars. Munroe was chief of artillery under General Zachary Taylor in the Mexican–American War of 1846–1847. During the occupation of Mexico City he became an original member of the Aztec Club of 1847.

By order of 26 May 1849, Brevet Colonel John Munroe was ordered to Santa Fe to relieve Brevet Lieutenant Colonel John M. Washington. Munroe became military governor of New Mexico in October 1849.

== Governor of New Mexico ==
Munroe was out of his depth as governor of New Mexico, and ran into severe administrative problems. New Mexico had been under military rule since it was occupied by the United States in 1846. By 1850, although there were strongly opposed political factions in New Mexico, most were united in opposing the continued military government. Munroe convened a constitutional assembly in May, which ratified a constitution by 6,771 votes to 39. The constitution envisaged New Mexico as being a State. On 18 July 1850 the U.S. Senate received a copy of Munroe's report dated 13 May 1850 telling them that the elections had been held and he was optimistic about the outcome of the convention.

On 7 June 1850 Henry Clay (who had not yet heard of these events) spoke in the Senate on the subject of the Texas territorial claims in New Mexico. Towards the end of his speech he said of Munroe, "... who now holds in his hands perhaps the destinies of Santa Fe and New Mexico. He looks on wholly indifferent, and is neutral in the struggle about to arise of the people of Santa Fe, composed, I understand, of American citizens, Mexicans and Spaniards, this side of the Rio del Norte, and the authorities of Texas. And this neutrality is to be kept by ... the lieutenant colonel, who has the dealing out of civil commissions, acting ... as if he were the Autocrat of the Russias."

The constitution, modelled on other recently formed states, included a clause that prohibited slavery. It was adopted on 20 June 1850, and state officers were elected. Henry Connelly was elected Governor and Manuel Alvarez Lieutenant-governor. Since Connelley was absent in the States, Alvarez assumed the position of Acting Governor. However, Colonel Munroe forbade the assumption of civil power by the elected officials. The result was a deadlock that lasted for several months. On 9 September 1850 the U.S. Senate passed a compromise bill that included an act to organize a government for New Mexico as a territory, and this overrode the state legislature. James S. Calhoun was appointed governor with effect as of 3 March 1851, succeeding John Munroe.

== Later years ==
John Munroe continued serving in the Army until his death on 26 April 1861 in New Brunswick, New Jersey.
