= Manuel Álvarez (trader) =

American politician and trader

- Born: c. 1794; Spain
- Died: 5 July 1856; Santa Fe, New Mexico
- Occupation: Trader
- Known for: Lieutenant-governor of New Mexico

Manuel Álvarez (c. 1794 – 5 July 1856) was a Spanish-born American trader in Santa Fe, who became lieutenant-governor of New Mexico.

== Trader ==
Manuel Álvarez was born in Spain around 1794. In 1818 he left Spain, reaching Mexico in 1819. In 1823 he left Mexico and travelled via Cuba to Missouri, then continued from St. Louis west to Santa Fe, New Mexico, where he opened a store. The Mexican republic had gained independence from Spain during the Mexican War of Independence (1810–1821). In 1829 the Mexican government expelled all Spanish nationals, so Álvarez had to leave New Mexico. For a few years Álvarez was a free trapper in the Rocky Mountain fur trade, then a brigade leader for the American Fur Company, returning to Santa Fe around 1834.

On 21 March 1839 he was appointed United States consul at Santa Fe. He did not receive a formal "exequator" from the government of Mexico, but was informally permitted to act as consul by the governor. He reached Santa Fe in July 1839, finding no seal, flag, coat of arms or other normal consular equipment when he arrived. The Texan Santa Fe Expedition of 1841, which the Mexicans saw as a military invasion, created a crisis in Santa Fe. The local American merchants were subject to popular and official attacks. When the expedition approached Santa Fe, Alvares asked Governor Manuel Armijo for permission to go out and talk with the leader, but was refused. Alvarez later was wounded and narrowly escaped death from an angry crowd. This crisis blew over, and Álvarez served as acting consul until the U.S. occupation in 1846.

Álvarez's store became one of the largest in New Mexico. He was a resourceful individual, "an artful dodger and a pragmatist of the highest order", and became a wealthy and influential member of Santa Fe society both before and after the U.S. took control. He was critical of the Mexican government but a friend of the Mexicans, although he said of them, "They were too gullible, especially to the polished chicanery of American Merchants."

Based on a letter from the Auguste Lacome, Auguste Lacome to Álvarez, French was among the languages he spoke.

== U.S. politician ==
On 18 March 1846 Álvarez was appointed the commercial agent of the United States at Santa Fe, receiving his commission after General Stephen W. Kearny entered the city on 15 August 1846 and took control of New Mexico for the United States. After the Treaty of Guadalupe Hidalgo had been signed in February 1848, Álvarez strongly supported admitting New Mexico into the union as a state.

On 20 June 1850 a popular vote ratified the New Mexico "state" constitution, and Álvarez was elected lieutenant-governor of New Mexico. For a period he was acting Governor while Governor Henry Connelly was absent. However, the military Governor John Munroe forbade the assumption of civil power by the elected officials. The result was a deadlock that lasted for several months. On 9 September 1850 the U.S. Senate passed a compromise bill that included an act to organize a government for New Mexico as a territory, and this overrode the state legislature. James S. Calhoun was appointed governor with effect as of 3 March 1851, succeeding John Munroe. Álvarez served as an official in the territorial government until his death.

He died at Santa Fe on 5 July 1856.

== See also ==
- Auguste Lacome
