= Ordizan =

- Commune
- Coat of arms
- Location of Ordizan
- Location within France Location within Occitanie
- Coordinates: 43°06′32″N 0°07′52″E
- Country: France
- Region: Occitania
- Department: Hautes-Pyrénées
- Arrondissement: Bagnères-de-Bigorre
- Canton: La Haute-Bigorre
- Intercommunality: CC de la Haute-Bigorre

Government
  - Mayor (2020–2026): Roland Dethou
- Area^{1}: 5.89 km^{2} (2.27 sq mi)
- Elevation: 478 m (1,568 ft)
- Highest elevation: 633 m (2,077 ft)
- Lowest elevation: 444 m (1,457 ft)
- Population (2023): 513
  - Density: 87.1/km^{2} (226/sq mi)
- Time zone: UTC+01:00 (CET)
  - Summer (DST): UTC+02:00 (CEST)
- INSEE/Postal code: 65335 /65200
- ^{1} French Land Register data, which excludes lakes, ponds, glaciers > 1 km^{2} (0.386 sq mi or 247 acres) and river estuaries.

Ordizan (French pronunciation: [ɔʁdizɑ̃]; Occitan: Ordisan) is a commune in the Hautes-Pyrénées department in south-western France.

== See also ==
- Communes of the Hautes-Pyrénées department
