= Manuel Álvarez-Uría =

Spanish cell biologist

Manuel Álvarez-Uría Rico-Villademoros
- Born: July 1, 1943 (age 82); Oviedo, Spain, U.S.
- Occupation: Academic / Histologist / Cell biologist

Manuel Álvarez-Uría Rico-Villademoros is a Spanish cell biologist who held the presidency of the Royal Academy of Medicine of the Principality of Asturias (Spain) for more than a decade until 2015. He has received some of the highest medical research prizes awarded in Spain. He was born in Oviedo, on July 1, 1943.

== Education ==
He graduated in Medicine and Surgery at the University of Valladolid in 1966, further becoming a Doctor of Medicine at the Complutense University of Madrid, He completed further studies at the universities of Paris and Harvard.

== Career ==
From 1967 to 1977rom 1967 Álvarez-Uría was a professor of Histology at the Complutense and Autonomous Universities of Madrid, Alcalá de Henares, Salamanca, and the University College of Toledo.[8] In 1977 he was professor of Cytology at the University of Salamanc. His laboratory carried out detailed studies of the ultrastructure of Harderian gland cells, and of various types of specialized neurosecretory neurons of the central nervous system of the hamster and other mammals.

During his tenure in the vice-presidency and presidency of the Royal Academy of Medicine of the Principality of Asturias, the institution created and consolidated the International Hippocrates Prize for Medical Research on Human Nutrition.

He has held the following administrative positions:

- Director of the University School of Nursing at the University of Oviedo, of which he is Honorary Director.
- Director of the Colegios Mayores San Gregorio and América de Oviedo, of which he is a Collegiate of Honour.
- Director of Social Action of the University of Oviedo.
- Director of the School of Sports Medicine at the University of Oviedo.
- Director of the Department of Morphology and Cellular Biology at the University of Oviedo.
- Vice-Rector for Students of the University of Oviedo.

He has been a representative of the University of Oviedo to the Royal Institute of Asturian Studies, the Social Council of the University, the Insertion Council of the Principality of Asturias, the Board of Trustees of the Spanish Foundation for Science and Technology (FYCIT), the Culture Council of Asturias, the Regional Research Commission, and the Council of Asturian Communities, of which he was vice president.

Together with Gabino González-González, Álvarez-Uría wrote a biographical book about Santiago Ramón y Cajal.

== Work ==
=== Papers ===
His most cited peer-reviewed articles on the ultrastructure of secretory cells in mammals are:

- López, J. M.; Tolivia, J.; Díaz, C.; Alvarez-Uría, M. (November 1, 1990). "Ultrastructural study of lamellar and nucleolus-like bodies in the harderian gland during postnatal development of the hamster (Mesocricetus auratus ): ULTRASTRUCTURAL STUDY OF HARDERIAN GLAND". The Anatomical Record. 228 (3): 247–254. doi:10.1002/ar.1092280303. PMID 2175573. S2CID 22115812.
- López, José M.; Tolivia, Jorge; Alvarez-Uría, Manuel (August 1, 1992). "Postnatal development of the harderian gland in the Syrian golden hamster (Mesocricetus auratus ): A light and electron microscopic study: HARDERIAN GLAND DEVELOPMENT". The Anatomical Record. 233 (4): 597–616. doi:10.1002/ar.1092330414. PMID 1626719. S2CID 44839488.
- Lóapez, J. M.; Tolivia, J.; Alvarez-Uría, M.; Payne, A. P.; McGadey, J.; Moore, M. R. (March 1, 1993). "An electron microscopic study of the harderian gland of the Syrian hamster with particular reference to the processes of formation and discharge of the secretory vacuoles: HARDERIAN GLAND OF HAMSTER". The Anatomical Record. 235 (3): 342–352. doi:10.1002/ar.1092350303. PMID 8430904. S2CID 11379536.

=== Books ===
- Gonzalez Gonzalez, Gabino; Alzarez-Uria, Manuel (1984). La glándula pineal de los mamíferos. Universidad de Oviedo. ISBN 978-84-7468-095-9. OCLC 19981964.
- Paniagua, R; Nistal, M; Sesma, MP (1997). Citlología e histlogía vegetal y animal : biología de las celulas y tejidos animales y vegetales. McGraw-Hill. ISBN 84-486-0181-5. OCLC 41021296.
- Álvarez-Uría Rico-Villademoros, Manuel (2007). Estrés y enfermedad [Texto impreso]: lección inaugural del curso 2007-2008. Ediciones de la Universidad de Oviedo.
- Paniagua, R; Nistal, M; Sesma, P; Álvarez-Uría, M; Fraile, B; Anadón, R; Sáez, FJ (2017). Biología Celular y Molecular. Madrid: McGraw Hill. ISBN 978-84-486-1297-9.

== Honors ==
- National Research Award "Gregorio Marañón" (1972).
- National Research Award "Santiago Ramón y Cajal" (1973), received jointly with the researcher Gabino González González. for their ultrastructural investigations of the neuroendocrine system.
- Appointed by his alma mater to deliver the Inaugural Lecture for the opening of the 2007 Spanish university classes, in a special ceremony with the presence of the King and Queen of Spain and other high dignitaries, in the auditorium of the University of Oviedo on the occasion of the fourth centenary of the foundation of the institution.
