= Chuska Valley =

Region of New Mexico, United States

Coordinates: 36.2°N 108.7°W

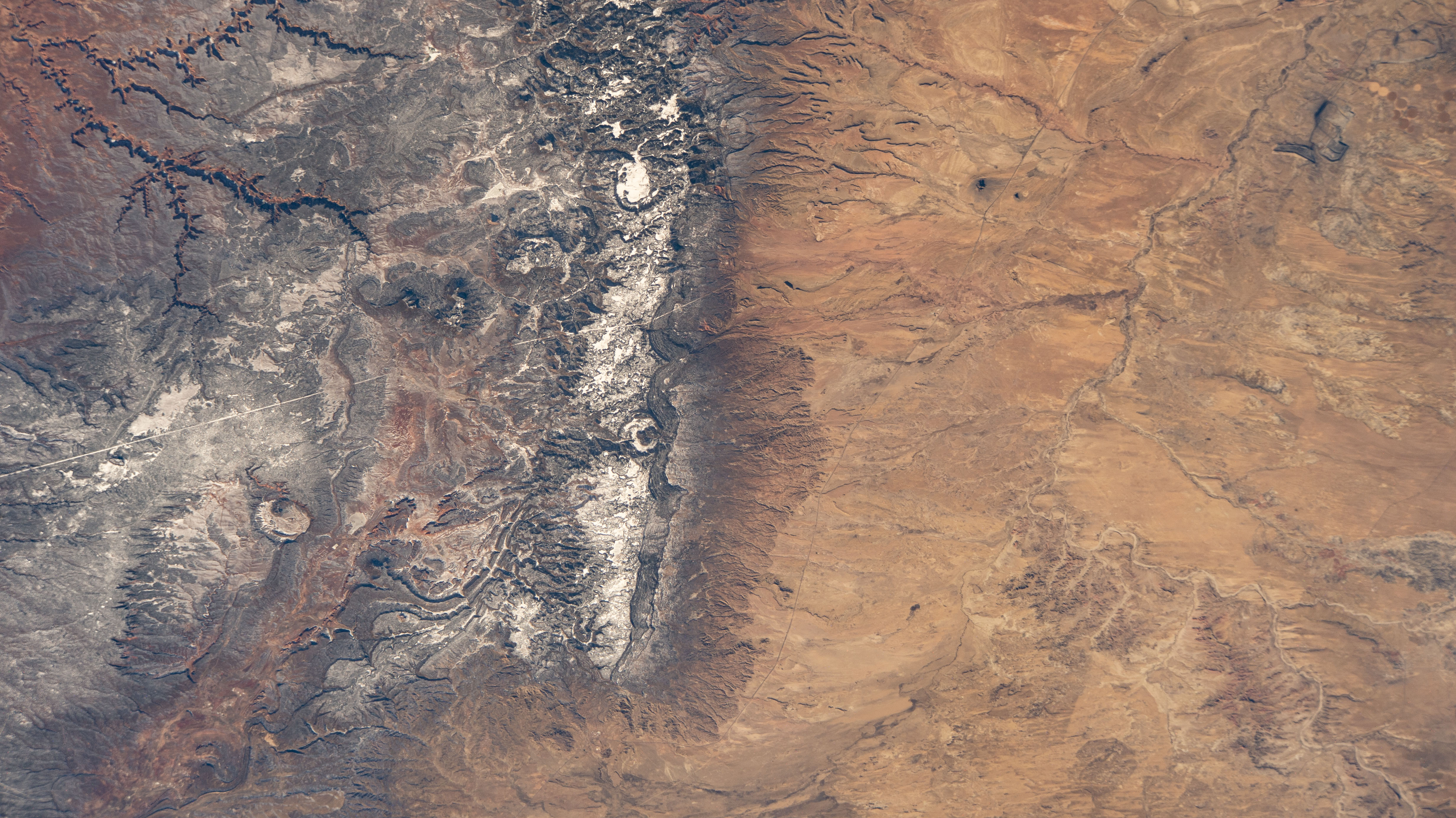
Chuska Valley to the right (east) of the Chuska Mountains (vertical, center) as seen from the ISS in 2020.

The Chuska Valley is a geographical region located in the northwestern portion of the U.S. state of New Mexico. Although identified as a "valley" in archaeological literature, the region encompasses the eastern slope of the Chuska Mountains, situated in their rain shadow. Sitting atop the Colorado Plateau in the Four Corners region of the desert Southwest, it is near both Chacra Mesa and Chaco Canyon, which are noted for their Chacoan Anasazi ruins. The Chaco Slope is differentiated from the neighboring Gobernador Slope, Chaco Core, and Chaco Plateau by distinct surface water drainage patterns and geological formations. These regions were first labelled by archaeologist Gwinn Vivian.

== Citations ==
Fagan, B (2005), Chaco Canyon: Archaeologists Explore the Lives of an Ancient Society, Oxford University Press, ISBN 0-19-517043-1
