= Bluff Great House =

Ancestral Puebloan great house

Bluff Great House is an Ancestral Puebloan great house and archeological site located in southeastern Utah, United States. The site lies near the north bank of the San Juan River, approximately 130 miles (210 km) northwest of Chaco Culture National Historical Park. It contained between fifty and sixty rooms, with four kivas and a great kiva nearby. Two ancient road segments were found in the area, and several berms were leveled to create a terrace, which is rare in Chacoan sites. The great house was partially excavated from 1996 to 2004, and archeologists believe the site was constructed, in at least two stages, between 1075 and 1150 CE by Chacoans who interacted with the Puebloan residents of both Mesa Verde and Kayenta, Arizona. Bluff Great House was abandoned c. 1250.

== Bibliography ==
- Vivian, R. Gwinn; Hilpert, Bruce (2012), The Chaco Handbook: An Encyclopedic Guide (2 ed.), University of Utah Press, ISBN 978-1-60781-195-4
