= Juan Manuel Álvarez =

Juan Manuel Álvarez may refer to:

- Juan Manuel Álvarez (born 1979), American convicted of causing the 2005 Glendale train crash
- Juan Álvarez (footballer, born 1948), played for the Mexico national football team
- Juan Álvarez (footballer, born July 1996), currently playing for C.F. Monterrey
