= Carrizo Mountains =

Landform in Apache County, Arizona

Coordinates: 36°50′N 109°07′W

The Carrizo Mountains (36°50' N, 109°7'W) is a small, mostly circular mountain range 15 to 20 km (9.3 to 12.4 mi) in diameter located on the Colorado Plateau in northeastern Arizona. The range is about 20 km (12 mi) southwest of the Four Corners. The highest summit, Pastora Peak, is 2,869 m (9,413 ft) in elevation, whereas elevations on the surrounding plateau are near 1,800 m (5,900 ft).

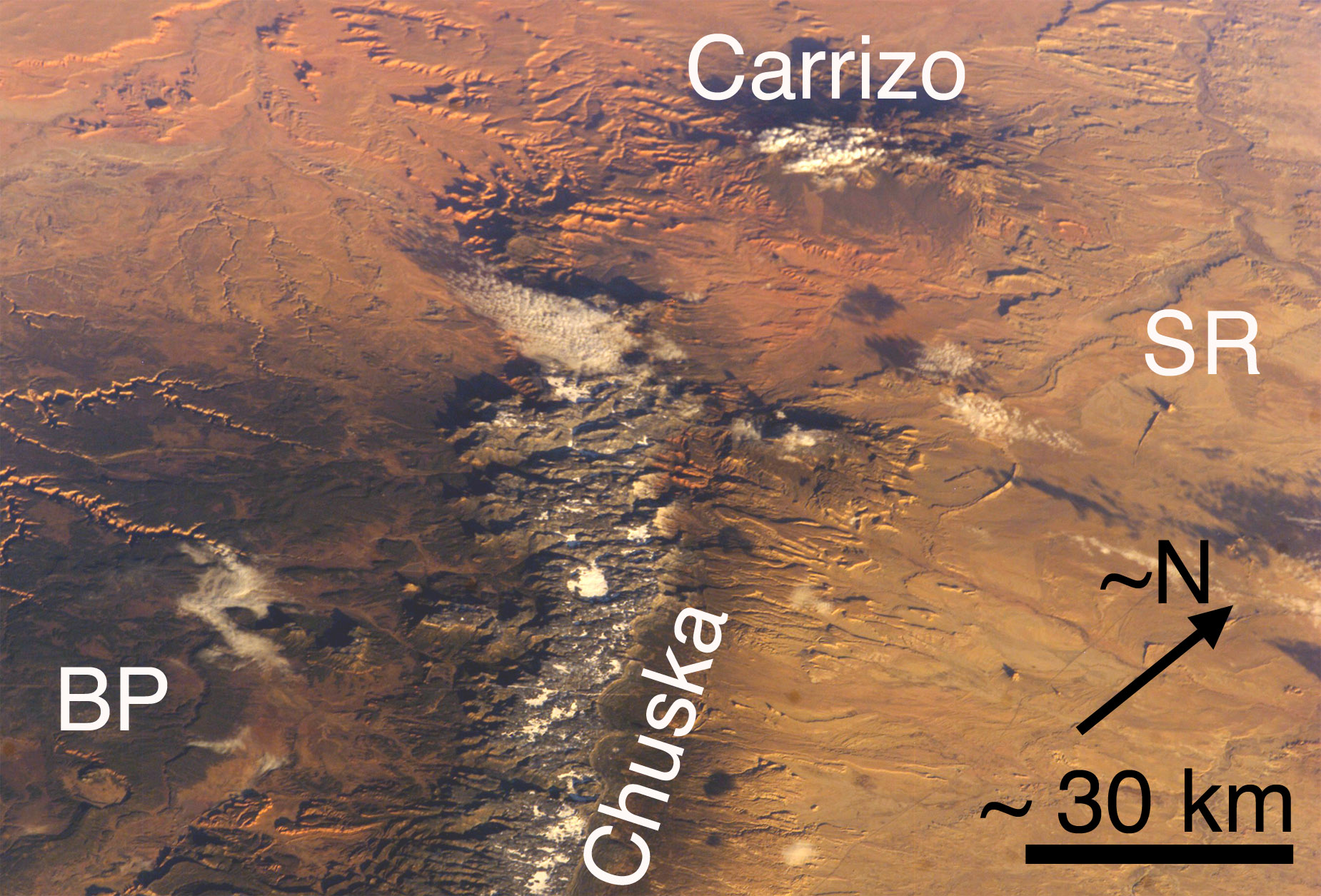
Carrizo Mountains (Arizona) and Chuska Mountains (Arizona and New Mexico), each with a little snow. Also, two features of the Navajo Volcanic Province: BP Buell Peak (Arizona), (at southeast perimeter Canyon de Chelly, on north Defiance Plateau), and SR Ship Rock (New Mexico), (east of Red Rock Valley, colored red, and the Lukachukai Mountains, attached at north Chuskas).

The mountains are within the Navajo Nation. Teec Nos Pos, Arizona, the closest community, is adjacent at the northern foothills, on Teec Nos Pos Wash, from Pastora Peak, about 5-mi miles to the north from the mountain's perimeter; Teec Nos Pos had about 800 inhabitants in the 2000 census.

== Geology ==
The Carrizo Mountains primarily consist of igneous rocks that intruded Permian through Cretaceous marine strata. The most common igneous rock type is porphyritic hornblende diorite. Intrusive forms include laccoliths, stocks, sills, and dikes. Ages of the igneous rocks range from 70 to 74 million years.

Similar igneous-cored ranges of the Colorado Plateau, including the Henry Mountains, Abajo Mountains and La Sal Range, formed ca. 31 to 20 million years ago, making them distinctly younger than the late Cretaceous intrusions of the Carrizo Mountains. Radiometric ages of igneous intrusions in Sleeping Ute Mountain are essentially identical to those of the diorite intrusions in the Carrizos. Both the Carrizo Mountains and Sleeping Ute Mountain are located along the southwest extension of the Colorado Mineral Belt, a 250-mile long lineament characterized by igneous rocks associated with abundant ore deposits. Large ore deposits have not been found in the igneous rocks of the Carrizo Mountains, although small deposits of uranium, vanadium, copper and silver have been found in the sedimentary rocks of the Morrison Formation.
