= John M. Washington =

American military officer (c. 1797–1853)

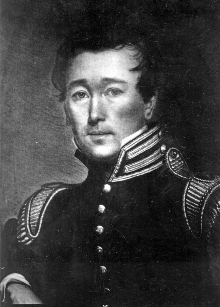

Governor of New Mexico
- In office 10 October 1848 – 23 October 1849
- Preceded by: Sterling Price (military); Donaciano Vigil (civil)
- Succeeded by: John Munroe

Personal details
- Born: c. 1797 Fredericksburg, Virginia
- Died: 24 December 1853 at sea off of the Capes of Delaware
- Occupation: Soldier
- Known for: Military Governor of New Mexico

Military service
- Branch/service: US Army
- Years of service: 1817–1853
- Rank: Major; Brevet Lieutenant Colonel

John MacRae Washington (c. 1797 - December 24, 1853) was an American artillery officer who became military governor of New Mexico shortly after the end of the Mexican–American War of 1846–1848.

== Early career ==
John M. Washington was born in Virginia, and was a remote relative of President George Washington. He graduated from West Point in 1817, and fought in Florida against the Seminole and Creek people. He served with distinction in the Mexican–American War of 1846–1848 under Brigadier General John E. Wool, being promoted to major and brevet lieutenant colonel following the Battle of Buena Vista. He reached Santa Fe on 10 October 1848 with four dragoon companies. The next day he assumed office as governor, combining the civil and military roles.

== Governor of New Mexico ==
Washington's main priority was to settle a war against the Navajo people. He assembled a strong force of soldiers and volunteers that moved west into Navajo country, where they were met by Navajo envoys saying they were willing to discuss peace, and then met the main Navajo forces. A scuffle broke out when a militiaman spotted a horse that he claimed had been stolen from him. The Navajos fled, and Washington's troops killed six of the fleeing men. One was the old warrior Narbona, now in favor of peace, who was scalped by a U.S. militiaman. The expedition moved on through a pass that one of them named "Washington Pass". In 1992, in response to a proposal by the Navajo people, the pass was renamed Narbona Pass. There were no positive results from the expedition. On returning to Santa Fe Washington became involved in a scandal, probably unjustified, over a child he allegedly fathered on an orphan girl.

In April 1849 Father Ramón Ortiz y Miera arrived in New Mexico from Chihuahua as commissioner in charge of assisting Mexicans who wished to resettle in Chihuahua. He was welcomed by Governor Washington and Secretary Donaciano Vigil, who both thought he was unlikely to succeed and even offered to supply transport to Mexicans seeking repatriation. Their mood changed quickly when the people of San Miguel del Vado alone submitted 900 requests for repatriation assistance. Vigil said that Ortíz could not conduct recruitment in person since his presence would disturb the peace. Ortiz then appointed agents to recruit New Mexico families, and they met with considerable success. In response Vigil cracked down further on recruitment. The United States' position was that the Treaty of Guadalupe Hidalgo had not covered repatriation, and Ortíz's activity was therefore illegal.

== Later career ==
By order of 26 May 1849, Brevet Colonel John Munroe was ordered to Santa Fe to relieve Brevet Lieutenant Colonel Washington. On 23 October 1849 Munroe took office as military governor of New Mexico. Washington was transferred to a position in Fort Constitution in New Hampshire. From there, in 1853 he was assigned to lead a body of troops from the 3rd Artillery Regiment in California, but at the start of the journey the steamer San Francisco ran into a storm. Washington and 181 soldiers were drowned at sea.
