= Lukachukai Mountains =

Landform in Apache County, Arizona

Coordinates: 36°29′04″N 109°12′13″W

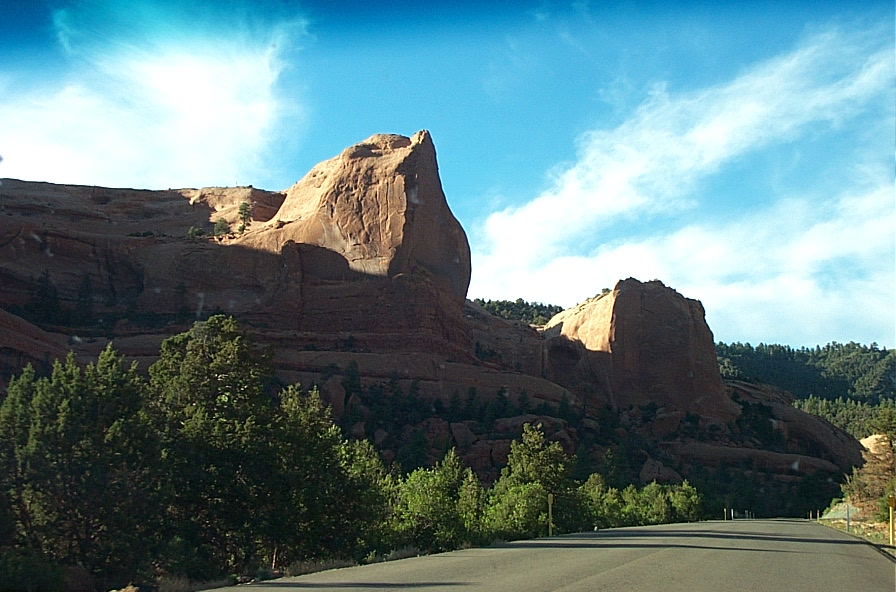
Buffalo Pass on Indian Route 13, Lukachukai Mountains, Arizona

The Lukachukai Mountains are a mountain range in the Chuska Mountains in northeast Arizona, entirely located on the Navajo Nation. The highest point of the range is an unnamed point at 9,466 feet (2,885 meters) above sea level. While open during the winter, no road maintenance is performed and chains or four wheel drive with good snow tires are essential due to grades of up to 14% in many places.

The Lukachukai Mountain trail gives access to some of the scenic red-rock high country here. The trailhead is located just south of Buffalo Pass on Indian Route 13, a paved highway. The trail is passable to OHVs in dry weather. A permit is required from the Navajo Nation government.

There is a belt of uranium deposits that crosses the Lukachukai Mountains. The ore belt is within a bed of lenticular sandstone and mudstone that apparently provided sufficient permeable sandstone for the passage of ore solutions, and sufficient impermeable mudstone to restrict movement of solutions to particular sandstone beds. An unusual concentration of organic material (carbonized wood?) served as a precipitation agent.

== Popular culture ==
The mountains are the opening setting for Tony Hillerman's The Blessing Way.
