= New Mexico State Road 134 =

State highway in New Mexico, United States

State Road 134

Route information
- Maintained by NMDOT
- Length: 22.470 mi (36.162 km)

Major junctions
- South end: Navajo 12 near McKinley
- North end: US 491 in Sheep Springs

Location
- Country: United States
- State: New Mexico
- Counties: San Juan, McKinley

Highway system
- New Mexico State Highway System; Interstate; US; State; Scenic
← NM 133	→ NM 135

State Road 134 (NM 134) is a 22.47-mile-long (36.16 km) state highway in the US state of New Mexico. NM 134's southern terminus is at Navajo 12 near McKinley, and the northern terminus is in Sheep Springs at U.S. Route 491 (US 491).

== Major intersections ==
County	Location	mi	km	Destinations	Notes
San Juan	Sheep Springs	0.000	0.000	US 491	Northern terminus
McKinley	McKinley	22.470	36.162	Navajo 12	Southern terminus
1.000 mi = 1.609 km; 1.000 km = 0.621 mi
