= James Calhoun (politician, born 1802) =

American politician

James S. Calhoun

1st Governor of New Mexico Territory
- In office 3 March 1851 – 6 May 1852
- Appointed by: Millard Fillmore
- Preceded by: John Munroe
- Succeeded by: William Carr Lane

U.S. Consul to Havana
- In office 1841–1842

Member of the Georgia State Senate
- In office 1845
- In office 1838–1840

Mayor of Columbus, Georgia
- In office 1838–1839

Member of the Georgia State Legislature
- In office 1830

Personal details
- Born: 1802 Georgia, U.S.
- Died: July 2, 1852 (aged 49–50) Independence, Missouri, U.S.
- Party: Whig Party

Military service
- Years of service: 1846–1848
- Rank: Lieutenant colonel
- Battles/wars: Mexican–American War

James Silas Calhoun (1802 – July 2, 1852) was an American politician and military officer who was the first governor of New Mexico Territory from 1851 to 1852.

== Career ==
While in his thirties and forties, Calhoun served in a variety of political roles in his home state of Georgia. He was elected as a member of Georgia state legislature in 1830. He became mayor of Columbus, Georgia, serving from 1838 to 1839. He served in the Georgia state senate from 1838 to 1840, and again in 1845. In between his terms in the state senate, he also acted as the U.S. consul in Havana, Cuba, from 1841 to 1842.

Calhoun held the rank of lieutenant colonel in the US volunteers during the Mexican War. After the war, he remained in the border region and held key positions with the U.S. government.

The president appointed Calhoun the federal Indian agent for the newly acquired territory of New Mexico. During his two-year tenure in that position, Calhoun used various tactics to convince or coerce Pueblo Native Americans to renounce their rights under the Treaty of Guadalupe Hidalgo as former Mexican citizens. Calhoun claimed that he only sought to "protect" the Pueblos from their Mexican-American neighbors by excluding them from territorial affairs. At that time in New Mexico, the argument that Pueblos were citizens (but denied the right to vote) was being used to remove any federal protection from their lands and water rights so they could be sold on the open market. The Pueblo agricultural lands and water rights were some of the best in the Territory. Federal action initiated by Calhoun led to the recognition of the Pueblos by the federal government with the issuance of the Pueblo Grants pursuant to the Treaty of Guadalupe-Hidalgo. Calhoun also negotiated a treaty with several Pueblos that Congress ultimately did not adopt, primarily due to his premature death on a trip to Washington with a Pueblo delegation, and the subsequent federal action in 1854 recognizing the Pueblos and their lands.

President Millard Fillmore later appointed Calhoun as governor of New Mexico Territory in 1851. One of his first acts as governor was to propose laws restricting the movement of "free Negroes" into New Mexico. He garnered the support of wealthy Mexicans who feared for their own racial status in the U.S.

Shortly after the end of his term as governor, Calhoun died of scurvy near Independence, Missouri, carrying his own coffin, while en route to Washington, D.C., and eventually for his home in Georgia.
