= Book censorship in Canada =

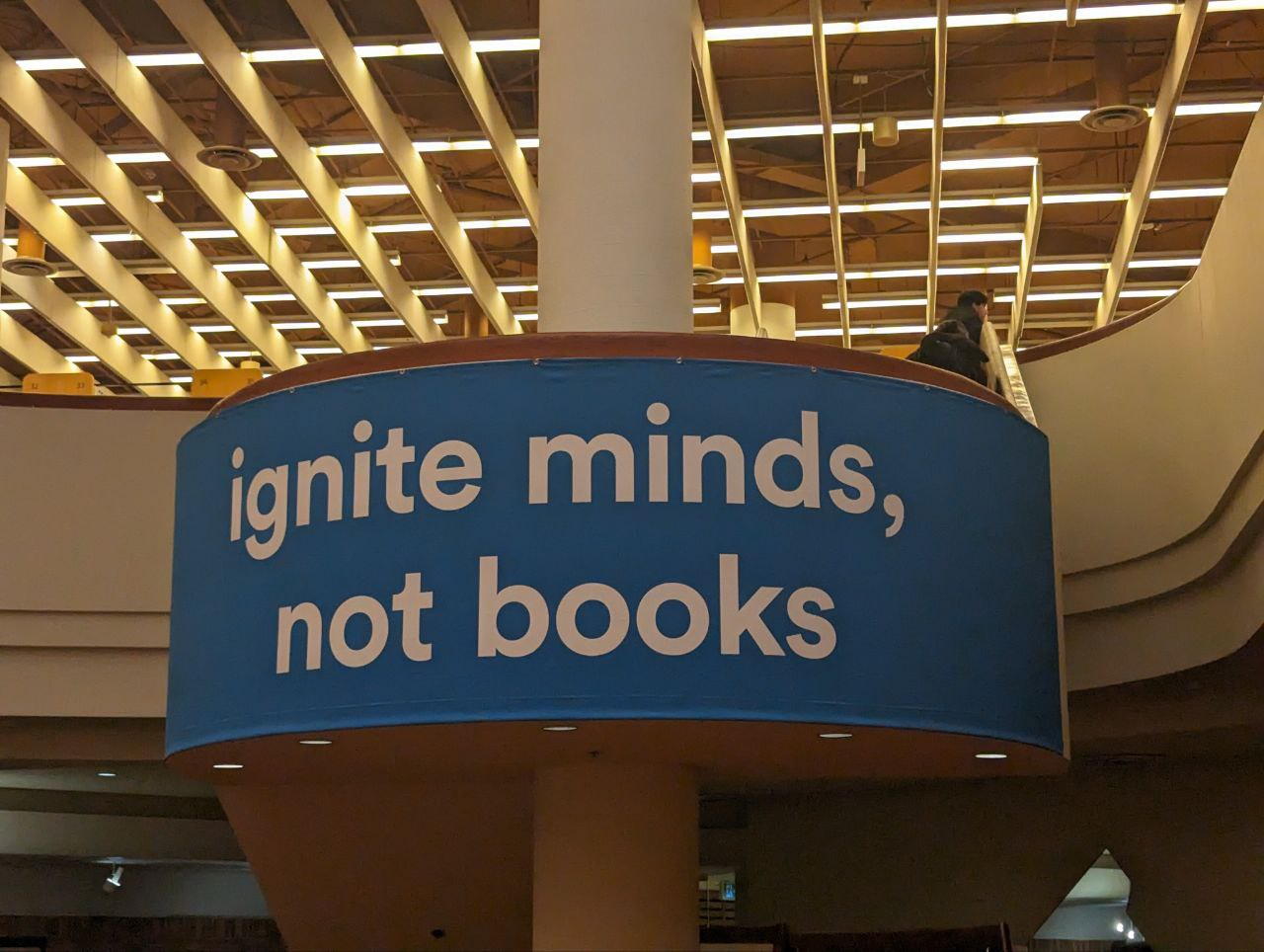
Sign at the Toronto Public Library against censorship

Book censorship in Canada is primarily limited to the control of which books may be imported. Canada Border Services Agency is able to block materials considered to be inappropriate from entering the country, although this practice has become less frequent since the Canadian Charter of Rights and Freedoms was put into place.

Domestic censorship is uncommon, although not impossible under the Criminal Code. For example, printing or disseminating any publication containing hate speech or child pornography is a criminal act. In times of war, these powers have sometimes been expanded to remove any publication with a viewpoint that opposed the government.

As with book censorship in the United States, the removal of publications from libraries due to public outrage is occasionally practiced. School libraries are especially likely to cause controversy. Canada has had a couple of widely publicized school board bans and one that notably turned into a Supreme Court of Canada battle, Chamberlain v. Surrey School District.

== Government censorship ==
The Canadian government guarantees freedom of speech and of the press within "reasonable limits" in the Charter of Rights and Freedoms. It is quite rare for Canada to ban books domestically, outside of wartime. The Criminal Code does prohibit certain kinds of speech, such as hate propaganda and "undue exploitation of sex". Therefore the publication of any such materials could result in criminal charges. During both World Wars, the War Measures Act brought into effect vast censorship, both to keep up morale and to insulate the country against opposing political views.

Canadian customs officials are empowered to block the import of any material considered to be hateful, obscene, seditious, or treasonous. The goal of these restrictions is largely to protect from the social harm that encouraging hateful and obscene behaviors can create. Critics, however, feel that this censorship infringes too much on their free speech rights. Unfortunately, what is or is not hateful or obscene is difficult to describe precisely. In the words of Justice Kenneth Smith "There are many examples of inconsistencies in Custom's treatment of publications." Because there are no hard limits to what is or is not banned, the law can be applied unevenly. When the Canadian Charter of Rights and Freedoms was passed in 1982, free speech rights became more protected, and fewer materials have been detained since. After the Little Sisters ruling customs censorship decreased once again because the law was revised so that Customs was responsible for proving the material was inappropriate instead of the onus being on the importer to prove it is not. Child pornography laws in Canada have also allowed for government censorship of books, including fictional books.

== School board bans ==
School board bans are usually responses to public outrage over explicit material. Primarily, these complaints are generated by individual parents, although on occasion they can come from teachers, administrators, or organizations like the Parents' Rights in Education group that was responsible for sweeping bans of LGBT books in 1997 Calgary. That being said, the definition of what is or is not explicit often reveals biases. Obscenity is a difficult term to define concretely, so the application of the law depends upon whether or not the material questioned would offend community standards. To be clear, that means community standards of the nation as a whole, not the standards of the community that the book was written for. Because of this, the removal of books tends to show prejudice. Where a book containing a chaste relationship between a straight couple is unlikely to raise any eyebrows, if that couple is gay the book is far more likely to offend the community.

The most prominent example of a school board ban happened in Surrey BC in 1997, where two teachers were "accused of promulgating a gay agenda" because they wanted to teach using picture books that included same-sex couples. The Surrey school board banned the three books ("One Dad, Two Dads, Brown Dad, Blue Dads", "Belinda's Bouquet", and "Asha's Mums") originally on the grounds that they might contradict the religious beliefs of the students' families. However, as the conversation continued they expounded that they believed homosexuality was inherently inappropriate for young children. Due to the religious nature of their reasoning, this decision was tried before the Supreme Court. In December 2002, the court overturned the ban 7–2, on the argument that certain kinds of families may not be excluded to make others feel more comfortable. In her comments about the case Chief Justice Beverly McLachlin wrote "Tolerance is always age appropriate".

In 2023, the Peel District School Board attempted to remove all titles that had been published before 2008 as an "equity-based weeding process". These books were perceived as inherently lacking inclusivity and thus harming students based solely on their publication date. The district prevented these books from being donated and required them to be thrown out. There were plans to remove any book published more than fifteen years ago on an ongoing basis "to remain culturally relevant". Stephen Lecce ordered the weeding process to be halted from its completion after thousands of books had already been removed.

== History ==
=== Customs Act of 1847 ===
This began the tradition of preventing certain "books and drawings of an immoral or indecent character" from entering Canada. This was two decades before Canada gained self-governance.

=== World War 1 ===
The War Measures Act was introduced in August 1914 to obstruct Canadians from getting information about WWI. This act was used to prevent the publication and sale of both books and newspapers (as well as non-literary publications) that had been outlawed. Should an individual decide to print censored material anyways, they would be presumed guilty until proven innocent and could be subject to a fine and/or jail time. The suitability of these materials was primarily determined by Chief Censor Ernest Chambers, who then sought out approval from the secretary of state and postmaster general. In 1919 the War Measures Act was expanded in an attempt to prevent the spread of socialism. This resulted in the prohibition of many leftist publications including The Western Clarion. Later that same year section 98 went into effect, prohibiting all materials that endorsed violent protest methods.

=== The Padlock Law ===
Quebec put its Padlock Law into place in 1937, in a further attempt to quell the spread of communism. This law gave prosecutors the power to arrest any person advocating for communism in any format. Although this law was not strictly targeted at literary censorship, it did make it illegal to print leftist materials, and officials were empowered to shut down printing houses which had the effect of banning a number of publications. The Padlock Law remained in place until 1957.

=== World War 2 ===
In 1939 the War Measures Act was put back into effect and the Defense of Canada Regulations were created. However, the restrictions provided were less strict than they were in the First World War and often relied on cooperation from editors to emphasize patriotic viewpoints. That being said approximately 600 publications were banned, primarily those with leftist sympathies or that could be perceived to betray military secrets.

=== Crime comics ===
Throughout the 1940s and 50s, many countries in the Western world began to devote their attentions to the threat of moral degradation from comic books, and Canada was no exception. In British Columbia, outrage reached a fever pitch in 1948 when two children shot a passing motorist. The opinion of the Judge in this case, as published by the Peace River Block News, was that the actions of these boys were to be blamed on the influence of comic books that glorify criminal activities. Following this trial the Fulton Bill, formally known as Bill 10 of the 21st Canadian Parliament, was introduced in 1949 by Parliament Member Davie Fulton. This bill included crime comics under the definition of obscene materials and remained in effect until December 2018.

In 1954, the same year that the US Subcommittee on Juvenile Delinquency concluded that comic books were a moral evil, The Advisory Board on Objectionable Publications (ABOP) was formed in Alberta. The goal of ABOP was to weed out obscene materials from the province (focusing on comic books and magazines). The board removed over 20% of periodicals from sale but was dissolved in 1976, mostly due to complaints over the secrecy of their process.

=== Charter of Rights and Freedoms ===
Put into place in 1982, the charter gives all Canadians the right to "freedom of thought, belief, opinion and expression, including freedom of the press and other media of communication". The implementation of such protections at a constitutional level resulted in a marked decrease in banning books.

However, Section 1 states that the charter "guarantees the rights and freedoms set out in it subject only to such reasonable limits prescribed by law as can be demonstrably justified in a free and democratic society". This section can be used to undermine other freedoms, so the charter does not entirely prevent censorship, but it does make it less common.

=== Little Sisters Book and Art Emporium v Canada ===
Little Sisters Book and Art Emporium, a gay and lesbian bookstore in Vancouver, continually had books seized at the border under accusations of obscenity. The bookstore alleged that the customs regulations that allowed so-called obscene materials to be detained violated their rights under the Canadian Charter of Rights and Freedoms. Specifically, section 2(b) which provides "freedom of thought, belief, opinion and expression, including freedom of the press and other media of communication" and section 15 which establishes "equal benefit of the law without discrimination". In Justice Smith's 1996 ruling Little Sisters won only a partial victory. The court ruled that customs officials had applied the law unfairly when they targeted the bookstore due to its queer content and that some of the materials detained had not been obscene. However, Justice Smith did not believe that the law itself was unfair, only the way it was enforced in this specific case. The case was appealed to the Supreme Court of Canada, which upheld the decision, in December 2000. However, the law was revised so the responsibility to prove obscenity was now placed on the customs authorities. As opposed to importers having to prove that materials were not obscene.

=== Hansel et Gretel ===
Prime Minister Paul Martin's 38th Canadian Parliament expanded child pornography law, which already included fictional works, to also include literary descriptions in 2005. Quebec author Yvan Godbout was arrested and charged with making and distributing child pornography due to his horror novel Hansel et Gretel featuring writing of fictional child sexual abuse. Godbout was acquitted and found not guilty in 2020. Due to this experience, Godbout felt compelled to stop writing altogether and ended his career in 2023.

=== Alberta libraries ===
==== School libraries ====
On May 26, 2025, Alberta premier Danielle Smith announced her intention to ban "sexual content" from school libraries in Alberta; the government stated these new rules "would apply to public, separate, francophone, charter and independent schools". In July 2025, the provincial government issued an order to school libraries restricting books with "explicit sexual content". Alberta's Education and Childcare Minister Demetrios Nicolaides did not provide a list of books to be removed, but provided four examples of sexually explicit content: Fun Home (2006) by Alison Bechdel, Gender Queer (2019) by Maia Kobabe; Blankets (2003) by Craig Thompson; and Flamer (2020) by Mike Curato. Notably, all four examples of objectionable materials are graphic novels depicting coming-of-age and LGBTQ subjects.

A parental rights group, Parents for Choice in Education (PCE), and a conservative Christian lobbying group, Action4Canada, later took credit for supplying Nicolaides with the book titles they wanted removed from school libraries.

Following the release of the ministerial order, Alberta Teachers' Association president Jason Schilling released a statement opposing the "order, saying it may make students believe 'some expressions of their gender and sexual identities are shameful and should be hidden away'" and that "the sweeping scope of this ministerial order will result in the removal of valuable and inclusive resources from our libraries". In August 2025, the Edmonton Public School Board's internally distributed a list of over 200 books to be removed from library shelves in order to comply with the new policy. The list included literary classics including The Handmaid's Tale, Brave New World, and I Know Why the Caged Bird Sings. When the list was leaked to the public, major international backlash ensued forcing the government to pause implementation. In September 2025, the government announced a revised policy that requires restriction of books containing explicit images of sexual acts, but not written descriptions of the same.

==== Public libraries ====
In April 2026, Alberta's United Conservative Party government then introduced a bill restricting access to sexually graphic visual content in public libraries for children ages 15 and under; this bill also adds the ability for public libraries to be reviewed by the municipal affairs minister. Municipal Affairs Minister Dan Williams showcased Gender Queer (2019) and Blankets (2003) as examples of literature that the provincial government had been hearing about "informally", which contributed to the bill's development. The Coalition of Alberta Public Libraries, which represents Alberta's 324 public library services, stated "none of its members were consulted about the bill" and "called the bill an 'act of censorship'". Matthew Scace of The Globe and Mail reported that the bill is part of a broader set of policies introduced in recent years by Premier Danielle Smith's government and highlighted that following the 2025 school library ministerial order, the provincial government "faced accusations of book banning from education and free-speech advocates and raised the ire of numerous authors, including Canadian literary icon Margaret Atwood".

== List of banned books ==
Title	Author(s)	Year published	Type	Notes
Droll Stories	Honoré de Balzac	1837	Short stories	Banned for obscenity in 1914.
Lady Chatterley's Lover	D. H. Lawrence	1928	Novel	The unexpurgated United States edition was allowed to be imported by McClelland & Stewart in 1959. The book's status as an obscene publication was not resolved until a ruling by the Supreme Court of Canada in 1962.
By Grand Central Station I Sat Down and Wept	Elizabeth Smart	1945	Autobiographical prose poetry	Banned in Canada from 1945 to 1975 under the influence of Smart's family's political power due to its sexual documentation of Smart's affair with a married man.
The Naked and the Dead (1948)	Norman Mailer	1948	Novel	Banned in Canada in 1949 for "obscenity".
Lolita (1955)	Vladimir Nabokov	1955	Novel	Banned in Canada in 1956. The ban was not enforced on imports of the Putnam edition from the United States and was lifted in late 1958.
Peyton Place (1956)	Grace Metalious	1956	Novel	Banned in Canada from 1956 to 1958.
How to Kill (series)	John Minnery	1973	Instructional	Banned in Canada in 1977.
The Hoax of the Twentieth Century	Arthur Butz	1976	Non-fiction	Classified as "hate literature" in Canada with the Royal Canadian Mounted Police destroying copies as recently as 1995.
The Turner Diaries	William Luther Pierce	1978	Novel	Classified as "hate literature" in Canada and subsequently banned from import into the country.
Lethal Marriage	Nick Pron	1995	True crime	Written by a newspaper reporter about the Paul Bernardo and Karla Homolka case, this book allegedly contains inaccuracies, additionally, complaints were received by the St. Catharines library board from the mother of a victim that led to the book being removed from all public library branches in the city. As recently as 1999, this book was still unavailable to public library patrons in St. Catharines.
Lost Girls	Alan Moore and Melinda Gebbie	2006	Graphic novel	Importation was initially prohibited on publication in 2006. The prohibition was overturned in October 2006 after a formal appeal by the publisher to the Canada Border Services Agency determined the book was not legally obscene.
