= Sarecky =

Sarecky is a surname. Notable persons with this name include:

- Barney Sarecky (1895–1968), American film producer and screenwriter
- Louis Sarecky (1886–1946), Russian-born American film producer and screenwriter, brother of Barney
- Melody Sarecky, co-author of One Dad, Two Dads, Brown Dad, Blue Dads
