= Amy June Bates =

American author and illustrator

Amy June Bates is an American artist and children's author and illustrator based in Pennsylvania. She was born in Utah.

== Awards and honors ==
The Bulletin of the Center for Children's Books named Sam the Man & the Rutabaga Plan, written by Frances O'Roark Dowell, as one of the best fictional children's books of 2017. The Leadership Journey, written by Doris Kearns Goodwin, was on the The New York Times Best Seller list for Middle Grade Hardcover in 2024.

Awards for Bates's work
Year	Title	Award	Result	Ref.
2009	You Can Do It!	NAACP Image Award for Outstanding Literary Work – Children	Finalist	
2012	Waiting for the Magic	Gryphon Award	Honor	
2016	Ketzel, the Cat who Composed	Sydney Taylor Book Award for Younger Readers	Winner	
2018	Sam the Man & the Rutabaga Plan	Gryphon Award	Honor	
2020	Gittel's Journey	Sydney Taylor Book Award for Younger Readers	Honor	
2024	Hidden Hope	Sydney Taylor Book Award for Younger Readers	Honor	

== Publications ==
=== As author ===
- Bates, Amy June; Bates, Juniper (2016). The Big Umbrella. Wiseman.
- Bates, Amy June (2020). When I Draw a Panda. Wiseman.
- Bates, Amy June (2023). The Welcome Home. Wiseman.

=== As illustrator ===
- Stern, Ricki (2002). Beryl E. Bean #1: Mighty Adventurer of the Planet. Illustrated by Amy June Bates. HarperTrophy.
- Turner, Ann (2004). Pumpkin Cat. Illustrated by Amy June Bates. Hyperion.
- English, Karen (2005). Speak to Me (and I Will Listen Between the Lines). Illustrated by Amy June Bates. Farrar.
- Rodowsky, Colby (2005). The Next-Door Dogs. Illustrated by Amy June Bates. Farrar.
- Tinkham, Kelly A. (2007). Hair for Mama. Illustrated by Amy June Bates. Dial.
- Wilson, Karma (2007). I Will Rejoice. Illustrated by Amy June Bates. Zonderkidz.
- Wilson, Karma (2007). Give Thanks to the Lord: Celebrating Psalm 92. Illustrated by Amy June Bates. Zonderkidz.
- Dungy, Tony (2008). You Can Do It!. Illustrated by Amy June Bates. Simon & Schuster.
- Krull, Kathleen (2008). Hillary Rodham Clinton: Dreams Taking Flight. Illustrated by Amy June Bates. Simon & Schuster.
- Campbell, Bebe Moore (2008). I Get So Hungry. Illustrated by Amy June Bates. Putnam.
- Hest, Amy (2008). The Dog Who Belonged to No One. Illustrated by Amy June Bates. Abrams.
- Kurtz, Jane (2008). Martin's Dream. Illustrated by Amy June Bates. Simon & Schuster.
- Bryant, Jen (2009). Abe's Fish: A Boyhood Tale of Abraham Lincoln. Illustrated by Amy June Bates. Sterling.
- Tolan, Stephanie S. (2009). Wishworks, Inc. Illustrated by Amy June Bates. Levine.
- Krull, Kathleen (2010). The Brothers Kennedy: John, Robert, Edward. Illustrated by Amy June Bates. Simon & Schuster.
- Meyers, Susan (2010). Bear in the Air. Illustrated by Amy June Bates. Abrams.
- Richardson, Justin; Parnell, Peter (2010). Christian, The Hugging Lion. Illustrated by Amy June Bates. Simon & Schuster.
- MacLachlan, Patricia (2011). Waiting for the Magic. Illustrated by Amy June Bates. Atheneum.
- Myers, Laurie (2011). Escape by Night: A Civil War Adventure. Holt.
- Comden, Betty; Green, Adolph; Leigh, Carolyn (2012). Flying to Neverland with Peter Pan. Illustrated by Amy June Bates. Blue Apple.
- Jewel (2012). That's What I'd Do. Illustrated by Amy June Bates. Wiseman.
- Reich, Susanna (2012). Minette's Feast: The Delicious Story of Julia Child and Her Cat. Illustrated by Amy June Bates. Abrams.
- Jewel (2013). Sweet Dreams. Illustrated by Amy June Bates. Simon & Schuster.
- Macdonald, Marianne (2013). The Christmas Cat. Illustrated by Amy June Bates. Dial.
- Meyers, Susan (2013). Rock-a-Bye Room. Illustrated by Amy June Bates. Abrams.
- Caldwell, Deanna (2015). Beach House. Illustrated by Amy June Bates. Viking.
- Johnston, Tony (2015). Loving Hands. Illustrated by Amy June Bates. Candlewick.
- Newman, Lesléa (2015). Ketzel, The Cat Who Composed. Illustrated by Amy June Bates. Candlewick.
- Sonnichsen, A. L. (2015). Red Butterfly. Illustrated by Amy June Bates. Simon & Schuster.
- Dowell, Frances O'Roark (2016). Sam the Man & the Chicken Plan. Dlouhy.
- Frost, Helen (2016). Applesauce Weather. Illustrated by Amy June Bates. Candlewick.
- Hest, Amy (2016). My Old Pal, Oscar. Illustrated by Amy June Bates. Abrams.
- Dowell, Frances O'Roark (2017). Sam the Man & the Rutabaga Plan. Dlouhy.
- Eagen, Cindy (2017). The Story of Barbie and the Woman Who Created Her. Illustrated by Amy June Bates. Random House.
- Newman, Lesléa (2018). Gittel's Journey: An Ellis Island Story. Illustrated by Amy June Bates. Abrams.
- Biden, Jill (2020). Joey: The Story of Joe Biden. Illustrated by Amy June Bates. Wiseman.
- Andros, Camille (2021). The Boy and the Sea. Illustrated by Amy June Bates. Abrams.
- Kephart, Beth (2021). And I Paint It: Henriette Wyeth's World. Illustrated by Amy June Bates. Cameron Kids.
- Trigiani, Adriana (2021). The House of Love. Illustrated by Amy June Bates. Viking.
- Boxer, Elisa (2023). Hidden Hope: How a Toy and a Hero Saved Lives During the Holocaust. Illustrated by Amy June Bates. Abrams.
- Goodwin, Doris Kearns (2024). The Leadership Journey: How Four Kids Became President. Illustrated by Amy June Bates. Simon & Schuster.
- Bryant, Jen (2025). Foote Was First! How One Curious Woman Connected Carbon Dioxide and Climate Change. Illustrated by Amy June Bates. Quill Tree.
