= Long Walk of the Navajo =

1864 ethnic cleansing in the US

- Part of the Navajo Wars
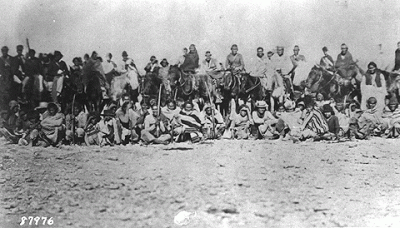
- Navajo people photographed during the Long Walk
- Location: Southwestern United States
- Attack type: Forced displacement, death march
- Deaths: 2,500–3,500 deaths during march and internment (1864–1868)
- Victims: Navajo, Mescalero
- Perpetrators: United States Federal Government: Gen. James Henry Carleton; Col. Kit Carson
- Motive: Settlers acquisition of Navajo lands and forced cultural assimilation of Navajo people

The Long Walk of the Navajo, also called the Long Walk to Bosque Redondo (Spanish: larga caminata del navajo), was the deportation and ethnic cleansing of the Navajo people by the United States federal government and the United States army in the 1860s. Navajos were forced to walk from their land in western New Mexico Territory (modern-day Arizona and New Mexico) to Bosque Redondo in eastern New Mexico. Some 53 different forced marches occurred between August 1864 and the end of 1866. In total, 10,000 Navajos and 500 Mescalero Apache were forced to the internment camp in Bosque Redondo. During the forced march and internment, up to 3,500 people died from starvation, disease and executions over a four-year period. In 1868, the Navajo were allowed to return to their ancestral homeland following the Treaty of Bosque Redondo. Some anthropologists state that the "collective trauma of the Long Walk ... is critical to contemporary Navajos' sense of identity as a people".

== Background ==
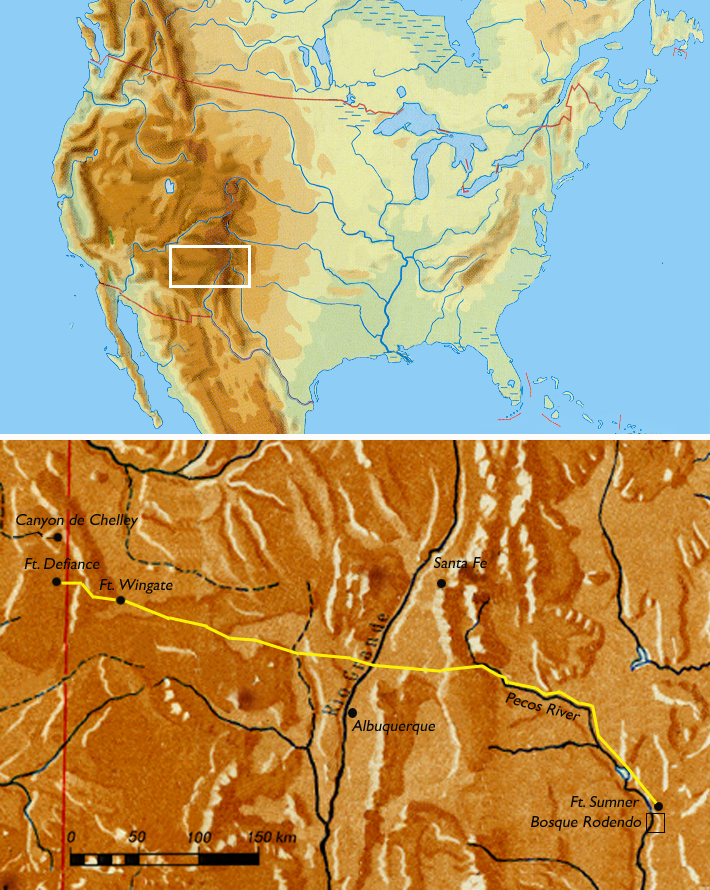
Map of the Long Walk

The traditional Navajo homeland spans from Arizona through New Mexico. Navajo built houses, planted crops, and raised livestock there. Groups or bands raided and traded with each other. This included interactions between the Navajo, Pueblos, Apache, Comanche, and Ute.

Hostilities escalated between American settlers and Navajos following the scalping of respected Navajo leader Narbona in 1849. In August 1851, Colonel Edwin Vose Sumner established Fort Defiance for the U.S. government (near present-day Window Rock, Arizona) and Fort Wingate (originally Fort Fauntleroy near Gallup, New Mexico). Prior to the Long Walk, treaties were signed in 1849, 1858, and 1861. (Note: Often truces, ceasefires and armistices are mistakenly called treaties. Treaties in the United States have been ratified by the US Senate. A truce or armistice are an agreement between combatants but not ratified by the US Congress. For example, The Bonneville Treaty of 1858 was agreed to by the Navajo and the US Military but it was never ratified by the US Senate.)

=== Navajo–Army conflicts ===
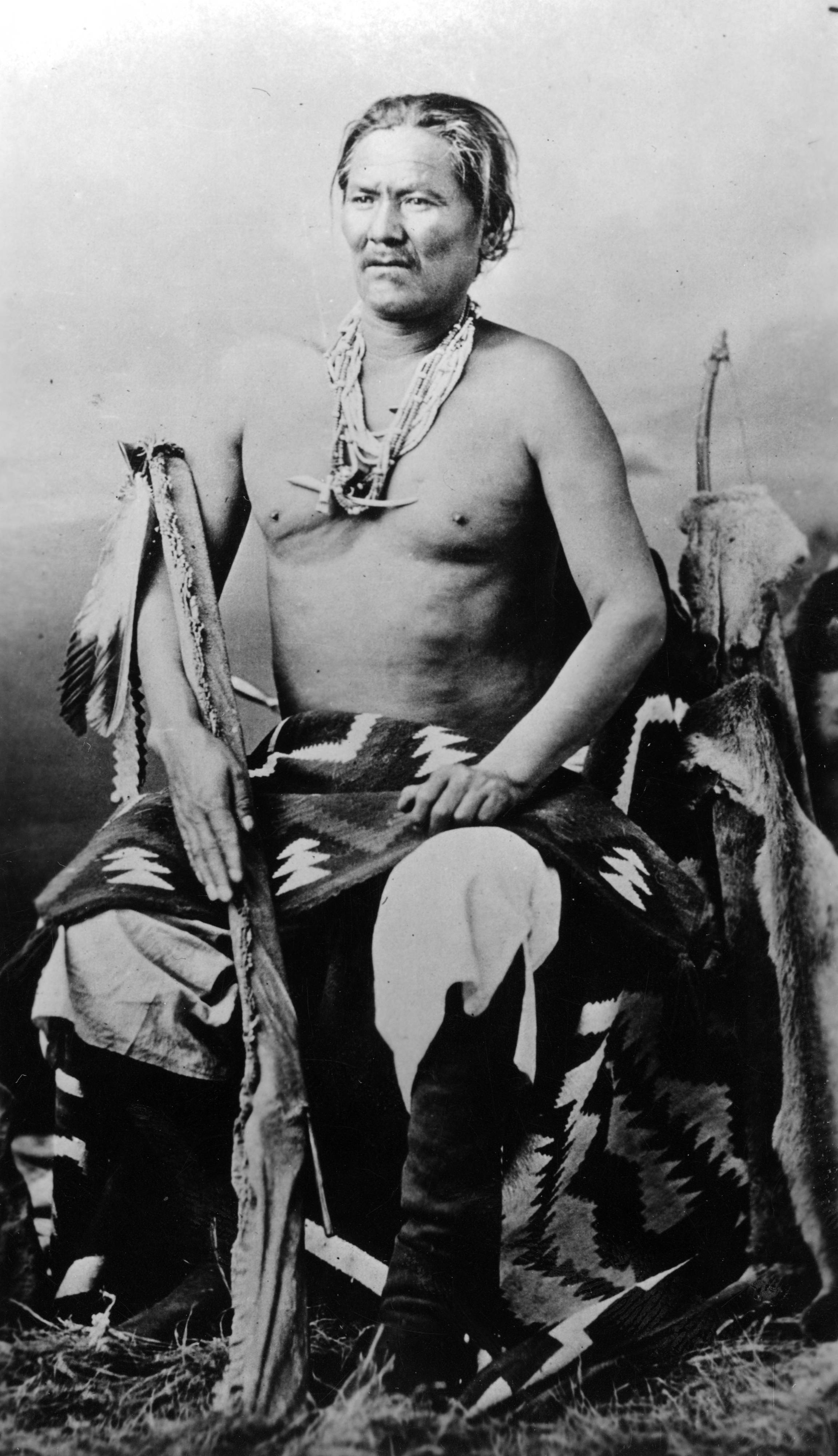
Manuelito, studio portrait, c. 1897

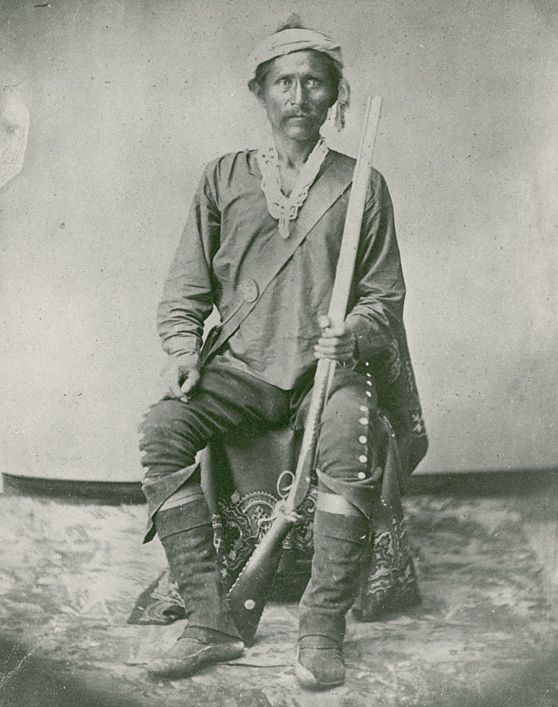
Barboncito, c. 1865

Friction between invading American settlers and Navajo groups was widespread between 1846 and 1863. Manuelito and Barboncito reminded the Navajo that the US Army was sending troops to wage war, that it had flogged a Navajo messenger, and that it opened fire on tribal headsman “Agua Chiquito”, during talks for peace. They argued that the army had refused to bring in feed for their animals at Ft. Defiance, took over the prime grazing land, and killed Manuelito's livestock there. On April 30, 1860, Manuelito and Barboncito with 1,000 Navajo warriors attacked the fort and almost took control.

Truces and treaties committed the Army to protect the Navajo. However, the Army allowed other Native American tribes and Mexicans to steal livestock and enslave Navajos. A truce was signed on February 15, 1861. They were again promised protection, but as part of the truce, two of the Navajo's four sacred mountains were taken from them, as well as about one-third of their traditional land. In March, a company of 52 citizens led by Jose Manuel Sanchez drove off a bunch of Navajo horses, but Captain Wingate followed the trail and recovered them for the Navajo, who had killed Sanchez. Another group of settlers ravaged Navajo rancherias in the vicinity of Beautiful Mountain. Also, during this time, a party of Mexicans and Pueblo Indians captured 12 Navajo in a raid, and three were brought in.

On August 9, 1861, Lt. Col. Manuel Antonio Chaves of the New Mexico Volunteer Militia took command of a garrison of three companies numbering 8 officers and 206 men at Fort Fauntleroy. Chaves was later accused of holding back supplies intended for the 1,000 or more Navajos who had remained close to the fort and was maintaining only lax discipline. Horse races began on September 10 and continued into the late afternoon of September 13. Col. Chaves permitted Post Sutler A. W. Kavanaugh to supply liquor to the Navajos. In September 22, a horse race took place between Manuelito and a Lieutenant Ortiz, which ended with Ortiz's victory, with the Navajo leader having difficulties controlling his horse. Afterwards, it was revealed that Manuelito's bridle reins were cut, likely slashed with a knife. When the Navajos demanded a rematch, the soldiers refused, claimed the blankets and jewels of great value the Navajos put up as bet and closed the fort's gates. When a Navajo tried to get inside, he was shot by a sentinel. Following escalating skirmish, the garrison unleashed a massacre, leaving 15 Navajos, mostly women and children, dead, and many more wounded or captured. On hearing this, General Canby demanded a report from Chaves, who did not comply. Canby sent Captain Andrew W. Evans to the fort, named Fort Lyon on September 25, who took command. Manuel Chaves, suspended from command, was confined to Albuquerque pending court-martial (the charges were dismissed after two months.) In February 1861, Chaves took the field with 400 militia and ransacked Navajo land, without federal authority.

=== Civil War and Kit Carson ===
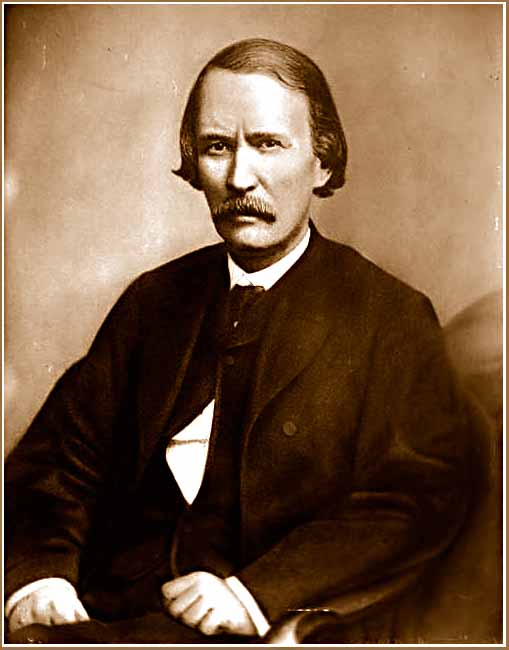
Undated photo of Kit Carson from the Library of Congress

With Confederate troops moving into southern New Mexico, Canby sent Agent John Ward into Navajo lands to persuade any who might be friendly to move to a central encampment near the village of Cubero. In return they would be offered government protection. Ward was instructed to warn all Navajos who refused to come that they would be treated as enemies; many came. Evans was overseeing the abandonment of Fort Lyon and had been told that the new policy was that the Navajo had to be removed to settlements or pueblos, mentioning the region of the Little Colorado west of Zuni as possibly an ideal place. In November, some Navajo started raiding again. On December 1, Canby wrote to his superior in St. Louis that "recent occurrences in the Navajo country have so demoralized and broken up [the Navajo] nation that there is now no choice between their absolute extermination or their removal and colonization at points so remote...as to isolate them entirely from the inhabitants of the Territory. Aside from all considerations of humanity, the extermination of such a people will be the work of the greatest difficulty."

By 1862, the Union Army had pushed the Confederates down the Rio Grande. The United States government again determined to eliminate Navajo raiding and raids on the Navajo. James H. Carleton was ordered to relieve Canby as Commander for the New Mexico Military Department in September 1862. Carleton ordered Colonel Christopher "Kit" Carson to proceed to Navajo territory and to receive the Navajo surrender on July 20, 1863. When no Navajos showed up, Carson and another officer entered Navajo territory in an attempt to persuade Navajos to surrender and used a scorched earth policy to starve the Navajo out of their traditional homeland and force them to surrender. By early 1864 thousands of Navajo began surrendering. Some Navajos refused and scattered to Navajo Mountain, the Grand Canyon, the territory of the Chiricahua Apache, and to parts of modern-day Utah.

== The Long Walk ==
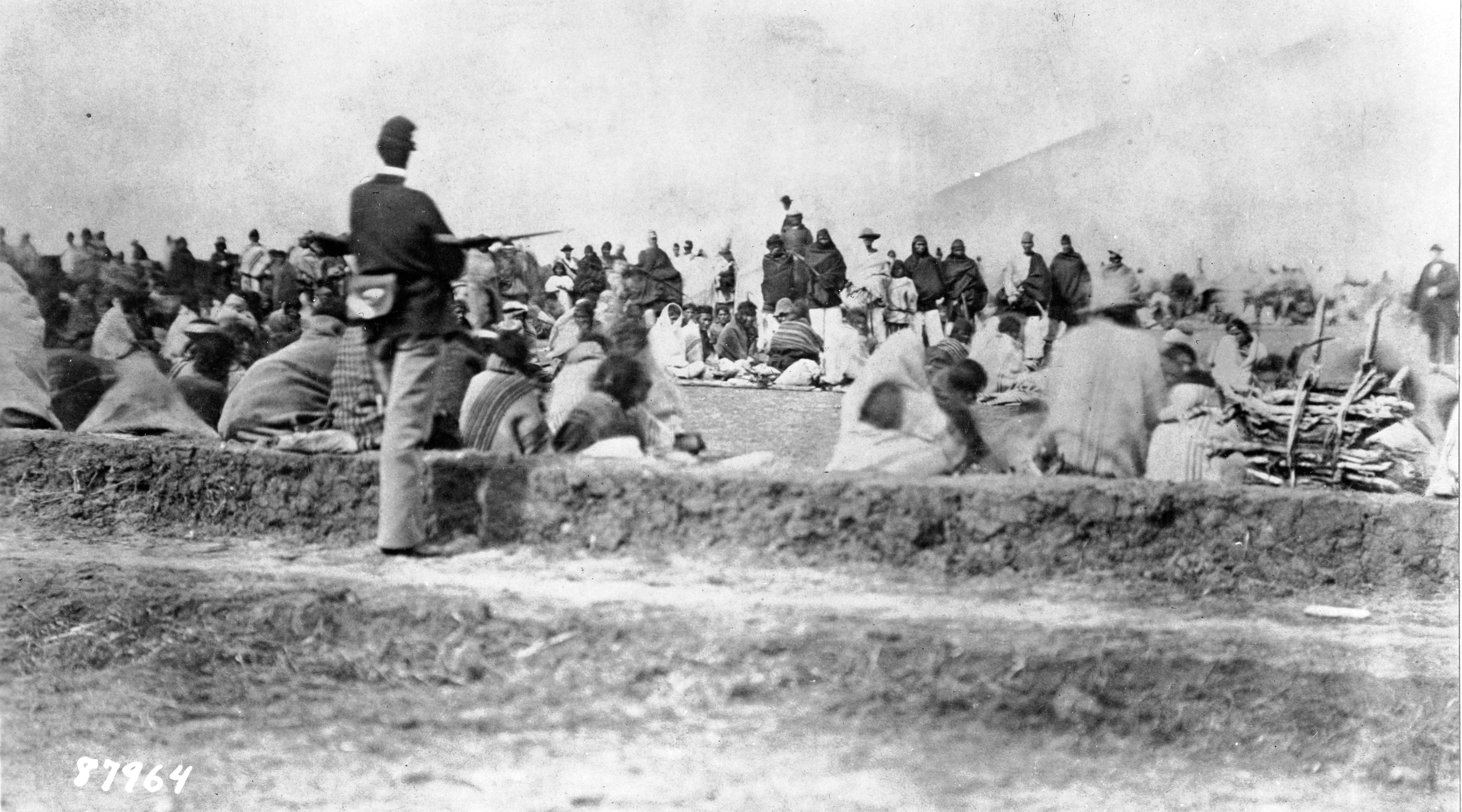
A U.S. soldier stands guard over Navajo people during the Long Walk.

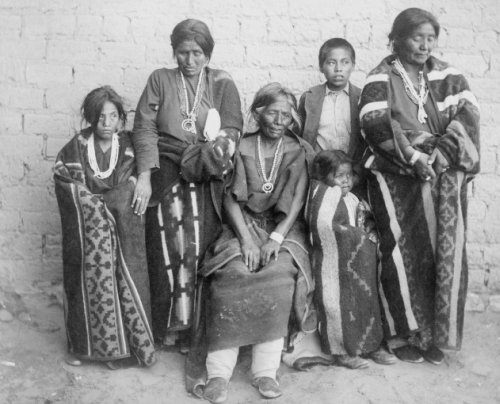
Manuelito family at Bosque Redondo, Fort Sumner, NM. c. 1864

Major General James H. Carleton was assigned to the New Mexico Territory in the fall of 1862. It is then that he would subdue the Navajos of the region and force them on the long walk to Bosque Redondo. Upon being assigned the territory, Carleton set boundaries in which the Navajos would not engage in any sort of conflict. They were prohibited from trespassing onto lands, raiding neighboring tribes, and engaging in warfare with both the Spaniards and European Americans. A majority of the Navajos were abiding by these requirements, but a band of Navajo freelancing raiding parties broke these rules, for which the entire tribe was penalized. In the eyes of Carleton, he was unsuccessful and enlisted outside resources for aid including famous mountain man Kit Carson.

Carson also enlisted neighboring tribes in aiding his campaign to capture as many Navajos as he could. One tribe that proved to be especially useful was the Utes. The Utes were very knowledgeable of the lands of the Navajos and were very familiar with Navajo strongholds as well. Carson launched his full-scale assault on the Navajo population in January 1864. He destroyed everything in his path, eradicating the way of life of the Navajo people. Hogans were burned to the ground, livestock was killed off, and irrigated fields were destroyed. Navajos who surrendered were taken to Fort Canby and those who resisted were murdered. Some Navajos were able to escape Carson's campaign but were soon forced to surrender due to starvation and the freezing temperature of the winter months.

The "Long Walk" started at the beginning of spring 1864. Bands of Navajo led by the Army were relocated from their traditional lands in eastern Arizona Territory and western New Mexico Territory to Fort Sumner (in an area called the Bosque Redondo or Hwéeldi by the Navajo) in the Pecos River valley (Bosque Redondo is Spanish for "round forest"—in New Mexican Spanish a bosque means a river-bottom forest usually containing cottonwood trees). The march was very difficult and pushed many Navajos to their breaking point. Many began the walk exhausted and malnourished, while others were not properly clothed and were not in the least prepared for such a long journey. They were also treated cruelly by the soldiers leading the march. They were never informed as to where they were going, why they were being relocated, or how long it would take to get there. One account passed through generations within the Navajos shows the attitude of the U.S. Army:

It was said that those ancestors were on the Long Walk with their daughter, who was pregnant and about to give birth [...] the daughter got tired and weak and couldn't keep up with the others or go further because of her condition. So my ancestors asked the Army to hold up for a while and to let the woman give birth, but the soldiers wouldn't do it. They forced my people to move on, saying that they were getting behind the others. The soldier told the parents that they had to leave their daughters behind. "Your daughter is not going to survive, anyway; sooner or later she is going to die," they said in their own language. "Go ahead," the daughter said to her parents, "things might come out all right with me," But the poor thing was mistaken, my grandparents used to say. Not long after they had moved on, they heard a gunshot from where they had been a short time ago.

At least 200 died during the 18-day, 300-mile (500-km) trek. Between 8,000 and 9,000 people were settled on an area of 40 square miles (100 km^{2}), with a peak population of 9,022 by the spring of 1865.

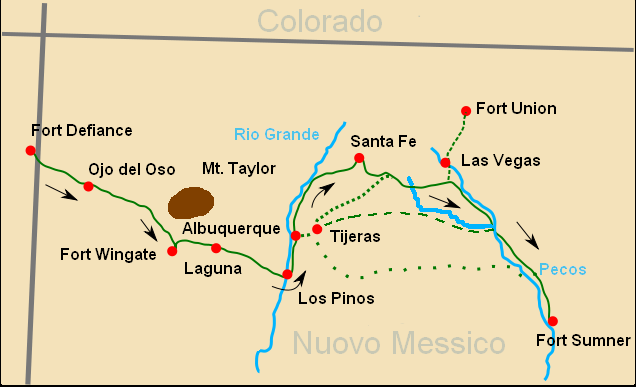
Long Walk Trails

There were as many as 50 groups taking one of seven known routes. They each took a different path but were on the same trail. When returning to the Navajo lands, they reformed their group to become one; this group was ten miles (16 km) long. Some of these Navajos escaped and hid with Apaches that were running from Gen. Crook on what is known as Cimmaron Mesa southeast of present-day NM Highway 6 and I-40; later they relocated to Alamo Springs northwest of Magdalena, NM and are known as the Alamo Band of the Diné (Navajos). Nelson Anthony Field who had a trading post made a trip to DC to lobby for a reservation for this Band and it was granted. This Band is part Navajo and part Apache.

=== Slavery ===
The campaign to subdue the Navajo by the Army was supplemented by raids by New Mexican and Ute slavers who fell on isolated bands of Navajo, killing the men, taking the women and children captive, and capturing horses and livestock. During the army campaign the Ute scouts attached to the army unit engaged in this activity and left destruction of Navajo infrastructure to the main army unit. Following the surrender of the Navajo, the Utes continued to raid the Navajo as did New Mexican slavers. A large number of slaves were taken and sold throughout the region.

== Bosque Redondo ==
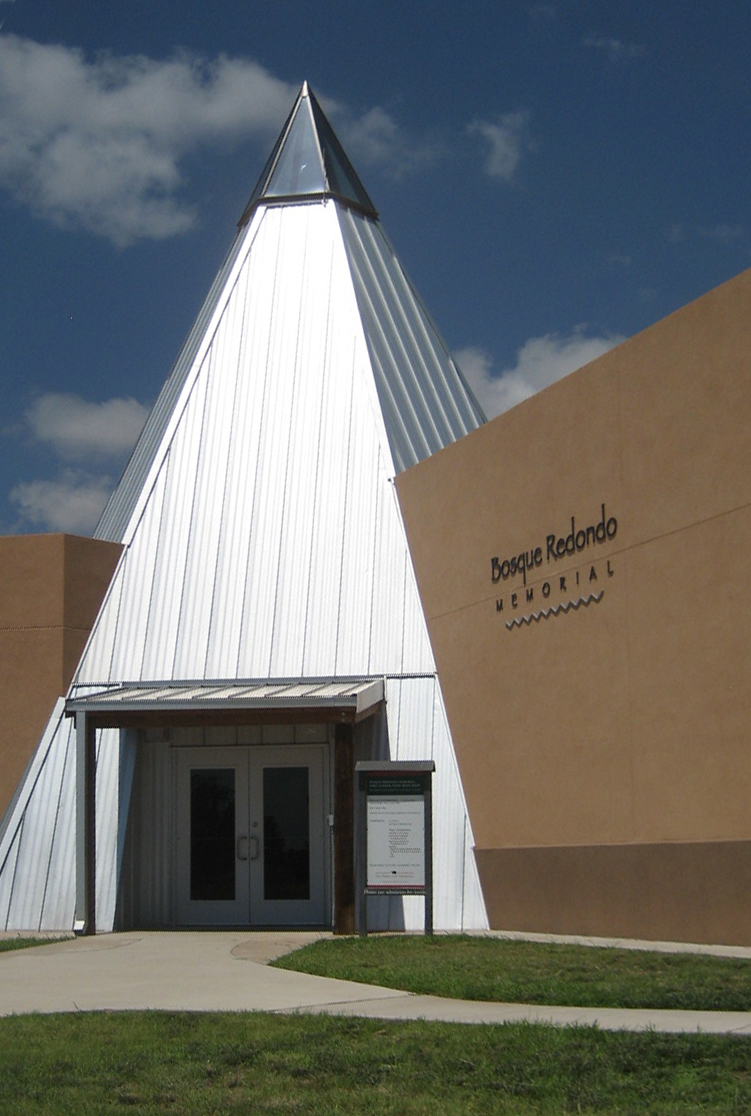
Bosque Redondo Memorial

Like some internment camps involving several tribes, the Bosque Redondo had serious problems. About 400 Mescalero Apaches were placed there before the Navajos. The Mescaleros and the Navajo had a long tradition of raiding each other; the two tribes had many disputes during their encampment. Upon arriving at Bosque Redondo, it was forbidden for the Navajo to speak their native language or practice any cultural customs. Furthermore, the initial plan was for around 5,000 people, nowhere near the 10,000 men, women, and children who eventually resided in the camp. Water and firewood were major issues from the start; the water was brackish, and the round grove of trees was quite small. Nature and humans (hostile tribes raiding the Navajo farmers) both caused crop failures every year. The corn crop, barely growing in the alkali soil was infested with army worms and failed repeatedly. The Pecos River flooded and washed out the head gates of the irrigation system. In 1865 Navajo began escaping. By 1867 the remaining Navajo refused to plant a crop. Comanches raided them frequently, and they raided the Comanche, once stealing over 1,000 horses. The non-Indian settlers also suffered from the raiding parties who were trying to feed their starving people on the Bosque Redondo. There was inept management of the supplies purchased for the reservation. The army spent as much as $1.5 million a year to feed the Native Americans. In 1868 the experiment—meant to be the first Indian reservation west of Indian Territory—was abandoned. A memorial site honoring those who were incarcerated at Bosque Redondo is located at Fort Sumner, New Mexico.

== Treaty of Bosque Redondo ==
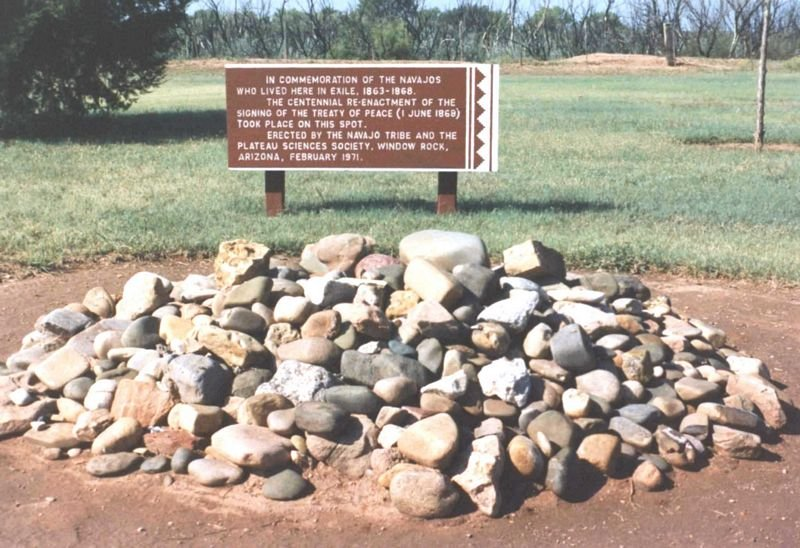
Marker where the Treaty of June 1, 1868, was signed

The Treaty of Bosque Redondo between the United States and many of the Navajo leaders was concluded at Fort Sumner on June 1, 1868. Some of the provisions included establishing a reservation, restrictions on raiding, a resident Indian Agent and agency, compulsory education for children, the supply of seeds, agricultural implements and other provisions, rights of the Navajos to be protected, establishment of railroads and forts, compensation to tribal members, and arrangements for the return of Navajos to the reservation established by the treaty. The Navajo agreed for ten years to send their children to school and the U.S. government agreed to establish schools with teachers for every thirty Navajo children. The U.S. government also promised for ten years to give to the Navajos annually: clothing, goods, and other raw materials, not exceeding the value of five dollars per person, that the Navajos could not manufacture for themselves.

The signers of the document were: W. T. Sherman (Lt. General), S. F. Tappan (Indian Peace Commissioner), Navajos Barboncito (Chief), Armijo, Delgado, Manuelito, Largo, Herrero, Chiquito, Muerte de Hombre, Hombro, Narbono, Narbono Segundo and Ganado Mucho. Those who attested the document included Theo H. Dodd (Indian Agent) and B. S. Roberts (General 3rd Cav).

== Return and end of Long Walk ==
After relating 20 pages of material concerning the Long Walk, Howard Gorman, age 73 at the time, concluded:

As I have said, our ancestors were taken captive and driven to Hwéeldi for no reason at all. They were harmless people, and, even to date, we are the same, holding no harm for anybody...Many Navajos who know our history and the story of Hwéeldi say the same.

— Navajo Stories of the Long Walk Period

== Legacy ==
=== Health effects ===
Not all the Navajo were captured and forced to take the long walk. Geneticists believe that a genetic bottleneck developed among the small, isolated, uncaptured groups. This produced the consequence of otherwise rare genetic diseases, for example xeroderma pigmentosum, stemming from recessive genes achieving greater dominance. An alternative put forth by some Navajo is that the sudden rise of xeroderma pigmentosum is directly related to widespread contamination from uranium mining.

=== In art ===
Navajo artist Richard K. Yazzie created a mural entitled Long Walk Home for the city of Gallup, New Mexico. It is located at the intersection of Third and Hill streets. It is rendered in the four "sacred colors", black, white, blue and yellow.

=== In music ===
A famous song was composed by the Navajo when they were set free about their return to their homeland, Shí naashá (I am going).

A song by Chucki Begay and the Mother Earth Blues Band chronicles the genocide, exodus and return from Fort Sumner

=== In literature ===
Beverly Bird's historical romance novel, Comes the Rain (1990), tells the story of the fighting that preceded the Long Walk as well as the match and internment, ending as the Diné return home.

A supposed remnant of the Long Walk from Bosque Redondo, a rug called Woven Sorrow, figures prominently as a valuable antique in the plot of The Shape Shifter by Tony Hillerman, published in 2006. Anne Hillerman mentioned the Long Walk in a subsequent novel in the series, Cave of Bones (2018) and again in The Tale Teller (2019).

The story of the forced relocation is the setting of the youth fiction novel The Girl Who Chased Away Sorrow, written in 1999 by Ann Turner.

Scott O'Dell's Sing Down the Moon (1970) depicts the forced migration of the Navajos to Bosque Redondo.

== Gallery ==
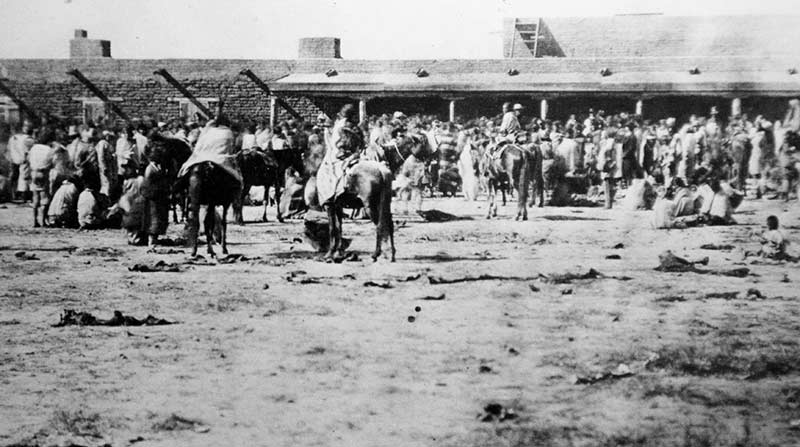
Long Walk of the Navajo, 1864

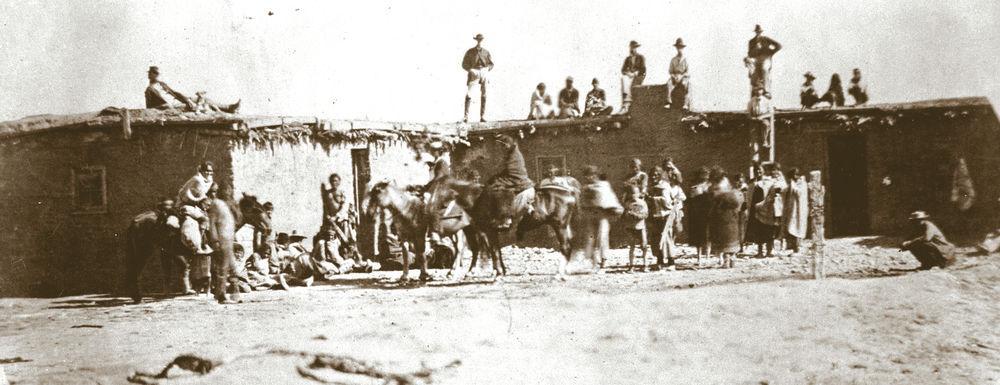
Navajo captives at Fort Sumner, c. 1860s

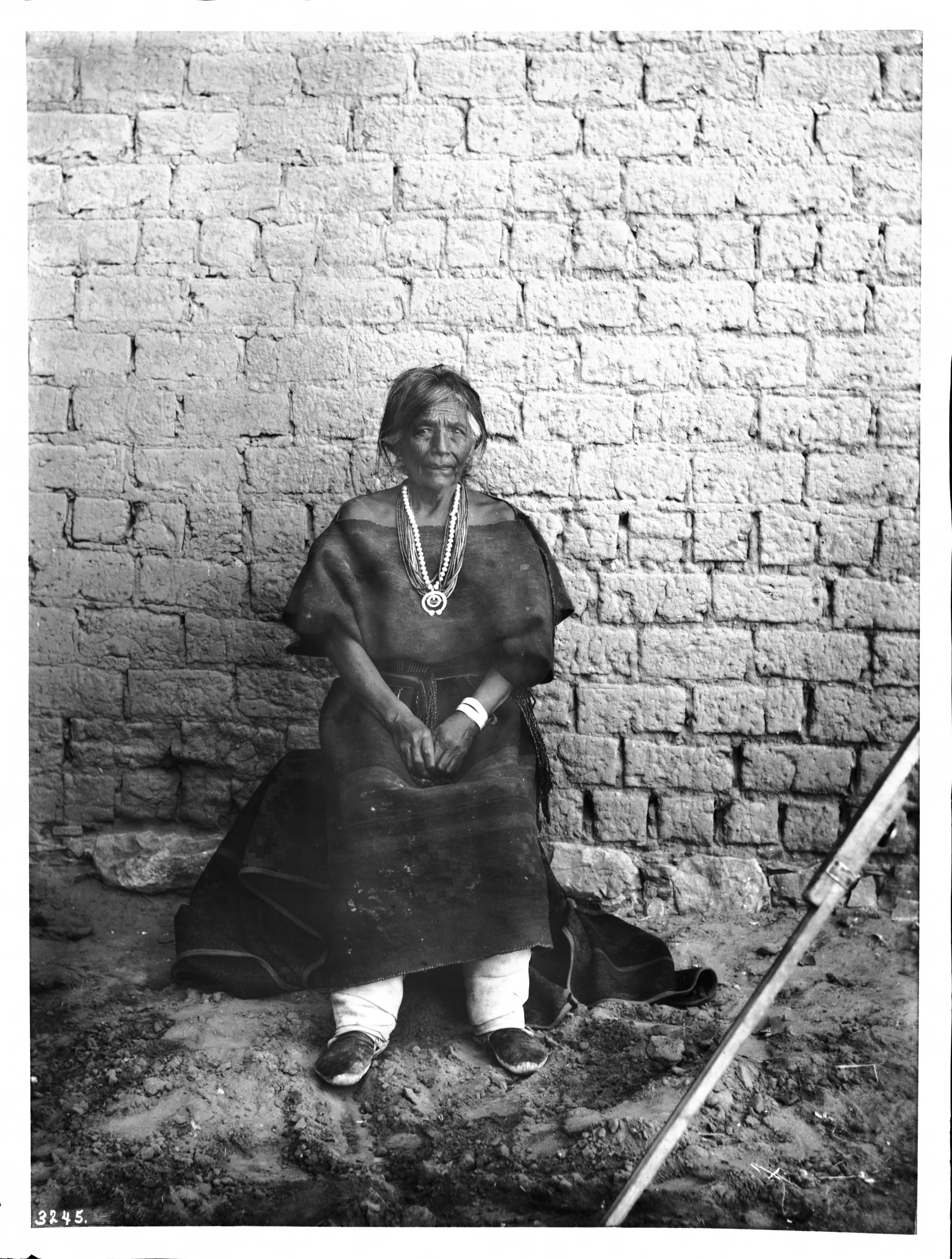
Wife of Navajo Chief Manuelito, the last Navajo chief, c. 1900

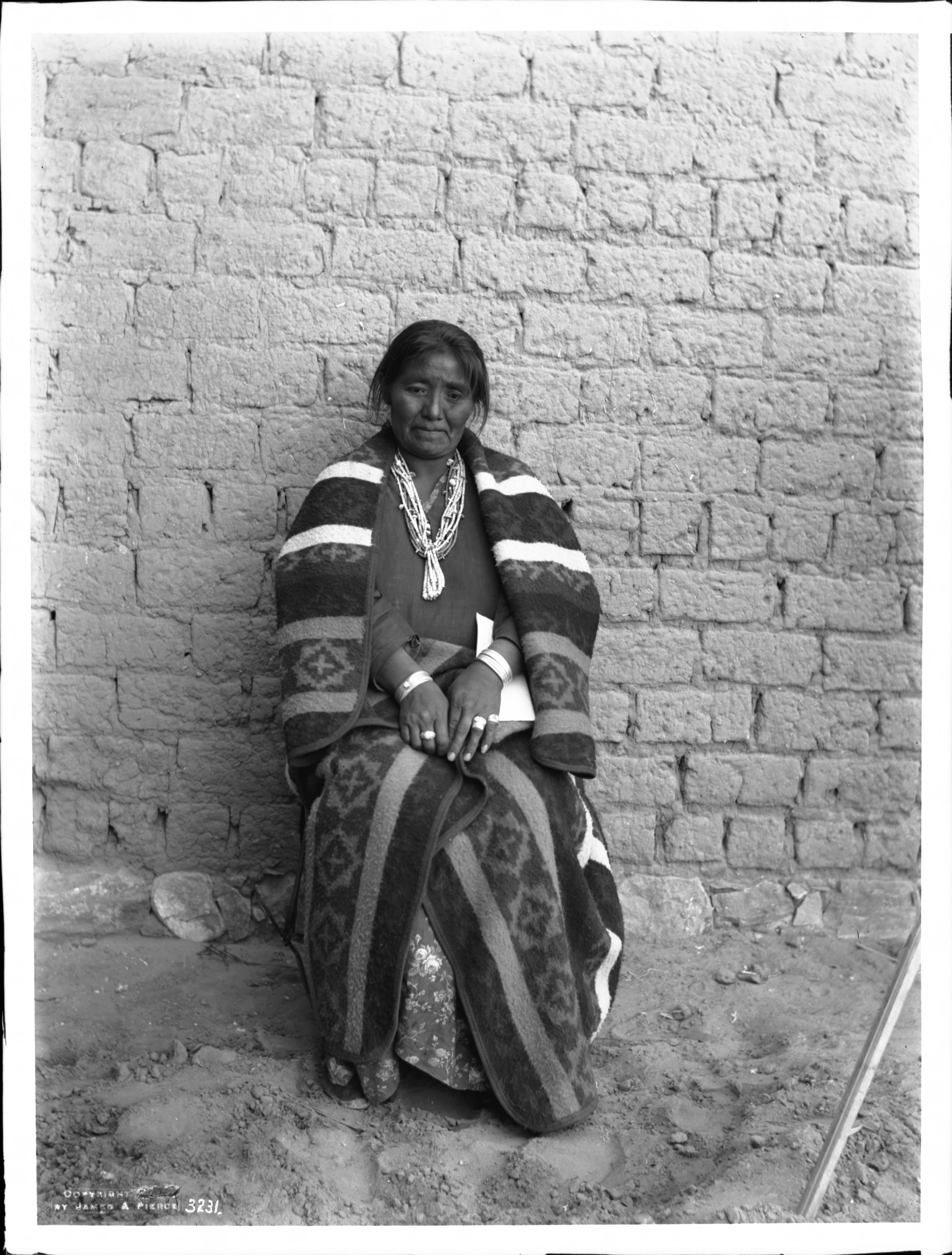
Daughter of Navajo Chief Manuelito, c. 1901

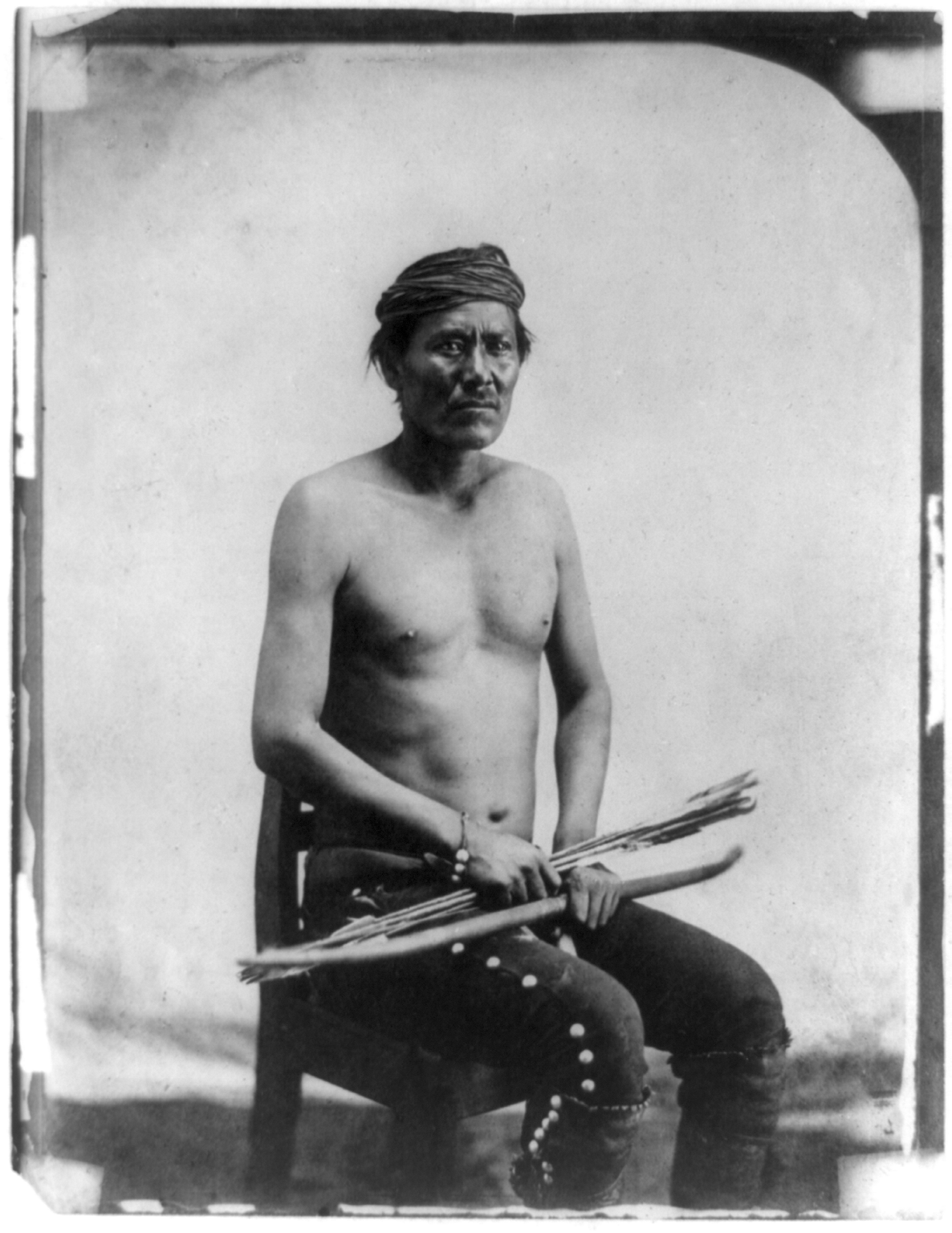
Manuelito, portrait by John Gaw Meem, c. 1901

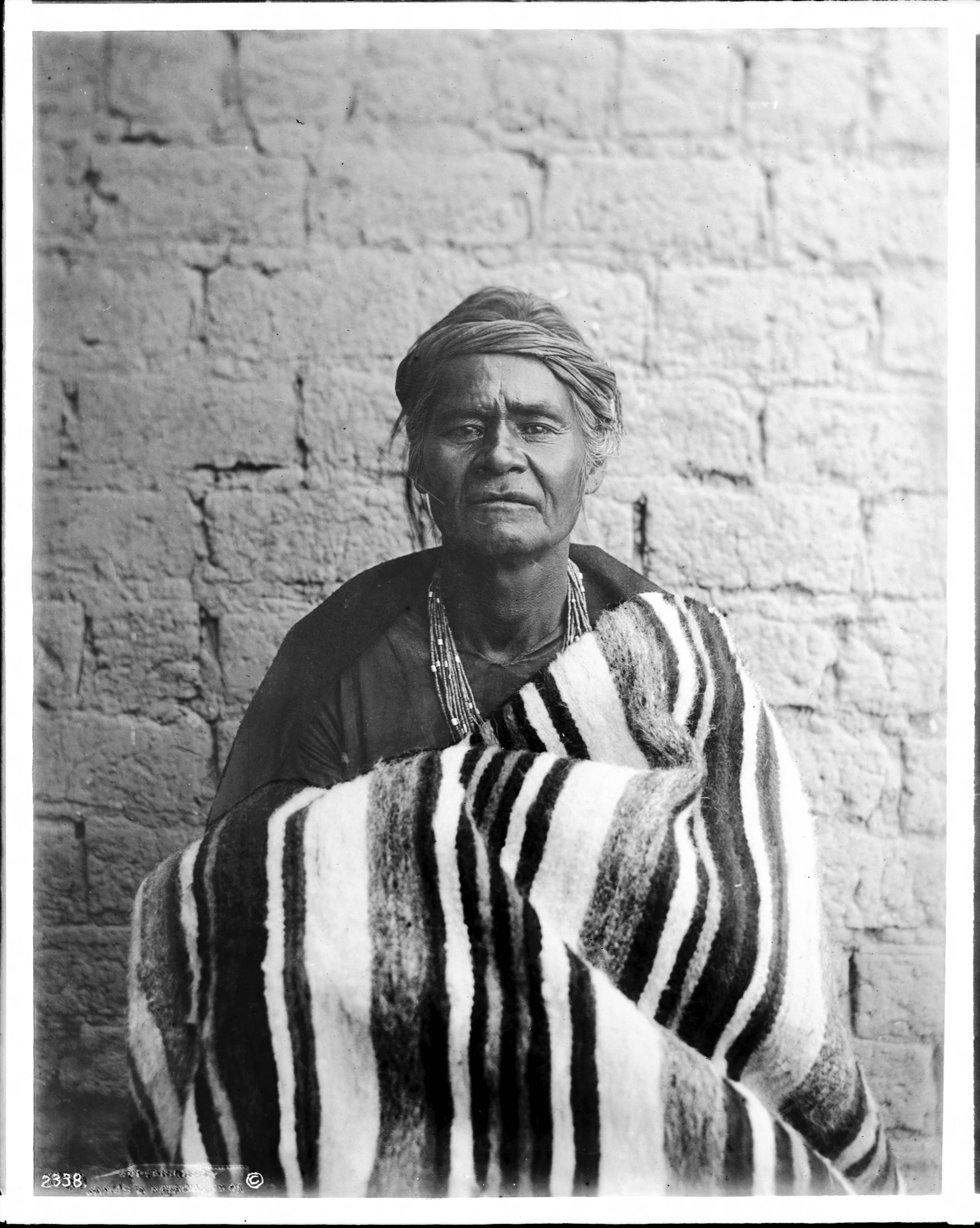
Portrait of son-in-law of Chief Manuelito, c. 1901

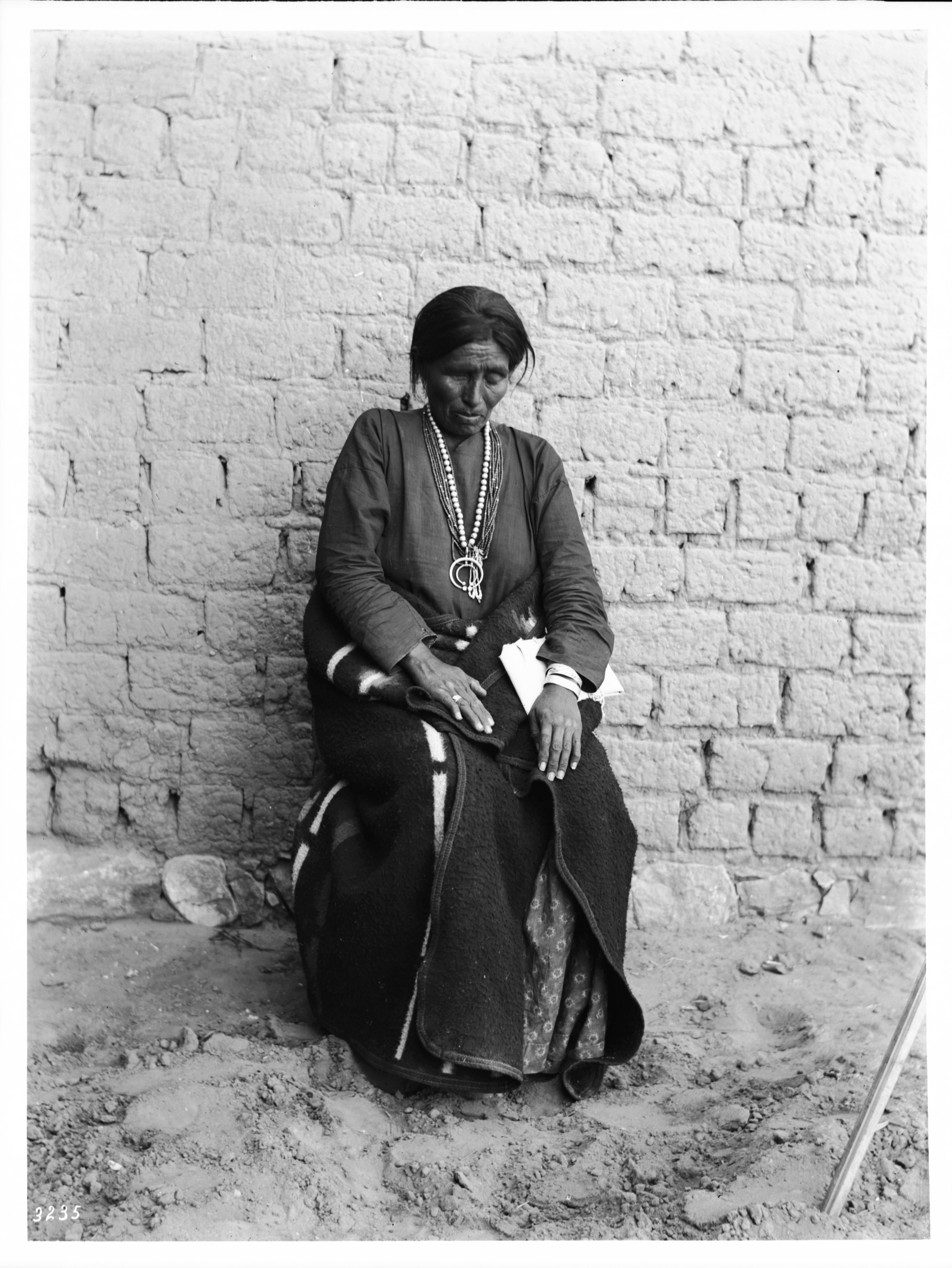
Blind daughter of Chief Manuelito, c. 1901

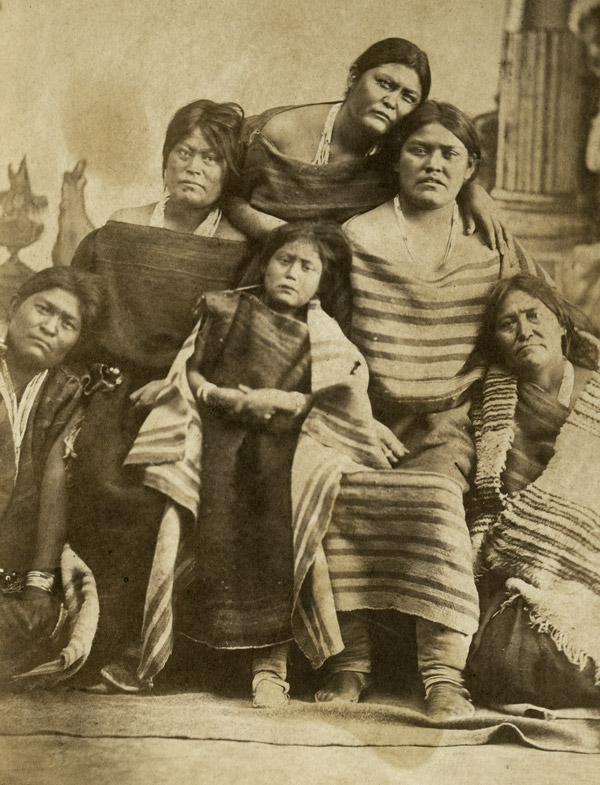
Navajo women, Long Walk of the Navajo

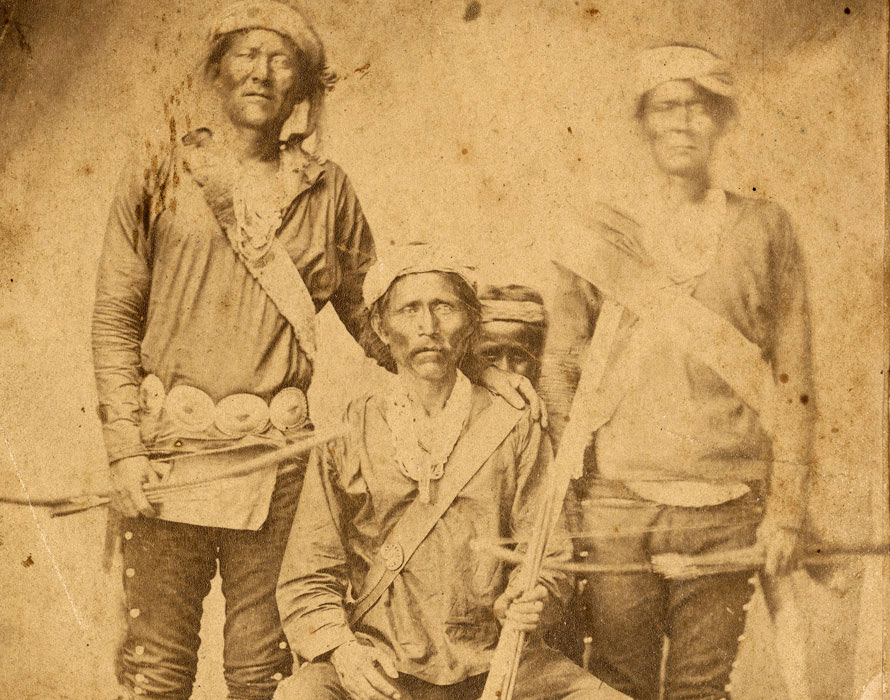
Navajo leaders – Long walk of the Navajo

== See also ==
- California Genocide
- Trail of Tears
- Indian removal
- 1837 Great Plains smallpox epidemic
- Comanche campaign
- Yavapai Wars
- Northern Cheyenne Exodus
- Nakba
- Deterritorialization
- Death March

== Bibliography ==
- Bailey, Lynn R. (1970). Bosque Redondo: An American Concentration Camp. Pasadena, California: Socio-Technical Books.
- Bial, Raymond (2003). Great Journeys: The Long Walk – The Story of Navajo Captivity. New York: Benchmark Books. ISBN 978-0-7614-1322-6.
- Brown, Dee (1970). Bury My Heart at Wounded Knee. Pan Books. ISBN 978-0-330-23219-7.
- Kelly, Lawrence (1970). Navajo Roundup: Selected Correspondence of Kit Carson's expedition Against the Navajo, 1863–1865. Colorado: Pruett Publishing Company. ISBN 978-0-87108-042-4.
- McNitt, Frank (1972). Navajo Wars. Colorado: Univ. New Mexico Press. ISBN 978-0-8263-0051-5.
- Roberts, Susan A. & Calvin A. Roberts (1988). New Mexico. Albuquerque: Univ. New Mexico Press. ISBN 978-0-8263-1145-0.
- Simmons, Marc (1973). The Little Lion of the Southwest: a life of Manuel Antonio Chaves. Chicago: The Swallow Press. ISBN 978-0-8040-0633-0.
- Thompson, Gerald (1976). The Army and the Navajo: The Bosque Redondo Reservation Experiment 1863–1868. Tucson, Arizona: The University of Arizona Press. ISBN 978-0-8165-0495-4.
- Roessel, Ruth, ed. (1973). Navajo Stories of the Long Walk Period. Tsaile, Arizona: Navajo Community College Press. ISBN 978-0-912586-16-8.
- Iverson, Peter (2002). Diné: A History of the Navajos. Albuquerque: Univ. New Mexico Press.
- Cheek, Lawrence W. (2004). The Navajo Long Walk. Tucson: Rio Nuevo Pub.
- The Diné of the Eastern Region of the Navajo Reservation (1990). Oral Stories of the Long Walk. Crownpoint: Lake Valley Navajo School.
