= Lesléa Newman =

American author, editor, and feminist

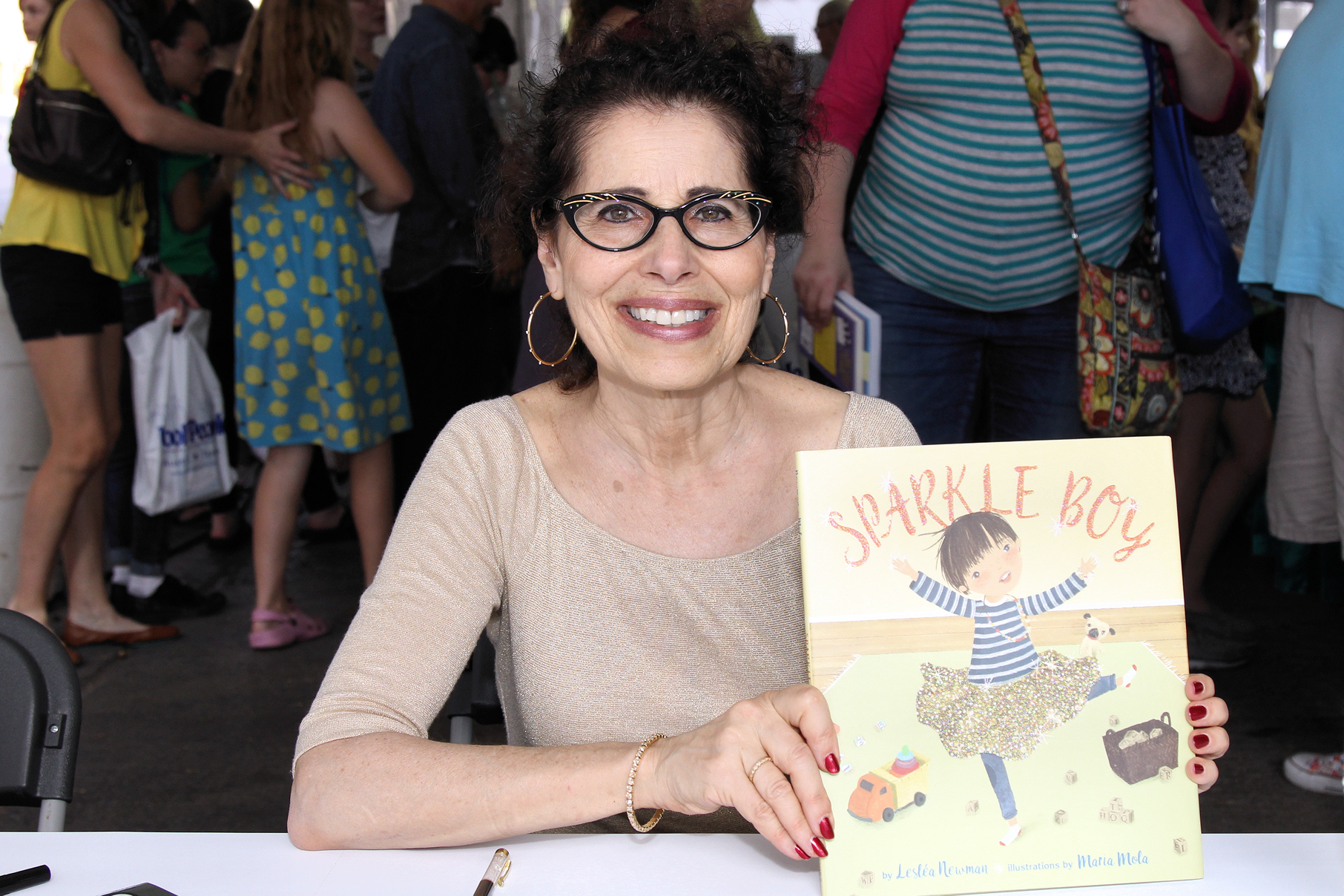
- Newman at the 2017 Texas Book Festival
- Born: November 5, 1955 (age 70); Brooklyn, New York City
- Education: University of Vermont; Naropa Institute
- Occupation: Author
- Notable work: Heather Has Two Mommies
- Awards: Alice Award (2009); Parents' Choice Award (2015); National Jewish Book Award (2019)

Lesléa Newman [lɛzˈ liˌə] (born November 5, 1955, in Brooklyn, New York City) is an American author, editor, and feminist best known for the children's book Heather Has Two Mommies. Four of her young adult novels have been finalists for the Lambda Literary Award for Children's and Young Adult Literature, making her one of the most celebrated authors in the category.

== Personal life ==
Newman was born as Leslie Newman to Jewish parents in New York City in 1955. She developed her pen name by combining her birth name, Leslie, with her Hebrew name, Leah. She started writing poems when she was 8 to cope with her sadness over her family moving from Brooklyn to Long Island. Newman began writing more seriously as a teenager by participating in poetry contests sponsored by Seventeen magazine. She was voted "Class Wit" in high school.

In 1977, Newman spent some time living on Kibbutz Ga'aton in Israel. She attended ulpan, worked on a farm, and volunteered at the children's house. She later visited again as part of a PJ Library program for children's authors.

Newman studied education and poetics at the University of Vermont and Naropa Institute, respectively. She was mentored by Allen Ginsberg in her poetry program. She has cited Ginsberg and poet Grace Paley as two of her greatest influences. While she has written poetry, prose, and nonfiction, she says that poetry has always been her first love as a writer.

Her relationship with her parents was strained as a teenager and throughout her early adulthood. Upon moving out, she had very little contact with them for decades, in part because of their "loud and clear" expectation for her to have a traditional heterosexual marriage. She and her parents reconciled after her mother had a health crisis that left her hospitalized for 10 days. Newman stayed until her mother was well enough to be discharged, after which point the two "could[n't] remember what [they] had ever fought about." After her release, the two maintained a close relationship. They called daily and visited frequently. She was her mother's primary caregiver in the months before her death. Shortly before dying, her mother gave her permission to write about the experience on the condition that "I'll never have to read it." After her mother's death from bladder cancer and COPD, she published a poetry collection about her, titled I Carry My Mother.

Newman stayed with her father for several weeks after her mother's death, as he struggled to take care of himself. Her father died five years later, after a year in an assisted living facility. There was no clear cause of death, and he had been given a clean bill of health just a week prior. Newman believes that it was his grief that killed him. She dedicated a poetry collection to him as well, titled I Wish My Father.

Her work is influenced by her Jewish values and upbringing. She is particularly motivated by the value of tikkun olam, the obligation to repair the world. That value is part of the reason that she has chosen to dedicate much of her work to groups that are underrepresented in children's literature, particularly Jewish and lesbian families, to help those children feel like they belong. Newman's commitment to social justice has brought together her Jewish and lesbian identities. She has stated that everything she writes is influenced by her Judaism. She had little Jewish education as a child, but she became Bat Mitzvah at the age of 48.

Newman lives in Holyoke, Massachusetts with her wife, Mary Vazquez, "a Puerto Rican ex-nun," and their cat. She served as the poet laureate of Northampton from 2008-2010. Newman came out as a lesbian in the early 1980s and married Vazquez in a "commitzvah" ceremony in 1989, before gay marriage was legally recognized.

== Career ==
Lesléa Newman has written and edited 70 books and anthologies. She has written about such topics as being a Jew, body image and eating disorders, lesbianism, lesbian and gay parenting, and her gender role as a femme. She has made a point throughout her career to write about underrepresented groups. Some of her earliest works, written shortly after she came out, are about Jewish lesbians. She later became known for her children's literature featuring LGBT and Jewish themes.

Newman's short story A Letter to Harvey Milk has been adapted into a musical.

Her best-known work is the controversial Heather Has Two Mommies. Newman wrote the book when approached by a lesbian family in her neighborhood who lamented the fact that there were no books they could give their daughter that featured families like theirs. She was repeatedly advised to publish the book under a pen name in anticipation of the backlash, but declined.

She was later the subject of another similar controversy in 1997, when her book Belinda's Bouquet was banned by School District 36 Surrey in Surrey, British Columbia, alongside Johnny Valentine's One Dad, Two Dads, Brown Dad, Blue Dads and Rosamund Elwin and Michele Paulse's Asha's Mums. That ban was eventually overturned by the Supreme Court of Canada in its 2002 decision Chamberlain v Surrey School District No 36.

She also authored The Boy Who Cried Fabulous and Hachiko Waits in 2004.

In 1998, Newman was invited to be the keynote speaker for the University of Wyoming's Gay Awareness Week. She had intended to discuss the backlash to Heather Has Two Mommies. Two days before she was scheduled to speak, the president of the LGBT Student Organization called to tell her that fellow member Matthew Shepard had been attacked and was not found for 18 hours, at which point he was in a coma. He offered to let her cancel her appearance, but she felt it was important to come. Shepard, who was on the committee that selected her, died the morning of that Newman's appearance. Committee members had left an empty seat for him in the front row. In her remarks, she promised attendees that she would do all she could to keep his memory alive. Newman was deeply affected by his death and continues to open all lectures on LGBT rights within a dedication to him. She has written two books about Shepard: October Mourning: A Song for Matthew Shepard, a collection of 60 poems exploring his death and its impact, and Always Matt, a book-length poem for teens. She wrote Always Matt when asked by the Matthew Shepard Foundation to write something about Shepard's life for young readers.

Newman has taught creative writing at several universities as well as private workshops. She is a faculty member of the School of Writing at Spalding University. Newman gives presentations at schools, libraries, and conferences on topics including Matthew Shepard, her experience as a lesbian Jew, gender stereotypes in children's literature, censorship of LGBT literature, and HIV/AIDS.

She often incorporates Yiddish words and phrases into her work. She heard lots of Yinglish growing up in Brooklyn, particularly from her grandmothers, and says that she does her most authentic writing when she incorporates it.

== Selected publications ==
=== Heather Has Two Mommies ===
Heather Has Two Mommies, originally published in 1989 by Alyson Books and illustrated by Diana Souza, is about a young girl who has lesbian mothers. The book was republished by Candlewick Press in 2015. In 1990, many gay and lesbian couples and their children found the first reflections of their families in this picture book.

However, Heather Has Two Mommies has faced a lot of controversy. The book has landed on the American Library Association's Top 100 Most Banned and Challenged Books between 1990 and 1999 (7), as well as between 2010 and 2019 (87).

In the late Nineties, the Wichita Falls library district faced harsh backlash from library-card holders "petition[ed] the city to move controversial materials out of the municipal library's children's section." Questionable material included Heather Has Two Mommies and Daddy's Roommate by Michael Willhoite. In 2000, a federal judge ruled that the petition was unconstitutional.

Despite controversy, the book received a favorable review from School Library Journal and has received the following accolades:

- American Library Association Rainbow List pick (2016)
- Lambda Literary Award for Children/Young Adult nominee

=== Saturday Is Pattyday (1993) ===
Saturday is Pattyday, originally published in 1993 and illustrated by Annette Hegel, is a book about Frankie, whose two moms get divorced. The book was republished by New Victoria on December 13, 2010.

The book was nominated for the Lambda Literary Award for Children's/Young Adult Literature.

== Awards ==
Lesléa Newman's literary awards include Creative Writing Fellowships from the National Endowment for the Arts and the Massachusetts Artists Foundation, the James Baldwin award for Cultural Achievement, the Dog Writers Association of America's Best Book of Fiction Award, and a Parents' Choice Silver Medal. Nine of her books have been Lambda Literary Award finalists. In 2009 she received the Alice B. Award. Her set of children's picture books Mommy, Mama, and Me and Daddy, Papa and Me were 2010 Stonewall Honor Books as well as her 2013 October Mourning: A Song for Matthew Shepherd. In 2019, she received a National Jewish Book Award for Gittel's Journey: An Ellis Island Story. In 2023, she was named one of The Advocate's Advocates of the Year.

In 2009, she was the inaugural judge of the Naugatuck River Review Narrative Poetry Prize.

== Bibliography ==
=== Juvenile fiction ===
- Heather Has Two Mommies. Illustrated by Laura Cornell. Alyson Press. 1989.
  - American Library Association Rainbow List pick (2016)
  - Lambda Literary Award for Children/Young Adult nominee
- Belinda's Bouquet. Illustrated by Michael WIllhoite. Alyson Wonderland. 1991.
- Gloria Goes to Gay Pride. Illustrated by Russell Crocker. Alyson Wonderland. 1991.
  - Lambda Literary Award for Children's/Young Adult
- Saturday is Pattyday. Illustrated by Annette Hegel. 1993.
  - Lambda Literary Award nominee for Children's/Young Adult
- Too Far Away to Touch. Illustrated by Catherine Stock. Clarion Books. December 1995.
- Remember That. Illustrated by Karen Ritz. Clarion Books. February 18, 1996.
- Matzo Ball Moon. Illustrated by Elaine Greenstein. Clarion Books. 1998.
- Cats, Cats, Cats! Illustrated by Erika Oiler. Simon & Schuster Books for Young Readers. 2001.
- Dogs, Dogs, Dogs! Illustrated by Erika Oiler. Simon & Schuster Books for Young Readers. 2002.
- Felicia's Favorite Story. Illustrated by Adriana Romo. Two Lives Publ. 2002.
  - Lambda Literary Award nominee for Children's/Young Adult
- Pigs, Pigs, Pigs! Illustrated by Erika Oiler. Simon & Schuster Books for Young Readers. 2003
- The Boy Who Cried Fabulous. Illustrated by Peter Ferguson. Tricycle Press. March 15, 2004.
- Where Is Bear? Illustrated by Valeri Gorbachev. HMH Books. October 2004. ISBN 978-1-32-856122-0.
- Hachiko Waits. Illustrated by Machiyo Kodaira. Henry Holt and Company. October 2004.
- A Fire Engine for Ruthie. Illustrated by Cyd Moore. Clarion Books. 2004.
- The Best Cat in the Word. Illustrated by Ronald Himler. Eerdmans Books for Young Readers. 2004.
- The Eight Nights of Chanukah. Illustrated by Elivia Savadier. Harry N. Abrams. October 2005.
- Skunk's Spring Surprise. Illustrated by Valeri Gorbachev. Houghton Mifflin Harcourt. January 1, 2007.
- Daddy's Song. Illustrated by Karen RItz. Henry Holt and Company. April 17, 2007.
- Runaway Dreidel! Illustrated by Krysten Broker. Square Fish. October 2, 2007.
- Daddy, Papa, and Me. illustrated by Carol Thompson. Tricycle Press. June 9, 2009.
  - Stonewall Book Award Nominee for Children's and Young Adult Literature (2010)
- Mommy, Mama, and Me. Illustrated by Carol Thompson. Tricycle Press. June 9, 2009.
  - Stonewall Book Award Nominee for Children's and Young Adult Literature (2010)
- Just Like Mama. Illustrated by Julia Gorton. Harry N. Abrams. April 2010.
- harMiss Tutu's Star. Illustrated by Carey Armstrong-Ellis. Harry N. Abrams. August 1, 2010.
- Donovan's Big Day. Tricycle Press. 2011. ISBN 978-1-58-246332-2.
- A Sweet Passover. Illustrated by David Slonim. ABRAMS. March 2012.
- A Kiss on the Keppie. Illustrated by Katherine Blackmore. Amazon Publishing. 2012.
- Here Is the World: A Year of Jewish Holidays. Illustrated by Susan Gal. ABRAMS. September 2, 2014.
- My Name is Aviva. Lerner Publishing Group. August 2015.
- Ketzel, the Cat who Composed Illustrated by Amy June Bates. Candlewick Press. 2015.
  - Association of Jewish Libraries Sydney Taylor Award Winner (2016)
- Hanukkah Delight! Illustrated by Amy Husband. Lerner Publishing Group.. 2016.
- Sparkle Boy. Illustrated by Maria Mola. Lee & Low Books Incorporated. 2017.
- Baby's Blessings. Lerner Publishing Group. October 2019. ISBN 9781-5-41-565913-.
- Gittel's Journey: An Ellis Island Story. Illustrated by Amy June Bates. ABRAMS. February 5, 2019.
- Welcoming Elijah: A Passover with a Tale. Illustrated by Susan Gal. Charlesbridge Publishing, Incorporated. January 28, 2020.
  - National Jewish Book Award for Children's Picture Books
  - Golden Kite Award nominee for Picture Book Illustration
- Remembering Ethan. Illustrated by Tracy Nishimura Bishop. American Psychological Association. 2020.
- 1 2 3 Cats: A Cat Counting Book. Illustrated by Isabella Kung. Candlewick Press. April 29, 2021. ISBN 978-1-53-620995-2.
- ABC Cats: An Alpha-Cat Book. Illustrated by Isabella Kung. Candlewick Press. May 4, 2021.
- As Babies Dream. Illustrated by Taia Morley. American Psychological Association. 2021.
- Alicia and the Hurricane: A Story of Puerto Rico with Georgina Lazaro Leon. Illustrated by Elizabeth Erazo Baez. Children's Book Press. March 2022.

=== Young Adult Fiction ===
- Good Enough to Eat: A Novel. Firebrand Books. 1986.
- Fat Chance. Livewire. 1994.
- Jailbait. Delacorte Press. 2005.

=== Adult fiction ===
- In Every Laugh a Tear: A Novel. New Victoria Publishers. 1992.
- The Reluctant Daughter. Bold Strokes Books. 2009.

=== Short story collections ===
- A Letter to Harvey Milk: Short Stories. University of Wisconsin Press. 1988.
- Secrets: Short Stories. New Victoria Publishers. 1990.
- Every Woman's Dream: Short Fiction. New Victoria Publishers. 1994.
- Out of the Closet and Nothing to Wear. University of California. 1997.
- Girls Will be Girls: A Novella and Short Stories. Alyson Books. 2000.
- She Loves Me, She Loves Me Not: Romantic Fiction. Alyson Books. 2002.
- The Best Short Stories of Leslea Newman. Alyson Books. 2003.

=== Poetry collections ===
- Love Me Like You Mean It: Poems. The University of California. 1987.
- Sweet Dark Places. Windstorm Collective. 1991.
- Still Life with Buddy: A Novel Told in Fifty Poems. Pride Publications. 1997.
- The Little Butch Book. New Victoria Publishers. 1998.
  - Lambda Literary Award Nominee for Lesbian Poetry
- Signs of Love. Windstorm Creative. 2000.
  - Lambda Literary Award Nominee for Lesbian Poetry
- Nobody's Mother. Orchard House Press. November 2008.
- October Mourning: A Song for Matthew Shepard. Candlewick Press. September 25, 2012.
  - Goodreads Choices Award Nominee for Poetry
- I Remember: Hachiko Speaks. Finishing Line Press. September 19, 2013.
- I Carry My Mother. Headmistress Press. January 2, 2015.
- Lovely. Headmistress Press. January 2, 2018.
- I Wish My Father. Headmistress Press. January 2, 2021.

=== Nonfiction ===
- SomeBody to Love: A Guide to Loving the Body You Have. Third Side Press. 1991.
- Eating Our Hearts Out: Personal Accounts of Women's Relationship to Food. Crossing Press. March 1, 1993.
- The Femme Mystique. Alyson Books. June 1, 1995.
- Write from the Heart: Inspiration and Exercises for Women who Want to Write. Ten Speed Press. 2003.

=== Editor ===
- A Loving Testimony: Remembering Loved Ones Lost to AIDS: An Anthology. Crossing Press. April 11, 1995.
  - Lambda Literary Award Nominee for Anthologies/Nonfiction (1996)
- My Lover is a Woman. Ballantine Books. 1996.
- Pillow Talk: Lesbian Stories Between the Covers. Alyson Books. May 1, 1998.
- Pillow Talk II: More Lesbian Stories Between the Covers. Alyson Books. July 1, 2000.
- Bedroom Eyes: Stories of Lesbians in the Boudoir. Alyson Books. November 1, 2002.
- Sappho (Gay & Lesbian Writers Series). Chelsea House Pub. March 1, 2005.

=== Contributor ===
- Women on Women: An Anthology of American Lesbian Short Fiction. Plume. May 30, 1990.
- Bubbe Meisehs by Shayneh Maidelehs: An Anthology of Poetry by Jewish Granddaughters About Our Grandmothers. HerBooks. December 1, 1991.
- Xanadu. Tor Books. March 15, 1994.
- Garden Variety Dykes: Lesbian Traditions in Gardening. HerBooks. April 1, 1994.
- Not the Only One. Alyson Books. January 1, 1995.
- Am I Blue?: Coming Out from the Silence. HarperTeen. April 15, 1995.
  - Stonewall Book Award for Literature (1995)
  - Lambda Literary Award for Young Adult / Children's Book (1995)
  - Minnesota Book Award for Older Children (1995)
- Set in Stone: Butch-On-Butch Erotica. Alyson Books. May 1, 2001.
- Back to Basics: A Butch-Femme Anthology. Bella Books. April 1, 2004.
- Mentsh: On Being Jewish and Queer. Alyson Books. August 15, 2004.
- Becoming Myself: Reflections on Growing Up Female. Hachette Books. April 17, 2007.
- Things Invisible to See. Circlet Press. February 25, 2015.
- HYSTERIA: Writing the Female Body. Lucky Bastard Press. June 15, 2016.
- Conversing with Cancer: How to Ask Questions, Find and Share Information, and Make the Best Decisions. Peter Lang Us. January 17, 2018.
- We Will Not Be Silenced: The Lived Experience of Sexual Harassment and Sexual Assault Told Powerfully Through Poetry, Prose, Essay, and Art. Indie Blu(e) Publishing. November 27, 2018.
- No Voice Too Small: Fourteen Young Americans Making History. Charlesbridge Publishing September 22, 2020.

== See also ==
- Fat Chance
- LGBT culture in New York City
- List of LGBT people from New York City
- NYC Pride March
