= The Boy Who Cried Fabulous =

First edition

The Boy Who Cried Fabulous, published by Tricycle Press in March 2004 (ISBN 1-58246-101-5) is a children's book by Lesléa Newman and is illustrated by Peter Ferguson.

== Plot ==
Visually set in a mid-20th-century America, it is about an enthusiastic boy called Roger who keeps getting sidetracked when walking home or to school by all the "fabulous" things he sees. At first he is scolded by his parents, who forbid the word "fabulous", leading him to come up with other celebratory adjectives. But after a time they come to appreciate their son's unique way of seeing the world.

== Reception ==
The Publishers Weekly review describes Ferguson's "burnished" paintings as depicting a whimsical realm and a Roger reminiscent of Jimmy Olsen.
