= The Girl Who Chased Away Sorrow =

1999 book by Ann Turner

The Girl Who Chased Away Sorrow: The Diary of Sarah Nita, a Navajo Girl, New Mexico, 1864
- First edition
- Author: Ann Turner
- Language: English
- Series: Dear America
- Genre: Young adult fiction
- Publisher: Scholastic Inc.New York
- Publication date: 1999
- Publication place: United States
- Media type: Print
- Pages: 200
- ISBN: 0-590-97216-2
- Dewey Decimal: 813/.54
- LC Class: PZ
- Preceded by: A Light in the Storm
- Followed by: A Coal Miner's Bride

The Girl Who Chased Away Sorrow (1999) is a book by Ann Turner which is part of the Dear America book series. It tells the story of the removal of the Navajos from their land by the U.S. Government – a 400-mile (640 km) forced winter march to Fort Sumner.

== Synopsis ==
The story starts when Sarah Nita and her granddaughter, who is also called Sarah Nita, sit in the shade of their hogan. The elder Sarah Nita wants her daughter to write her story, so her granddaughter gets out the book the white teacher gave to her and starts writing. The first sentence of the book is "My mother bends over the plants near the red mesa..." It tells how Sara Nita's parents are worried because of the white men and how they are trying to steal the Diné's (the Navajo) land.

== Reception ==
School Library Journal wrote that the "story is rich with details of Native life gracefully woven into the telling of events. Characterizations are complete, even for minor participants, and the confusion, fear, and suffering of The People are drawn with clarity and immediacy". In their review, The Booklist said that the author's "use of phrases instead of dates to divide diary entries makes it easy to follow and keep track of major events, and this new addition to the Dear America series is an accessible, forthright view of a sad chapter in American history".

Melissa Thompson wrote in The Lion and the Unicorn that while Turner's "novel is grounded in well-known historical events, and may be well intentioned, it misrepresents the interplay of political forces". Beverly Slapin, executive director of Oyate, a Native organization that critiques and evaluates children's books, harshly criticized the book, stating: "this book doesn't work on any level. Turner clearly knows nothing about Navajo ways of being". Additionally, she opined that the novel has a "misunderstanding of Navajos' strong oral storytelling traditions (no child would take notes while an elder told a story), it has pathetic attempts at Native humor, and whitewashes Native experiences".
