= Moshe Cotel =

American pianist and composer (1943-2008)

Moshe (Morris) Cotel (February 20, 1943 – October 24, 2008) was a pianist and composer whose music was strongly influenced by his Jewish roots. Cotel moved from his Jewish roots to focus on music for most of his life, and received his rabbinic ordination and synagogue pulpit in the years before his death.

== Early life and education ==
Morris Cotel was born February 20, 1943, in Baltimore, and was raised in an Orthodox Jewish family. His parents were Charles and Lena Bormel Cotel. As a youth, Cotel was simultaneously enrolled in the Talmudical Academy of Baltimore and the Peabody Conservatory of the Johns Hopkins University where he studied music and took college-preparatory classes, having enrolled at the age of 9. He wrote a 200-page symphony as a 13-year-old, to the astonishment of his piano teacher at Peabody who did not believe him until he pulled the completed score out of his bag.

He earned bachelor's and master's degrees at the Juilliard School in New York City, in 1964 and 1965 respectively. Cotel won the American Academy in Rome Prize for music composition at age 23, making him one of the youngest recipients of the prize, and studied art in Italy for two years.

== Career ==
Cotel had been a professor of music composition at the Peabody Conservatory in Baltimore from 1972, until he retired in 2000. After moving to New York City in 1977, he retained his position at Peabody, commuting to Baltimore on a weekly basis.

=== Composer and performer ===
A review in The New York Times of a 1977 performance at what is now the Weill Recital Hall at Carnegie Hall, opened with the statement "That Morris Cotel is a composer-pianist of unusual capabilities seems beyond question."

=== Compositions ===
His opera Deronda was based on the title character in George Eliot's novel Daniel Deronda, a Victorian era English Jew who combines proto-Zionism with Kabbalistic ideas. The Fire and the Mountains is a cantata he wrote that memorializes the Holocaust. The choral piece Trope for Orchestra integrated cantillation used in public readings of the Torah in synagogue. His 1985 two-act opera Dreyfus was based on the trial and conviction of the unjustly accused French officer Alfred Dreyfus and the anti-Semitism it aroused in France.

=== Ordination ===
In anticipation of a trip to Germany and Austria for performances of his opera Dreyfus, Cotel engaged the assistance of a Holocaust survivor from Washington Heights, Manhattan to help improve his German language skills. Cotel later met the same woman, who told him that hearing his efforts to spread the story of Alfred Dreyfus had convinced her to return to Judaism. This encounter convinced Cotel to become a rabbi. As Cotel described the encounter, "Without knowing it, I had changed this woman’s life, and she had no idea that she had just changed mine". He enrolled part-time at the Academy for Jewish Religion in Riverdale shortly after his encounter in Washington Heights. He retired from the Peabody Conservatory from his position as chairman of the composition department in 2003 to devote his full-time efforts to his rabbinical studies and received his rabbinic ordination three years later. "My religion changed from Judaism to classical music, and in adulthood it changed back again" were the words Cotel used to describe his transformations.

=== Composition by Ketzel the cat ===
While playing piano in 1996, his 3-year-old cat, Ketzel, jumped on the keyboard. Cotel transcribed the descending paw pattern and entered the score in the Paris New Music Review's One-Minute Competition for pieces under 60 seconds, with Cotel winning honorable mention.

=== Congregational rabbi and death ===
Rabbi Cotel spent his last five years before his death as spiritual leader of Temple Beth El of Manhattan Beach, Brooklyn. Cotel died of natural causes on October 24, 2008, at age 65 in his apartment on the Upper West Side of Manhattan home. His wife found him on the floor wearing his tallit and tefillin for the morning prayer service, and had assumed he was meditating, knowing that he preferred to pray alone each morning for two hours, before realizing that he had died peacefully.

== Family ==
Cotel was married to Aliya and had a son, Sivan, and daughter, Orli.

== Main work ==
Deronda, Opera in Three Acts (1985--1989)

Dreyfuss, Opera in Two Acts (1980–1983)

Trope for Orchestra- choral work

My Shalom, My Peace (poems by Jewish and Arab children) for Treble Chorus, Harp and Percussion (1980)

The Fire and the Mountains for Chorus, Children's Chorus, Soloists and Percussion.(1977) - cantata

Night of the Murdered Poets- premiered in 1978 with actor Richard Dreyfuss as narrator

Chronicles: A Jewish Life and the Classical Piano-

Chronicles II-

Quatrains (5) for mezzo-soprano & chamber orchestra (1960)-

Piece for Piano Four Paws by Ketzel, for piano-
