= Kathleen Krull =

American children's writer (1952–2021)

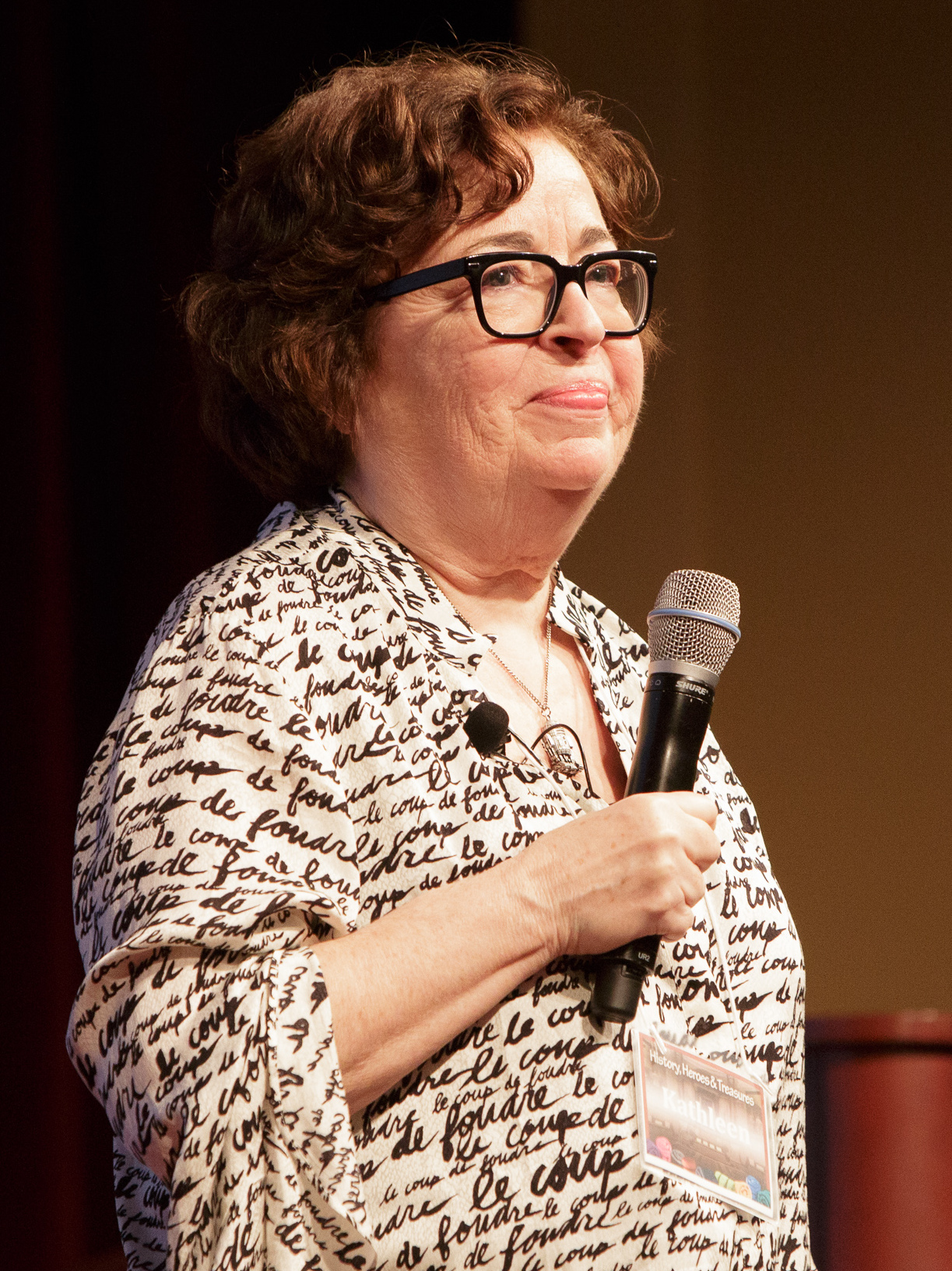
- Krull in 2017
- Born: July 29, 1952; Fort Leonard Wood, Missouri, U.S.
- Died: January 15, 2021 (aged 68); San Diego, California, U.S.
- Education: Northwestern University, Lawrence University
- Alma mater: Lawrence University
- Occupations: Author, book editor
- Spouse: Paul Brewer
- Writing career
- Genre: Children's books
- Subjects: Biography, history

Kathleen Krull (July 29, 1952 – January 15, 2021) was an author of children's books and a former book editor.

== Early life and education ==
Krull was born in Fort Leonard Wood, Missouri, in 1952 and grew up in Wilmette, Illinois. She studied music at Northwestern University in Evanston, Illinois, and then earned a B.A. in 1974 from Lawrence University in Appleton, Wisconsin, magna cum laude, majoring in English, minoring in music.

== Career ==
Krull worked as a children’s book editor for companies in the Midwest, including at Western Publishing from 1974 to 1979, where she edited and wrote books in the Trixie Belden series under the pseudonym of Kathryn Kenny. She moved to San Diego to work as a senior editor at Harcourt Brace Jovanovich, editing authors including Tomie dePaola, Eve Bunting, Patricia Hermes, Anne Lindbergh, Jane Yolen, Arnold Adoff, Amy Schwartz, Judy Delton, and Lael Littke. While at Harcourt, Krull She left publishing in 1984 to establish herself as a children's book author.

She collaborated with Jill Biden on Joey: The Story of Joe Biden, which was released in August 2020 by Simon & Schuster.

Her papers are cataloged at the University of Minnesota's Kerlan Collection.

== Personal life ==
Krull lived in San Diego with her husband, Paul Brewer, a children’s book illustrator and author whom she married in 1989. She died in January 2021 after being diagnosed with cancer.

== Selected works ==
- Lives of the Musicians: Good Times, Bad Times (and What the Neighbors Thought), illustrated by Kathryn Hewitt, Harcourt (San Diego, CA), 1993.
- Louisa May's Battle: How the Civil War Led to Little Women, illustrated by Carlyn Beccia (San Diego, CA), 2012.
- Lives of the Writers: Comedies, Tragedies (and What the Neighbors Thought), illustrated by Kathryn Hewitt, Harcourt (San Diego, CA), 1994.
- V Is for Victory: America Remembers World War II, Knopf (New York, NY), 1995.
- Lives of the Artists: Masterpieces, Messes (and What the Neighbors Thought), illustrated by Kathryn Hewitt, Harcourt (San Diego, CA), 1995.
- Wilma Unlimited: How Wilma Rudolph Became the World's Fastest Woman, illustrated by David Diaz, Harcourt (San Diego, CA), 1996.
- Lives of the Athletes: Thrills, Spills (and What the Neighbors Thought), illustrated by Kathryn Hewitt, Harcourt (San Diego, CA), 1997.
- Wish You Were Here: Emily's Guide to the Fifty States, illustrated by Amy Schwartz, Doubleday (New York, NY), 1997.
- Lives of the Presidents: Fame, Shame (and What the Neighbors Thought), illustrated by Kathryn Hewitt, Harcourt (San Diego, CA), updated edition 2011.
- They Saw the Future: Psychics, Oracles, Scientists, Inventors, and Pretty Good Guessers, illustrated by Kyrsten Brooker, Atheneum (New York, NY), 1999.
- A Kid's Guide to America's Bill of Rights: Curfews, Censorship, and the 100-Pound Giant, illustrated by Anna DiVito, Avon Books (New York, NY), 1999.
- Lives of Extraordinary Women: Rulers, Rebels (and What the Neighbors Thought), illustrated by Kathryn Hewitt, Harcourt (San Diego, CA), 2000.
- M Is for Music, illustrated by Stacy Innerst, Harcourt (Orlando, FL), 2003.
- Harvesting Hope: The Story of Cesar Chavez, illustrated by Yuyi Morales, Harcourt (San Diego, CA), 2003.
- The Boy on Fairfield Street: How Ted Geisel Grew Up to Become Dr. Seuss, illustrated by Steve Johnson and Lou Fancher, Random House (New York, NY), 2004.
- A Woman for President: The Story of Victoria Woodhull, illustrated by Jane Dyer, Walker (New York, NY), 2004.
- Houdini: World's Greatest Mystery Man and Escape King, illustrated by Eric Velasquez, Walker (New York, NY), 2005.
- Pocahontas: Princess of the New World, illustrated by David Diaz, Walker (New York, NY), 2007.
- Fartiste: An Explosively Funny, Mostly True Story, (with Paul Brewer) illustrated by Boris Kulikov, Simon & Schuster (New York, NY), 2008.
- Hillary Rodham Clinton: Dreams Taking Flight, illustrated by Amy June Bates, Simon & Schuster (New York, NY), 2008.
- The Road to Oz: Twists, Turns, Bumps, and Triumphs in the Life of L. Frank Baum, illustrated by Kevin Hawkes, Knopf (New York, NY), 2008.
- The Boy Who Invented TV: The Story of Philo Farnsworth, illustrated by Greg Couch, Knopf (New York, NY), 2009.
- A Boy Named FDR: How Franklin D. Roosevelt Grew up to Change America, illustrated by Steve Johnson and Lou Fancher, Knopf (New York, NY), 2011.
- Kubla Khan: Emperor of Everything, illustrated by Robert Byrd, Viking (New York, NY), 2010.
- Lincoln Tells a Joke: How Laughter Saved the President (and the Country), (with Paul Brewer) illustrated by Stacy Innerst, Houghton Mifflin Harcourt (Boston, MA), 2010.
- Lives of the Pirates: Swashbucklers, Scoundrels (Neighbors Beware!), illustrated by Kathryn Hewitt, Houghton Mifflin Harcourt (Boston, MA), 2010.
- The Brothers Kennedy: John, Robert, Edward, illustrated by Amy June Bates, Simon & Schuster (New York, NY), 2010.
- Big Wig: A Little History of Hair, illustrated by Peter Malone, Arthur A. Levine Books (New York, NY), 2011.
- Jim Henson: The Guy Who Played with Puppets, illustrated by Steve Johnson and Lou Fancher, Random House (New York, NY), 2011.
- The Beatles Were Fab (and They Were Funny) co-authored with Paul Brewer, illustrated by Stacy Innerst, Harcourt Children (Boston, MA), 2013

=== Giants of Science series ===
- Leonardo da Vinci, illustrated by Boris Kulikov, Viking (New York, NY), 2005.
- Isaac Newton, illustrated by Boris Kulikov, Viking (New York, NY), 2006.
- Sigmund Freud, illustrated by Boris Kulikov, Viking (New York, NY), 2006.
- Marie Curie, illustrated by Boris Kulikov, Viking (New York, NY), 2008.
- Albert Einstein, illustrated by Boris Kulikov, Viking (New York, NY), 2009.
- Charles Darwin, illustrated by Boris Kulikov, Penguin (New York, NY), 2010.
- Benjamin Franklin, illustrated by Boris Kulikov, Penguin (New York, NY), 2012.
