= Cats, Cats, Cats! =

Children's picture book by Lesléa Newman and Erika Oller

- Author: Lesléa Newman
- Illustrator: Erika Oller
- Language: English
- Genre: Children's picture book
- Published: 2001 (Simon & Schuster Books for Young Readers)
- Publication place: USA
- Media type: Print (hardback)
- Pages: 32 (unpaginated)
- ISBN: 9780689830778
- OCLC: 41361550

Cats, Cats, Cats! is a 2001 Children's picture book by Lesléa Newman and illustrated by Erika Oller. It is about Mrs Brown, a little old lady, and her 60 cats who snooze all day but then get up to all sorts of mischief at night.

== Reception ==
Reviews of Cats, Cats, Cats! include in Booklist that wrote "Oller's fun-loving watercolors portray all kinds of cats in all manner of positions as the rhyming text reveals the goings on in the zany household."

There have been other reviews by Kirkus Reviews, Publishers Weekly, School Library Journal, and Horn Book Guides.
