= Fat Chance (Newman novel) =

Book by Lesléa Newman

- Front cover of novel
- Author: Lesléa Newman
- Language: English
- Genre: Young adult novel
- Publisher: Putnam Press (1994); Scholastic (2004)
- Publication date: 1994
- Publication place: United States
- Media type: Print (paperback)
- Pages: 224

Fat Chance is a 1994 young adult novel written by Lesléa Newman. The book centers on a 13-year-old girl named Judi Liebowitz, who develops bulimia to try to lose weight. The novel was published by Putnam Press between 1994–2004 and by Scholastic starting in 2004.

== Synopsis ==
Judi Liebowitz wants to lose weight, be the thinnest girl in eighth grade, and have a boyfriend. She is convinced that if only she had "creamy thighs and amazing cheekbones that look like I'm always sipping through a straw", her best friend Monica would not have stolen the boy she had a crush on. When Judi meets slim, beautiful glamorous Nancy Pratt, she thinks her life will turn around and she will be gorgeous. Nancy teaches Judi the secret she uses to staying thin, binge-purge, thinking it will somehow help. Judi is thrilled she that can "have her cake and eat it, too and she won't gain weight." Nancy Pratt then ends up in intensive care because of her eating disorder. Judi does not want the same thing to happen to her but cannot control her disorder; and worst of all, she cannot or does not want to tell anyone, not even her own mother. There is no easy cure and for Nancy and Judi, it is a matter of life or death.

== Reception ==
Critical reviews for Fat Chance were positive. Publishers Weekly gave it a starred review, largely due to the reviewer's evaluating that "Judi's convincing voice and true-to-life experiences add up to a compelling, thought-provoking narrative...This book should be required reading for adolescent girls." The Los Angeles Times hailed the book, calling it, "A fabulous book which I recommend without reservation to people of any age who have asked themselves, 'Why did I eat that?'" Booklist said, "What Newman really gets right is the voice....the angst and the details are perfect."

== Awards ==
Fat Chance was awarded the Parents' Choice Silver Medal in 1994. It was also a finalist for the Iowa Teen Award in 1997.
