= Ann Turner (writer) =

American poet and children's author (born 1945)

- Born: Ann Warren; December 10, 1945 (age 80); Northampton, Massachusetts
- Education: University of Oxford (1966); Bates College (BA , 1967); University of Massachusetts (MAT, 1968)
- Spouse: Rick Turner
- Children: 2
- Writing career
- Period: 1970–present
- Notable work: The Girl Who Chased Away Sorrow

Ann Warren Turner is an American poet and children's author. She has published in a variety of genres, including nonfiction, historical fiction, contemporary novels, picture books, and poetry, with audiences ranging from young readers to young adult readers.

== Early life and education ==
Ann Warren was born December 10, 1945, in Northampton, Massachusetts to Richard and Marion Warren. Her father was a printer, and her mother was an artist. She had two brothers, one older and one younger. Although the family lived in a politically conservative area, her parents considered themselves socialists and intellectuals. Turner was sexually abused by a neighbor when she was a child, which she recounts in her 2001 memoir, Learning to Swim.

Turner received a study certificate from the University of Oxford in 1966, then earned a Bachelor of Arts from Bates College in 1967 and a Master in Teaching from the University of Massachusetts in 1968.

== Career ==
Turner began her career teaching high school English in Great Barrington, Massachusetts. She published her first book, Vultures, illustrated by her mother, Marion Gray Warren, in 1973, a year after her mother's death. As she continued writing, she also taught writing courses at Antioch University and the University of Massachusetts.

Turner's books include a variety of genres, including nonfiction, historical fiction, contemporary novels, picture books, and poetry, with audiences ranging from young readers to young adult readers. In a review of her historical fiction, Fraser and White highlighted three key components of her historical fiction: "she writes from a child's viewpoint"; "she writes from viewpoints not often explored, from the underside of the story"; and "the themes she explores include loss of childhood, power, and home". Her books also include "first person voice", "endings with poetic aspects that bring closure", "visual images", and "symbolism".

== Awards and honors ==
Turner first received a prize for her writing in 1967 when she won first place in The Atlantic Monthly's college creative writing contest.

Her books have also received praise. Her debut book, the New York Academy of Sciences named Vultures among their honourable mentions for their children's science book award. In 1991, Turner won first prize from the National Council for the Social Studies for Through Moon and Stars and Night Skies. In 2000, Red Flower Goes West won the WILLA Literary Award for Children's Fiction.

Two of Turner's books are Junior Library Guild selections: Secrets from the Dollhouse (2000) and Learning to Swim (2001). Turner's books have been included on lists of the year's best children's books, including Father of Lies (by Bank Street College of Education, 2012), and My Name Is Truth (by Bank Street College of Education, 2016). In 1998, the National Council of Teachers of English named Mississippi Mud among the year's Notable Children's Books in the Language Arts; selected books "deal[t] explicitly with language", "demonstrate[d] uniqueness in the use of language and style", and/or "invite[d] child response or participation". The Young Adult Library Services Association included A Lion's Hunger on their 1999 Quick Picks for Reluctant Young Adult Readers list and Learning to Swim on their 2001 Best Books for Young Adults list. The American Library Association has also included Learning to Swim (2002) and My Name is Truth (2016) on their annual Amelia Bloomer Book List.

== Personal life ==
Warren married Richard E. Turner on June 3, 1967. The couple have two children. As of 2014, she lived in Williamsburg, Massachusetts.

== Select publications ==
=== Nonfiction ===
- Vultures, illustrated by Marion Gray Warren, McKay (New York, NY), 1976.
- Houses for the Dead, McKay (New York, NY), 1976.
- Rituals of Birth: From Prehistory to the Present, McKay (New York, NY), 1978.

=== Novels ===
- A Hunter Comes Home, Crown (New York, NY), 1980.
- The Way Home, Crown (New York, NY), 1982.
- Third Girl from the Left, Macmillan (New York, NY), 1986.
- Grasshopper Summer, Macmillan (New York, NY), 1989.
- Rosemary's Witch, Harper (New York, NY), 1991.
- Dust for Dinner, illustrated by Robert Barrett, HarperCollins (New York, NY), 1995.
- One Brave Summer, HarperCollins (New York, NY), 1995.
- Elfsong, Harcourt (New York, NY), 1995.
- Finding Walter, Harcourt (New York, NY), 1997.
- The Girl Who Chased Away Sorrow: The Diary of Sara Nita, a Navajo Girl, Scholastic (New York, NY), 1999.
- Love Thy Neighbor: The Tory Diary of Prudence Emerson, Scholastic (New York, NY), 2003.
- When Mr. Jefferson Came to Philadelphia: What I Learned of Freedom, 1776, HarperCollins (New York, NY), 2003.
- Maïa of Thebes: 1463 B.C., Scholastic (New York, NY), 2005.
- Hard Hit, Scholastic (New York, NY), 2006.
- Father of Lies, HarperTeen (New York, NY), 2011.

=== Picture books ===
- Time of the Bison, illustrated by Beth Peck, Macmillan (New York, NY), 1987.
- Hedgehog for Breakfast, illustrated by Lisa McCue, Macmillan (New York, NY), 1989.
- Heron Street, illustrated by Lisa Desimini, Harper (New York, NY), 1989.
- Through Moon and Stars and Night Skies, illustrated by James Graham Hale, Harper (New York, NY), 1990.
- Stars for Sarah, illustrated by Mary Teichman, Harper (New York, NY), 1991.
- Katie's Trunk, illustrated by Ron Himler, Macmillan (New York, NY), 1992.
- Rainflowers, illustrated by Robert J. Blake, HarperCollins (New York, NY), 1992.
- Apple Valley Year, illustrated by Sandi Wickersham Resnick, Macmillan (New York, NY), 1993.
- Swing Quilts, illustrated by Thomas B. Allen, Macmillan (New York, NY), 1994.
- A Moon for Seasons, illustrated by Robert Noreika, Macmillan (New York, NY), 1994.
- Drummer Boy: Marching to the Civil War, illustrated by Mark Hess, HarperCollins (New York, NY), 1998.
- Angel Hide and Seek, illustrated by Lois Ehlert, HarperCollins (New York, NY), 1998.
- Let's Be Animals, illustrated by Rick Brown, HarperFestival (New York, NY), 1998.
- Secrets from the Dollhouse, illustrated by Raúl Colon, HarperCollins (New York, NY), 1999.
- Shaker Hearts, illustrated by Wendell Minor, HarperCollins (New York, NY), 1997.
- Red Flower Goes West, illustrated by Dennis Nolan, Hyperion (New York, NY), 1999.
- In the Heart, illustrated by Salley Mavor, HarperCollins (New York, NY), 2001.
- Abe Lincoln Remembers, illustrated by Wendell Minor, HarperCollins (New York, NY), 2001.
- Sitting Bull Remembers, illustrated by Wendell Minor, HarperCollins (New York, NY), 2007.
- Pumpkin Cat, illustrated by Amy June Bates, Hyperion (New York, NY), 2004.
- My Name Is Truth: The Life of Sojourner Truth, illustrated by James Ransome, HarperCollins (New York, NY), 2015.

=== Poetry ===
- Dakota Dugout, illustrated by Ronald Himler, Macmillan (New York, NY), 1985.
- Tickle a Pickle, illustrated by Karen Ann Weinhaus, Macmillan (New York, NY), 1986.
- Street Talk, illustrated by Catherine Stock, Houghton, Mifflin (Boston, MA), 1986.
- Nettie's Trip South, illustrated by Ronald Himler, Macmillan (New York, NY), 1987.
- Grass Songs: Poems, illustrated by Barry Moser, Harcourt (New York, NY), 1993.
- The Christmas House, illustrated by Nancy Edwards Calder, HarperCollins (New York, NY), 1994.
- Mississippi Mud: Three Prairie Journals, illustrated by Robert J. Blake, HarperCollins (New York, NY), 1997.
- A Lion's Hunger: Poems of First Love, Marshall Cavendish (New York, NY), 1999.
- Learning to Swim: A Memoir, Scholastic (New York, NY), 2000.
