= Ketzel, the Cat who Composed =

2015 picture book by Lesléa Newman

- Author: Lesléa Newman
- Illustrator: Amy June Bates
- Language: English
- Genre: Children's picture book
- Published: 2015 (Candlewick Press)
- Publication place: USA
- Media type: Print (hardback)
- Pages: 40 (unpaginated)
- ISBN: 9780763665555
- OCLC: 949336837

Ketzel, the Cat who Composed is a children's picture book by Lesléa Newman. Based on a true story, it is about the friendship between Moshe Cotel and a kitten, Ketzel, who composes a musical piece that Cotel enters into a music competition and receives a special mention.

== Reception ==
Booklist gave Ketzel a star review, wrote "this delightfully told story is unlikely and adorable in equal parts. Bates' watercolor, gouache, and pencil illustrations feature an unanthropomorphic kitty whose inquisitive and quizzical nature will be familiar to all cat owners." and found it "An absolute charmer!" and the School Library Journal called it "A delightful read." Kirkus Reviews named it "Truly, the cat's meow." and Publishers Weekly, in a star review, wrote "a lovely tale of cross-species affection and creativity".

It was also reviewed by the Jewish Book Council, the Jewish Journal, and the Buffalo News.

Ketzel won the 2016 Massachusetts Book Awards Picture Book/Early Reader Award, and the 2016 Gold Sydney Taylor Book Award Younger Reader Category
