= Asha's Mums =

1990 children's book by Rosamund Elwin and Michele Paulse

- First edition
- Author: Rosamund Elwin & Michele Paulse
- Illustrator: Dawn Lee
- Language: English
- Genre: Children's Literature
- Publisher: Women's Press
- Publication date: 1990
- Publication place: Canada
- Media type: Print Paperback
- Pages: 23

Asha's Mums is a children's book written in 1990 by Michele Paulse and Rosamund Elwin and illustrated by Dawn Lee focusing on the topic of same-sex parents. Due to the subject matter, the book has been extremely controversial with a mixed critical reception, leading to a legal case in British Columbia over an attempt to ban the book.

== Plot summary ==
This story is based on the protagonist, Asha, and her struggle explaining to her teacher and friends that she has two mothers, as part of the process of gaining permission to go on a school trip. The book begins when Asha's teacher, Ms. Samuels, sees Asha's mothers' names on the permission form and assumes it has been filled out incorrectly. Ms. Samuels wonders which one is Asha's mother, and she struggles to understand the possibility of Asha having two moms. In one scene, a worried Asha confides in her mothers who agree to talk to the teacher face to face to sort matters out. In the meantime, Asha informs her classmates about different types of families. The story concludes with Asha being granted permission to go on the school trip, and her classmates and teachers having learned about different family structures.

== Reception ==
Asha's Mums has been received by the public in a variety of ways, as some see it as being poorly written while others appreciate the content. In a piece written by Elizabeth MacCallum, she explains that "Elwin and Paulse teach sexual politics and don't even know how to concoct a believable plot." Lian Beveridge introduces the term "moral panic" to describe the response of the people who dislike the book and disagree with the publishing of LGBTQ+ content. "Moral panic" is an anxious feeling that comes about when people see someone or something as a risk to an already established norm. To him, this term acts as a reasoning for those who disagree with the publishing of LGBTQ+ children's books. However, in a different article, Tracy Scott states, "That Asha is black and working-class is a reminder that gay people and families cross all economic and racial lines. We deserve to be in the school curriculum, and our children - all of them - deserve education, not prejudice and ignorance."

=== Controversy ===
A notable controversy occurred in 1997, a legal case referred to as Chamberlain vs. Surrey School District. It all began when a school teacher by the name of James Chamberlain, who identifies as gay and who taught in the Surrey School District, attempted to have three books approved by the school board. The list consisted of Asha's Mums; One Dad, Two Dads, Brown Dad, Blue Dads by Johnny Valentine; and Belinda's Bouquet by Lesléa Newman. These children's books all included the topic of same-sex parents, depicting them in a positive way. The school board decided on April 24, 1997, with a vote of 4-2, that the books would not be approved. More specifically, Asha's Mums was denied by the board by a vote of 5-2.

The school board explained that the books were rejected for curriculum use due to religious reasons, avoiding any conflict with families. The decision made by the board was backed by a Protestant and Catholic group that held very conservative beliefs. The more progressive organizations did not support the ruling.

In December 1998, the case was taken to the British Columbia Supreme Court where the book ban was overturned as Chamberlain argued that the school board used religion in an ill-suited fashion and that it disregarded the B.C. School Act. This decision was urged by Justice Saunders.

The British Columbia Court of Appeal ruling in September 2000 overturned Saunders' ruling that the ban had been religiously motivated, but substituted its own narrower finding that the books could not be banned from use because they met the school board's criteria for inclusion in school libraries, thus leaving both sides of the case technically able to claim victory. On the day following the decision, the Vancouver Sun republished the entire text of the book in its print edition.

Because of the ambiguity of the decision, the case was taken up by the Supreme Court of Canada. In Chamberlain v Surrey School District No 36 [2002], the Supreme Court of Canada found that the ban was unreasonable, contradicting the secular and non-sectarian principles of the BC School Act. Under this ruling, a ban on books about same-sex parents could not be legally justified.

Within months of the Supreme Court decision, the Surrey school board again banned the three books, this time citing reasons including "poor grammar and spelling" in Asha's Mums, the inclusion of the "age-inappropriate" subject of dieting in Belinda's Bouquet and purported mockery of "different skin colours" in One Dad, Two Dads. At the same time, however, the board approved two other books, ABC: A Family Alphabet Book and Who's In a Family, which also included depictions of same-sex parents.

==== Analysis of controversy ====
In her analysis of controversies over LGBTQ+ literature like Asha's Mums, Jennifer Espositio explains the prevalence of such debates during the 1990s. The idea of the "Rainbow Curriculum" was suggested in 1992 by Joseph Fernandez, which included a list of books highlighting gay and lesbian topics. This action caused an uproar from religious groups and individuals, causing the curriculum to be shot down. Additionally, conservative parents began revolting and protesting by burning books that included LGBTQ+ themes. In the Chamberlain vs. Surrey School District case, one of the more pressing issues that involved the public was whether or not religious beliefs should play a role in situations such as this. Typically a more private matter, religion played a large role in many of the court rulings. It brought to light the opposing perspectives of more progressive groups, arguing that religion should be kept separate from public matters, and the conservative groups stating that that view is inherently anti- religious.
