= Chamberlain v Surrey School District No 36 =

- Supreme Court of Canada

Hearing: June 12, 2002 Judgment: December 20, 2002
- Citations: [2002] 4 S.C.R. 710, 2002 SCC 86
- Docket No.: 28654

Court membership
- Chief Justice: Beverley McLachlin; Puisne Justices: Claire L'Heureux-Dubé, Charles Gonthier, Frank Iacobucci, John C. Major, Michel Bastarache, Ian Binnie, Louise Arbour, Louis LeBel

Reasons given
- Majority: McLachlin C.J., joined by L'Heureux‑Dubé, Iacobucci, Major, Binnie and Arbour JJ.
- Concurrence: LeBel J.
- Dissent: Gonthier J., joined by Bastarache J.

Chamberlain v Surrey School District No 36, [2002] 4 S.C.R. 710, 2002 SCC 86, was a case in which the Supreme Court of Canada held that a local school board could not impose its religious values by refusing to permit the use of books that sought to promote tolerance of same-sex relationships.

== Background ==
In 1997, James Chamberlain, a primary school teacher in Surrey, British Columbia, sought permission from School District 36 Surrey to use three books in his Kindergarten and Grade one classes. The books, Asha's Mums, Belinda's Bouquet and One Dad, Two Dads, Brown Dad, Blue Dads, each presented families where both parents were of the same sex. Chamberlain asserted that the books were necessary to reflect the realities of today's families and to teach his pupils about diversity and tolerance. A 4–2 majority of the board voted to deny the request.

== Opinion of the Court ==
A legal battle to overturn the decision to ban the three books went all the way to the Supreme Court of Canada, where the school board's decision at the British Columbia Court of Appeal was overturned in favour of the original lower court judgment. The judgment cited the need for families headed by same-sex couples to be respected. Chief Justice Beverley McLachlin dismissed the board's concerns that children would be confused or misled by classroom information about same-sex parents. She pointed out that the children of same-sex parents are rubbing shoulders with children from more traditional families and wrote: "Tolerance is always age-appropriate, children cannot learn unless they are exposed to views that differ from those they are taught at home." The legal fees ended up costing Surrey taxpayers over $1,200,000.

== See also ==
- List of Supreme Court of Canada cases (McLachlin Court)
