= One Dad, Two Dads, Brown Dad, Blue Dads =

1994 children's book

- Author: Johnny Valentine and Melody Sarecky
- Language: English
- Genre: LGBTQ Literature
- Published: July 1994
- Publication place: United States of America
- Pages: 30

One Dad, Two Dads, Brown Dad, Blue Dads is a children's book written by Johnny Valentine and Melody Sarecky. The intended audience is elementary school children, and it discusses all kinds of different fathers, including having two dads.

Its title is a play on the title of an older Dr. Seuss children's book, One Fish Two Fish Red Fish Blue Fish.

The storybook is intended to inform young children that it is okay to have different types of parents, and refutes the "one size fits all model." With both positive and negative reviews, One Dad, Two Dads, Brown Dad, Blue Dads created a conflict of opinions. In fact, there was a large controversy in Canada surrounding the banning of the children's book. The picture book was one of the three books at the center of the 1997 Surrey book-banning controversy, alongside Lesléa Newman's Belinda's Bouquet and Rosamund Elwin and Michele Paulse's Asha's Mums.

== Background ==
One Dad, Two Dads, Brown Dad, Blue Dads was written in July 1994. Sasha Alyson is the author of this book, but he goes by the pen name of Johnny Valentine. The storybook was published during the middle of Alyson's writing career. Alyson wrote books before and after the publication of One Dad, Two Dads, Brown Dad, Blue Dads.

== Summary ==
The story begins with the protagonist, an unnamed elementary school girl, exclaiming, "I don't know who has dads that are blue!" From there, another character named "Lou" is introduced. Lou has two "blue" dads, and proceeds to describe how "blue" they are. The plot then goes back and forth between the protagonist and Lou, with the protagonist asking all sorts of questions about Lou's dads. After all of the questions are asked by the protagonist, Lou explains his dads are "blue", and "they're just like all other dads---- black, white, or green." It is at this point that the protagonist realizes that even though Lou's dads are "blue", they can still do all of the things that a typical dad would do. At the end of the book, another character is brought in, named Jean. Jean invites the protagonist and Lou to come see her dad, who is green.

== Genre ==
One Dad, Two Dads, Brown Dad, Blue Dads is a children's book of fiction aimed at elementary school children. The storybook combines illustrations with short text, "S. Alyson has written several children's books under the pen name Johnny Valentine, of which this book is one." Alyson's children's book has been discussed when talking about LGBTQ content.

== Analysis ==
Many educators and scholars aim to use this book and books like it for the purpose of informing young children about "homophobia, sexuality, and gender roles". One Dad, Two Dads, Brown Dad, Blue Dads has been subjected to scholarly interpretation. For example, Nathalie op de Beeck, an assistant professor from Illinois State University, claims that gay and lesbian picture books are becoming more inclusive through the scope of their titles. Interpretations like Beeck's have brought LGBTQ literature into the spotlight more than ever before. One Dad, Two Dads, Brown Dad, Blue Dads was also part of Maria Martinez Lirola's study on representations of masculinity in picture books featuring two-men families. Lirola noted how both blue dads were featured in equal capacity, with neither given more importance over the other.

== Reception ==
=== Book reviews ===
According to Book Links, One Dad, Two Dads, Brown Dad, Blue Dads is a warming story that uses rhymes and goofiness to expose prejudice. On the contrary, Louise L. Sherman of the Anna C. Scott School, claims that young children would take the book at "face value", seeing only the silly aspect of the book, whereas older kids would be better off with a more clear-cut explanation of the material. This review points out the potential issues that One Dad, Two Dads, Brown Dad, Blue Dads presents to differently aged children. Anne Kingston of The National Post points out the book’s “didactic messages and uninspired illustrations,” concluding that the book will not be harmful due to the fact that “five-year-olds don’t filter information through a sexually aware consciousness”.

=== Controversy ===
The picture book was met with challenges primarily for its inclusion of homosexual parents. One such example was when One Dad, Two Dads, Brown Dad, Blue Dads, Asha's Mums, and Belinda's Bouquet were brought into question in the Canadian school system. The book was initially banned by the Surrey School Board based on the contents of its dedication, which reads: "To Jacob, who has only one mom and one dad, But don't feel sorry for him - they are both pretty great parents." James Chamberlain, a gay teacher within the Surrey School District, fought to have these three books approved by the school district. Chamberlain and four fellow litigants spent $400,000 of their own money to challenge the banning of the book. When brought forward to the Supreme Court of Canada, the following was stated: "No age is too tender for children to learn the value of tolerance." The resulting challenge has allowed free access to the book, as the morals teach tolerance, regardless of how different one is from another.
