= Navajo =

Athabaskan ethnic group of the United States

Navajo Diné (lit. 'the people')
Diné
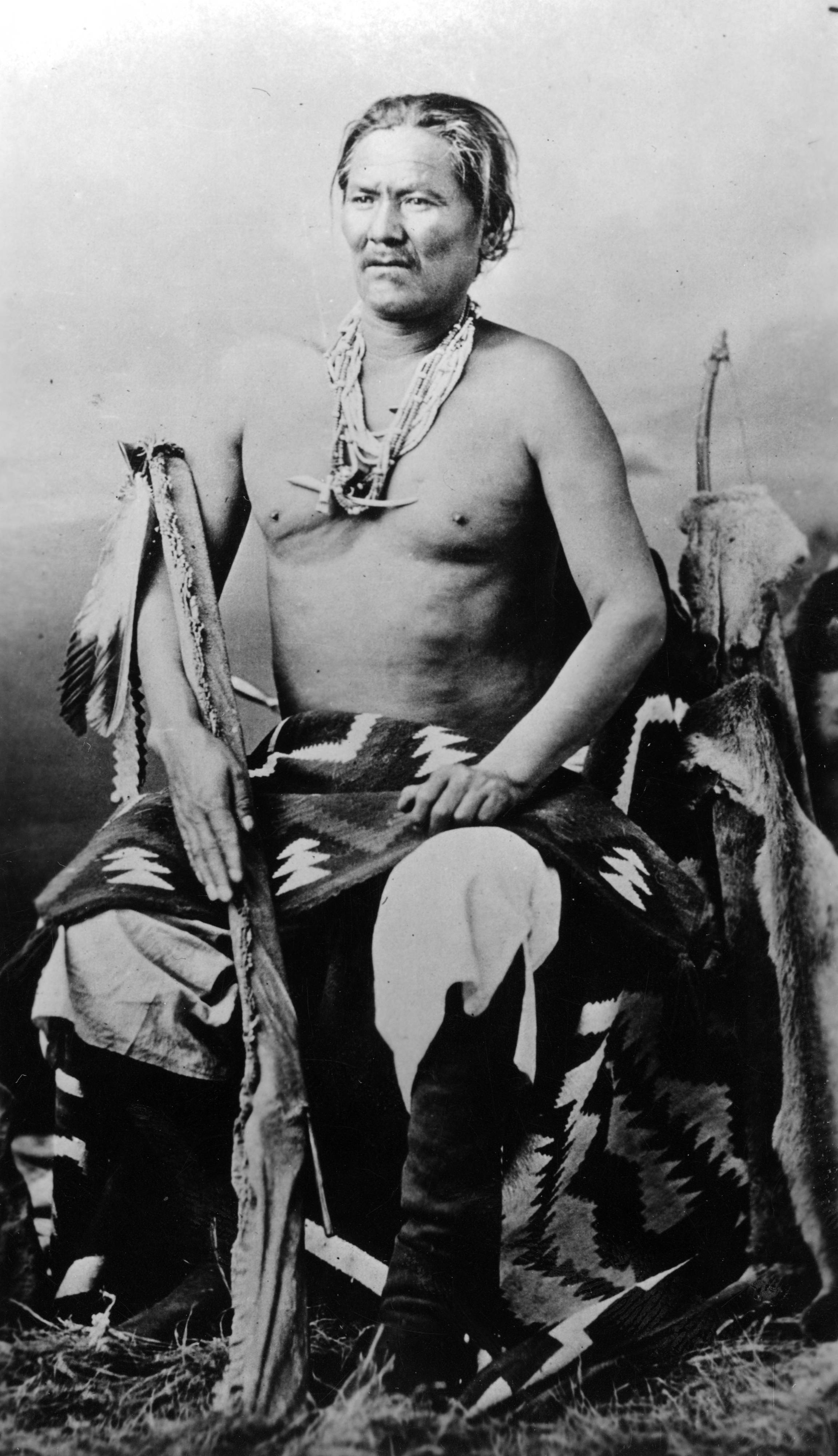
- Manuelito (Navajo, 1818–1893), a chief during the Long Walk

Total population
- 427,414 enrolled tribal citizens (2026)

Regions with significant populations
- United States (Navajo Nation, Arizona, Colorado, New Mexico, Utah, California); Canada; 700 residents of Canada identified as having Navajo ancestry in the 2016 Canadian Census

Languages
- Navajo, Plains Indian Sign Language (Navajo Sign Language), English, Spanish

Religion
- Indigenous Religion, Native American Church, Christianity

Related ethnic groups
- Other Athabaskan peoples, especially Apaches

- People: Diné
- Language: Diné Bizaad, Diné Yideez, Hak'éí Yideez
- Country: Dinétah

The Navajo are an Indigenous People of the Southwestern United States. The Navajo term for themselves is Diné(h). Their language is Navajo (Navajo: Diné bizaad), a Southern Athabaskan language. The states with the largest Diné populations are Arizona (140,263) and New Mexico (108,305). More than three-quarters of the Diné population resides in these two states.

The overwhelming majority of Diné are enrolled in the Navajo Nation. Some Diné are enrolled in the Colorado River Indian Tribes, another federally recognized tribe. Historic achievements of the Navajo and related tribes include the Pueblo architecture as well as the taming of the horse after European colonization. The Navajo have a rich artistic tradition in beadwork and colorful styles in painting and dress.

With more than 427,414 enrolled tribal citizens as of 2026, the Navajo Nation is the second largest federally recognized tribe in the United States. The Navajo Nation has the largest reservation in the country. The reservation straddles the Four Corners region and covers more than 27,325 square miles (70,770 square kilometers) of land in Arizona, Utah, and New Mexico. The Navajo Reservation is slightly larger than the state of West Virginia.

== History ==
=== Early history ===
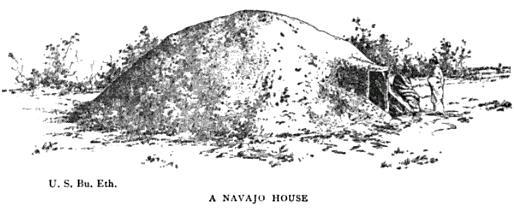
A 19th-century hogan

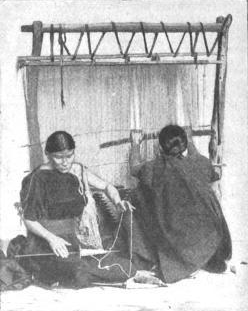
Navajo spinning and weaving on vertical loom

The Navajo are speakers of a Na-Dené Southern Athabaskan language which they call Diné bizaad (lit. 'People's language'). The term Navajo comes from Spanish missionaries and historians who referred to the Pueblo Indians through this term, although they referred to themselves as the Diné, meaning '(the) people'.

The language comprises two geographic, mutually intelligible dialects. It is closely related to the languages of the Apache. The Navajo and Apache are believed to have migrated from northwestern Canada and eastern Alaska, where the majority of Athabaskan speakers reside. Additionally, some Navajo know Navajo Sign Language, which is either a dialect or daughter of Plains Sign Talk. Some also know Plains Sign Talk itself.

A southward migration of Athabaskan peoples from subarctic North America has been dated to around 1,000 years ago. It has been suggested that the Navajo and Apaches may have migrated due to the effects of a volcanic explosion in the Saint Elias Mountains of Alaska around 803 AD. Part of the migration was along the Rocky Mountains before arriving in the present-day southwest United States.

Initially, the Navajo were largely hunters and gatherers. Later, they adopted farming from existing Pueblo people, growing mainly the traditional Native American "Three Sisters" of corn, beans, and squash. They adopted herding sheep and goats from the Spaniards as a main source of trade and food. Meat became essential in the Navajo diet. Sheep became a form of currency and familial status. Women began to spin and weave wool into blankets and clothing; they created items of highly valued artistic expression, which were also traded and sold.

Oral history indicates a long relationship with Pueblo people and a willingness to incorporate Puebloan ideas and linguistic variance. There were long-established trading practices between the groups. Mid-16th century Spanish records recount that the Pueblo exchanged maize and woven cotton goods for bison meat, hides, and stone from Athabaskans traveling to the pueblos or living nearby. In the 18th century, the Spanish reported that the Navajo maintained large herds of livestock and cultivated large crop areas.

=== Spanish contact ===
Western historians believe that the Spanish before 1600 referred to the Navajo as Apaches or Quechos. Fray Geronimo de Zarate-Salmeron, who was in Jemez in 1622, used Apachu de Nabajo in the 1620s to refer to the people in the Chama Valley region, east of the San Juan River and northwest of present-day Santa Fe, New Mexico. Navahu comes from the Tewa language, meaning 'a large area of cultivated lands'. By the 1640s, the Spanish began using the term Navajo to refer to the Diné.

During the 1670s, the Spanish wrote that the Diné lived in a region known as Dinétah, about 60 miles (97 km) west of the Rio Chama Valley region. In the 1770s, the Spanish sent military expeditions against the Navajo in the Mount Taylor and Chuska Mountain regions of New Mexico. The Spanish, Navajo and Hopi continued to trade with each other and formed a loose alliance to fight Apache and Comanche bands for the next 20 years. During this time there were relatively minor raids by Navajo bands and Spanish citizens against each other.

In 1800, Governor Chacon led 500 men to the Tunicha Mountains against the Navajo. Twenty Navajo chiefs asked for peace. In 1804 and 1805, the Navajo and Spaniards mounted major expeditions against each other's settlements. In May 1805, another peace was established. Similar patterns of peace-making, raiding, and trading among the Navajo, Spaniards, Apache, Comanche, and Hopi continued until the arrival of Americans in 1846.

=== Territory of New Mexico 1846–1863 ===
The Navajos encountered the United States Army in 1846 when General Stephen W. Kearny invaded Santa Fe with 1,600 men during the Mexican–American War. On November 21, 1846, following an invitation from a small party of American soldiers under the command of Captain John Reid, who journeyed deep into Navajo country and contacted him, Narbona and other Navajos negotiated a treaty of peace with Colonel Alexander Doniphan at Bear Springs, Ojo del Oso (later the site of Fort Wingate). This agreement was not honored by some Navajo, nor by some New Mexicans. The Navajos raided New Mexican livestock, and New Mexicans took women, children, and livestock from the Navajo.

In 1849, the military governor of New Mexico, Colonel John MacRae Washington—accompanied by John S. Calhoun, an Indian agent—led 400 soldiers into the Navajo country, penetrating Canyon de Chelly. He signed a treaty with two Navajo leaders: Mariano Martinez as Head Chief and Chapitone as Second Chief. The treaty acknowledged the transfer of jurisdiction from the United Mexican States to the United States. The treaty allowed forts and trading posts to be built on Navajo land. In exchange, the United States, promised "such donations [and] such other liberal and humane measures, as [it] may deem meet and proper." While en route to sign this treaty, the prominent Navajo peace leader Narbona was killed, causing hostility between the treaty parties.

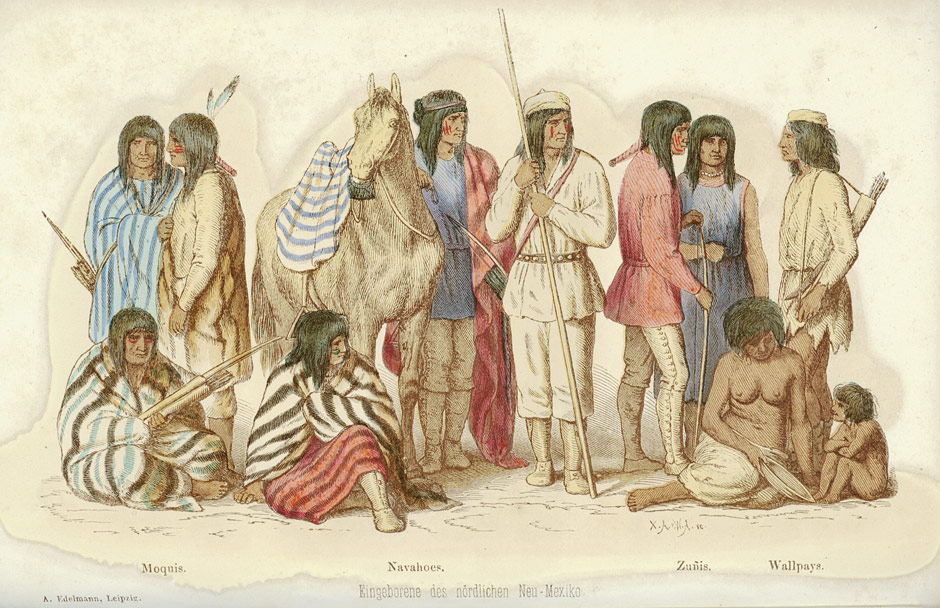
"The Indigenous People of Northern New Mexico," by Balduin Möllhausen, 1861

During the next 10 years, the U.S. established forts on traditional Navajo territory. Military records cite this development as a precautionary measure to protect citizens and the Navajos from each other. However, the Spanish/Mexican-Navajo pattern of raids and expeditions continued. Over 400 New Mexican militia conducted a campaign against the Navajo, against the wishes of the Territorial Governor, in 1860–61. They killed Navajo warriors, captured women and children for slaves, and destroyed crops and dwellings. The Navajos call this period Naahondzood, 'the fearing time'.

In 1861, Brigadier-General James H. Carleton, Commander of the Federal District of New Mexico, initiated a series of military actions against the Navajos and Apaches. Colonel Kit Carson was at the new Fort Wingate with Army troops and volunteer New Mexico militia. Carleton ordered Carson to kill Mescalero Apache men and destroy any Mescalero property he could find. Carleton believed these harsh tactics would bring any Indian tribe under control. The Mescalero surrendered and were sent to the new reservation called Bosque Redondo.

In 1863, Carleton ordered Carson to use the same tactics on the Navajo. Carson and his force swept through Navajo land, killing Navajos and destroying crops and dwellings, fouling wells, and capturing livestock. Facing starvation and death, Navajo groups came to Fort Defiance for relief. On July 20, 1863, the first of many groups departed to join the Mescalero at Bosque Redondo. Other groups continued to come in through 1864.

However, not all the Navajos came in or were found. Some lived near the San Juan River, some beyond the Hopi villages, and others lived with Apache bands.

=== Long Walk ===
Beginning in the spring of 1864, the Army forced around 9,000 Navajo men, women, and children to walk over 300 miles (480 km) to Fort Sumner, New Mexico, for internment at Bosque Redondo. The internment was disastrous for the Navajo, as the government failed to provide enough water, wood, provisions, and livestock for the 4,000 to 5,000 people. Large-scale crop failure and disease were also endemic during this time, as were raids by other tribes and white civilians. Some Navajos froze in the winter because they could make only poor shelters from the few materials they were given. This period is known among the Navajos as "the Fearing Time". In addition, a small group of Mescalero Apache, longtime enemies of the Navajos, had been relocated to the area, which resulted in conflicts.

In 1868, the Treaty of Bosque Redondo was negotiated between Navajo leaders and the federal government, allowing the surviving Navajos to return to a reservation on a portion of their former homeland.

=== Reservation era ===
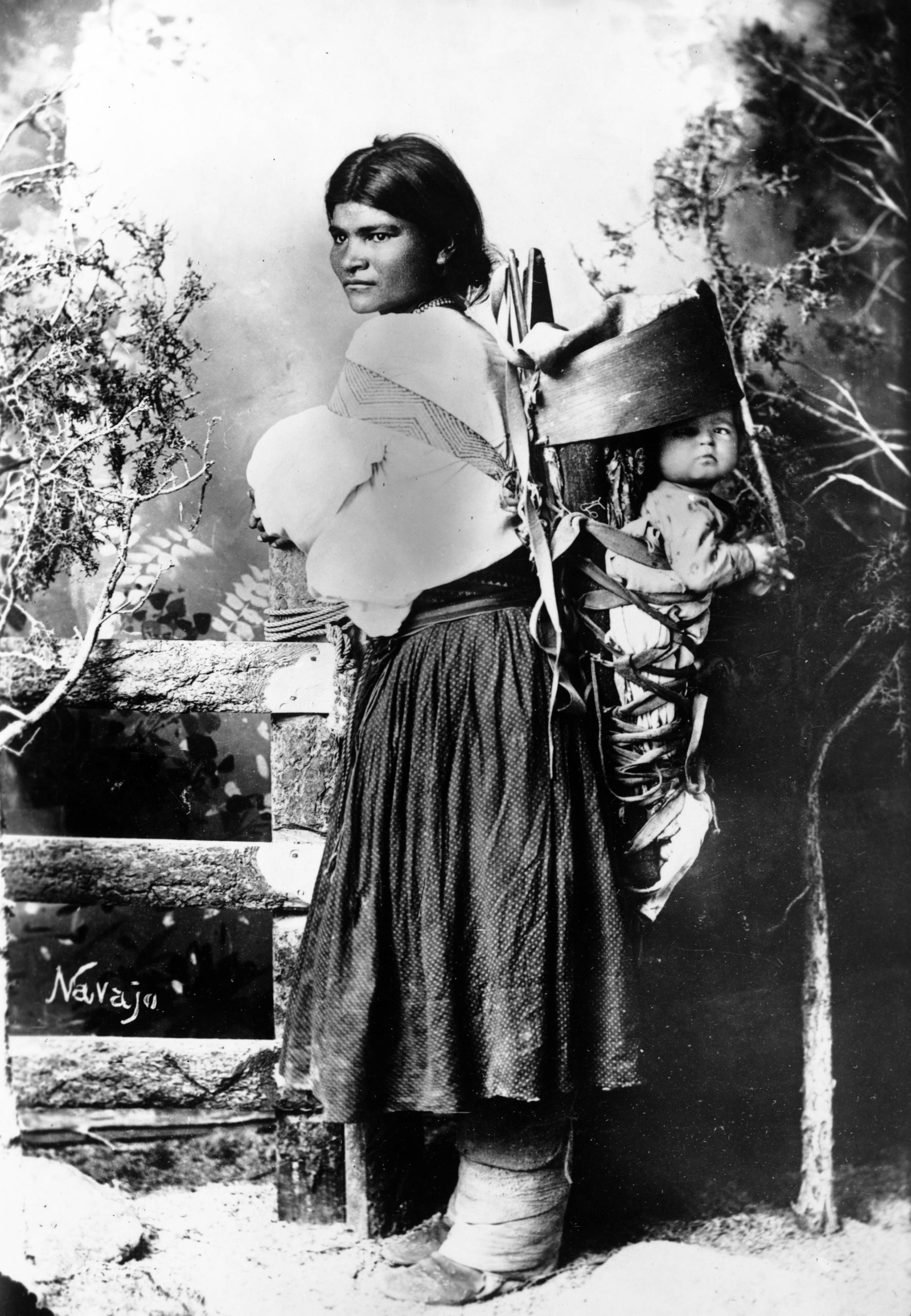
Navajo woman and child, circa 1880–1910

Flag of the Navajo Nation

The United States military continued to maintain forts on the Navajo reservation in the years after the Long Walk. From 1873 to 1895, the military employed Navajos as "Indian Scouts" at Fort Wingate to help their regular units. During this period, Chief Manuelito founded the Navajo Tribal Police. It operated from 1872 to 1875 as an anti-raid task force working to maintain the peaceful terms of the 1868 Navajo treaty.

By treaty, the Navajos were allowed to leave the reservation for trade, with permission from the military or local Indian agent. Eventually, the arrangement led to a gradual end in Navajo raids, as the tribe was able to increase their livestock and crops. Also, the tribe gained an increase in the size of the Navajo reservation from 3.5 million acres (14,000 km^{2}; 5,500 sq mi) to 16 million acres (65,000 km^{2}; 25,000 sq mi) as it stands today. But economic conflicts with non-Navajos continued for many years as civilians and companies exploited resources assigned to the Navajo. The US government made leases for livestock grazing, took land for railroad development, and permitted mining on Navajo land without consulting the tribe.

In 1883, Lt. Parker, accompanied by 10 enlisted men and two scouts, went up the San Juan River to separate the Navajos and citizens who had encroached on Navajo land. In the same year, Lt. Lockett, with the aid of 42 enlisted soldiers, was joined by Lt. Holomon at Navajo Springs. Evidently, citizens of the surnames Houck and/or Owens had murdered a Navajo chief's son, and 100 armed Navajo warriors were looking for them.

In 1887, citizens Palmer, Lockhart, and King fabricated a charge of horse stealing and randomly attacked a dwelling on the reservation. Two Navajo men and all three whites died as a result, but a woman and a child survived. Capt. Kerr (with two Navajo scouts) examined the ground and then met with several hundred Navajos at Houcks Tank. Rancher Bennett, whose horse was allegedly stolen, told Kerr that his horses were stolen by the three whites to catch a horse thief. In the same year, Lt. Scott went to the San Juan River with two scouts and 21 enlisted men. The Navajos believed Scott was there to drive off the whites who had settled on the reservation and had fenced off the river from the Navajo. Scott found evidence of many non-Navajo ranches. Only three were active, and the owners wanted payment for their improvements before leaving. Scott ejected them.

In 1913, an Indian agent ordered a Navajo and his three wives to come in and then arrested them for having a plural marriage. A small group of Navajos used force to free the women and retreated to Beautiful Mountain with 30 or 40 sympathizers. They refused to surrender to the agent, and local law enforcement and military refused the agent's request for an armed engagement. General Scott arrived, and with the help of Henry Chee Dodge, a leader among the Navajo, defused the situation.

=== Boarding schools and education ===
During the time on the reservation, the Navajo tribe was forced to assimilate into white society. Navajo children were sent to boarding schools within the reservation and off the reservation. The first Bureau of Indian Affairs (BIA) school opened at Fort Defiance in 1870 and led the way for eight others to be established. Many older Navajos were against this education and would hide their children to keep them from being taken.

Once the children arrived at the boarding school, their lives changed dramatically. European Americans taught the classes under an English-only curriculum and punished any student caught speaking Navajo. The children were under militaristic discipline, run by the Siláo. In multiple interviews, subjects recalled being captured and disciplined by the Siláo if they tried to run away. Other conditions included inadequate food, overcrowding, required manual labor in kitchens, fields, and boiler rooms, and military-style uniforms and haircuts.

Change did not occur in these boarding schools until after the Meriam Report was published in 1929 by the Secretary of Interior, Hubert Work. This report discussed Indian boarding schools as being inadequate in terms of diet, medical services, dormitory overcrowding, undereducated teachers, restrictive discipline, and manual labor by the students to keep the school running.

This report was the precursor to education reforms initiated under President Franklin D. Roosevelt, under which two new schools were built on the Navajo reservation. However, Rough Rock Day School was run in the same militaristic style as Fort Defiance and did not implement educational reforms. Navajo accounts of the Evangelical Missionary School portray it as having a family-like atmosphere with home-cooked meals, new or gently used clothing, humane treatment, and a Navajo-based curriculum. Educators found the Evangelical Missionary School curriculum to be much more beneficial for Navajo children.

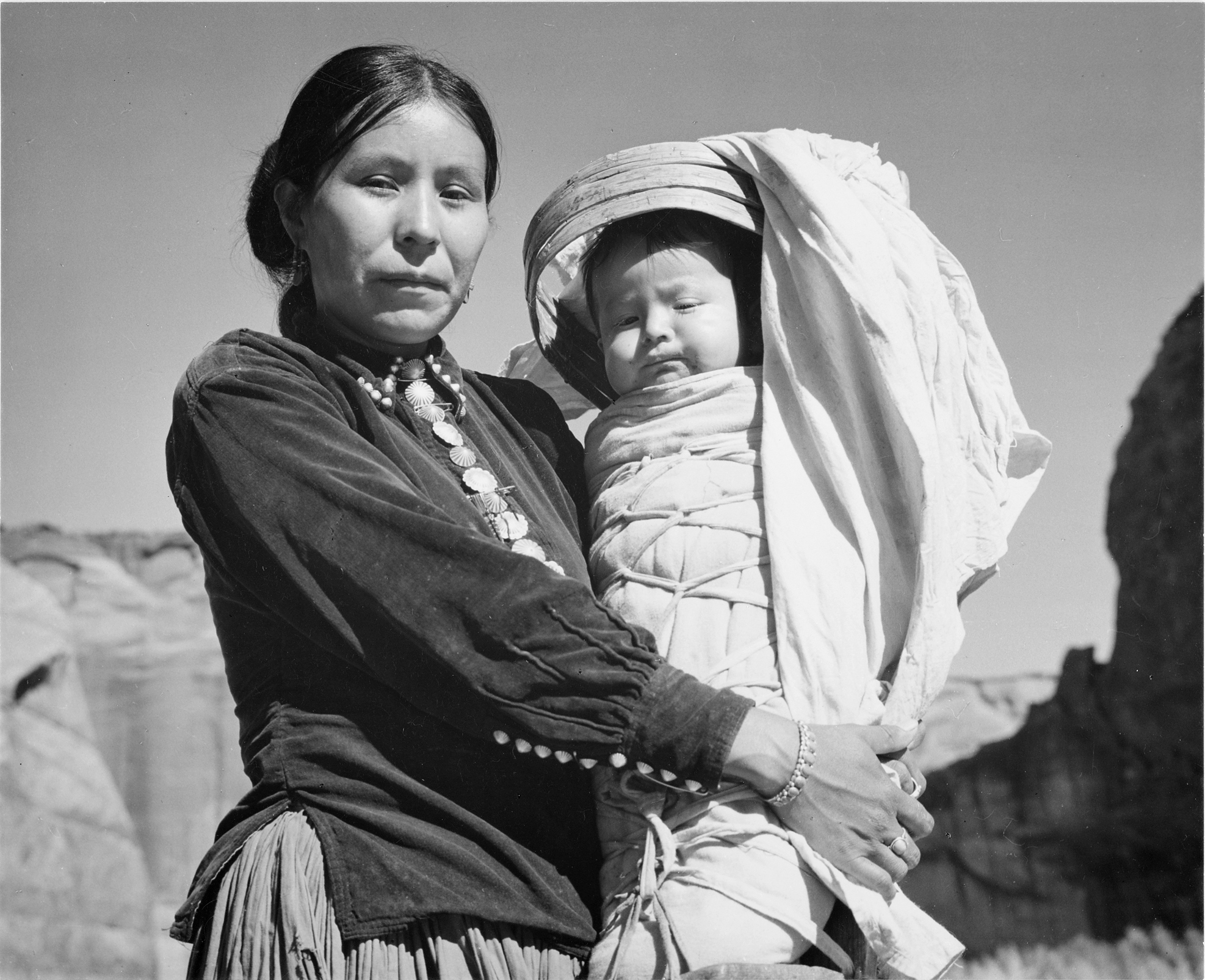
Untitled. Ansel Adams. 1941. Taken near Canyon de Chelly

In 1937, Boston heiress Mary Cabot Wheelright and Navajo singer and medicine man Hastiin Klah founded the Wheelwright Museum of the American Indian in Santa Fe. It is a repository for sound recordings, manuscripts, paintings, and sandpainting tapestries of the Navajos. It also featured exhibits to express the beauty, dignity, and logic of the Navajo religion. When Klah met Cabot in 1921, he witnessed decades of efforts by the US government and missionaries to assimilate the Navajos into mainstream society. The museum was founded to preserve the religion and traditions of the Navajo, which Klah was sure would otherwise soon be lost forever.

The result of these boarding schools led to much language loss within the Navajo Nation. After the Second World War, the Meriam Report funded more children to attend these schools with six times as many children attending boarding schools than before the war. English being the primary language spoken at these schools as well as the local towns surrounding the Navajo reservations contributed to residents becoming bilingual; however, Navajo was still the primary language spoken at home.

=== Livestock Reduction 1930s–1950s ===
The Navajo Livestock Reduction was imposed upon the Navajo Nation by the federal government starting in 1933, during the Great Depression. Under various forms, it continued into the 1950s. Worried about large herds in the arid climate, at a time when the Dust Bowl was endangering the Great Plains, the government decided that the land of the Navajo Nation could support only a fixed number of sheep, goats, cattle, and horses. The Federal government believed that land erosion was worsening in the area and the only solution was to reduce the number of livestock.

In 1933, John Collier was appointed commissioner of the BIA. In many ways, he worked to reform government relations with the Native American tribes, but the reduction program was devastating for the Navajo, for whom their livestock was so important. The government set land capacity in terms of "sheep units". In 1930 the Navajos grazed 1,100,000 mature sheep units. These sheep provided half the cash income for the individual Navajo.

Collier's solution was to first launch a voluntary reduction program, which was made mandatory two years later in 1935. The government paid for part of the value of each animal, but it did nothing to compensate for the loss of future yearly income for many Navajo. In the matrilineal and matrilocal world of the Navajo, women were especially hurt, as many lost their only source of income with the reduction of livestock herds.

The Navajos did not understand why their centuries-old practices of raising livestock should change. They were united in opposition but they were unable to stop it. Historian Brian Dippie notes that the Indian Rights Association denounced Collier as a "dictator" and accused him of a "near reign of terror" on the Navajo reservation. Dippie adds that "He became an object of 'burning hatred' among the very people whose problems so preoccupied him." The long-term result was strong Navajo opposition to Collier's Indian New Deal.

=== Navajo code talkers in World War II ===
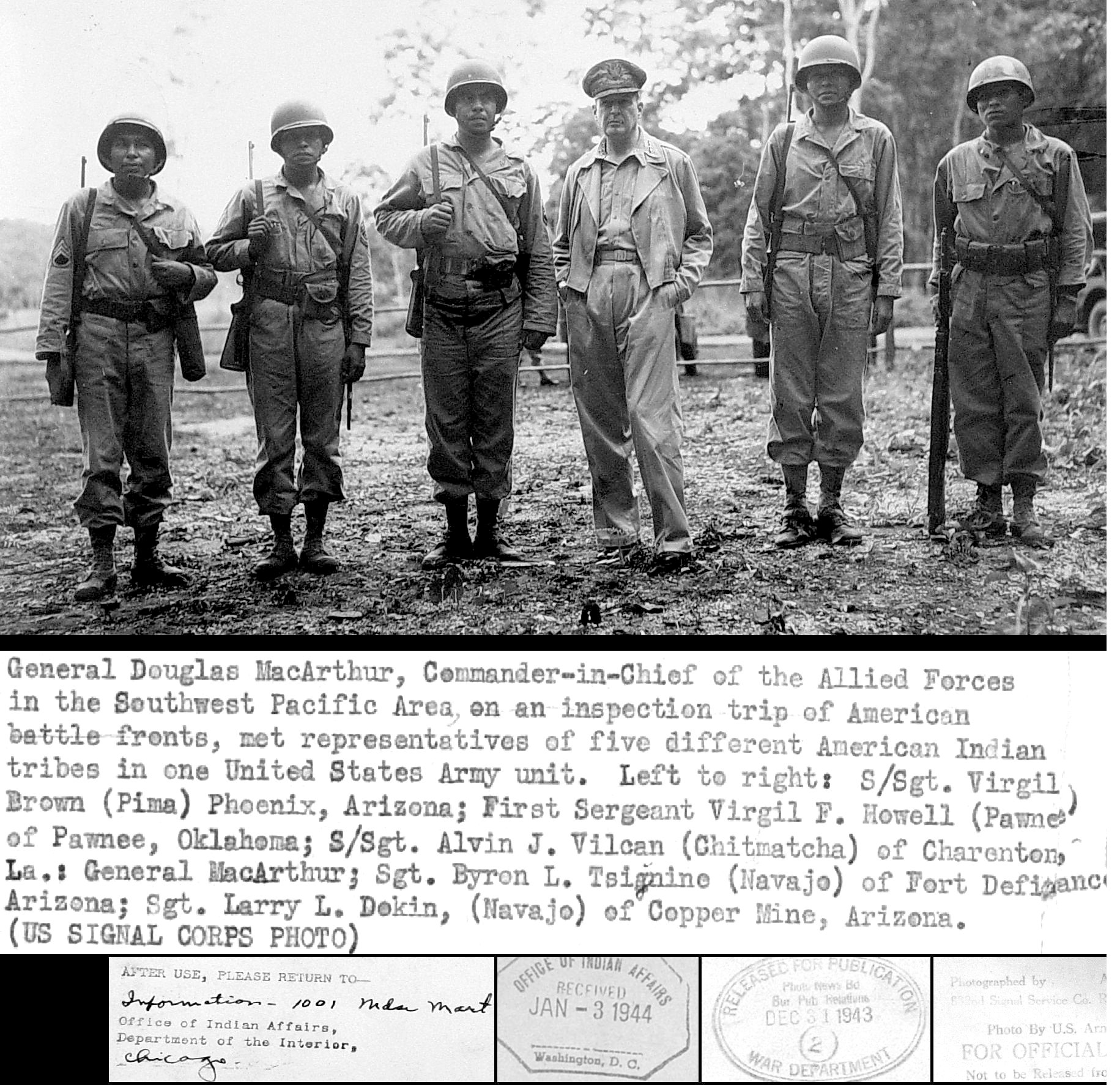
General Douglas MacArthur meeting Navajo, Pima, Pawnee and other Native American troops

Many Navajo young people moved to cities to work in urban factories during World War II. Many Navajo men volunteered for military service in keeping with their warrior culture, and they served in integrated units. The War Department in 1940 rejected a proposal by the BIA that segregated units be created for the Indians. The Navajos gained firsthand experience with how they could assimilate into the modern world, and many did not return to the overcrowded reservation, which had few jobs.

Up to four hundred Navajo code talkers played a significant role in United States Marine Corps (USMC) history. Using their own language, they utilized a military code; for example, the Navajo word 'turtle' represented a tank. In 1942, Marine staff officers composed several combat simulations and the Navajo translated it and transmitted it in their dialect to another Navajo on the other line. This Navajo then translated it back into English faster than any other cryptographic facility, which demonstrated their efficacy. As a result, General Vogel recommended their recruitment into the USMC code talker program.

Each Navajo went through a basic boot camp at the Marine Corps Recruit Depot in San Diego, before being assigned to Field Signal Battalion training at Camp Pendleton. Once the code talkers completed training in the States, they were sent to the Pacific for assignment to the Marine combat divisions. The Navajo language code was never deciphered by the Japanese. A higher number of Navajos volunteered for the code talker program than were accepted.

=== Uranium mining ===
In the 1940s, large quantities of uranium were discovered in Navajo land. From then into the early 21st century, the U.S. allowed mining without sufficient environmental protection for workers, waterways, and land. The Navajos have claimed high rates of death and illness from lung disease and cancer resulting from environmental contamination. Since the 1970s, legislation has helped to regulate the industry and reduce the toll.

== Culture ==
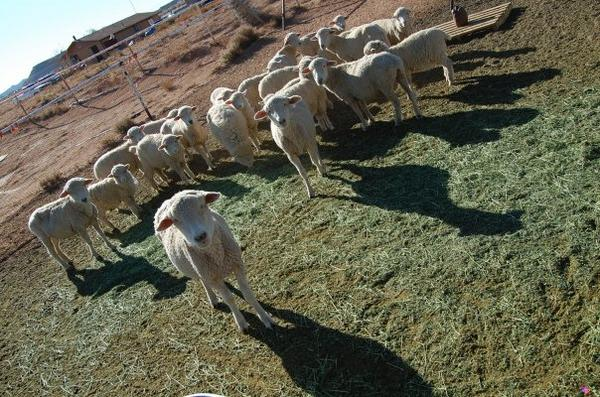
Dibé (sheep) remain an important aspect of Navajo culture.

The name Navajo comes from the late 18th century via the Spanish (Apaches de) Navajó '(Apaches of) Navajó', which was derived from the Tewa navahúuˀu 'farm fields adjoining a valley'. The Navajos call themselves Diné.

Like other Apacheans, the Navajos were semi-nomadic from the 16th through the 20th centuries. Their extended kinship groups had seasonal dwelling areas to accommodate livestock, agriculture, and gathering practices. As part of their traditional economy, Navajo groups may have formed trading or raiding parties, traveling relatively long distances.

=== Navajo clans or k’é ===
There is a system of clans or k’é that defines relationships between individuals and families. The clan system is exogamous: people can only marry (or date) partners outside their own clans, which for this purpose include the clans of their four grandparents. Some Navajos favor their children to marry into their father's clan. While clans are associated with a geographical area, the area is not for the exclusive use of any one clan. Members of a clan may live hundreds of miles apart but still have a clan bond.

Historically, the structure of the Navajo society is largely a matrilineal system, in which the family of the women owned livestock, dwellings, planting areas, and livestock grazing areas. Once married, a Navajo man would follow a matrilocal residence and live with his bride in her dwelling and near her mother's family. Daughters (or, if necessary, other female relatives) were traditionally the ones who received the generational property inheritance. In cases of marital separation, women would maintain the property and children. Children are "born to" and belong to the mother's clan, and are "born for" the father's clan. The mother's eldest brother has a strong role in her children's lives. As adults, men represent their mother's clan in tribal politics.

Traditionally, there are four clans said to be the original ones, given to the Navajo from Asdzą́ą́ Nádleehé or Changing Woman. Today there are more than 100 clans, some of which include other Native nations, such as Naashtʼézhí diné’e referring to the Zuni, of the Naashgalí diné’é, referring to the Mescalero Apache.

Traditional four Navajo clans
Navajo name	English name
Kinyaa’áanii	The Towering House clan
Honágháahnii	One-walks-around clan
Tódich’ii'nii	Bitter Water clan
Hashtł’ishnii	Mud clan

=== Gender roles ===
Similar to other Indigenous cultures, Navajo girls participate in a rite of passage ceremony that is a celebration of the transformation into womanhood. This event is marked with new experiences and roles within the community. Described as Kinaaldá, the ritual takes place over four days, during the individual's first or second menstrual period. The reason for this is rooted deeply in Navajo supernatural beliefs and their creation myths.

The third gender role of nádleehi (meaning "one who is transformed" or "one who changes"), beyond contemporary Anglo-American definition limits of gender, is part of the Navajo Nation society, a "two-spirit" cultural role. The renowned 19th-century Navajo artist Hosteen Klah (1849–1896) is an example.

Navajo values emphasize the masculine and the feminine, despite the ritual being centered around feminine gender roles. Historically, it is recorded that Navajo cultures respected the autonomy of women and their equality to men in the tribe, in multiple spheres of life within their society. Contrarily, the primary discourse in Western society regarding girls' puberty is associated with discreteness, to be experienced privately for concern of shame and embarrassment regarding menstruation and bodily changes.

Men and women are seen as contemporary equals as both males and females are needed to reproduce. Although women may carry a bigger burden, fertility is so highly valued that males are expected to provide economic resources (known as bridewealth). Corn is a symbol of fertility in Navajo culture as they eat white corn in the wedding ceremonies. It is considered to be immoral and/or stealing if one does not provide for the other in the premarital or marital relationship.

=== Traditional dwellings ===
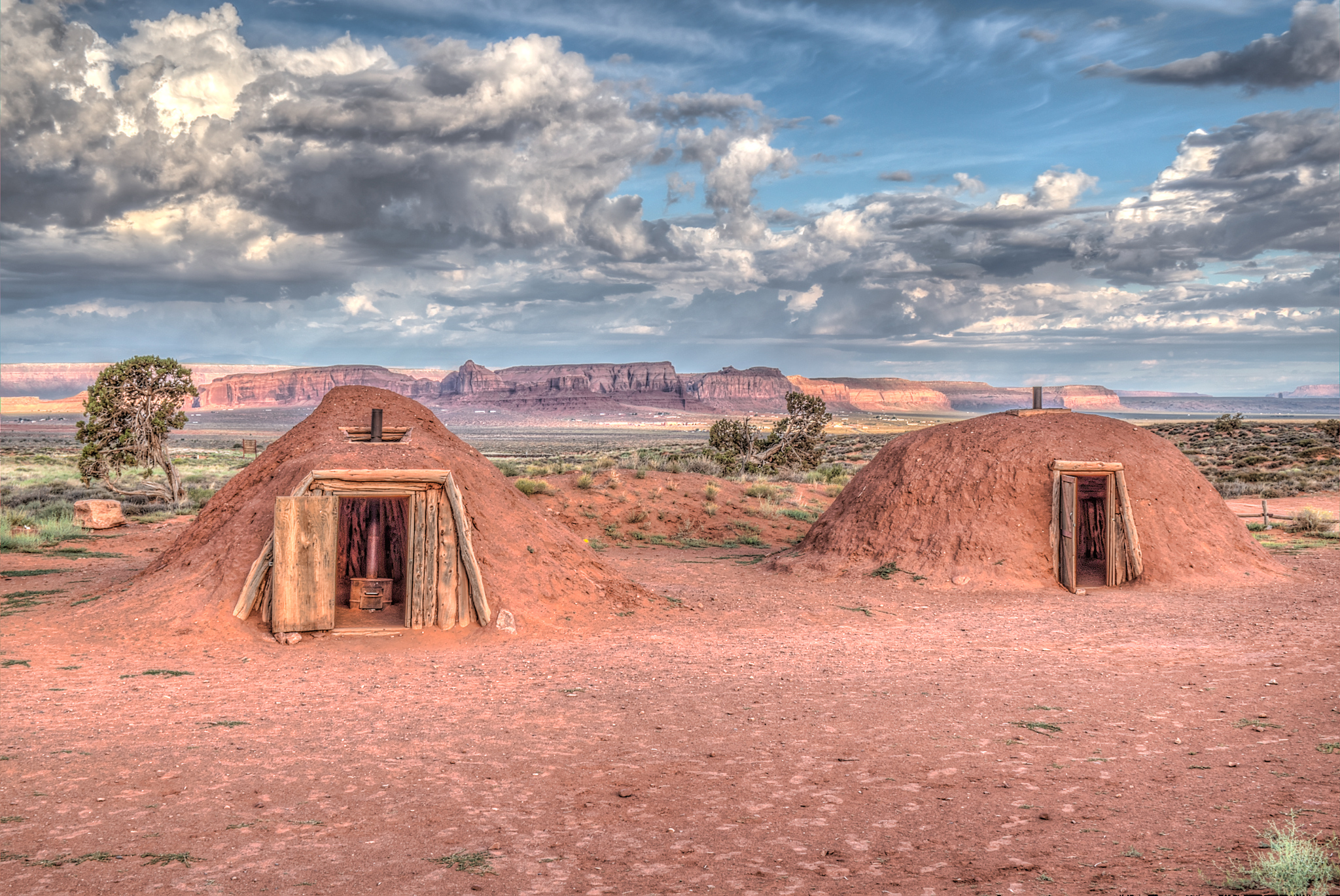
Hogan at Monument Valley Navajo Tribal Park

A hogan, the traditional Navajo home, is built as a shelter for either a man or a woman. Male hogans are square or conical with a distinct rectangular entrance, while a female hogan is an eight-sided house. Hogans are traditionally made of logs and covered in mud, with the door always facing east to welcome the sun each morning. Navajos also have several types of hogans for lodging and ceremonial use. Ceremonies, such as healing ceremonies or the kinaaldá, take place inside a hogan. According to Kehoe, this style of housing is distinctive to the Navajos. She writes, "Even today, a solidly constructed, log-walled Hogan is preferred by many Navajo families." Most Navajo people today live in apartments and houses in urban areas.

Those who practice the Navajo religion regard the hogan as sacred. The religious song "The Blessingway" (hózhǫ́ǫ́jí) describes the first hogan as being built by Coyote with help from Beavers to be a house for First Man, First Woman, and Talking God. The Beaver People gave Coyote logs and instructions on how to build the first hogan. Navajos made their hogans in the traditional style until the 1900s, when they started to make them in hexagonal and octagonal shapes. Hogans continue to be used as dwellings, especially by older Navajos, although they tend to be made with modern construction materials and techniques. Some are maintained specifically for ceremonial purposes.

=== Spiritual and religious beliefs ===
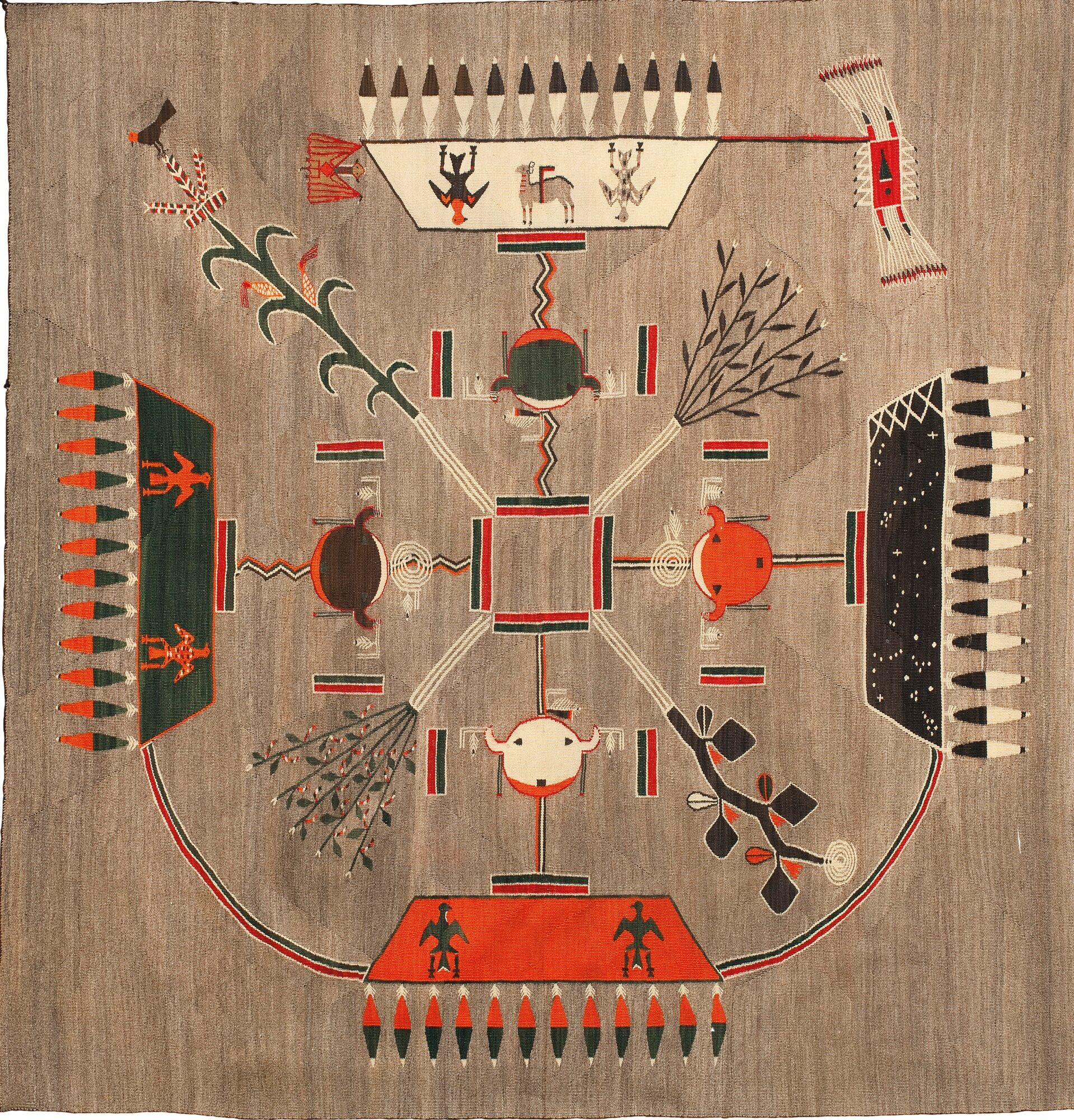
Navajo sandpainting style weaving representing the Four Worlds and four directions.

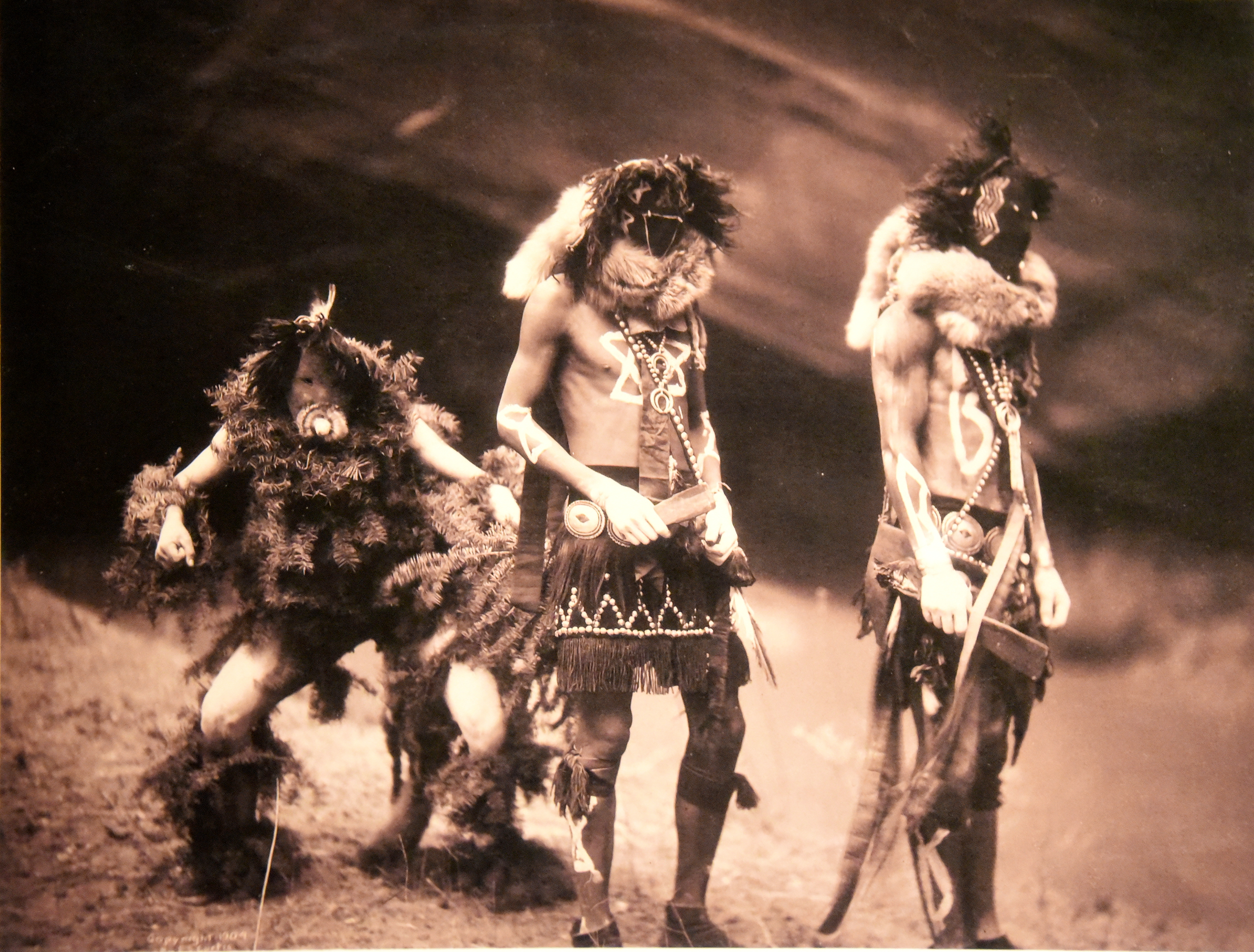
Navajo Yebichai (Yei Bi Chei) dancers. Edward S. Curtis. USA, 1900. The Wellcome Collection, London

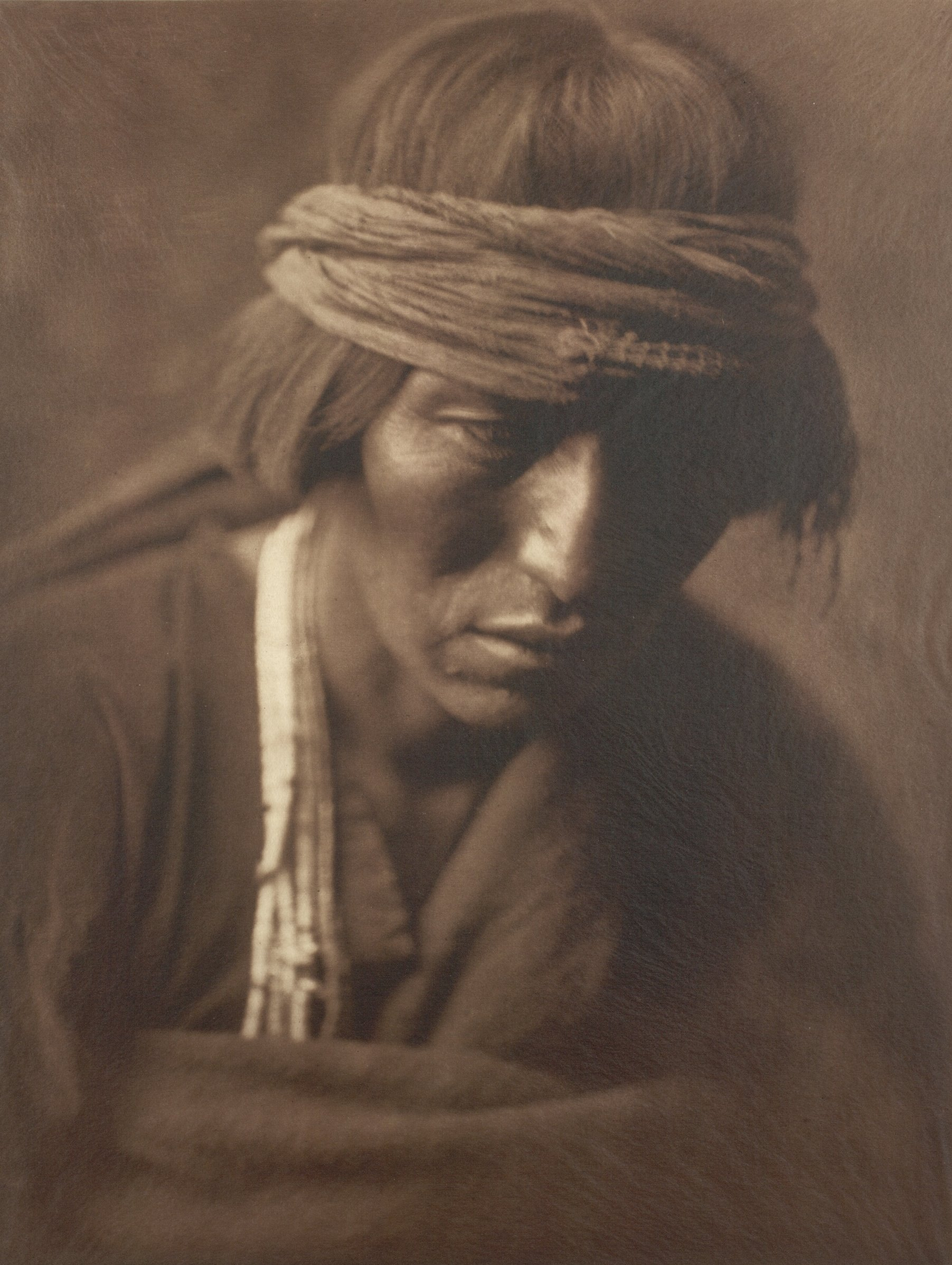
Hastobíga, a Hataałii photographed in 1904 by Edward S. Curtis

Navajo spiritual practice is about restoring balance and harmony to a person's life to produce health and is based on the ideas of Hózhóójí. The Diné believed in two classes of people: Earth People and Holy People. The Navajo people believe they passed through three worlds before arriving in this world, the Fourth World or the Glittering World. As Earth People, the Diné must do everything within their power to maintain the balance between Mother Earth and man. The Diné also had the expectation of keeping a positive relationship between them and the Diyin Diné. In the Diné Bahaneʼ (Navajo creation beliefs), the First, or Dark World is where the four Diyin Diné lived and where First Woman and First Man came into existence. Because the world was so dark, life could not thrive there and they had to move on. The Second, or Blue World, was inhabited by a few of the mammals Earth People know today as well as the Swallow Chief, or Táshchózhii. The First World beings had offended him and were asked to leave. From there, they headed south and arrived in the Third World or Yellow World. The four sacred mountains were found here, but due to a great flood, First Woman, First Man, and the Holy People were forced to find another world to live in. This time, when they arrived, they stayed in the Fourth World. In the Glittering World, true death came into existence, as well as the creation of the seasons, the moon, stars, and the sun.

The Holy People, or Diyin Diné, had instructed the Earth People to view the four sacred mountains as the boundaries of the homeland (Dinétah) they should never leave: Blanca Peak (Sisnaajiní — Dawn or White Shell Mountain) in Colorado; Mount Taylor (Tsoodził — Blue Bead or Turquoise Mountain) in New Mexico; the San Francisco Peaks (Dookʼoʼoosłííd — Abalone Shell Mountain) in Arizona; and Hesperus Mountain (Dibé Nitsaa — Big Mountain Sheep) in Colorado. Times of day, as well as colors, are used to represent the four sacred mountains. Throughout religions, the importance of a specific number is emphasized and in the Navajo religion, the number four appears to be sacred to their practices. For example, there were four original clans of Diné, four colors and times of day, four Diyin Diné, and for the most part, four songs sung for a ritual.

Navajos have many different ceremonies. For the most part, their ceremonies are to prevent or cure diseases. Corn pollen is used as a blessing and as an offering during prayer. One half of the major Navajo song ceremonial complex is the Blessing Way (Hózhǫ́ǫ́jí) and the other half is the Enemy Way (Anaʼí Ndááʼ). The Blessing Way ceremonies are based on establishing "peace, harmony, and good things exclusively" within the Diné. The Enemy Way, or Evil Way ceremonies are concerned with counteracting influences that come from outside the Diné. Spiritual healing ceremonies are rooted in Navajo traditional stories. One of them, the Night Chant ceremony, is conducted over several days and involves up to 24 dancers. The ceremony requires the dancers to wear buckskin masks, as do many of the other Navajo ceremonies, and they all represent specific gods. The purpose of the Night Chant is to purify the patients and heal them through prayers to the spirit beings. Each day of the ceremony entails the performance of certain rites and the creation of detailed sand paintings. One of the songs describes the home of the thunderbirds:

In Tsegihi [White House],
In the house made of the dawn,
In the house made of the evening light

The ceremonial leader proceeds by asking the Holy People to be present at the beginning of the ceremony, then identifying the patient with the power of the spirit-being, and describing the patient's transformation to renewed health with lines such as, "Happily I recover."

Ceremonies are used to correct curses that cause some illnesses or misfortunes. People may complain of witches who do harm to the minds, bodies, and families of innocent people, though these matters are rarely discussed in detail with those outside of the community.

=== Oral stories / works of literature ===
The Navajo Tribe relies on oral tradition to maintain beliefs and stories. Examples include the traditional creation story Diné Bahaneʼ. Some Navajo Indian legends are staples in literature, including The First Man and First Woman as well as the Sun, Moon, and Stars. The First Man and Woman is the story about the creation of the world, and The Sun, Moon, and Stars is the story about the origin of heavenly bodies.

=== Music ===
Music made by the Navajo people hails mostly from the Four Corners region of the Southwestern United States and the territory of the Navajo Nation. While it traditionally takes the shape of ceremonial chants and echoes themes found in Diné Bahaneʼ, contemporary Navajo music includes a wide range of genres, ranging from country music to rock and rap, performed in both English and Navajo.

=== Folklore ===
A skin-walker or yee naaldlooshii in the Navajo language, is a malevolent witch capable of transforming into or possessing animals such as wolves, crows, foxes, owls or coyotes.

=== Cuisine ===
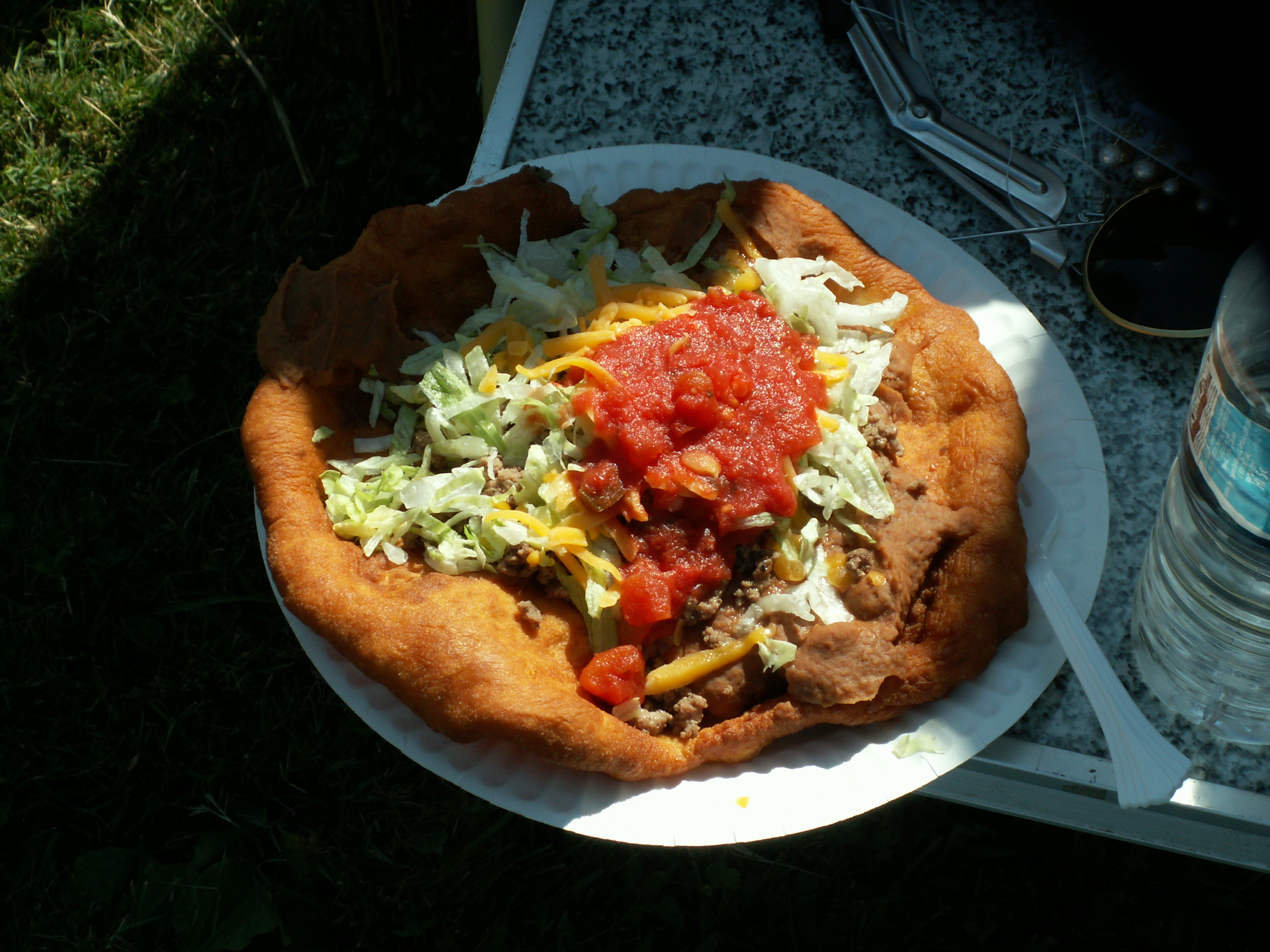
Navajo taco

Frybread was created when the Navajo were forced to relocate to New Mexico, and has been regarded as a symbol of Native American preserverance.

== Visual arts ==
=== Silverwork ===
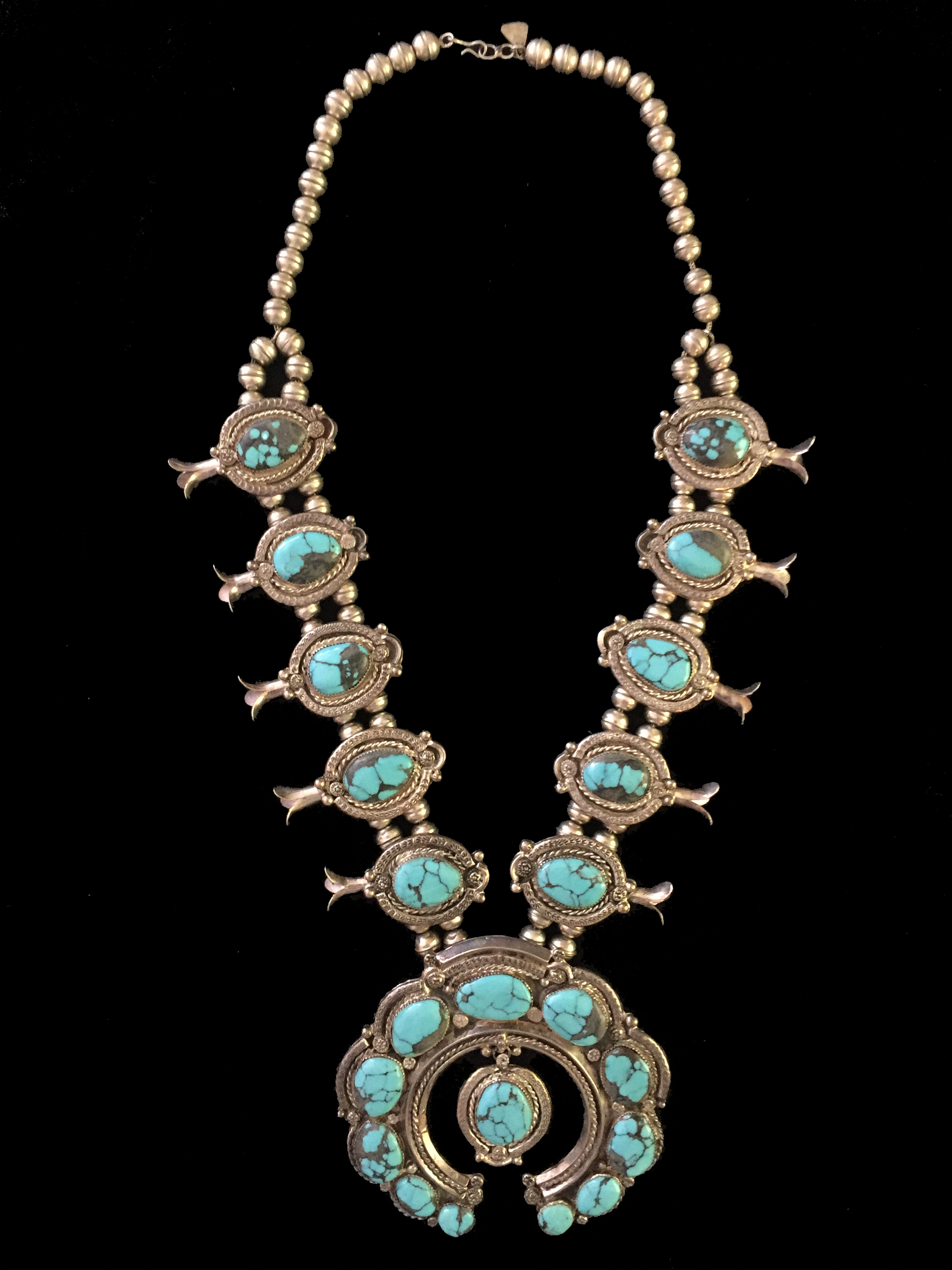
Squash Blossom Necklace by Annie Eagle

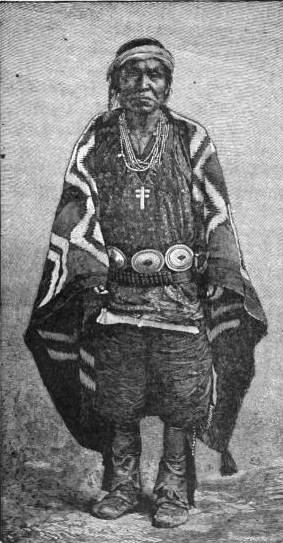
19th-century Navajo jewelry with the popular concho and dragonfly designs

Silversmithing is an important art form among Navajos. Atsidi Sani (c. 1830–c. 1918) is considered to be the first Southwest Indian to learn silversmithing. He learned silversmithing from a Mexican man called Nakai Tsosi ("Thin Mexican") around 1878 and began teaching other Navajos how to work with silver. Navajos initially obtained silver from coins and ingots and hammered them into shape. By 1880, Navajo silversmiths were creating handmade jewelry including bracelets, tobacco flasks, necklaces, and bracers. Later, they added silver earrings, buckles, bolos, hair ornaments, pins, and squash blossom necklaces for tribal use, and to sell to tourists as a way to supplement their income.

The Navajos' hallmark jewelry piece called the "squash blossom" necklace first appeared in the 1880s. The term "squash blossom" was apparently attached to the name of the Navajo necklace at an early date, although its bud-shaped beads are thought to derive from Spanish-Mexican pomegranate designs. The Navajo silversmiths also borrowed the naja (najahe in Navajo) symbol to shape the silver pendant that hangs from the "squash blossom" necklace.

Turquoise has been part of jewelry for centuries, but Navajo artists did not use inlay techniques to insert turquoise into silver designs until the late 19th century.

The Navajo are also known for their concha belts. The concha belt was derived from the Southern Plains Indians. Many Navajo silversmiths, including Atsidi Chon, have been claimed to be the first to create the concha belt. Chon taught his craft to other Navajos and to the Zuni people.

=== Weaving ===
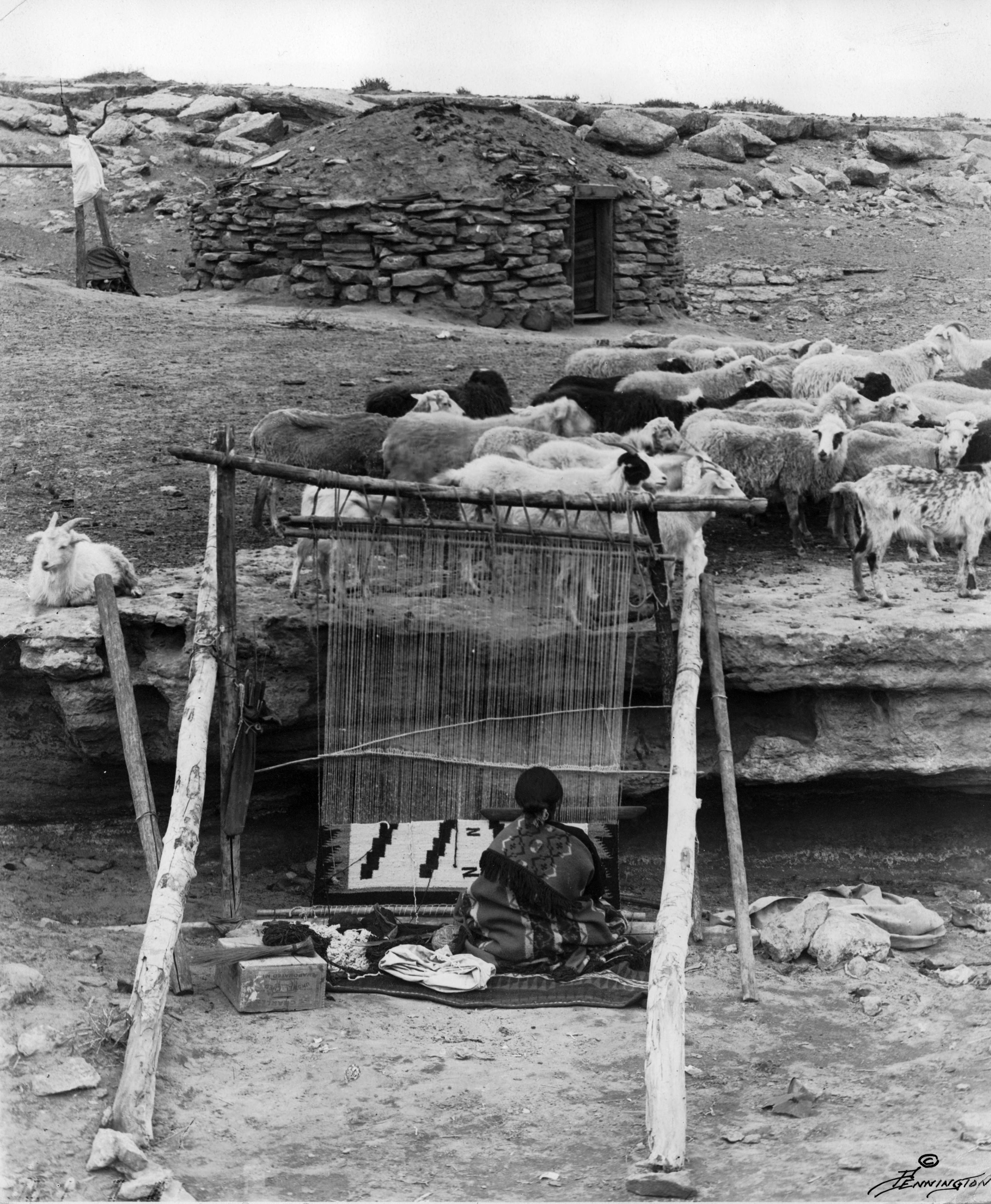
Navajo weaver with sheep

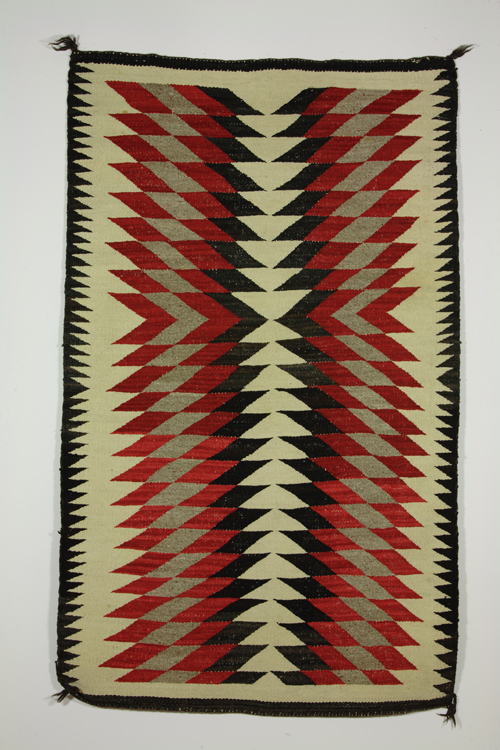
Navajo Germantown Eye Dazzler Rug, Science History Institute

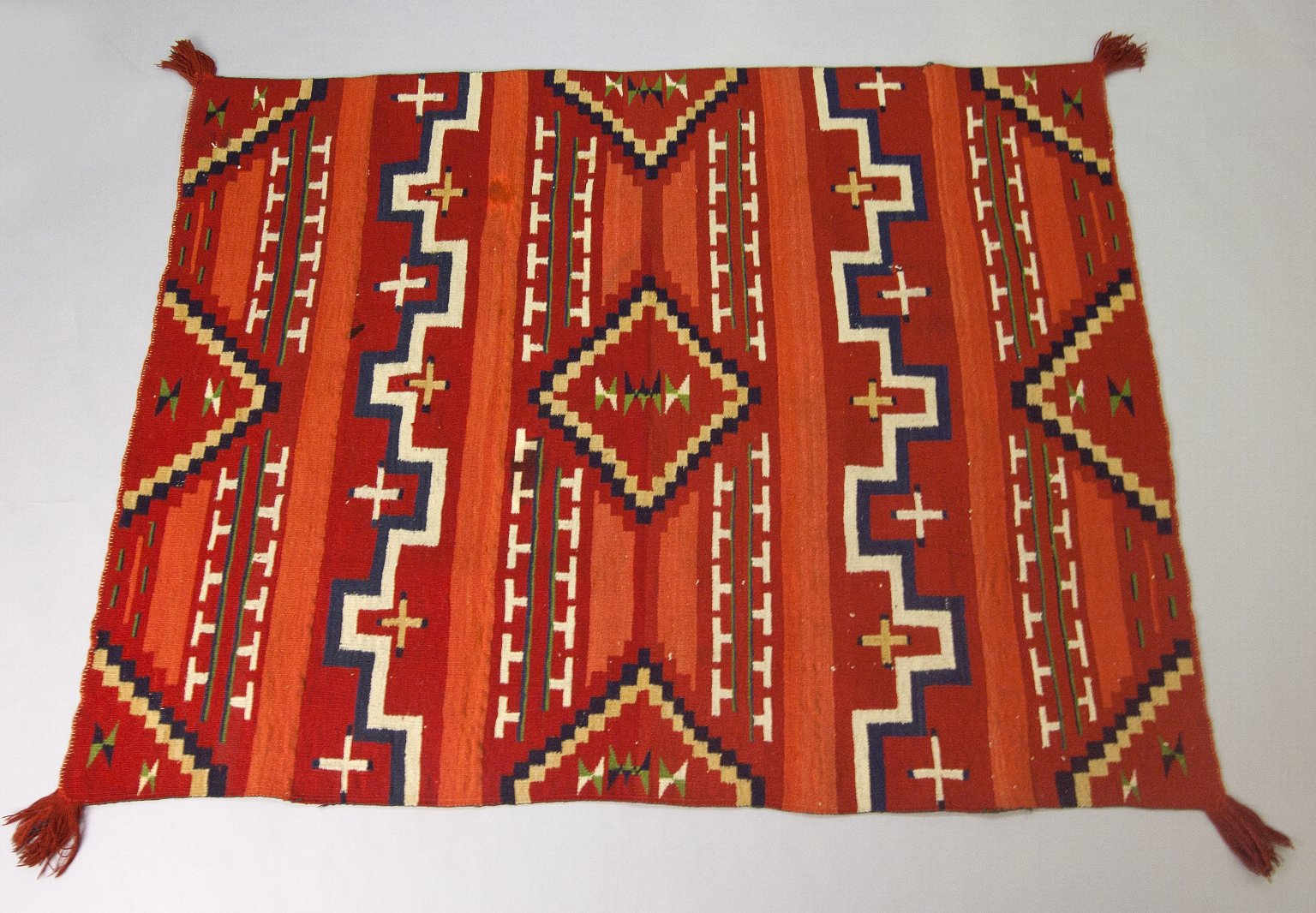
Probably Bayeta-style Blanket with Terrace and Stepped Design, 1870–1880, 50.67.54, Brooklyn Museum

Navajos came to the southwest with their own weaving traditions; however, they learned to weave cotton on vertical looms from the Pueblo peoples. The first Spaniards to visit the region wrote about seeing Navajo blankets. By the 18th century, the Navajos had begun to import Bayeta red yarn to supplement local black, gray, and white wool, as well as wool dyed with indigo. Using an upright loom, the Navajos made extremely fine utilitarian blankets that were collected by Ute and Plains Indians. These Chief's Blankets, so called because only chiefs or very wealthy individuals could afford them, were characterized by horizontal stripes and minimal patterning in red. First Phase Chief's Blankets have only horizontal stripes, Second Phase feature red rectangular designs, and Third Phase features red diamonds and partial diamond patterns.

The completion of the railroads dramatically changed Navajo weaving. Cheap blankets were imported, so Navajo weavers shifted their focus to weaving rugs for an increasingly non-Native audience. Rail service also brought in Germantown wool from Philadelphia, commercially dyed wool which greatly expanded the weavers' color palettes.

Some early European-American settlers moved in and set up trading posts, often buying Navajo rugs by the pound and selling them back east by the bale. The traders encouraged the locals to weave blankets and rugs into distinct styles. These included "Two Gray Hills" (predominantly black and white, with traditional patterns); Teec Nos Pos (colorful, with very extensive patterns); "Ganado" (founded by Don Lorenzo Hubbell), red-dominated patterns with black and white; "Crystal" (founded by J. B. Moore); oriental and Persian styles (almost always with natural dyes); "Wide Ruins", "Chinlee", banded geometric patterns; "Klagetoh", diamond-type patterns; "Red Mesa" and bold diamond patterns. Many of these patterns exhibit a fourfold symmetry, which is thought to embody traditional ideas about harmony or hózhǫ́.

== Population history ==
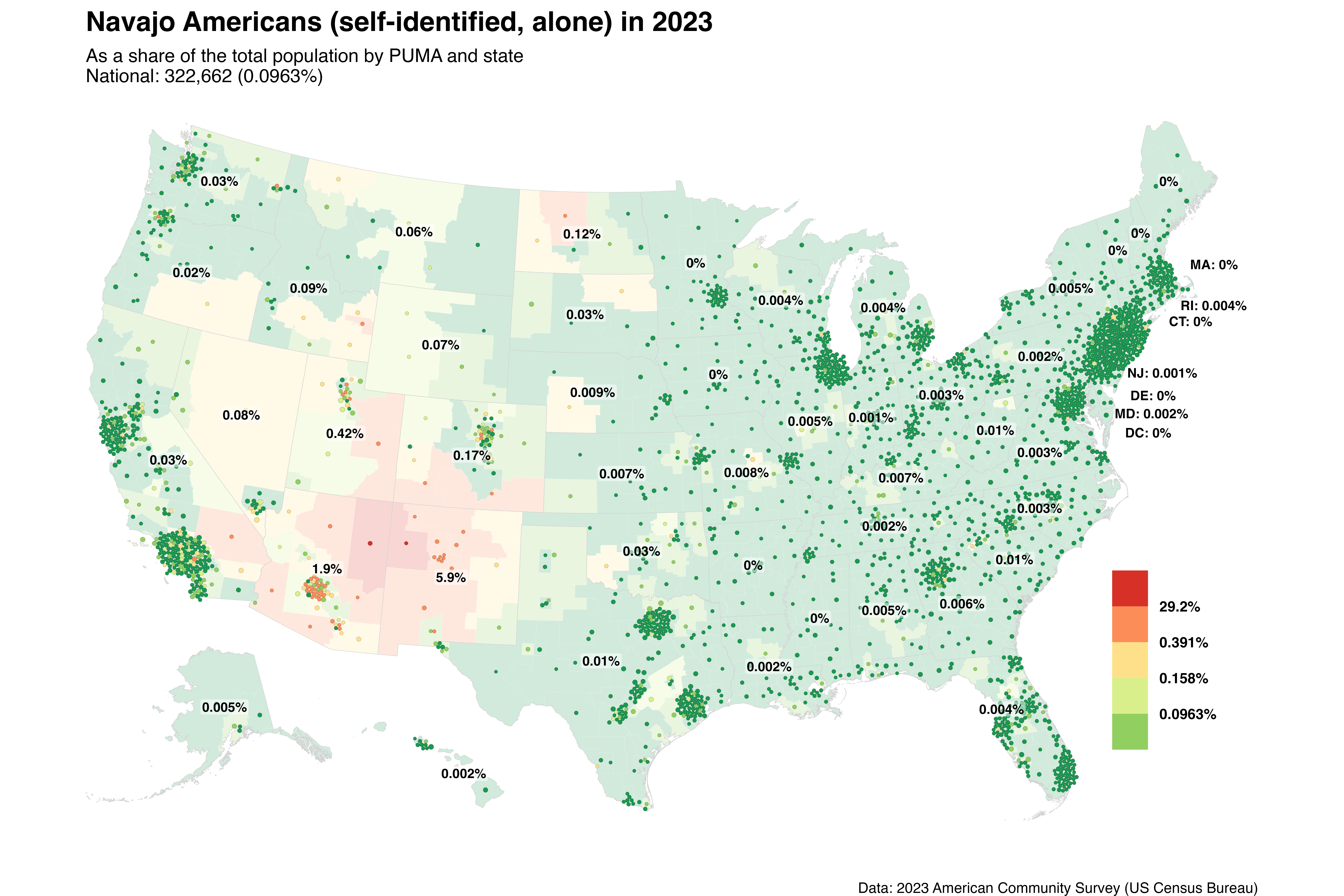
Map of Navajo in the United States

According to Alonso de Benavides, in 1626 the Navajo were so numerous that "in two days over 30,000 Navajos assembled". Apparently they were no less numerous in the early 20th century – in 1910, Indian Affairs counted 29,624 Navajos in Arizona and New Mexico (in addition, the 1910 census returned also 1,039 Navajos in Utah, for a total of at least 30,663). But the Navajos were a nomadic tribe, roaming over a very large area, so that an absolutely accurate enumeration even in year 1910 would have been an extremely difficult if not impossible task.

The U.S. census of 2020 reported that 315,086 Americans are Navajo alone while 108,326 are Navajo in combination with another race or tribal group.

== In the media ==
In 2000 the documentary The Return of Navajo Boy was shown at the Sundance Film Festival. It was written in response to an earlier film, The Navajo Boy which was somewhat exploitative of those Navajos involved. The Return of Navajo Boy allowed the Navajos to be more involved in the depictions of themselves.

In the final episode of the third season of the FX reality TV show 30 Days, the show's producer Morgan Spurlock spends thirty days living with a Navajo family on their reservation in New Mexico. The July 2008 episode, "Life on an Indian Reservation", depicts the dire conditions that many Native Americans experience living on reservations in the United States.

Tony Hillerman wrote a series of detective novels whose detective characters were members of the Navajo Tribal Police. The novels are noted for incorporating details about Navajo culture, and in some cases expanding the focus to include nearby Hopi and Zuni characters and cultures, as well. Some of the novels have been adapted for film and TV, including the series Dark Winds. His daughter has continued the novel series after his death.

In 1997, Welsh author Eirug Wyn published the Welsh-language novel I Ble'r Aeth Haul y Bore? (Where Did the Morning Sun Go? in English) which tells the story of Carson's misdoings against the Navajo people from the point of view of a fictional young Navajo woman called "Haul y Bore" ('Morning Sun').

== Navajo people ==
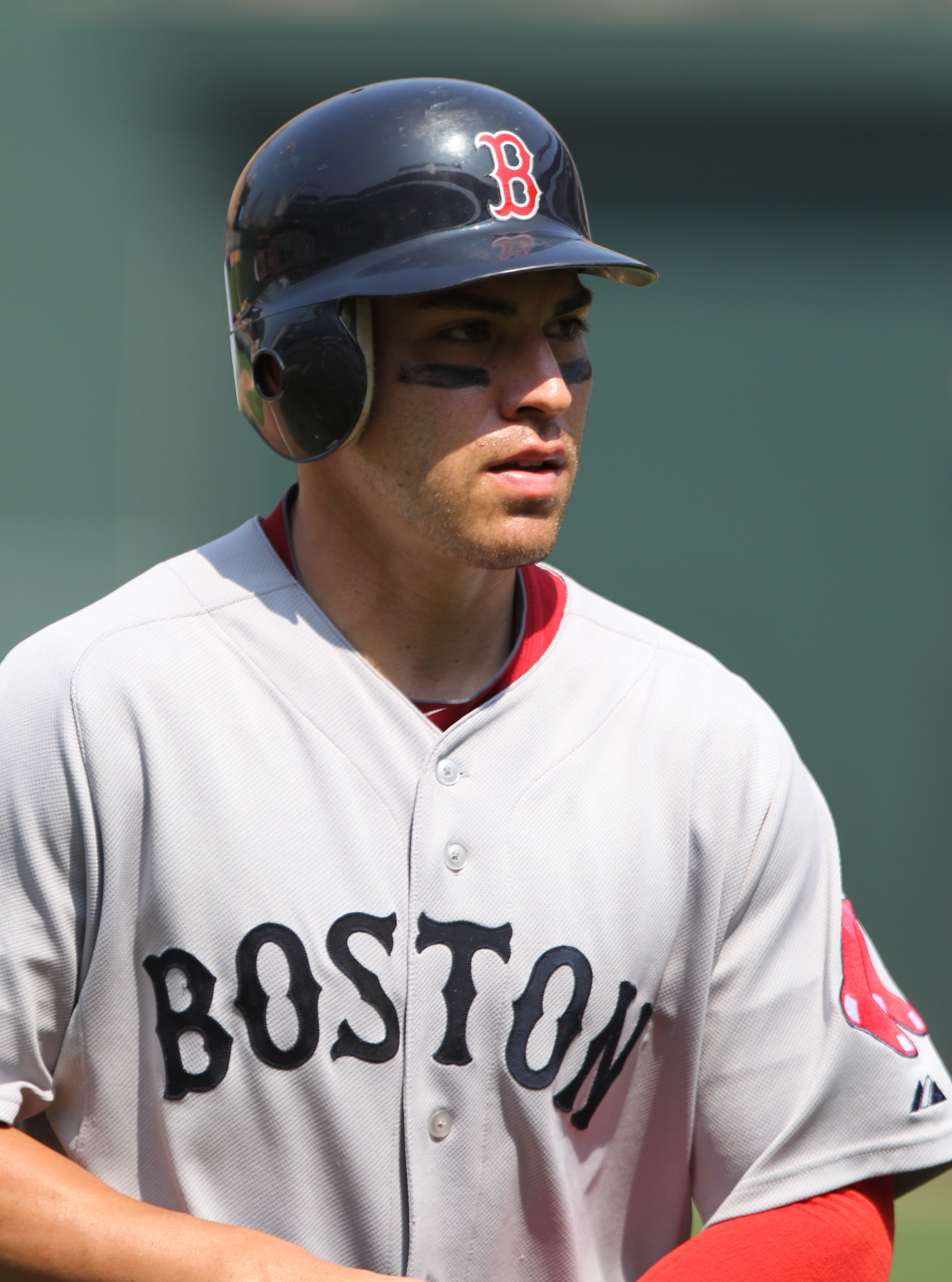
Jacoby Ellsbury, pictured in a Boston Red Sox uniform, is a Navajo (from his mother's side) retired baseball player

- Fred Begay, nuclear physicist and a Korean War veteran
- Notah Begay III (Navajo-Isleta-San Felipe Pueblo), American professional golfer
- Klee Benally, musician and documentary filmmaker
- Jacoby Ellsbury, professional baseball outfielder (enrolled Colorado River Indian Tribes)
- Rickie Fowler, American professional golfer
- Joe Kieyoomia, captured by the Imperial Japanese Army after the fall of the Philippines in 1942
- Nicco Montaño, former women's UFC flyweight champion
- Chester Nez, the last original Navajo code talker who served in the United States Marine Corps during World War II.
- Krystal Tsosie, geneticist and bioethicist known for promoting Indigenous data sovereignty and studying genetics within Indigenous communities
- Cory Witherill, first full-blooded Native American to race in the Indianapolis 500
- Aaron Yazzie, mechanical engineer at NASA's Jet Propulsion Laboratory

=== Artists ===
- Beatien Yazz (1928–2022), painter
- Apie Begay (fl. 1902), first Navajo artist to use European drawing materials
- D.Y. Begay (born 1953), weaver
- Harrison Begay (1914–2012), Studio painter
- Joyce Begay-Foss, weaver, educator, and museum curator
- Mary Holiday Black (c. 1934–2022), basket maker
- Nanibah Chacon (born 1980), painter
- Raven Chacon (born 1977), conceptual artist
- Lorenzo Clayton (born 1940), artist
- Carl Nelson Gorman (also known as Kin-Ya-Onny-Beyeh; 1907–1998), painter, printmaker, illustrator, and Navajo code talker with the U.S. Marine Corps during World War II.
- R. C. Gorman (1932–2005), painter and printmaker
- Hastiin Klah (1867–1937), weaver and co-founder of the Wheelwright Museum of the American Indian
- David Johns (born 1948), painter
- Yazzie Johnson (born 1946), contemporary silversmith
- Betty Manygoats (born 1945), Táchiiʼnii, contemporary ceramicist
- Christine Nofchissey McHorse (1948–2021), ceramicist
- Gerald Nailor, Sr. (1917–1952), studio painter
- Barbara Teller Ornelas (born 1954), master Navajo weaver, cultural ambassador of the U.S. State Department
- Atsidi Sani (c. 1828–1918), first known Navajo silversmith
- Marilou Schultz (born 1954), textile artist and math teacher
- Clara Nezbah Sherman (1914–2010), weaver
- Ryan Singer (born 1973), painter, illustrator, screen printer
- Tommy Singer (1940–2014), silversmith and jeweler
- Quincy Tahoma (1920–1956), studio painter
- Tyrrell Tapaha, 21st-century weaver and printmaker
- Klah Tso (mid-19th century — early 20th century), pioneering easel painter
- Emmi Whitehorse (born 1957), contemporary painter
- Melanie Yazzie (born 1966), contemporary print maker and educator
- Teresa Montoya, film maker

=== Performers ===
- Jeremiah Bitsui, actor
- Blackfire, punk/alternative rock band
- Raven Chacon, composer
- Radmilla Cody, traditional singer and the 46th Miss Navajo Winner
- James and Ernie, comedy duo
- Carmen Moore, actress
- R. Carlos Nakai, musician
- Jock Soto, ballet dancer

=== Politicians ===
- Chris Deschene, veteran, attorney, engineer, and a community leader. One of few Native Americans to be accepted into the U.S. Naval Academy in Annapolis. Upon graduation, he was commissioned as a 2nd Lt. in the U.S. Marine Corps. He made an unsuccessful attempt to run for Navajo Nation President.
- Henry Chee Dodge, last head chief of the Navajo and first chairman of the Navajo Tribe, (1922–1928, 1942–1946).
- Annie Dodge Wauneka, former Navajo Tribal Councilwoman and advocate.
- Thomas Dodge, former chairman of the Navajo Tribe and first Diné attorney.
- Albert Hale, former president of the Navajo Nation. He served in the Arizona Senate from 2004 to 2011 and in the Arizona House of Representatives from 2011 to 2017.
- Christina Haswood, member of the Kansas House of Representatives since 2021.
- Peter MacDonald, Navajo Code Talker and former chairman of the Navajo Tribe.
- Mark Maryboy (Aneth/Red Mesa/Mexican Water), former Navajo Nation Council Delegate, working in Utah Navajo Investments.
- Lilakai Julian Neil, the first woman elected to Navajo Tribal Council.
- Jonathan Nez, former president of the Navajo Nation. He served three terms as Navajo Council delegate representing the chapters of Shonto, Oljato, Tsah Bi Kin and Navajo Mountain. Served two terms as Navajo County Board of Supervisors for District 1.
- Buu Nygren, current president of the Navajo Nation.
- Ben Shelly, former president of the Navajo Nation.
- Joe Shirley, Jr., former president of the Navajo Nation.
- Chris Stearns, member of the Washington House of Representatives since 2022.
- Peterson Zah, first president of the Navajo Nation and last chairman of the Navajo Tribe.

=== Writers ===
- Freddie Bitsoie, author and chef
- Sherwin Bitsui, author and poet
- Luci Tapahonso, poet and lecturer
- Elizabeth Woody, author, educator, and environmentalist
- Danielle Geller, author and archivist

== See also ==
- Navajo-Churro sheep
- Navajo pueblitos
- Navajoceratops

== Bibliography ==
- Adair, John (1989) [1944]. The Navajo and Pueblo Silversmiths (paperback ed.). Norman: University of Oklahoma Press. ISBN 978-0-8061-2215-1.
- Iverson, Peter (2006). The Navajo. Jennifer Denetdale (additional text), Ada E. Deer (foreword). New York: Chelsea House Publishers. ISBN 0-7910-8595-3.
- Kehoe, Alice Beck (1992). North American Indians: A Comprehensive account (2nd ed.). Upper Saddle River (NJ): Prentice-Hall. ISBN 978-0136243625. (3rd edition, 2006, ISBN 978-0131928763)
- Pritzker, Barry M. (2000). A Native American Encyclopedia: History, Culture, and Peoples. Oxford: Oxford University Press. ISBN 978-0-19-513877-1.
- Sandner, Donald (1991). Navaho symbols of healing: a Jungian exploration of ritual, image, and medicine. Rochester (VT): Healing Arts Press. ISBN 978-0-89281-434-3.
- Sides, Hampton (2006). Blood and Thunder: An Epic of the American West (2nd ed.). Doubleday. ISBN 978-0-385-50777-6.
