= Bolo tie =

Type of necktie

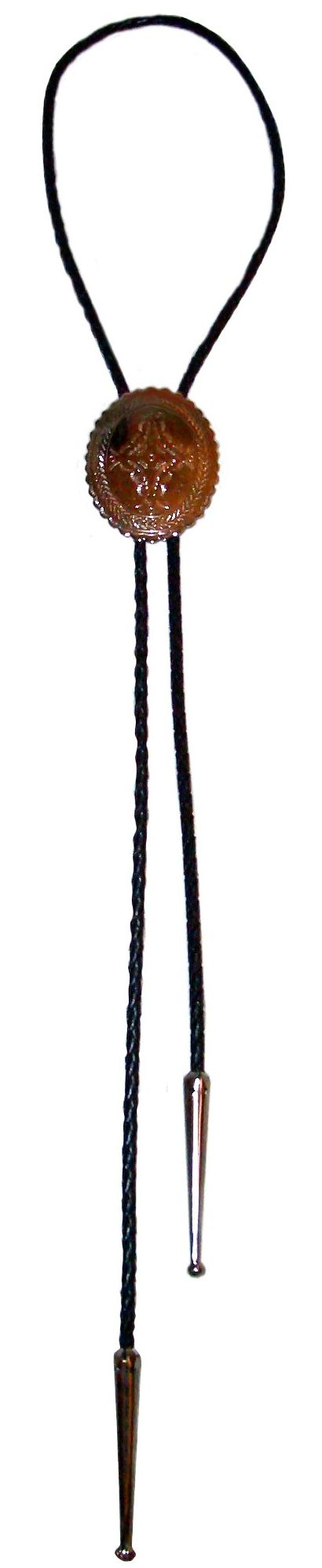
Bolo tie

A bolo tie (sometimes bola tie or shoestring necktie) is a type of necktie consisting of a piece of cord or braided leather with decorative metal tips (called aiguillettes) and secured with an ornamental clasp or slide.

== Popularity ==
In the United States, bolo ties are widely associated with Western wear and are generally most common in the western areas of the country. Bolo tie slides and tips in silver have been part of Hopi, Navajo, Zuni, and Puebloan silversmithing traditions since the mid-20th century.

The bolo tie was made the official neckwear of Arizona on April 22, 1971, by Governor Jack Williams. New Mexico passed a non-binding measure to designate the bolo as the state's official neckwear in 1987. On March 13, 2007, New Mexico Governor Bill Richardson signed into law that the bolo tie was the state's official tie. Also in 2007, the bolo tie was named the official tie of Texas.

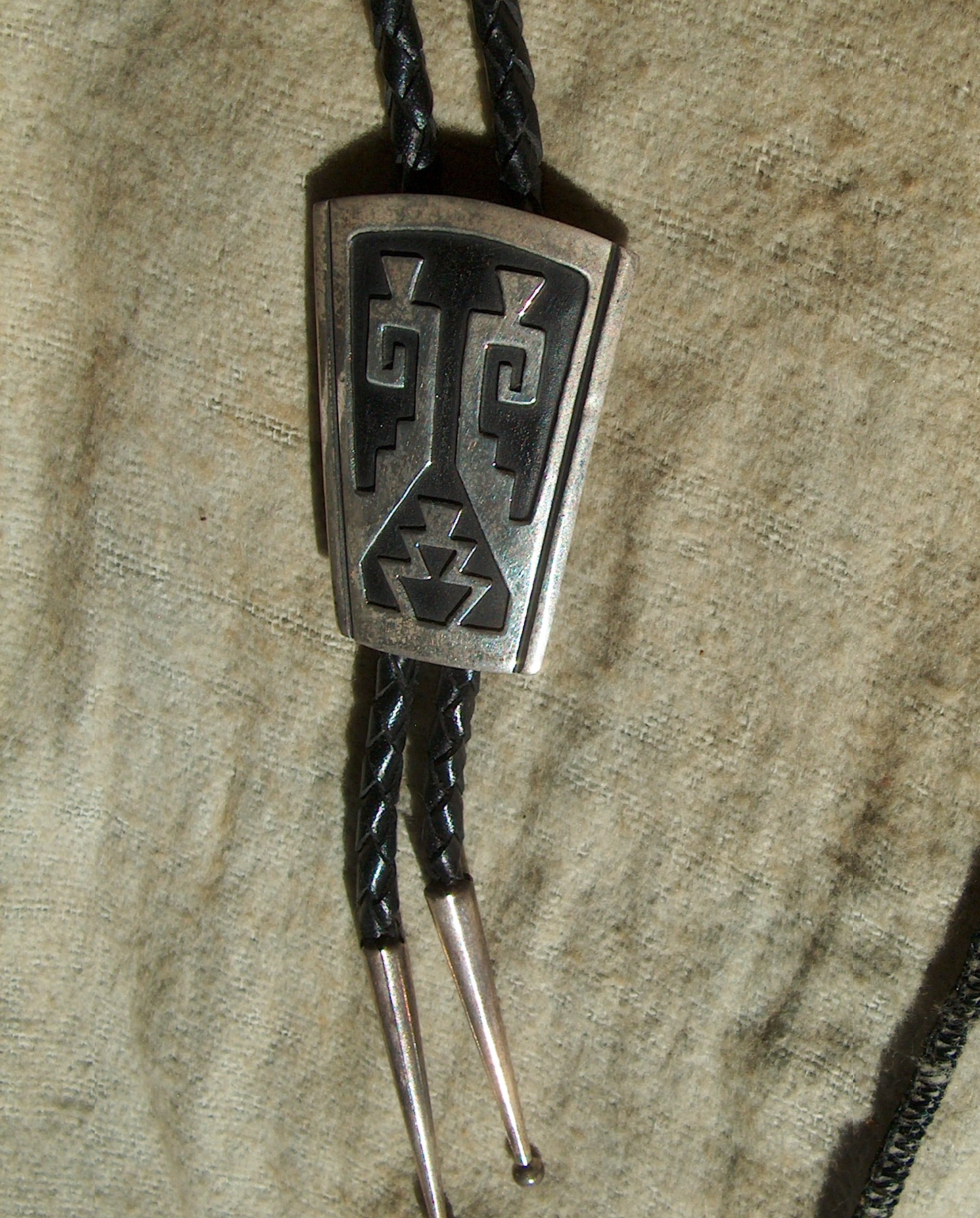
A bolo tie by Tommy Singer

In the United Kingdom, bolo ties are known as bootlace ties. They were popular with 1950s Teddy Boys, who wore them with drape suits.

Bolo ties became fashionable in the 1980s with rockabilly revivalists and new wavers. The bolo tie returned as a popular fashion accessory in the fall of 1988 when male Hollywood stars would be frequently found wearing them. Chain stores like Jeanswest and Merry-Go-Round sold multiple choices for all occasions.

During the 1980s and 1990s bolo ties, some elegant and expensive, were sold in Japan, Korea, and China. Some had fancy, hand-made cords and unusual tips. Sales overseas skyrocketed post-1970s; this was due to the overflow from the United States, where it had fallen out of fashion in the 1980s.

Horror host and author Joe Bob Briggs is known by his trademark wearing of various bolo ties during his televised and live shows.

During the 2013 NFL season, San Diego Chargers quarterback Philip Rivers captured media attention for his frequent use of bolo ties. He was noted wearing one again after defeating the Cincinnati Bengals in the 2013–14 NFL playoffs.

== Origins ==
Victor Cedarstaff of Wickenburg, Arizona, claims to have invented the bolo tie in the late 1940s and later patented his slide design.

== See also ==
- Neckerchief
