= Atsidi Sani =

American Navajo silversmith (1830 – c. 1870 or 1918)

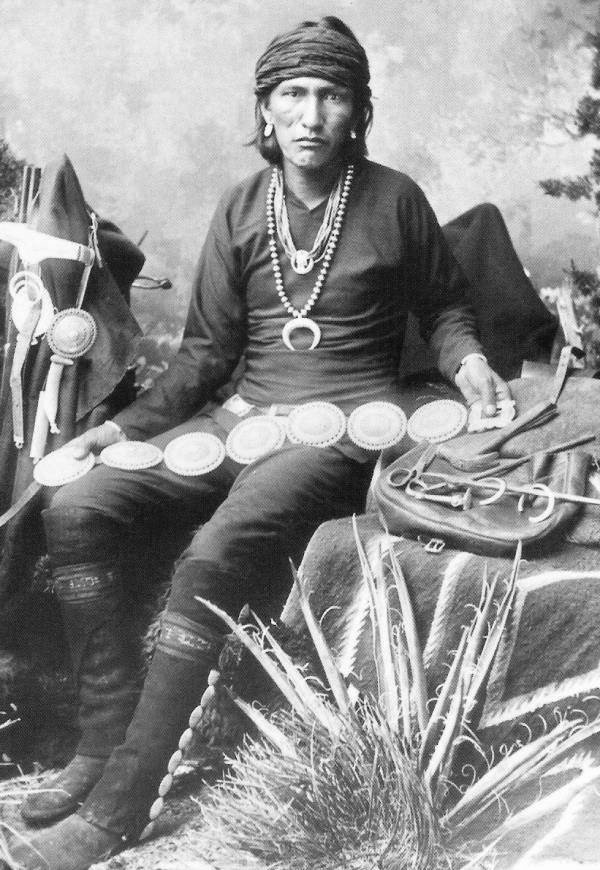
Atsidi Sani in 1883

Atsidi Sani (Navajo: Atsidii Sání) (c. 1830 – c. 1870 or 1918) was the first known Navajo silversmith.

== Background ==
Sani was born near Wheatfields, Apache County, Arizona, c. 1830 as part of the Dibelizhini (Black Sheep) clan. He was known by many names, but to his people, he was known as Atsidi Sani, which translates to "Old Smith," and to the Spaniards he was known as Herrero, which means "Iron Worker." Some of his other names included, Delgadito (Little Thin), Herrero Delgado (Thin Smith), and Beshiltheeni (Metal Worker, Knife Maker). In addition to being a silversmith and a blacksmith, he was also a medicine man, spiritual keader, ceremonial singer, and a Navajo chief.

Sani played an important role in the history of Navajo silversmithing. He is known by many to be the first Navajo silversmith, although his main focus was blacksmithing; working with iron. Many agree that he learned silversmithing in the year 1853. According to Navajo tribal leader, Chee Dodge, Sani must have learned to work iron around the age of 25. Dodge knew Sani personally. In fact, he used to assist Sani in walking, as Sani became blind in his older years. Furthermore, Sani learned his blacksmithing skills from a Spaniard man who the Navajo nicknamed "Nakai Tsosi" whose name translates to "Thin Spaniard". Sani decided that he wanted to learn to make bridles so that he could sell them to his people, who otherwise bought their bridles from the Mexicans. He became good friends with Tsosi and eventually learned to work iron by watching him work.

Between the years 1850 and 1865, Sani was the "most important iron smith". His iron work seems to have consisted mostly of bridles. Grey Moustache recalls "watching Atsidi Sani make bridle bits out of pieces of scrap iron. He made them with jingles hanging from the bottom." In addition, as a silversmith, he was just as equally important. "Both traditional and documentary evidence point to the 'old smith' as being the 'daddy of silversmiths.'" Some of his early silver work consisted of conchas, bracelets, and a variety of other jewelry pieces, the first of which was generally agreed to have been made in 1853.

Sani became a prominent chief for the Navajo at Fort Defiance, Arizona by 1858. He became an active political leader, while continuing his craft in silversmithing.

== Legacy ==
Once Sani became skilled enough in working silver, he passed on his knowledge of silversmithing to his four sons, Big Black, Red Smith, Little Smith, and Burnt Whiskers. In 1890, Sani "became a paid teacher." One of his more important students was his younger brother, Slender Maker of Silver, who was one of the best silversmiths of his time, according to Chee Dodge. Slender Maker of Silver also learned some of his skills from a man by the name of Atsidi Chon (Ugly Smith), who was a brother-in-law to Grey Moustache.

== Death ==
There seems to be debate on the year in which Sani died. One source cites that Sani died near what is now Chinle, Arizona in 1870. Through another source, it seems as though Sani lived a long life. Chee Dodge spoke of how Sani, used to live near Washington Pass, which was not far from where Dodge lived. He used to go to Dodge just to visit. According to Dodge, Sani died around the year 1918 and "must have been over 90 years old" at the time of his death.
