= Tommy Singer =

Navajo silversmith (1940–2014)

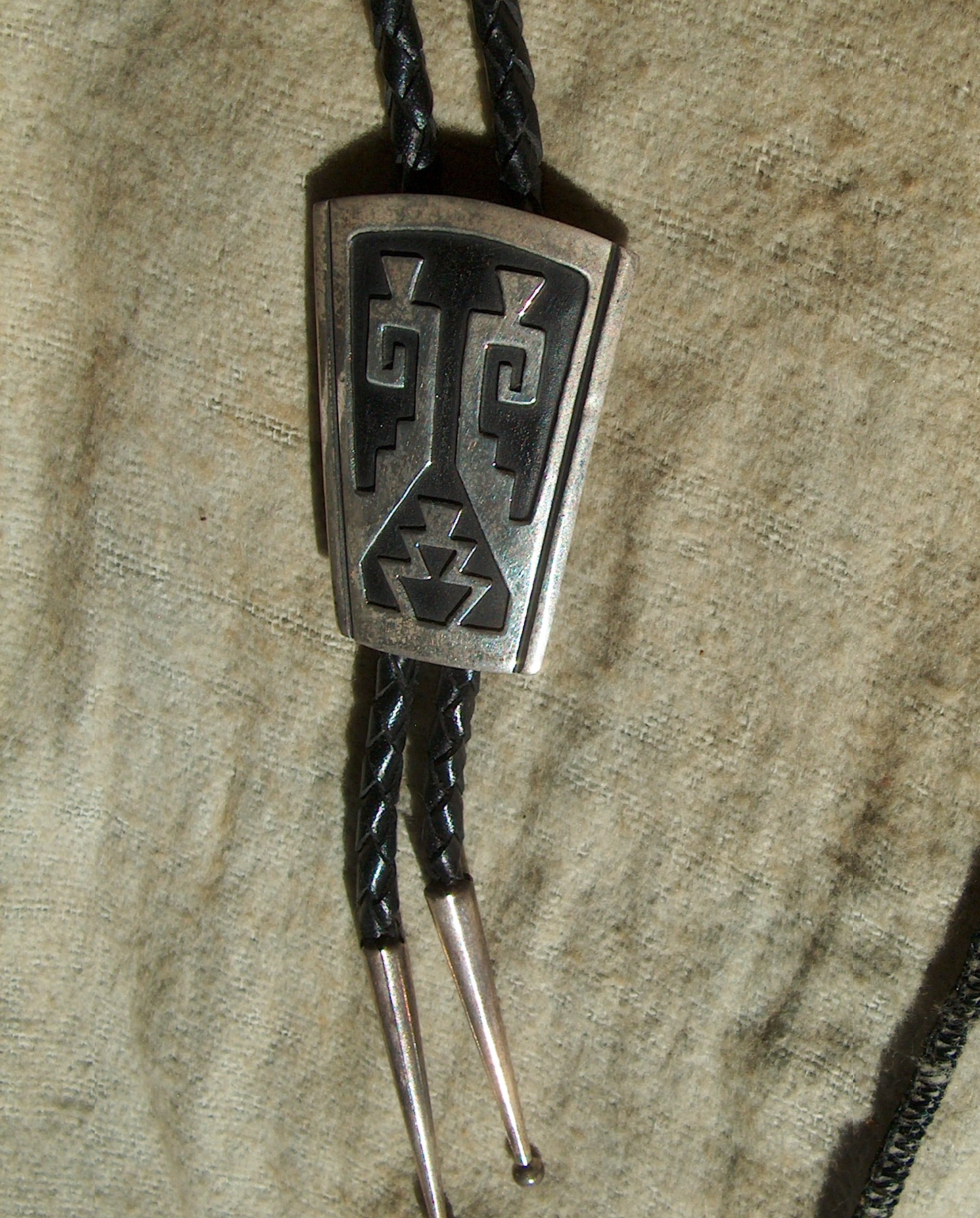
- Silver overlay bolo tie by Tommy Singer, ca. 1980s
- Born: 1940; Phoenix, Arizona, United States
- Died: May 31, 2014 (aged approx. 74); Blue Gap, AZ
- Education: Trained by father
- Known for: Silversmithing
- Website: https://www.pueblodirect.com/collections/tommy-singer

Tommy Singer (1940 – May 31, 2014) was a Navajo silversmith who specialized in chip-inlay jewelry. He died in a motorcycle accident on May 31, 2014. His inlaid turquoise, coral, and silver pieces incorporated traditional Navajo designs. Singer gained acclaim as the originator of the chip inlay design which he developed in the 1970s.

Singer was a member of the Navajo Nation from Winslow, Arizona. He perfected his craft working on the Navajo reservation in a small studio surrounded by his family and other tribal members.

He grew up on the Navajo Reservation and was taught silversmithing by his father at the age of seven. In the 1960s he invented the "chip-inlay" technique of using turquoise or coral chips in this silverwork. This technique has become widespread in his community. He also used stamps and work in overlay.

When asked about his work, Singer said,"Every piece is made with the various meanings from my traditional ways – the Navajo way of living. My father was a silversmith, too. He taught me, and wanted me to continue this trade. It was my father's dream that I learn to silversmith so that I could continue his beliefs."

After his death, his wife, Rosita (Rose), has continued to create jewelry using designs Singer created prior to his passing. These items are stamped with "T&R Singer."

== See also ==
- List of Native American artists
- Visual arts by indigenous peoples of the Americas
