= Teresa Montoya =

American film director

Academic background
- Thesis: Permeable: Politics of Extraction and Exposure on the Navajo Nation (2019)

Academic work
- Discipline: Anthropology
- Sub-discipline: sociocultural anthropology, legal anthropology, visual anthropology
- Institutions: University of Chicago
- Website: https://teresamontoya.squarespace.com

Teresa Montoya is a Diné media maker and social scientist with training in socio-cultural anthropology, critical Indigenous studies, and filmmaking.

== Early life ==
Teresa grew up in Western Colorado.

Teresa received a Bachelor of Arts (BA) at the University of San Diego in Spanish and Interdisciplinary Humanities with an emphasis in Art History in 2006. She then went on to pursue a Master of Arts (MA) in Anthropology at the University of Denver with an emphasis in Museum Studies, which she completed in 2011. In 2019, she completed her Doctorate (PhD) in Anthropology at New York University. Her dissertation, titled Permeable: Politics of Extraction and Exposure on the Navajo Nation, approaches territorial dispossession and environmental toxicity as they relate to tribal jurisdiction and settler colonialism in contemporary Diné communities in present-day northern Arizona and New Mexico. Teresa is currently a Provost's Postdoctoral Fellow in the Department of Anthropology at the University of Chicago.

Teresa's grandfather, Thomas Lynch Jr., served the US Army in the World War II from May 1943 to December 1945 with the 42 Rainbow Division. He was captured during the Battle of the Bulge and held as a German Prisoner of war for almost four months. He died at the age of 98 on July 27, 2021, at Window Rock, Arizona.

== Art practice ==
Montoya's art practice reflects her background and knowledge of filmmaking, and includes photography. Her 2016 body of work Yellow Water responds to the aftermath of the Gold King Mine Spill, which occurred in 2015. Positing territorial dispossession and environmental toxicity as pervasive features of contemporary Indigenous life, this body of work critically engages with photography to trace the acidic mine waste discharged into the Animas and San Juan rivers that flow across the Navajo Nation. This body of work, including photographs, audio, and bottles filled with contaminated water, was exhibited in 2019 at the Morris and Helen Belkin Art Gallery in Vancouver, British Columbia, for the Spill exhibition.

=== Doing the Sheep Good ===
In 1966, anthropologist John Adair and Sol Worth intended to teach students some basic filmmaking skills in order to understand how another culture might conceptualise filmmaking differently. Their purpose was to understand culture-bound ways of representation. When they presented their idea to several Navajo members, Sam Yazzie, the leading elder of the community asked, "Will making movies do the sheep good?" Worth replied that it would not. To this Yazzie responded, "Then why make movies?" The project led to the series Navajo Film Themselves made by Navajo youth at Pine Springs, Arizona. The process is documented in Adair and Worth's book Through Navajo Eyes: An Exploration in Film Communication and Anthropology published by Indiana University Press in 1972 and republished by University of New Mexico Press in 1997.

In 2013, Montoya directed the film Doing the Sheep Good, which reinvigorates Diné relationships to community and filmmaking. The film charts the life of the films and photographs in the series as they are about to be repatriated to their community. The seven films that were part of the series became iconic but had been rarely seen by other Navajos. Doing the Sheep Good documents the homecoming of these films as they are screened for the first time in 46 years.

Doing the Sheep Good has been screened at festivals across the United States and in Brazil.

The movie won the short film award at the 2014 Futures of Visual Anthropology Conference at Temple University.
