= Navajo Family Sign =

Deaf sign language of the Navajo people

- Native to: United States
- Ethnicity: Navajo
- Language family: Language isolate

Language codes
- ISO 639-3: –

- People: Diné
- Language: Diné Bizaad, Diné Yideez, Hak'éí Yideez
- Country: Dinétah

Navajo Family Sign is a sign language used by a small deaf community of the Navajo People.
