= Concho (ornament) =

Ornament found in Native American art

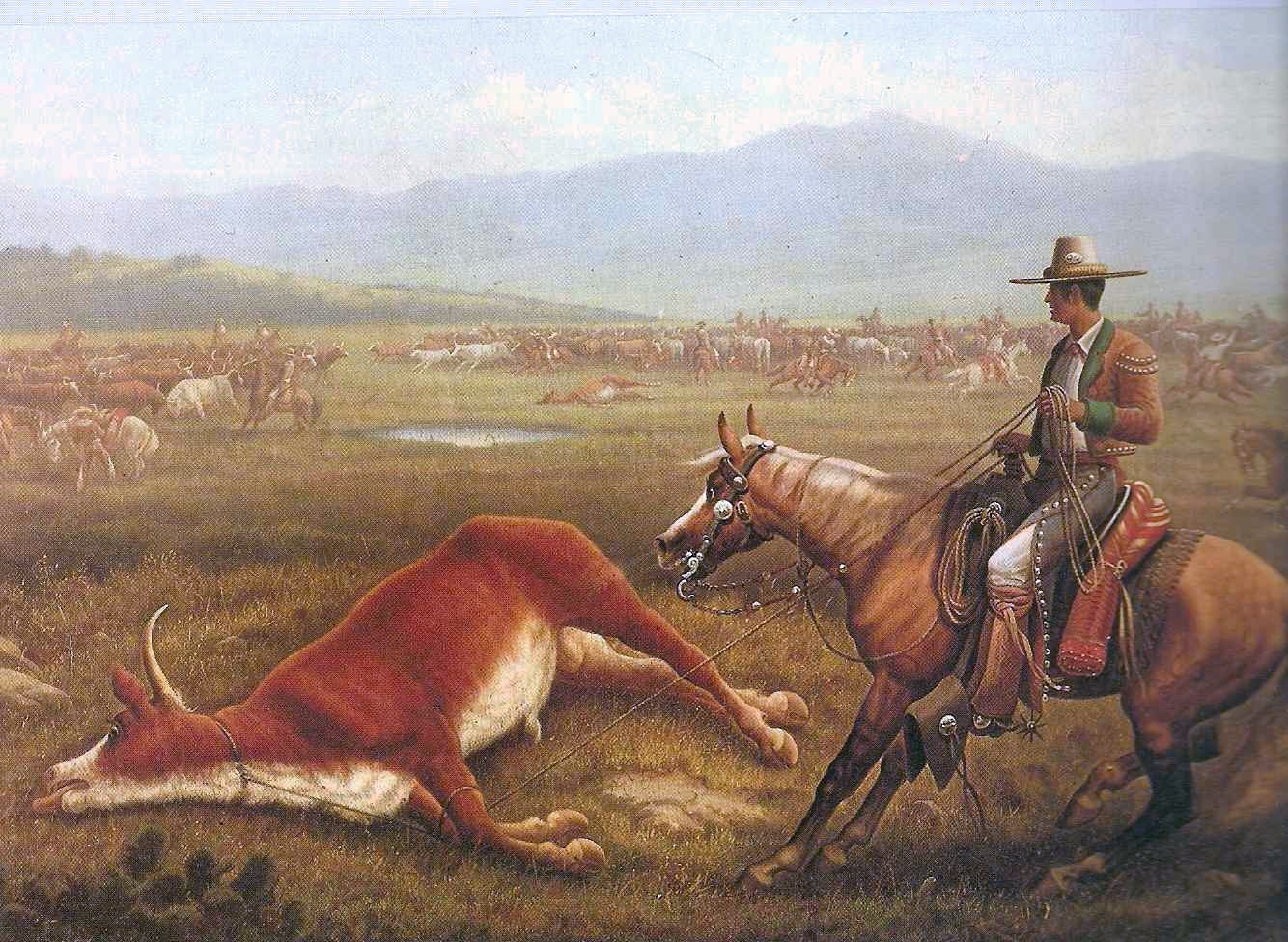
An 1877 illustration of a vaquero in Mexican California in the 1830s. Conchos decorate the horse's bridle and the vaquero's hat.

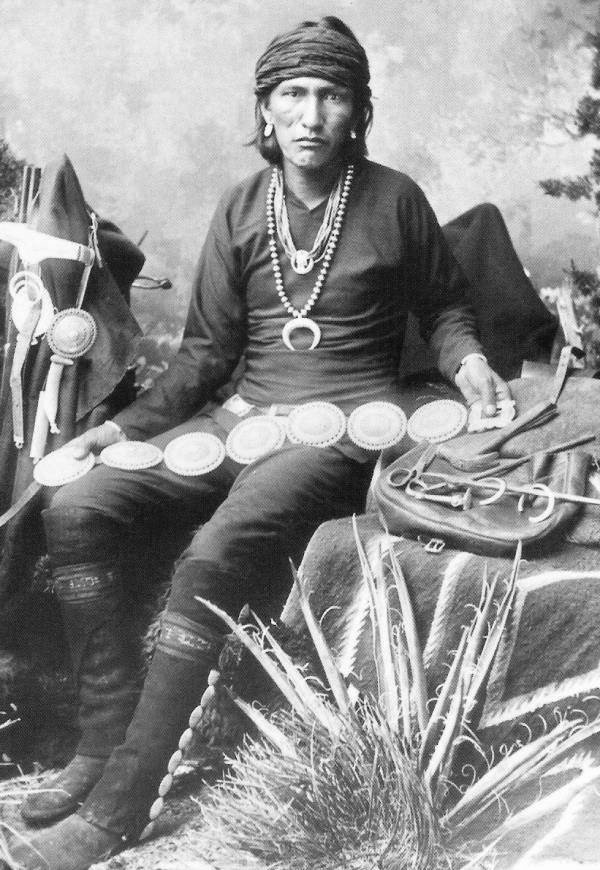
Navajo silversmith Atsidi Sani displaying a concho belt in 1881

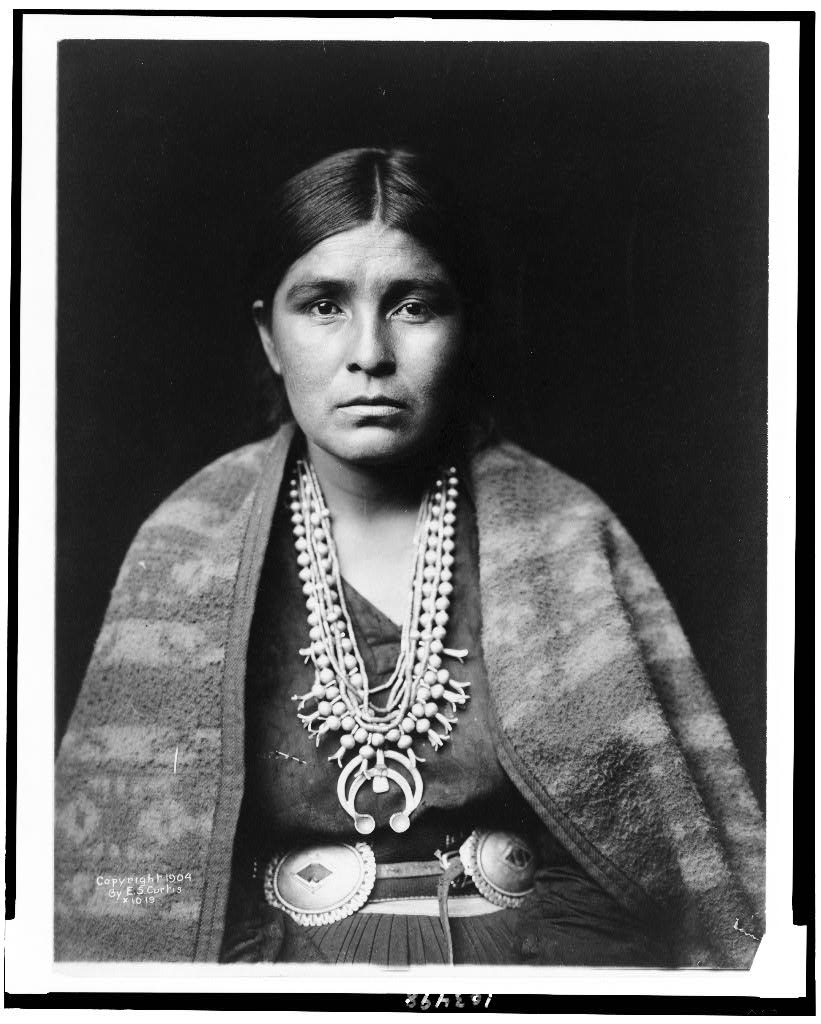
A Navajo woman wearing a squash blossom necklace and a concho belt, ca. 1904

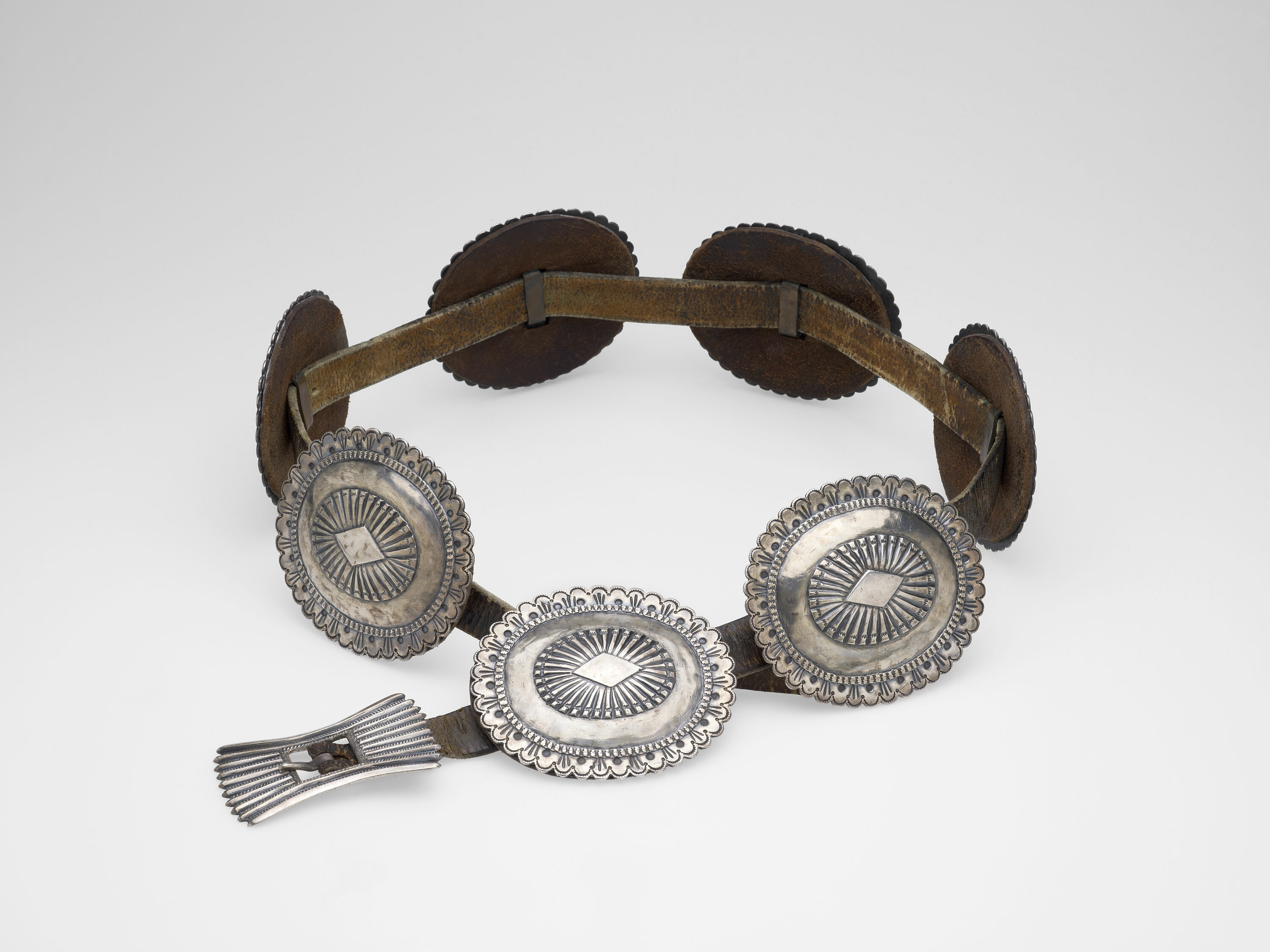
Navajo (Diné). Concho Belt, 1880s. The Art Institute of Chicago.

A concho or concha is a typically oval silver ornament found in Native American art and later in Western wear. Conchos are most closely associated with the Navajo people, with one of the best known forms being the concho belt. Concho hat bands are also common.

Conchos were first made by eastern tribes such as the Delaware and Shawnee, whose craftsmen learned their trade from European artisans. Following their resettlement in Oklahoma in the 1830s, they passed the art form on to Plains tribes including the Comanche, Kiowa and Ute, who in turn introduced it to the Navajo of the Southwest. The Navajo later began making conchos around the 1870s to 1880s, after they had learned the craft of silversmithing from Rio Grande Mexican peoples. The form was derived, at least in part, from Spanish horse bridle decorations. The name concho comes from concha, the Spanish word for 'seashell'.

Concho accessories were later popularized by the fashion industry, rock and roll performers and movie stars.

== Fashion and popular culture ==
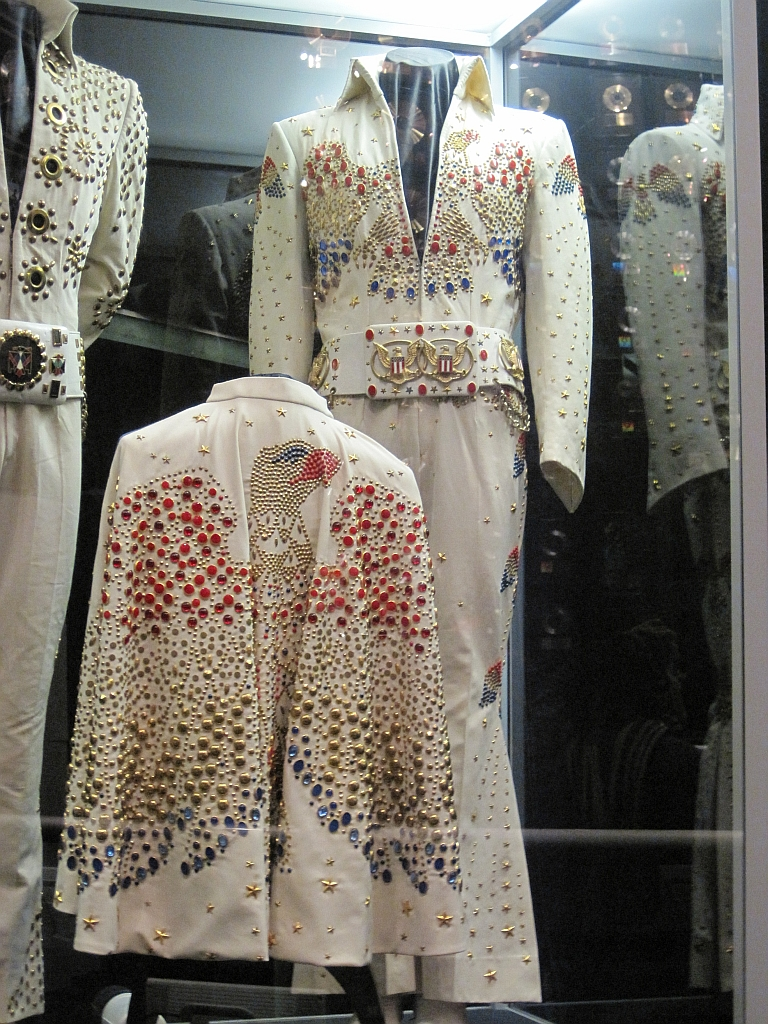
Elvis Presley embellished some of his jumpsuits with conchos in the 1970s

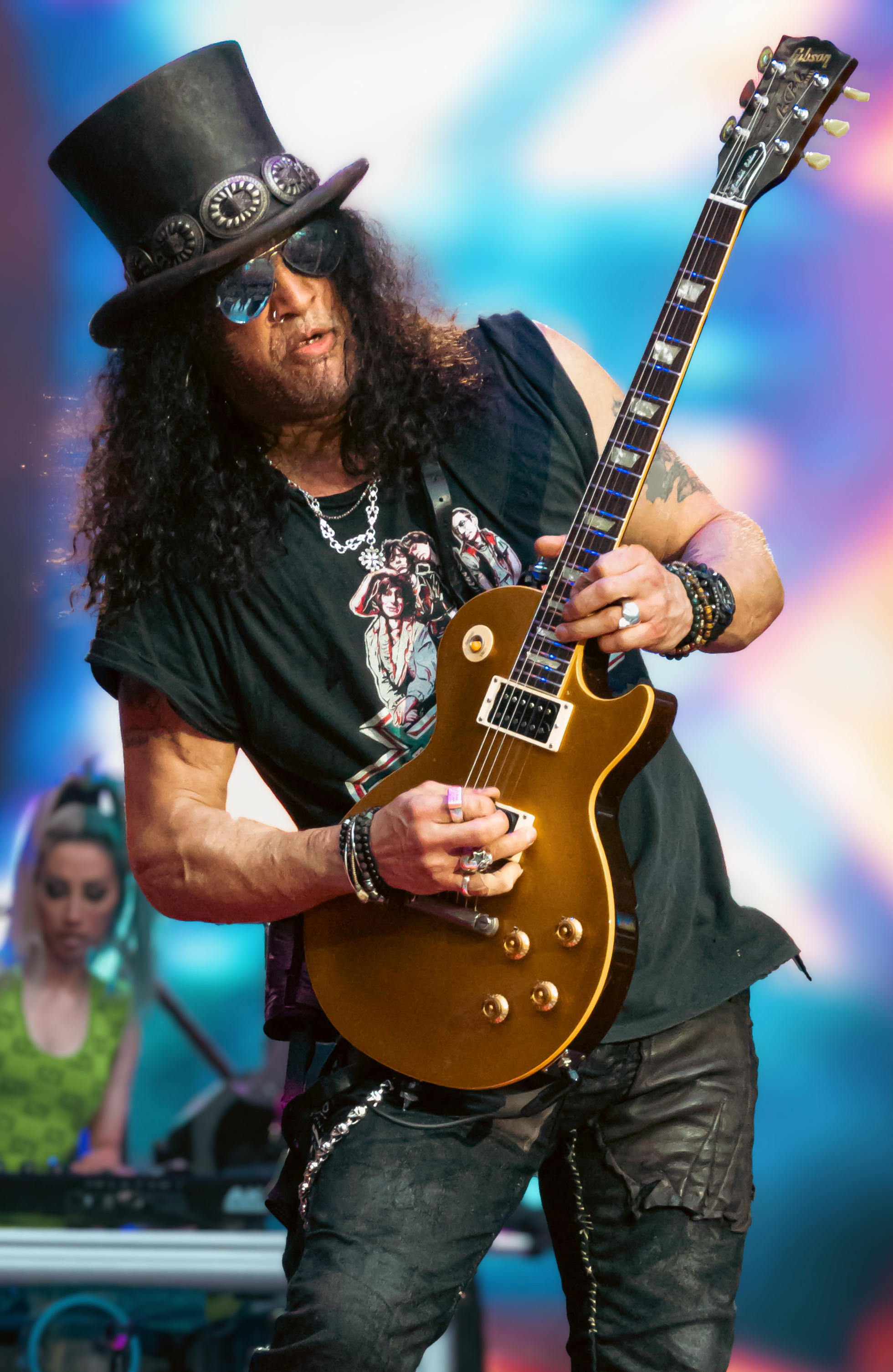
Slash wearing his trademark top hat with concho hat band in 2022

In the 19th and early 20th century, American Western wear evolved from the clothing typical of Mexican vaquero (cowboy) culture, and "silver concho medallions" were one of many common clothing accessories that contributed to that look. In 1947, heiress and fashion icon Millicent Rogers relocated to Taos, New Mexico where she adopted a personal style based on the clothing and the jewelry of the Navajo and the Pueblo peoples, including concho belts. Her distinctive look came to the attention of influential fashion journalist Diana Vreeland, who featured Rogers wearing concho belts in Harper's Bazaar magazine, which created great interest among fashion conscious people. In the 21st century, decades after Vreeland and Rogers legitimized concho accessories as fashionable, companies like Ralph Lauren and Calvin Klein continue to promote the concho look.

== Rock and roll ==
About twenty years after Vreeland and Rogers publicized concho accessories, prominent rock and roll performers began wearing concho belts and hat bands on stage. Among them were Jim Morrison,Jimi Hendrix, Janis Joplin, Cher and Elvis Presley. Concho hatbands have helped define the iconic visual images of rock performers such as Stevie Ray Vaughan and Slash.

== Movies ==
Warren Beatty wore a concho belt in the 1975 movie Shampoo. Clint Eastwood wore a Stetson hat with a concho hatband in the 1980 film Bronco Billy.
