= The Navajo Boy =

- Directed by: Robert J. Kennedy
- Produced by: Bill Kennedy
- Starring: Happy Cly; Willie Cly; Jimmy Cly
- Release date: 1950
- Country: United States
- Language: Silent (original film)

The Navajo Boy was a 1950 silent film that portrayed the Cly family on the Navajo Nation in Monument Valley, Utah. The director, Robert J. Kennedy, narrated the film live at each showing. In addition, he provided little written information about the context or the identities of the Navajo people featured in the film. (The original spelling of the film is The Navaho Boy, as was customary at the time.)

He featured Happy and Willie Cly. Happy Cly is considered to be the most photographed Native American person in the United States. Their nephew Jimmy Cly was the "Navajo Boy" for whom the original film was named.

At the turn of the twenty-first century, the director's son Bill Kennedy, a film producer, decided he wanted to revisit the Cly family for a documentary about their lives. But he wanted to involve them and the Navajo people in the production and let them speak for themselves. He produced the documentary, The Return of Navajo Boy (2000). The Navajo believed the earlier film had treated them as voiceless stereotypes, and they wanted to express their own story. They especially wanted to tell of the health damage and deaths in countless families due to the uranium mining on the reservation, which was unregulated for decades.
