= Many Farms Community School =

Navajo tribal school in Arizona

Location
- 2600 Lakeview Drive, Many Farms; Navajo Nation; 36.3659°N 109.6281°W

Information
- Established: 1965
- Governed by: Navajo Nation Council, Central Navajo Education Line Office, Bureau of Indian Education
- Staff: 6
- Faculty: 23
- Grades: K–8
- Enrollment: 246
- Website: mfcs.bie.edu

Many Farms Community School, Inc. (MFCS), is a tribally controlled K-8 school in Many Farms, Arizona, operated by the Navajo Nation. It is funded by the Bureau of Indian Education (BIE). MFCS has a boarding program to serve students who live at a distance from this community.

The institution was founded in 1910 as the Chinle Boarding School and operated by the Bureau of Indian Affairs in Chinle, Arizona for more than six decades, until 1976. When a new, larger school complex was built in 1960 in Chinle, it was described as one of the largest on the Navajo Nation.

The Chinle School was relocated to Many Farms, Arizona in 1976, where it took over a former elementary boarding school. By that year, the Navajo Nation had contracted with the BIA to manage the school. It started with a larger enrollment in the fall because of changes at another school. The official organizational names were formerly Chinle Boarding School, Inc. and Many Farms Day School, Inc. By 2012 the Navajo Nation had renamed the K-8 school as the Many Farms Community School.

The K-8 school is co-located on an educational campus with Many Farms High School, which is still directly operated by the BIE. Before Diné College moved to Tsaile, it was also situated at the Many Farms BIE-school complex.

== History ==
This school is a successor to the Chinle Boarding School, established in 1910 in Chinle by the Bureau of Indian Affairs (BIA) under authorizing legislation by Congress. With construction of the BIA school in Chinle, the federal government "established a permanent presence in [Chinle]" and the agency "effectively governed the town thereafter." The school has enrolled Navajo (Diné) students in grades K-8. In 1956 the school had 249 students.

Circa 1960 the BIE was building a new $3,100,000, 34-classroom boarding school at Chinle. Described as "one of the largest schools on the Navajo Nation", it had boarding facilities for 256-person dormitories, two each for both boys and girls. Facilities included a 300-student dining room, library, and science and home economics labs. In addition, 114 units of employee housing were constructed, and the complex included its own power and sewer plants. Based on student population in the sub-agency area and estimates of growth, the BIE anticipated 1,024 students would initially enroll and that the school would eventually house 2,000 students.

Notable alumni include painter Robert Draper (Navajo and Hopi/Laguna).

== BIA curriculum and instruction, and changes from 1965 to 1973 ==
Galena Dick, an alumna, wrote in her memoir that in the 1950s the Chinle school forbade her from using the Navajo language. Its mission was to assimilate the children into European-American culture and teach them English. According to Dick's memoir, Navajo matrons assisted in enforcing this policy.

In the 1960s Native American activists increased their demands for their cultures to be recognized and to gain more authority over their children's education. The Chinle and other BIA schools slowly began to reflect such demands for curriculum that recognized the cultures of the Navajo and other Native American nations. In 1965 the BIA staff began teaching students about the Navajo tribal government, in addition to that of the United States. The school board asked that a curriculum unit also be taught about the traditional Hopi family. Circa 1971 Chinle began using a non-graded curriculum that emphasized more individualized instruction of students.

In 1972 the teachers began using storytelling techniques in its curriculum, which are a tradition in Navajo culture. By 1973 the curriculum in BIA schools included "Indian Studies".

In 1974 Chinle had 26 classrooms in use, and had 730 students. About 80% of the classrooms had Navajo aides who worked with the children on their Navajo language skills. The idea was that improving their skills in Navajo would also help them develop better skills in English. That year students came from areas ranging from Black Rock, New Mexico, Forest Lake, Arizona, and points in between.

== New public school uses for Chinle buildings ==
After the 1976 move of the Chinle Boarding School to Many Farms, the Chinle Agency of the BIA and Chinle Unified School District (USD) #24 took over the former buildings for their use.

The Chinle USD was established in 1958. It is governed by a five-member school board elected from the district in the Navajo Nation. All current members are Navajo. They adapted one of the buildings on the campus to use as a warehouse. The Chinle Elementary, Chinle Junior High, and Chinle High School are all located in Chinle, as part of its USD #24.

== Relocation of Chinle Boarding School ==
In the school's final year in Chinle ending in spring 1976, its enrollment was 750 students. That year the school was relocated to a former elementary school facility in Many Farms, Arizona. Initially it was still called Chinle School.

Chinle Boarding School took over the former Many Farms Elementary School, which had also operated as a boarding school. Chinle School opened at that location with an enrollment of 860 and 170 employees. The campus had six dormitories, but initially there were sufficient students to use only four whole dormitories and half of the fifth. The school adapted the sixth for recreation facilities. The Chinle school had received extra students that year after the 7th grade was discontinued at the Lukachukai School. The distribution of the school's students from Navajo communities remained the same. By 2012 the Navajo Nation changed the name of the tribally controlled K-8 school to Many Farms Community School.

== Expansion and programs ==
The Navajo Nation has made substantial improvements to Chinle/Many Farms Community School, undertaking a major 33,000-square-foot (3,100 m^{2}) expansion that was constructed from May 2003 to December 2004. It added two new three-story dormitories, each containing 26 separate rooms (52 rooms total, with semi-private and private bathrooms). In addition, parking lots, recreational areas, and basketball courts were constructed. Community and service area were part of the project, including administrative and office areas, a media center, and a billiard room, and student lounge areas. Construction was completed by Stronghold Engineering, Inc. of Perris, California. Challenging conditions included extremely high winds and low winter temperatures typical of the community.

In the 21st century, MFCS holds an annual arts and crafts show.

== Campus ==
Jacqueline Benally, the executive director, recalled that Many Farms facilities were in a poor condition when she arrived circa 2012. Benally in 2015 stated that the electrical systems were inadequate for supporting the technology used by the school.

Students living in dormitories often do so because their houses lack services and/or their family situations are not stable. The school is one of several on-reservation boarding schools.

The school has 44 units of teacher housing. By 2015 their condition had deteriorated so Benally used rent collected from in-housing teachers to try to restore the buildings.
