= Chinle (disambiguation) =

Chinle is a census-designated place in Arizona on the Navajo Nation.

Chinle may also refer to:

- Chinle Formation, a geologic formation in the southwestern United States
- Chinle Valley, a valley of the Navajo Nation, in northeast Arizona and southeast Utah
