= Round rock =

Round Rock is a city in central Texas in the United States

Round rock or Round Rock may also refer to:

- a rock that is round in shape
- Round Rock (Apache County, Arizona), a mesa on Navajo Nation
- Round Rock, Arizona, a census-designated place in Apache County, Arizona in the United States
- Round Rock, an uninhabited island in the British Virgin Islands
- Round Rock Express, a minor league baseball franchise based in Round Rock, Texas
- Weaubleau-Osceola structure, an impact crater in western Missouri, and the site of geological formations known locally as "round rocks" or "Missouri rock balls"
- Round Rock, Palau, a bar in Palau
