= Chinle Valley =

Valley in Apache County, Arizona, US

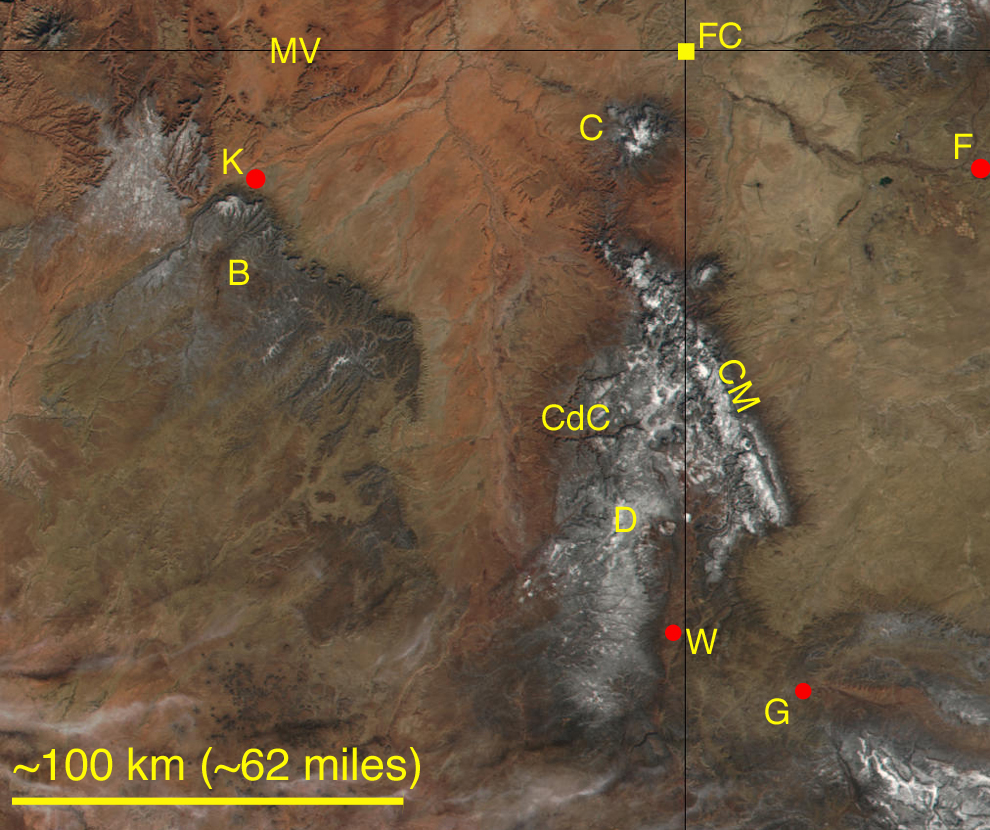
- Chinle Valley, between Black Mesa west, and the mountain ranges to the east & southeast

- Location within Arizona
- Length: 65 mi (105 km) N-S

Geography
- Country: United States
- States: Arizona; Utah
- Region: Colorado Plateau
- Counties: Apache County, AZ; San Juan County, UT
- Communities: List: Rock Point, AZ; Round Rock, AZ; Many Farms, AZ; Chinle, AZ; Mexican Water, AZ; (Bluff, UT)
- Borders on: List: Black Mesa; Monument Valley; Carrizo Mountains; Lukachukai Mountains; Chuska Mountains; Canyon de Chelly; Defiance Plateau
- Coordinates: 36°39′30″N 109°40′06″W
- Rivers: Chinle Creek; Chinle Wash
- Lake: Many Farms Lake
- Interactive map of Chinle Valley

Chinle Valley is a 65-mile (105 km) long valley located mostly in Apache County Arizona. Chinle Creek continues north into Utah to meet the San Juan River (Utah).

Chinle Valley is defined by the course of Chinle Wash, with the region as part of the high elevation Colorado Plateau. Numerous washes and creeks feed the Chinle Wash, because the valley lies among higher elevation regions; the Black Mesa borders its west and southwest, the Carrizo, Lukachukai, and Chuska Mountains border east and southeast. The south valley region is part of the northwest of the Defiance Plateau-(Defiace Uplift), and is the location ol Canyon de Chelly National Monument.

Chinle Valley is one of the locations for the Chinle Formation, (no type locality), of Arizona, Utah, New Mexico, Colorado, and west Texas.

Monument Valley, of Arizona and Utah, is at the northwest border of Chinle Valley.

== Description ==
Chinle Valley is mostly a north-south trending valley, about 65-mi long. The valley contains numerous smaller mesas, and associated washes, that all trend into the centerline of the north-flowing Chinle Creek, (Chinle Wash).

The low point of the valley is in the north, where Chinle Creek continues north to meet the San Juan River in Utah, about 16-mi distant from Mexican Water, Arizona.

=== Creeks & lakes ===
Two lakes are found in Chinle Valley. Many Farms Lake is located on Sheep Dip Creek at Many Farms, Arizona, about 1.5-mi from the Chinle Wash. Just northeast, and 3-mi southeast of Round Rock, Arizona is Round Rock Reservoir, located on Navajo Route 12, and between Lukachukai Creek (from the Lukachukai Mountains, 7-mi east), and Agua Sal Creek, from the northwest Chuska Mountains (the small Tunitcha Mountains area).

== Access ==
The main access route through Chinle Valley is the north-south traversing of U.S. Route 191 (US 191).

For Arizona, Chinle, Arizona is located adjacent the valley's southern terminus, and is also the location of the outflow of Chinle Wash from Canyon de Chelly. Just north on US 191 lies Many Farms, Arizona, where Navajo Route 59 terminates. Route 59 comes from the northwest, east of Kayenta, and follows the northeast flank of the Black Mesa.

Round Rock, Arizona is just north on US 191, but easterly on a site neighboring Lukachukai Creek, (and east of Agua Sal Creek), both southeast tributaries to Chinle Wash. Continuing north, Rock Point, Arizona (just northeast of Plane Rock, 5,621 feet (1,713 m)), is near the Chinle Valley center, and on Chinle Wash; three routes converge in the Rock Point region, Navajo Route 35 (and Route 5040) are east, Navajo Route 8070 comes from the southwest, from the region of Trading Post Wash, and the north of Carson Mesa, (a section of the southwest of Chinle Valley), and Navajo Route 18, from US 160 to the northwest.

The north terminus region of Chinle Valley is the site of Mexican Water, Arizona; it lies between US 191 on the Utah–Arizona state line, and US 160 adjacent south. US 160 traverses east-west through the north terminus region of Chinle Valley. In the west, the route turns southwesterly and follows Laguna Creek which parallels a due-southwest trending section of Comb Ridge, of both northeast Arizona and southeast Utah.

In Utah, US 191 leaves the north terminus area of Chinle Valley (Mexican Water region), and follows the Chinle Creek course at its east (Nokaito Bench), and intersects US 163, near Bluff.
