= Diné College =

Tribal college on the Navajo Nation

Coordinates: 36.32038°N 109.23088°W

- Former names: Navajo Community College (1968–1997)
- Motto: The Higher Education Institution of the Navajo
- Type: Public tribal land-grant college
- Established: 1968; 58 years ago (opened January 20, 1969)
- Academic affiliations: Space-grant
- Students: 2,000
- Location: Tsaile, Arizona, United States
- Colors: blue and gold
- Mascot: Warriors
- Website: www.dinecollege.edu

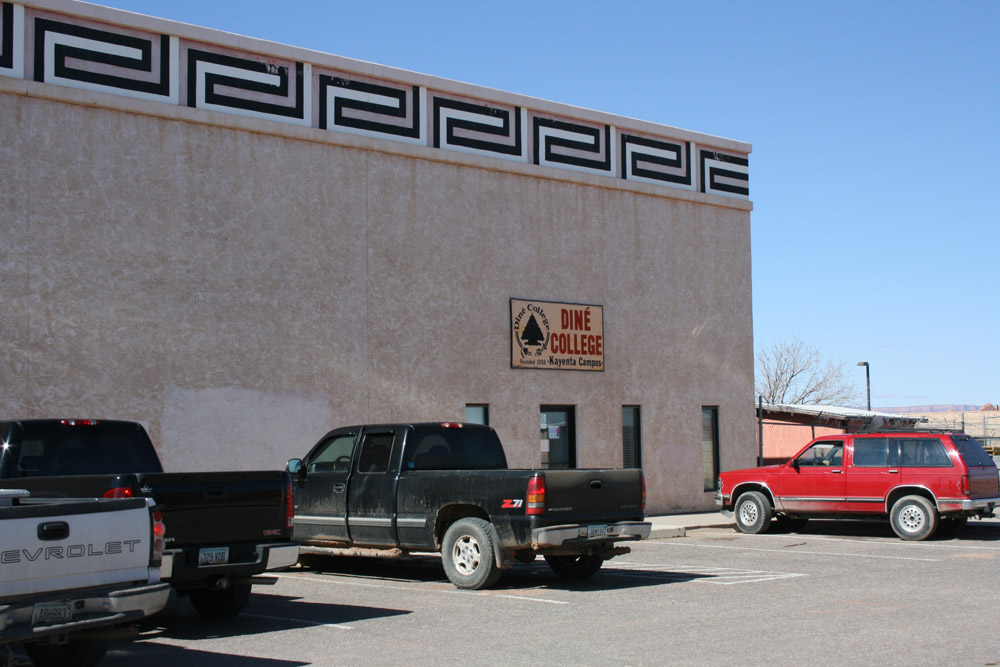
Kayenta Campus

Diné College is a public tribal land-grant college based in Tsaile, Arizona, serving the 27,000-square-mile (70,000 km^{2}) Navajo Nation. It offers associate degrees, bachelor's degrees, academic certificates, and one master's degree.

== History ==
Diné College opened in 1968 as the Navajo Community College, the first college established by Native Americans for Native Americans. The college was chartered by the Navajo Nation in 1968. The Navajo Tribal Council appointed Guy Gorman, Yazzie Begay, Chester Yellowhair, Carl Todacheene, Wilson Skeet, Howard Gorman, Allen Yazzie, and Dillon Platero to be the first to serve on the college's Board of Regents. Robert Roessel served as the college's first president.

The college was originally located at the site of the Rough Rock Community School in Rough Rock on a temporary basis until a permanent site could be chosen and constructed. The Board of Regents selected three possible sites for the college, namely the Tsaile–Wheatfields area, Many Farms, and Ganado. After a Board-commissioned survey of possible sites for the college, the Tsaile–Wheatfields area was recommended because it had plenty of water available and has scenic forests and lakes. After the Board was guaranteed 1,000 acres for the campus, a residential area, and a shopping area, the Board officially chose the Tsaile–Wheatfields area in October 1968. The Board asked people to send in designs for the college's seal, and it chose the William Morgan's design of an arrowhead encircled by a rainbow god.

On January 20, 1968, the college officially opened with 40 faculty members. There were 340 students enrolled during its first semester, which was the limit of its capacity. More than 3,000 other applicants were turned away due to a lack of space. The college added 23 evening classes because there was a higher demand for evening classes than daytime classes.

By 1973, 3,421 students had enrolled at Navaho Community College, but only 46 had graduated with associate degrees during that time. There was little for the students to do outside of classes, and excessive drinking became a problem for some.

In October 1973, following construction delays, students began taking classes at the college's permanent campus in Tsaile. The campus was officially dedicated on May 14, 1974. Most campus buildings were built in octagonal shapes, similar to the eight-sided traditional Navajo hogan. The campus cost $12 million to build. Some classes were taught in Shiprock and Fort Defiance.

In August 1992, Tommy Lewis became president. During his tenure, the college's funding from the Bureau of Indian Affairs increased to almost $7.3 million in 2000. The Navajo Language and Culture Curriculum became widely popular at the Tsaile campus after the program saw increases in class enrollment, thus allowing the Board of Regents to implement the program throughout the institution. In 1994, the college was designated a land-grant college alongside 31 other tribal colleges.

In 1997, the administration changed the name of the school from Navajo Community College to Diné College in order to better to represent its function as an institution of learning for the Diné/Navajo people.

In 1998, Diné College bestowed its first bachelor's degrees under the Diné Teacher Education Program, accredited through a partnership with Arizona State University.

In 1998, the Diné College Library was rededicated as the Kinyaa'áanii Charlie Benally Memorial Library.

On May 21, 2011, the women's archery team made history by winning the United States college national championship in compound bow. This is believed to be the first time a tribal college team has won a top-tier intercollegiate national championship event in any sport.

In 2019, the Chicago-based Higher Learning Commission (HLC) approved Diné College’s four-year institution status and two additional emphasis options within the BA of Fine Arts degree: silversmithing and weaving.

== Academics ==
Diné College offers bachelor's degrees, associate degrees,certificate programs, and one master's degree.

The college's Center for Diné Studies "applies Navajo Są́ʼąh Naagháí Bikʼeh Hózhóón principles to advance quality student learning through Nitsáhákees (Thinking), Nahatʼá (Planning), Iiná (Living) and Siihasin (Assurance) in study of the Navajo language, history, and culture in preparation for further studies and employment in a multi-cultural and technological world."

The college also hosts the Uranium Education Program on its Shiprock campus. It is an empowerment program for the Navajo centering on the study of radiation and environmental health issues arising from the aftermath of uranium mining/milling operations on the Navajo Nation, as well as other serious environmental issues.

== Campuses ==
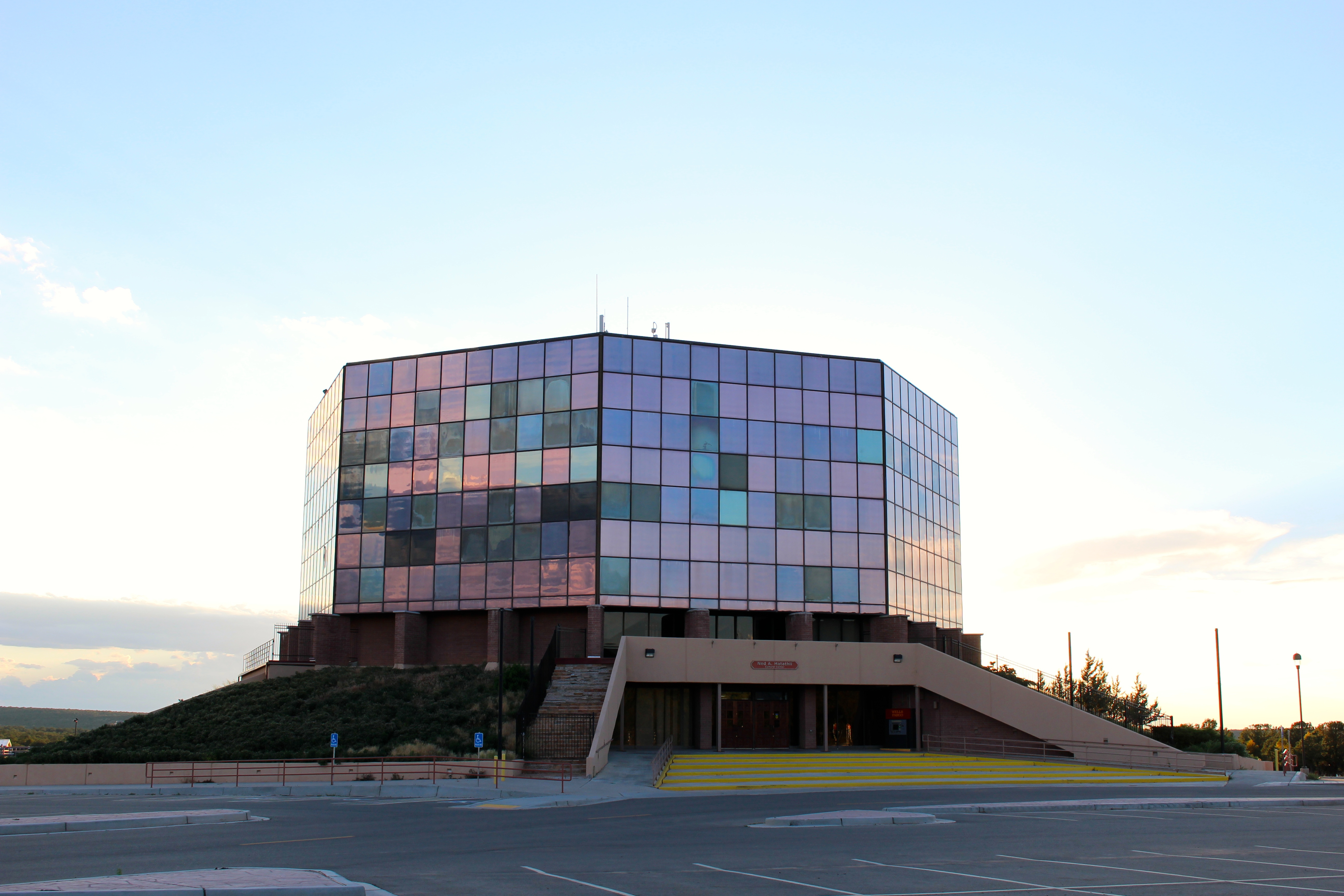
The Ned A. Hataałi Center at Diné College's Tsaile campus

The main campus of Diné College is in Tsaile, a census-designated place in unincorporated Apache County, Arizona. There are also five branches of Diné College: two in Apache County, Arizona (Chinle and Window Rock), one in Coconino County, Arizona (Tuba City), one in McKinley County, New Mexico (Crownpoint) and one in San Juan County, New Mexico (Shiprock). Diné College also has two micro-sites in Aneth, Utah, and Newcomb, New Mexico.

The main Tsaile campus includes eight fifteen-room dormitories housing about 150 students: each octagonally shaped unit has a fireplace in the center, and is described by the college as a "hooghan away from hogan"—a reference to the traditional Navajo hogan dwelling.

Hogan Faculty Housing is also on campus. Residents of family housing and faculty housing are zoned to the Chinle Unified School District. Tsaile Elementary School is in proximity to the university. All Chinle USD residents are assigned to Chinle High School.

== Governance ==
The college is directed by an eight-member Board of Regents confirmed by the Government Services committee of the Navajo Nation Council. The name Diné comes from the traditional name for the Navajo, meaning "the people."

== Student life ==
Undergraduate demographics as of Fall 2023
Race and ethnicity	Total
American Indian/Alaska Native	99%
Other	1%
Economic diversity
Low-income (Note: The percentage of students who received an income-based federal Pell grant intended for low-income students.)	46%
Affluent (Note: The percentage of students who are a part of the American middle class at the bare minimum.)	54%

== Alumni ==
- Carmelita Little Turtle, Apache/Rarámuri photographer
- Nicco Montaño, professional Mixed Martial Artist, inaugural UFC Women's Flyweight Champion, first UFC Champion of Navajo descent
- Moli Yeski Yusef, Chadian Olympic runner

== See also ==
- Diné College Press
