= Many Farms High School =

Location
- Loop Drive, Lakeview Road, Hwy. 191; Many Farms, Arizona 86538; United States; 36°22′22″N 109°37′31″W

Information
- School type: Boarding high school
- Established: 1969 (57 years ago)
- Educational authority: Bureau of Indian Education
- CEEB code: 030198
- Principal: Louise Donald
- Staff: 22.50 (FTE)
- Grades: 9–12
- Enrollment: 303 (2023–2024)
- Student to teacher ratio: 13.47
- Colors: Cardinal, silver and black
- Mascot: Lobos
- Website: mfh.bie.edu

Many Farms High School library

Many Farms High School (MFHS) is a boarding school operated by the US Department of the Interior Bureau of Indian Education, in the heart of the Navajo reservation in Many Farms, Arizona, 15 miles (24 km) northeast of Canyon De Chelly National Monument. It has 445 (yearly average) students and 35 faculty members along with a large support staff. It has separate dormitories for male and female students. It opened in 1969.

== Campus ==
It is co-located with the Many Farms Community School (formerly Chinle Boarding School), a K–8 boarding school. Before Diné College moved to Tsaile, it was situated on the Many Farms BIE school complex.

In 1991 there were problems with maintenance and upkeep in the dormitory for male students.

== Athletics and activities ==
The sports team is the "Lobos" ("wolves" in Spanish). It participates in American football, cross-country, volleyball, basketball, wrestling, baseball, softball and track and field, and is part of the Arizona Interscholastic Association. The school also has several clubs within the academic setting.
