= Del Muerto, Arizona =

CDP in Apache County, Arizona

- Census-designated place
- Location within Arizona
- Coordinates: 36°11′15″N 109°26′09″W
- Country: United States
- State: Arizona
- County: Apache

Area
  - Total: 1.19 sq mi (3.08 km^{2})
  - Land: 1.19 sq mi (3.08 km^{2})
  - Water: 0 sq mi (0.00 km^{2})
- Elevation: 6,477 ft (1,974 m)

Population (2020)
  - Total: 258
  - Density: 216.9/sq mi (83.76/km^{2})
- Time zone: UTC-7 (MST)
  - Summer (DST): UTC-6 (MDT)
- ZIP code: 86503
- Area code: 928
- FIPS code: 04-18490
- GNIS feature ID: 2582771

Del Muerto is a census-designated place (CDP) in Apache County, Arizona, United States. The population was 329 at the 2010 census.

== Geography ==
Del Muerto is located about 9 miles (14 km) east of Chinle. It lies within 2 miles (3 km) of the north rim of Canyon del Muerto, a branch of Canyon de Chelly.

According to the United States Census Bureau, the CDP has a total area of 1.0 square mile (2.6 km^{2}), all land.

== Education ==
The community is within the Chinle Unified School District, which operates Chinle High School.

== Demographics ==
Historical population
Census	Pop.	Note	%±
2020	258		—
U.S. Decennial Census
