= Agua Sal Creek =

Waterway in Apache County, Arizona

Coordinates: 36°27′40″N 109°28′42″W

Location
- Country: United States
- State: Arizona

Physical characteristics
- Mouth
  - elevation: 5,397 ft (1,645 m)

Agua Sal Creek is a stream located in the Chinle Valley of Apache County, Arizona.

"Agua Sal" is a name derived from Spanish meaning "salt water".
