= Sehili, Arizona =

CDP in Apache County, Arizona

- Census-designated place
- Location within Arizona
- Coordinates: 36°16′51″N 109°10′53″W
- Country: United States
- State: Arizona
- County: Apache

Area
  - Total: 0.65 sq mi (1.69 km^{2})
  - Land: 0.65 sq mi (1.69 km^{2})
  - Water: 0 sq mi (0.00 km^{2})
- Elevation: 7,166 ft (2,184 m)

Population (2020)
  - Total: 153
  - Density: 234.7/sq mi (90.63/km^{2})
- Time zone: UTC-7 (MST)
- FIPS code: 04-65400
- GNIS feature ID: 2582864

Sehili is a census-designated place (CDP) in Apache County, Arizona, United States. The population was 135 at the 2010 census.

== Geography ==
Sehili is located directly east of the Tsaile CDP.

According to the United States Census Bureau, the CDP has a total area of 0.66 square miles (1.7 km^{2}), all land.

== Education ==
The census-designated place is within the Chinle Unified School District, which operates Chinle High School.

== Demographics ==
Historical population
Census	Pop.	Note	%±
2010	135		—
2020	153		13.3%
U.S. Decennial Census
