= Round Rock (Apache County, Arizona) =

Mountain in Arizona, United States

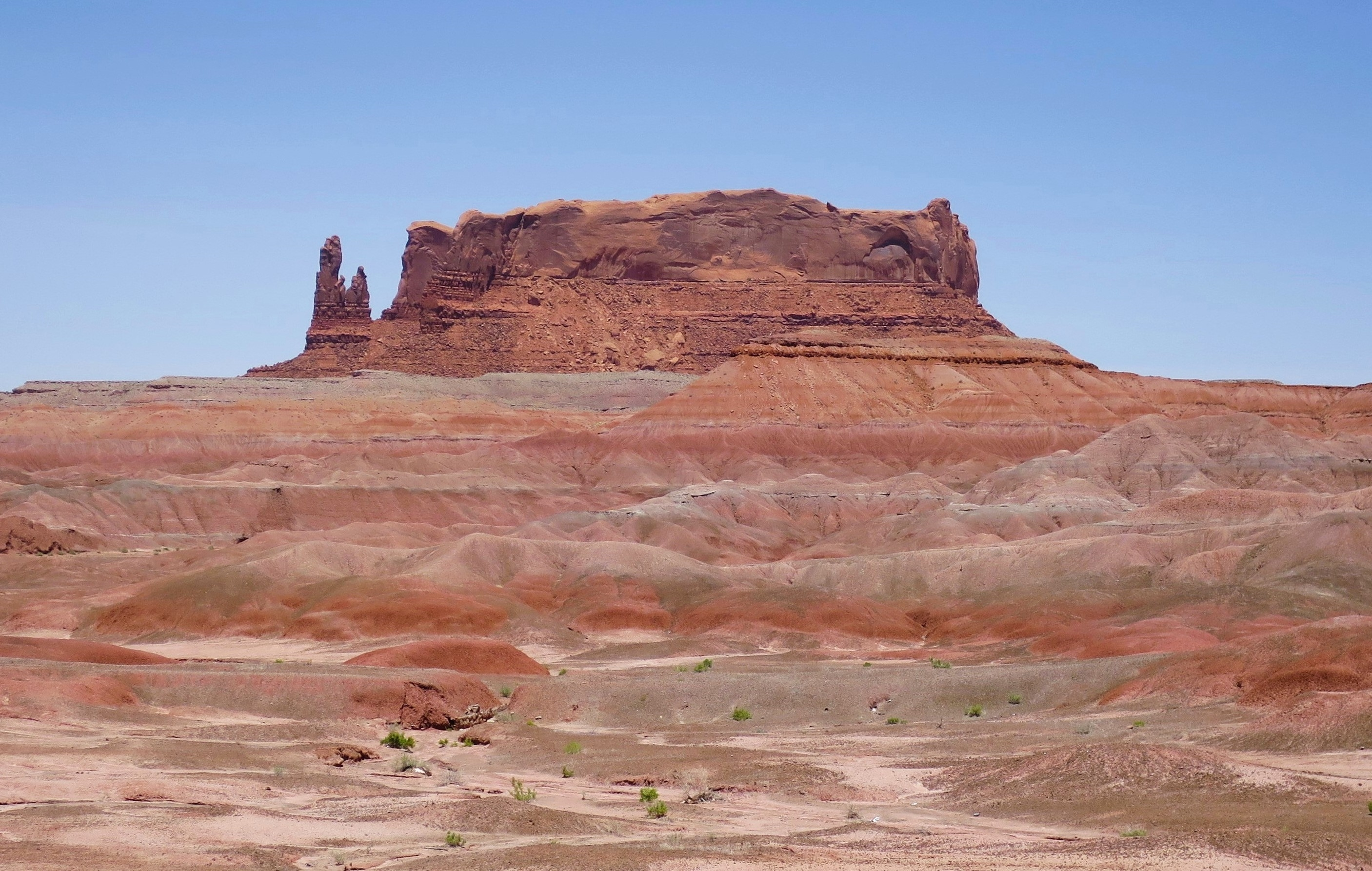
- South aspect

Highest point
- Elevation: 6,310 ft (1,923 m)
- Prominence: 920 ft (280 m)
- Parent peak: Matthews Peak (9,550 ft)
- Isolation: 10.59 mi (17.04 km)
- Coordinates: 36°29′53″N 109°33′17″W

Naming
- Native name: Tsé Nikání (Navajo)

Geography
- Location within Arizona Location within the United States
- Location: Navajo Reservation; Apache County, Arizona, U.S.
- Parent range: Colorado Plateau
- Topo map: USGS Many Farms NE

Geology
- Rock age: Late Triassic
- Mountain type: Mesa
- Rock type: Wingate Sandstone

Climbing
- Easiest route: class 5.x climbing

Round Rock is a 6,310-foot-elevation (1,923-meter) summit in Apache County, Arizona, United States.

== Description ==
Round Rock is located 4.5 miles (7.2 km) west of the community of Round Rock on Navajo Nation land, and can be seen from Highway 191. Round Rock is a mesa composed of cliff-forming Triassic Wingate Sandstone overlaying slope-forming Chinle Formation. Little Round Rock is a 6,113-foot-elevation (1,863-meter) butte less than two miles to the north. Precipitation runoff from this irregularly-shaped mesa's slopes drains into Agua Sal Wash and Chinle Wash which are part of the San Juan River drainage basin. Topographic relief is significant as the summit rises 700 feet (213 meters) above the surrounding terrain of Chinle Valley in one-quarter mile (0.4 km). The nearest higher neighbor is Los Gigantes Buttes, 10.5 miles (16.9 km) to the northeast. The landform's toponym was officially adopted on April 7, 1915, by the U.S. Board on Geographic Names. The Navajo call the mesa Tsé Nikání which means round flat-topped rock. According to legend, the Navajo used Round Rock as a fortress to escape from foes, by climbing it with braided ropes made out of yucca, then hauled the ropes up to leave their enemies behind. However, a different story claims that Navajos do not climb the sacred rock out of fear of punishment from lightning, snakes, bears, or whirlwinds.

== Climate ==
Spring and fall are the most favorable seasons to visit Round Rock. According to the Köppen climate classification system, it is located in a semi-arid climate zone with cold winters and hot summers. Summers average 54 days above 90 °F (32 °C) annually, and highs rarely exceed 100 °F (38 °C). Summer nights are comfortably cool, and temperatures drop quickly after sunset. Winters are cold, but daytime highs are usually above freezing. Winter temperatures below 0 °F (−18 °C) are uncommon, though possible. This desert climate receives less than 10 inches (250 millimeters) of annual rainfall, and snowfall is generally light during the winter.
