= Vernon School District =

Vernon School District may refer to:

- School District 22 Vernon (British Columbia, Canada)
- Vernon Elementary School District (Arizona, United States)
- Vernon Township School District (New Jersey, United States)
