= Cottonwood, Apache County, Arizona =

CDP in Apache County, Arizona

Cottonwood, Arizona
- Census-designated place
- Location within Arizona
- Coordinates: 36°43′38″N 112°01′30″W
- Country: United States
- State: Arizona
- County: Apache

Area
  - Total: 0.16 sq mi (0.41 km^{2})
  - Land: 0.16 sq mi (0.41 km^{2})
  - Water: 0 sq mi (0.00 km^{2})
- Elevation: 3,461 ft (1,055 m)

Population (2020)
  - Total: 167
  - Density: 1,065.4/sq mi (411.34/km^{2})
- Time zone: UTC-7 (MST)
  - Summer (DST): UTC-6 (MDT)
- FIPS code: 04-16360
- GNIS feature ID: 2410242

Cottonwood is a census-designated place (CDP) in Apache County, Arizona, United States. The population was 226 at the 2010 census.

== Geography ==
Cottonwood is located about 21 miles (34 km) west of Chinle and 22 miles (35 km) east of Pinon.

According to the United States Census Bureau, the CDP has a total area of 0.14 square miles (0.37 km^{2}), all land.

== Demographics ==
Historical population
Census	Pop.	Note	%±
2020	167		—
U.S. Decennial Census

== Education ==
The Bureau of Indian Education (BIE) operates the Cottonwood Day School in Cottonwood.

Cottonwood is in the Chinle Unified School District, which operates Chinle High School.
