= Timothy Begay =

Navajo artist (1919–2006)

- Born: September 23, 1919; Chinle, Arizona, U.S.
- Died: November 17, 2006 (aged 87); Albuquerque, New Mexico, U.S.
- Citizenship: Navajo Nation, American
- Education: Santa Fe Indian School
- Occupation: painter

Timothy Bradley Begay (September 23, 1919 – November 17, 2006) was an American Navajo painter who lived in Chinle, Arizona. Begay has exhibited his work across the country, including at the Museum of New Mexico and the Philbrook Museum of Art. Some of his works are in the permanent collection of institutions including Memorial Art Gallery at the University of Rochester and the Woolaroc Museum. He utilizes media such as watercolor to paint figurative scenes, often showing people with livestock.

Begay was born in Chinle, Arizona on September 23, 1919. He studied at the Santa Fe Indian School, graduating in 1942. Begay went on to be a member of the United States Armed Forces, serving in the European theatre of World War II.

Begay died in Albuquerque, New Mexico on November 17, 2006, at the age of 87.
