= Basketball or Nothing =

American reality competition show on Netflix

- Genre: Reality television
- Country of origin: United States
- Original language: English
- No. of seasons: 1
- No. of episodes: 6

Production
- Executive producers: Todd Donnelly; Joseph Witthohn; Notah Begay III
- Production companies: Main Event Productions; WorkShop Content Studios

Original release
- Network: Netflix
- Release: August 2, 2019

Basketball or Nothing is a 2019 American reality television series on Netflix filmed in Chinle, Arizona. The premise revolves around the lives of the Chinle High School boys’ basketball team based on the Navajo Nation reservation, the largest reservation in America. The series featured Raul Mendoza as coach of the team.

The full season of Basketball or Nothing consisting of 6 episodes has been released on August 2, 2019.

== Release ==
Basketball or Nothing was released on August 2, 2019, on Netflix streaming.
