= Blue Gap, Arizona =

Unincorporated community in the state of Arizona, United States

Blue Gap, Arizona Tachíí/Bis Dootłʼizh Ndeeshgiizh (Navajo)
- Unincorporated community
- Location within Arizona Location within the United States
- Coordinates: 36°10′15″N 109°56′47″W
- Country: United States
- State: Arizona
- County: Apache
- Elevation: 6,496 ft (1,980 m)
- Time zone: UTC-7 (Mountain (MST))
- ZIP code: 86520
- Area code: 928
- GNIS feature ID: 25260

Blue Gap (Navajo: Tachíí/Bis Dootłʼizh Ndeeshgiizh) is an unincorporated community in Apache County, Arizona, United States. Blue Gap is on the Navajo Nation 22 miles (35 km) west of Chinle. The community is in Polacca Wash near State Road 291 in western Apache County. Blue Gap has a post office with ZIP code 86520.
