= Cormac Antram =

American priest (1926–2013)

Father Cormac Antram O.F.M. (May 18, 1926 – October 1, 2013), born James Antram and known as Father Cormac, was a Catholic priest and member of the Franciscan order who became known for his work on the Navajo Nation and with the Navajo language.

== Biography ==
Born in Roswell, New Mexico, Antram became a Franciscan in 1945, studied at Duns Scotus College in Southfield, Michigan from 1946 to 1950, and was ordained a priest in 1954. He was assigned to St. Michael's Mission in St. Michaels, Arizona and spent his career at institutions around the Navajo Nation, including in Chinle, Houck, and Kayenta, Arizona, and in Gallup and Tohatchi, New Mexico.

Antram learned to speak Navajo fluently, and in 1958 began a bilingual radio program, known as "The Padre's Hour" (although the programs were actually only a half-hour in length) that became widely popular among the Navajo. He continued to host the show for more than 45 years (except for an 18-month stint by another priest in the 1960s), making it one of the longest-running programs in American radio history. He also supervised a 20-year effort to produce an authorized translation of the Catholic Mass into Navajo, and became known as an expert on the language, sometimes consulted by native speakers with questions about the language. He adapted other Catholic prayers into Navajo, including a version of the Gloria Patri ("Glory be to the Father") prayer, sung to a melody associated with the traditional Navajo Blessing Way chant.

He died in 2013 in Albuquerque, New Mexico, aged 87. He was reported to be the last Franciscan priest who could speak the Navajo Language fluently. In 2011, his celebration of the Navajo Mass was recorded on video to preserve it for future use. He also authored two books collecting columns and stories from his column in the diocese newspaper.
