= Nazlini, Arizona =

CDP in Apache County, Arizona

Nazlini, Arizona Názlíní (Navajo)
- Census-designated place
- Location in Apache County and the state of Arizona

- Location in the United States
- Coordinates: 35°54′56″N 109°28′21″W
- Country: United States
- State: Arizona
- County: Apache

Area
  - Total: 7.46 sq mi (19.32 km^{2})
  - Land: 7.45 sq mi (19.30 km^{2})
  - Water: 0.0077 sq mi (0.02 km^{2})
- Elevation: 6,221 ft (1,896 m)

Population (2020)
  - Total: 505
  - Density: 67.8/sq mi (26.17/km^{2})
- Time zone: UTC-7 (MST)
- ZIP code: 86540
- Area code: 928
- FIPS code: 04-49010
- GNIS feature ID: 2408907

Nazlini (Navajo: Názlíní) is a census-designated place (CDP) in Apache County, Arizona, United States. The population was 489 at the 2010 census. Nearby are Nazlini Creek and Nazlini Canyon. Nazlini Canyon is the site of many Native American ruins and campsites that were abandoned when erosion made them unusable.

== Geography ==
According to the United States Census Bureau, the CDP has a total area of 7.5 square miles (19.3 km^{2}), all land.

== Demographics ==
Historical population
Census	Pop.	Note	%±
2000	397		—
2010	489		23.2%
2020	505		3.3%
U.S. Decennial Census

As of the census of 2000, there were 397 people, 101 households, and 76 families living in the CDP. The population density was 53.1 inhabitants per square mile (20.5/km^{2}). There were 129 housing units at an average density of 17.2 per square mile (6.6/km^{2}). The racial makeup of the CDP was 99% Native American and 1% from other races. 2% of the population were Hispanic or Latino of any race.

There were 101 households, out of which 45.5% had children under the age of 18 living with them, 34.7% were married couples living together, 35.6% had a female householder with no husband present, and 23.8% were non-families. 22.8% of all households were made up of individuals, and 6.9% had someone living alone who was 65 years of age or older. The average household size was 3.89 and the average family size was 4.68.

In the CDP, the age distribution of the population shows 46.3% under the age of 18, 10.8% from 18 to 24, 22.7% from 25 to 44, 13.6% from 45 to 64, and 6.5% who were 65 years of age or older. The median age was 19 years. For every 100 females, there were 93.7 males. For every 100 females age 18 and over, there were 88.5 males.

The median income for a household in the CDP was $11,484, and the median income for a family was $10,859. Males had a median income of $22,000 versus $10,417 for females. The per capita income for the CDP was $5,036. About 74.1% of families and 73.7% of the population were below the poverty line, including 79.5% of those under age 18 and 35.3% of those age 65 or over.

== Education ==
The entire Nazlini census-designated place is within the Chinle Unified School District, which operates Chinle High School.

Some areas considered to be "Nazlini" that are not in the CDP are served by the Ganado Unified School District. The area is served by Ganado Primary School, Ganado Intermediate School, Ganado Middle School, and Ganado High School.

In addition, the Nazlini Community School, which has a Ganado address, is operated by the Bureau of Indian Affairs's Office of Education Programs.

== See also ==
- List of census-designated places in Arizona
