= Walsh McDermott =

American physician

Walsh McDermott (October 24, 1909 – October 17, 1981) was an American physician, medical researcher and public health specialist. In his early career, he researched antibiotic agents against tuberculosis and syphilis, earning a Lasker Award for his work on isoniazid, a drug used to treat tuberculosis. His later career focused on public health efforts, and he became a professor in public health at Cornell University.

== Early life ==
McDermott was born on October 24, 1909, in New Haven, Connecticut. He attended Phillips Academy and obtained an undergraduate degree from Princeton University in 1930. He graduated from Columbia University College of Physicians and Surgeons in 1934.

== Career ==
McDermott completed his internship and residency at New York Hospital, which was then a teaching hospital for Cornell University Medical College. His early career was interrupted by repeated exacerbations of tuberculosis; his health eventually recovered by 1950 after treatment with isoniazid and surgery to remove part of his lung. McDermott's early work was in infectious disease research and involved investigating drugs against tuberculosis and syphilis. He traveled to Mexico to conduct a study comparing different antibiotic therapies against syphilis, and showed that chloramphenicol was significantly superior to tetracycline and amphotericin B. He conducted pioneering research into the use of streptomycin in tuberculosis, and in 1955 he received a Lasker Award for his research on isoniazid, the same antibiotic that had brought his own tuberculosis into remission.

Later, McDermott focused on public health efforts, starting with the Navajo populations of Arizona and New Mexico, whom he learned were dying from fatal forms of tuberculosis at much greater rates than the rest of the U.S. population. Shocked at the health conditions in the disadvantaged Navajo population, he organized a public health initiative, the Many Farms Project, to bring basic healthcare and isoniazid therapy to Navajo people. He became a professor of public health and chair of Cornell University's public health department in 1955 and led local projects to improve healthcare in New York City.

In 1967, he was elected to the National Academy of Sciences. He became a special advisor to the Robert Wood Johnson Foundation in the early 1970s. Between 1947 and 1968, he served on several councils and committees for the National Institutes of Health, and was a member of the World Health Organization's advisory committees on tuberculosis (1958–73) and medical research (1964–67). He was appointed Professor of Public Affairs in Medicine at Cornell University in 1972 and became Emeritus Professor in Public Health and Medicine in 1975.

== Death ==
McDermott died on October 17, 1981, from a heart attack at his vacation home in Pawling, New York.
