= Robert Draper (painter) =

Navajo and Hopi/Laguna artist (1938–2000)

Robert D. Draper
- Born: Robert Martin; 20 November 1938; Canyon del Muerto, Chinle, Apache County, Arizona, U.S.
- Died: 2000 (aged 61–62)
- Education: Chinle Boarding School, Intermountain Indian School, Institute of American Indian Arts
- Notable work: "The White House Ruins in Canyon de Chelly" (1966)
- Movement: realism

Robert D. Draper (born as Robert Martin; 1938–2000) was a Navajo (Diné) and Hopi/Laguna contemporary artist, known for his watercolor paintings. He often painted realistic landscapes of the Navajo (Diné) Reservation and Canyon de Chelly.

== Biography ==
Robert D. Draper was born November 20, 1938, in Canyon del Muerto in Chinle, Arizona. Chinle is located on the rim of the Canyon de Chelly National Monument. His mother Janet Descheeny was Navajo, and his father Frank Martin was Navajo, Hopi and Laguna. Draper's early education was on the Navajo (Diné) Reservation.

He was raised by his grandparents and changed his name to Robert Draper at age 8, while attending the Chinle Boarding School (now known as Many Farms Community School) from 1947 to 1951. He also attended the Intermountain Indian School from 1951 to 1956, and the Institute of American Indian Arts. He studied art under George Fox. Draper served in the United States Marine Corps. He later worked as an art instructor at the Chinle Boarding School.

Draper's artwork rejected the flatsyle painting typically associated with traditional Navajo painting during this time period, and instead he used perspective and shadow in his works. His art is in the public museum collection at the National Museum of the American Indian.

== Awards ==
- 1985 – first prize and second prize in fine arts division, Annual Navajo Show, Museum of Northern Arizona, Flagstaff, Arizona
- 1975 – first place in non-traditional painting landscapes, for painting "Spring Grass", Gallup Inter-Tribal Ceremonial, Gallup, New Mexico
- 1973 – first prize, New Mexico State Fair
- 1973 – best in show, Gallup Inter-Tribal Ceremonial, Gallup, New Mexico
- 1968 – Woodard Memorial award, for painting "Rain Comes to Round Rock", Gallup Indian Ceremonial, Gallup, New Mexico
- 1966 – first place in non-traditional painting, for painting "The White House Ruins in Canyon de Chelly", Gallup Inter-Tribal Ceremonial, Gallup, New Mexico

== See also ==
- List of Native American artists
