= Thomas Claw =

American Navajo code talker (1922–2009)

Thomas Claw (February 23, 1922 – May 26, 2009) was an American Navajo Code Talker during World War II. He served with the 1st Marine Division throughout the Pacific theater during the war.

Claw was born in Chinle, Arizona, on February 23, 1922. He attended Fort Wingate High School before enlisting in the U.S. Marine Corps on March 13, 1943, in Phoenix, Arizona. Claw, who was fluent in Navajo, was sent to Camp Pendleton to be trained as a code talker.

Claw served with the 1st Marine Division as a code talker throughout World War II. He was stationed in Australia, New Caledonia, New Britain, the Solomon Islands, Palau and the Ryukyu Islands.

Claw moved to Parker, Arizona, with his wife, Barbara, following the end of World War II and his departure from the Marines. He worked as a water master for the Colorado River Indian Irrigation Project, a program run by the Bureau of Indian Affairs, for approximately twenty years.

Thomas Claw died of cancer at the Northern Arizona VA Health Care Center in Prescott, Arizona, on May 26, 2009, at the age of 87.

Navajo Nation President Joe Shirley signed a proclamation ordering all flags lowered to half staff until Claw's funeral stating, "Just as we bade farewell to one of our honored Code Talkers, we sadly hear of the loss of another. It is with deep regret that we learned of the passing of Navajo Code Talker Thomas Claw, another of our distinguished warriors from World War II."
