= Navajo AIDS Network =

AIDS service organization

The Navajo AIDS Network (NAN) is a Chinle, Arizona-based HIV prevention and AIDS service organization for American Indians who reside within the Navajo Nation, located in western New Mexico and eastern Arizona. NAN was founded in 1990 as a volunteer organization and was incorporated as a 501(c)(3) non-profit in 1993.

NAN, which operates independently of the Navajo tribal government, has offered anonymous HIV testing and referrals to medical services. It has also distributed condoms to help prevent the spread of HIV/AIDS and other sexually transmitted diseases.

NAN has also worked to further the cause of raising tolerance for the homosexual, bisexual and transgender members of the Navajo Nation, who had traditionally not been able to openly discuss their sexuality. In 2005, NAN sponsored the first Hózhǫ́ Náhásdlį́į́ʼ Summer Gathering, which focused on health and social issues relating specifically to the Navajo LGBT community.
