= Keats Begay =

American painter

- Born: May 17, 1923; Chinle, Arizona
- Died: January 5, 1987 (aged 63)
- Citizenship: Navajo Nation, American
- Education: Santa Fe Indian School
- Occupation: painter

Keats Begay (May 17, 1923 – January 5, 1987) was a Navajo American painter who lived in Chinle, Arizona and was active in the late 1930s. Begay has exhibited his work across the country, including at the National Gallery of Art, and is known for his colorful, flat style paintings. Some of his works are in the permanent collection of institutions including the Indian Arts and Crafts Board, Museum of Northern Arizona, the Southwest Museum of the American Indian and the Museum of New Mexico.

Begay studied at the Santa Fe Indian School. Begay's work included stylized depictions of colorful landscapes and of everyday life, sometimes integrated with Navajo sandpainting and other symbolic motifs.

Begay was a long-distance runner, earning a state championship. He served in the United States Armed Forces during World War II, surviving the Bataan Death March in April 1942 and then spending the remainder of the war as a prisoner of war in Japan. Begay compared his experience on the Bataan Death March as comparable to the Long Walk of the Navajo in 1864, in which Navajo were forcibly moved to a reservation.
