= Vernon, Arizona =

CDP in Apache County, Arizona

- Census-designated place
- Location of Vernon in Apache County, Arizona.

- Location within Arizona
- Coordinates: 34°15′03″N 109°41′33″W
- Country: United States
- State: Arizona
- County: Apache

Area
  - Total: 0.57 sq mi (1.47 km^{2})
  - Land: 0.57 sq mi (1.47 km^{2})
  - Water: 0 sq mi (0.00 km^{2})
- Elevation: 6,943 ft (2,116 m)

Population (2020)
  - Total: 126
  - Density: 222.6/sq mi (85.93/km^{2})
- Time zone: UTC-7 (Mountain (MST))
- ZIP code: 85940
- Area code: 928
- GNIS feature ID: 2582891

Vernon is an unincorporated community and census-designated place (CDP) in Apache County, Arizona, United States. As of the 2020 census, it had a population of 126. Vernon is 19 miles (31 km) east of Show Low. Vernon has a post office with ZIP code 85940.

Vernon was settled by B.H. Wilhelm Jr, who named it in 1894 for William Tecumseh Vernon. It was important at first as a sawmill town, but as activity diminished, people moved away. It had a Church of Jesus Christ of Latter-Day Saints ward, but they disbanded it in 1954, when the sawmill business finally moved to the vicinity of Lakeside.

== Demographics ==
Historical population
Census	Pop.	Note	%±
2010	122		—
2020	126		3.3%
U.S. Decennial Census

During recent years Vernon has grown little. Some ranches have been active since 1870.

== Education ==
Its local school district is the Vernon Elementary School District.
