= Many Farms, Arizona =

CDP in Apache County, Arizona

Many Farms, Arizona Dáʼákʼeh Halání (Navajo)
- Census-designated place
- Location in Apache County and the state of Arizona

- Location in the United States
- Coordinates: 36°21′36″N 109°37′41″W
- Country: United States
- State: Arizona
- County: Apache

Area
  - Total: 8.18 sq mi (21.18 km^{2})
  - Land: 8.15 sq mi (21.12 km^{2})
  - Water: 0.023 sq mi (0.06 km^{2})
- Elevation: 5,319 ft (1,621 m)

Population (2020)
  - Total: 1,243
  - Density: 152.4/sq mi (58.86/km^{2})
- Time zone: UTC-7 (MST)
  - Summer (DST): UTC-6 (MDT)
- ZIP code: 86538
- Area code: 928
- FIPS code: 04-44200
- GNIS feature ID: 2408169

Many Farms (Navajo: Dáʼákʼeh Halání) is a census-designated place (CDP) in Apache County, Arizona, United States. The population was 1,348 at the 2010 census.

== Geography ==
According to the United States Census Bureau, the CDP has a total area of 8.2 square miles (21.2 km^{2}), of which 8.1 square miles (21.1 km^{2}) is land and 0.039 square miles (0.1 km^{2}), or 0.3%, is water.

=== Climate ===
According to the Köppen Climate Classification system, Many Farms has a semi-arid climate, abbreviated "BSk" on climate maps.

== History ==
Many Farms is an English translation of the Navajo name of the area and is descriptive. The farms became fully irrigated in 1937.

From 1952 to 1962, the Many Farms community was the location of two major medical experiments led by Walsh McDermott. The goal of the first experiment was to test the efficacy of the drug isoniazid as a treatment for tuberculosis (TB), which was then widespread and largely fatal among the Navajo despite the availability of TB medication elsewhere in the country. McDermott chose the reservation because he needed a population that had not been previously exposed to streptomycin, then the most advanced treatment for TB. While McDermott's initial TB experiment was a success, his second experiment, in which he attempted a more broad-based healthcare intervention, failed to meaningfully reduce disease morbidity and mortality among the Navajo due to conflicts with the Indian Health Service, as well as the experiment's inability to address poverty, which was the underlying cause of most disease.

== Demographics ==
Historical population
Census	Pop.	Note	%±
2000	1,548		—
2010	1,348		−12.9%
2020	1,243		−7.8%
U.S. Decennial Census

=== 2020 census ===
As of the 2020 census, Many Farms had a population of 1,243. The median age was 32.9 years. 30.3% of residents were under the age of 18 and 13.6% of residents were 65 years of age or older. For every 100 females there were 104.8 males, and for every 100 females age 18 and over there were 96.4 males age 18 and over.

0.0% of residents lived in urban areas, while 100.0% lived in rural areas.

There were 374 households in Many Farms, of which 39.0% had children under the age of 18 living in them. Of all households, 37.2% were married-couple households, 21.7% were households with a male householder and no spouse or partner present, and 36.9% were households with a female householder and no spouse or partner present. About 24.6% of all households were made up of individuals and 9.4% had someone living alone who was 65 years of age or older.

There were 412 housing units, of which 9.2% were vacant. The homeowner vacancy rate was 0.0% and the rental vacancy rate was 7.4%.

Racial composition as of the 2020 census
Race	Number	Percent
White	37	3.0%
Black or African American	0	0.0%
American Indian and Alaska Native	1,185	95.3%
Asian	0	0.0%
Native Hawaiian and Other Pacific Islander	0	0.0%
Some other race	6	0.5%
Two or more races	15	1.2%
Hispanic or Latino (of any race)	10	0.8%

=== 2000 census ===
As of the census of 2000, there were 1,548 people, 433 households, and 313 families residing in the CDP. The population density was 188.2 inhabitants per square mile (72.7/km^{2}). There were 606 housing units at an average density of 73.7 per square mile (28.5/km^{2}). The racial makeup of the CDP was 88.4% Native American, 7.8% White, 0.3% Black or African American, 0.1% Asian, 0.3% from other races, and 3.0% from two or more races. 2.1% of the population were Hispanic or Latino of any race.

There were 433 households, out of which 48.7% had children under the age of 18 living with them, 44.6% were married couples living together, 23.1% had a female householder with no husband present, and 27.7% were non-families. 24.9% of all households were made up of individuals, and 2.5% had someone living alone who was 65 years of age or older. The average household size was 3.58 and the average family size was 4.39.

In the CDP, the age distribution of the population shows 42.4% under the age of 18, 9.6% from 18 to 24, 26.7% from 25 to 44, 18.2% from 45 to 64, and 3.2% who were 65 years of age or older. The median age was 23 years. For every 100 females, there were 92.8 males. For every 100 females age 18 and over, there were 91.8 males.

The median income for a household in the CDP was $30,089, and the median income for a family was $31,316. Males had a median income of $32,566 versus $25,945 for females. The per capita income for the CDP was $9,995. About 28.2% of families and 31.7% of the population were below the poverty line, including 37.9% of those under age 18 and 53.6% of those age 65 or over.

== Education ==
Many Farms is a part of the Chinle Unified School District.

Many Farms Public School (K–8), is in the area considered to be Many Farms. The district also operates Chinle High School.

In addition, the Bureau of Indian Education (BIE), formerly the U.S. Bureau of Indian Affairs's Office of Education Programs, operates the Many Farms High School (MFHS) in Many Farms.

Many Farms Community School (MFCS), a tribally-controlled K-8 boarding school affiliated with the BIE, is in Many Farms. It was previously known as the Chinle Boarding School and was in Chinle until 1976, although its name did not immediately change. By 2012 the name changed to its current one.

There was a Bureau of Indian Affairs (BIA) school called Many Farms Boarding School. From circa 1975 to 1979 the school had 11 principals. In 1979 it had 500 students. The school had two classroom buildings, and the school spent $3 million in 1985 to have them renovated. By 1986 there were structural problems with these classroom buildings and administrators feared they would be unable to be repaired. That year there were 600 students.
