= Vernon Elementary School District =

School district in Apache County, Arizona

Address
- 90 County Road Number 3139 Vernon, Arizona, 85940; United States

District information
- Type: Public
- Grades: PreK–8
- NCES District ID: 0400022

Students and staff
- Students: 94
- Teachers: 11.93 (FTE)
- Staff: 12.82 (FTE)
- Student–teacher ratio: 7.88

Other information
- Website: www.vernon.k12.az.us

Vernon Elementary School District #9 is a K–8 school district in Vernon, Apache County, Arizona. It operates a single K–8 school.

== History ==
In 2019 the district established its preschool program.

In 2020 its student population was above 100.

Monica Baraja served as superintendent and as principal until September 2020, when she resigned. The school community did not anticipate that she would do this.

From 2020 to 2021 the number of students in the district decreased by 24%.

== Operations ==
As of 2007 the school district uses volunteers to provide services that it cannot afford to have paid employees do; for example, parents volunteered as librarians.
