= Rough Rock, Arizona =

CDP in Apache County, Arizona

Rough Rock, Arizona Tséchʼízhí (Navajo)
- Census-designated place
- Location in Apache County and the state of Arizona

- Location in the United States
- Coordinates: 36°24′38″N 109°52′10″W
- Country: United States
- State: Arizona
- County: Apache

Area
  - Total: 12.75 sq mi (33.03 km^{2})
  - Land: 12.75 sq mi (33.02 km^{2})
  - Water: 0.0039 sq mi (0.01 km^{2})
- Elevation: 6,217 ft (1,895 m)

Population (2020)
  - Total: 428
  - Density: 33.6/sq mi (12.96/km^{2})
- Time zone: UTC-7 (MST)
- ZIP code: 86503
- Area code: 928
- FIPS code: 04-61370
- GNIS feature ID: 2409215

Rough Rock (Navajo: Tséchʼízhí) is a census-designated place (CDP) in Apache County, Arizona, United States. The population was 414 at the 2010 census.

== Geography ==
According to the United States Census Bureau, the CDP has a total area of 12.8 square miles (33.1 km^{2}), all land.

== Demographics ==
Historical population
Census	Pop.	Note	%±
2000	1,300		—
2010	414		−68.2%
2020	428		3.4%
U.S. Decennial Census

As of the census of 2000, there were 1300 people, 113 households, and 89 families living in the CDP. The population density was 36.5 inhabitants per square mile (14.1/km^{2}). There were 152 housing units at an average density of 11.8 per square mile (4.6/km^{2}). The racial makeup of the CDP was 96.2% Native American, 2.8% White, 0.6% Asian, and 0.4% from two or more races. 0.2% of the population were Hispanic or Latino of any race.

There were 113 households, out of which 50.4% had children under the age of 18 living with them, 54.0% were married couples living together, 18.6% had a female householder with no husband present, and 21.2% were non-families. 19.5% of all households were made up of individuals, and 4.4% had someone living alone who was 65 years of age or older. The average household size was 4.15 and the average family size was 4.97.

In the CDP, the age distribution of the population shows 42.9% under the age of 18, 9.6% from 18 to 24, 26.4% from 25 to 44, 16.6% from 45 to 64, and 4.5% who were 65 years of age or older. The median age was 23 years. For every 100 females, there were 95.4 males. For every 100 females age 18 and over, there were 90.1 males.

The median income for a household in the CDP was $26,172, and the median income for a family was $26,484. Males had a median income of $28,068 versus $11,346 for females. The per capita income for the CDP was $6,741. About 23.7% of families and 29.8% of the population were below the poverty line, including 37.2% of those under age 18 and 20.0% of those age 65 or over.

== Education ==
The area is served by Chinle Unified School District #24, which operates Chinle High School.

In addition the Rough Rock Community School is a tribal school associated with the Bureau of Indian Education.

== Popular culture ==
The town is mentioned in Judy Collins' "Song For Martin": "In Rough Rock, Arizona, he lived for many years alone. A gangly kid from Colorado, who could sing the sweetest song...."
