= Lukachukai, Arizona =

CDP in Apache County, Arizona

Lukachukai, Arizona Lókʼaaʼchʼégai (Navajo)
- Census-designated place
- Location in Apache County and the state of Arizona

- Location in Arizona Location in the United States
- Coordinates: 36°24′30″N 109°14′51″W
- Country: United States
- State: Arizona
- County: Apache

Area
  - Total: 22.02 sq mi (57.03 km^{2})
  - Land: 21.98 sq mi (56.94 km^{2})
  - Water: 0.035 sq mi (0.09 km^{2})
- Elevation: 6,569 ft (2,002 m)

Population (2020)
  - Total: 1,424
  - Density: 64.8/sq mi (25.01/km^{2})
- Time zone: UTC-7 (MST)
- ZIP code: 86507
- Area code: 928
- FIPS code: 04-42660
- GNIS feature ID: 2408152

Lukachukai (Navajo: Lókʼaaʼchʼégai) is a census-designated place (CDP) in Apache County, Arizona, United States. The population was 1,701 at the 2010 census. It is within the Navajo Nation.

== Etymology ==
Lukachukai comes from a Navajo word translated as "a field of white reeds".

== Geography ==
According to the United States Census Bureau, the CDP has a total area of 22.0 square miles (57.0 km^{2}), of which 22.0 square miles (56.9 km^{2}) is land and 0.039 square miles (0.1 km^{2}), or 0.15%, is water.

=== Climate ===
According to the Köppen Climate Classification system, Lukachukai has a semi-arid climate, abbreviated "BSk" on climate maps.

== Demographics ==
Historical population
Census	Pop.	Note	%±
2000	1,565		—
2010	1,701		8.7%
2020	1,424		−16.3%
U.S. Decennial Census

=== 2020 census ===
As of the 2020 census, Lukachukai had a population of 1,424. The median age was 33.4 years. 28.0% of residents were under the age of 18 and 13.1% of residents were 65 years of age or older. For every 100 females there were 87.9 males, and for every 100 females age 18 and over there were 89.8 males age 18 and over.

0.0% of residents lived in urban areas, while 100.0% lived in rural areas.

There were 445 households in Lukachukai, of which 38.2% had children under the age of 18 living in them. Of all households, 28.5% were married-couple households, 23.4% were households with a male householder and no spouse or partner present, and 40.2% were households with a female householder and no spouse or partner present. About 25.4% of all households were made up of individuals and 7.6% had someone living alone who was 65 years of age or older.

There were 528 housing units, of which 15.7% were vacant. The homeowner vacancy rate was 0.8% and the rental vacancy rate was 13.8%.

Racial composition as of the 2020 census
Race	Number	Percent
White	2	0.1%
Black or African American	0	0.0%
American Indian and Alaska Native	1,411	99.1%
Asian	0	0.0%
Native Hawaiian and Other Pacific Islander	0	0.0%
Some other race	3	0.2%
Two or more races	8	0.6%
Hispanic or Latino (of any race)	15	1.1%

=== 2000 census ===
As of the census of 2000, there were 1,565 people, 423 households, and 326 families living in the CDP. The population density was 71.0 inhabitants per square mile (27.4/km^{2}). There were 634 housing units at an average density of 28.8 per square mile (11.1/km^{2}). The racial makeup of the CDP was 98.2% Native American, 1.2% White, 0.1% Asian, 0.3% from other races, and 0.3% from two or more races. 1.0% of the population were Hispanic or Latino of any race.

There were 423 households, out of which 44.9% had children under the age of 18 living with them, 48.2% were married couples living together, 22.7% had a female householder with no husband present, and 22.9% were non-families. 21.3% of all households were made up of individuals, and 7.8% had someone living alone who was 65 years of age or older. The average household size was 3.70 and the average family size was 4.41.

In the CDP, the age distribution of the population shows 41.1% under the age of 18, 10.7% from 18 to 24, 24.4% from 25 to 44, 16.4% from 45 to 64, and 7.5% who were 65 years of age or older. The median age was 24 years. For every 100 females, there were 94.9 males. For every 100 females age 18 and over, there were 96.6 males.

The median income for a household in the CDP was $10,179, and the median income for a family was $11,250. Males had a median income of $17,604 versus $15,893 for females. The per capita income for the CDP was $3,380. About 65.0% of families and 61.9% of the population were below the poverty line, including 61.9% of those under age 18 and 49.3% of those age 65 or over.

== Education ==
Lukachukai is a part of the Chinle Unified School District in the Navajo Nation. Lukachukai is zoned to Tsaile Public School (K-8) and Chinle High School.

== See also ==
- List of census-designated places in Arizona
