= Chinle Unified School District =

School district in Apache County, Arizona

Chinle Unified School District No. 24 (CUSD) is a public unified school district headquartered in Chinle, a census-designated place in Apache County, Arizona, on the Navajo Nation, United States. It is managed by a five-member elected school board, each of whom is Navajo, and operates by state rules. As of 2020, nearly all of the district's 3600 students are Navajo.

CUSD serves several unincorporated areas in Apache County, including Chinle, Cottonwood, Del Muerto, Lukachukai, Many Farms, Nazlini, Rough Rock, Sehili, Tsaile, and small portions of Round Rock and Sawmill.

The district has an area of 4,200 square miles (11,000 km^{2}). Its buses travel 6000 miles per day to transport students to and from the schools. It is within the Navajo Nation.

== History ==
Chinle Unified School District was organized by the state of Arizona and Apache County in 1958. It celebrated its 50th anniversary in 2008. A district gathering at the Wildcat Den, the community arena, on July 25, 2008, celebrated this milestone event.

In July 1983 the Red Mesa Unified School District was formed, splitting from the Chinle School District.

== Demographics ==
In 2016 the district had 3,300 students. As of 2020 the district had about 3,600 students, with about 99% being Navajo people, a.k.a. Diné. In 1998 the district had more than 4,500 students, with 95% being Navajo.

== Schools ==
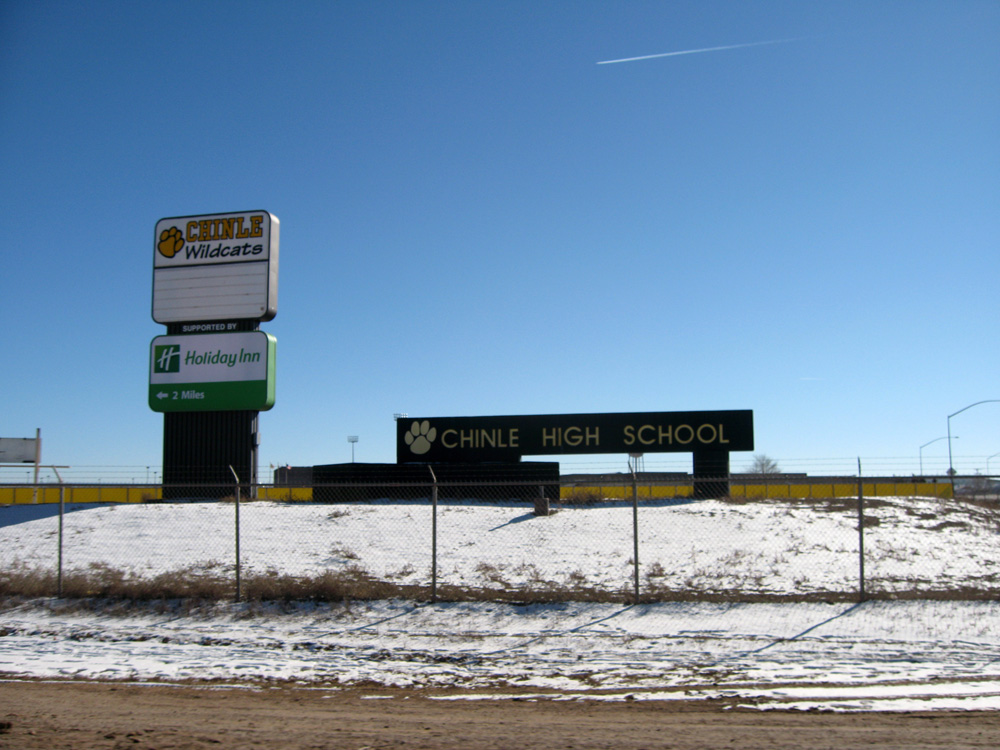
Sign for Chinle High School

High school

- Chinle High School

K-8 schools

- Many Farms Public School, serves 425 students
- Tsaile Public School – In proximity to Diné College

Junior high/middle schools

- Chinle Junior High School

Primary schools (K–6)

- Mesa View Elementary School
- Chinle Elementary School
- Canyon De Chelly Elementary School – This school serves approximately 600 students in Chinle. The community of Chinle is located next to the Canyon De Chelly National Monument. The school is approximately 97% Navajo.
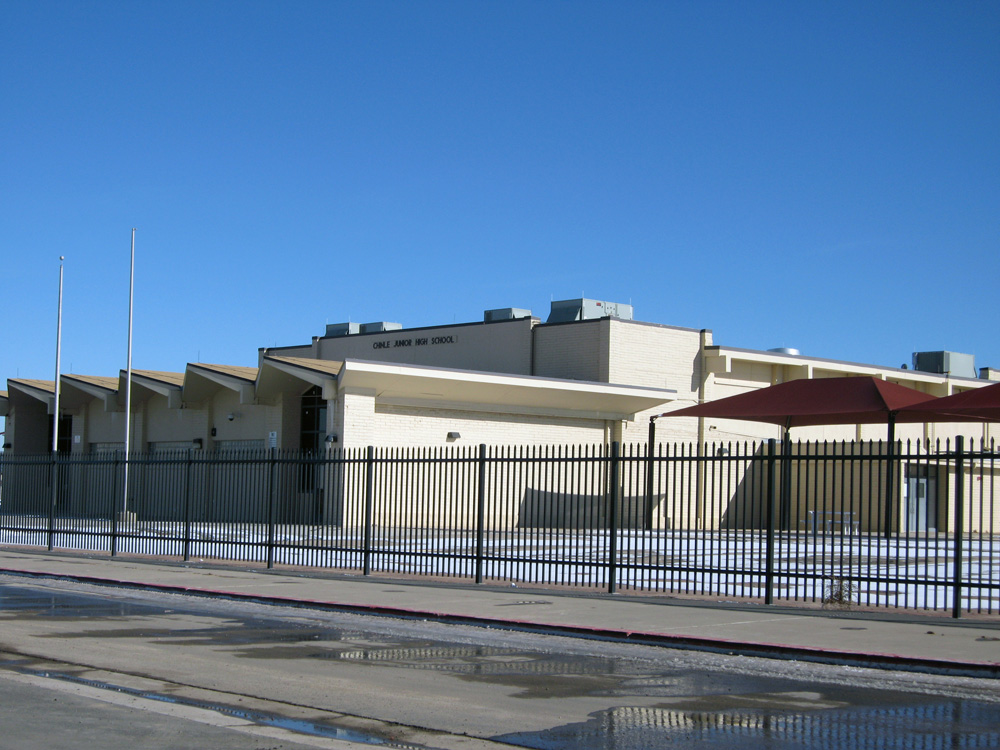
Chinle Junior High School

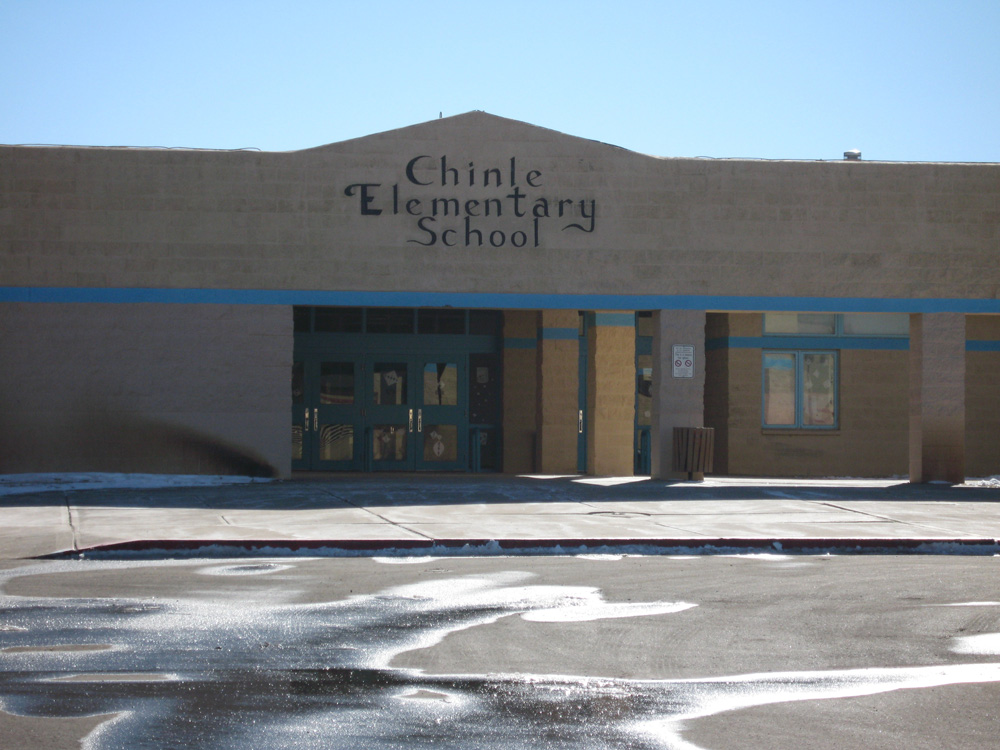
Chinle Elementary School

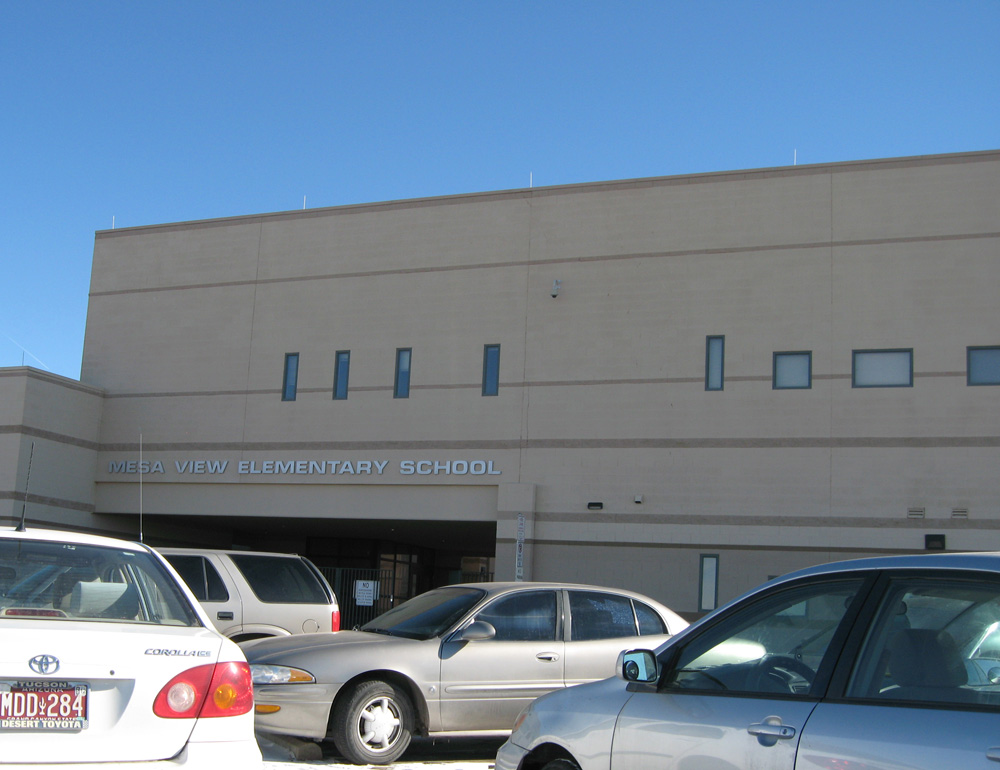
Mesa View Elementary School

=== Former schools ===
The following were reassigned when the Red Mesa Unified School District formed:

- Red Mesa Elementary School
- Red Mesa Junior High School
- Red Mesa High School

== Other facilities ==
The district operates multiple housing complexes for employees. CKC Phase II Homes and CKC Phase III Homes are next to the district headquarters in Chinle. CJHS Bobcat Homes is adjacent to Chinle Elementary School and Chinle Junior High School. Many Farms Homes and Tsaile Homes are in those respective communities.

== Transportation ==
As of 2016 over 60% of the bus routes include unpaved roads, something that increases wear and tear on the buses.

== H1B ==
- Chinle Unified School District sponsors h1b for teachers.
