= Raul Mendoza (coach) =

Raul Mendoza is an American basketball coach of high school students; he is known for specializing in work with Navajo student players. Since 2016, he has been the basketball coach at Chinle High School on the Navajo Nation in Arizona.

He previously coached at Window Rock High School and Holbrook High School, also in the Nation. For his entire career as a coach, he has worked with Navajo student players. His accomplishments include more than 800 victories. He has won two Coach of the Year awards.

He is of Mexican and Tohono O’odham ancestry.

== Representation in other media ==
The 6-part docuseries Basketball or Nothing (2019) featured Mendoza (as himself) coaching the Chinle Wildcats in the 2017–2018 season. They were pursuing a state championship when their team was at top strength.
