= Chinle High School =

Public high school in Arizona, U.S.

Coordinates: 36°09′25″N 109°34′56″W

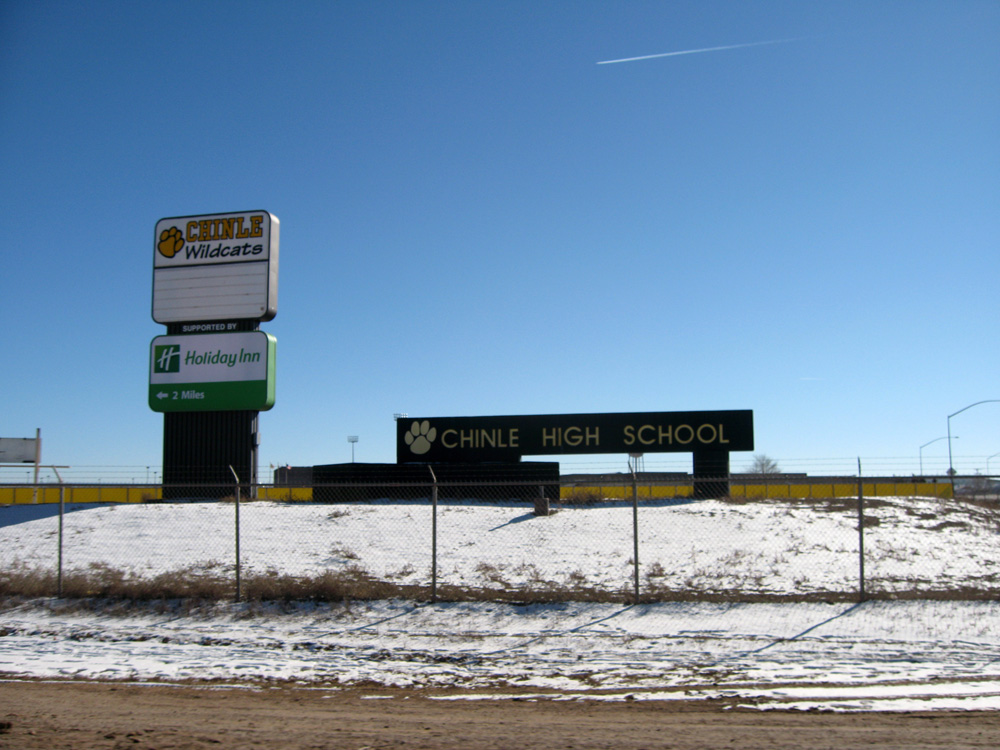

Location
- US Hwy 191; Chinle, Arizona 86503; United States

Information
- School type: Public high school
- School district: Chinle Unified School District
- CEEB code: 030048
- Principal: Dr. Raymond Andrade
- Staff: 60.00 (FTE)
- Grades: 9-12
- Enrollment: 926 (2023-2024)
- Student to teacher ratio: 15.43
- Colors: Black, Vegas gold and white
- Nickname: Wildcats
- Rival: Window Rock High School
- Website: chs.chinleusd.k12.az.us

Chinle High School is a public high school (grades 9 to 12) in Chinle, an unincorporated area of Apache County, Arizona, United States. The school is the only high school in the Chinle Unified School District, and all of the district's elementary and middle schools feed into it. Chinle High School serves several unincorporated areas in Apache County, including Chinle, Cottonwood, Del Muerto, Lukachukai, Many Farms, Nazlini, Rough Rock, Sehili, Tsaile, and small portions of Round Rock and Sawmill. The areas the school serves are within the Navajo Nation.

The school is the largest high school within the Navajo nation. As of 2013 it has 1,250 students and 125 staff and faculty. 99% of the students are Native Americans, mainly Navajo.

== History ==
A previous facility, with capacity for about 300 students, was constructed prior to 1966. The population of Chinle increased in the 1960s and enrollment was over 1,000 in 1986. In 1986 the federal government gave a grant to Chinle Unified School District to build a new high school building, with the grant totaling $10,000,000. The district anticipated spending $20,000,000 on a 1,500-student facility, with funds from the Apache County government and taxes being used to fund the remainder of the facility.

== Athletics ==
The school's Division III basketball teams, known as the Wildcats, play in the Wildcat Den, a large arena seating 6,000 people. It was built in 2006 at a cost of $23 million and is described by The Arizona Republic sports columnist Richard Obert as "the best high school arena in Arizona". It is also the largest building in Chinle.

It is also tied for the rank of 15th-largest high school basketball gymnasium in the United States. Before playing in the Wildcat Den, the teams played at the 1,000-seat Chinle Community Center.

== Student discipline ==
In the 21st century, this school and others in the district, have struggled with gang activity; some brought by students who had lived in large cities before coming or returning to this largely rural area of the reservation. The community has also struggled with poverty, drug and alcohol abuse, and family issues. In 2003, a display of weapons confiscated from students included baseball bats, knives, nunchucks and brass knuckles.

== Representation in other media ==
- In 2019, the docuseries Basketball or Nothing, based on the Chinle Wildcats' pursuit of a state basketball championship in the 2017–2018 season, premiered on Netflix. It was directed by Matt Howley, Michael Lucas and Gabriel Spitale. The team's second-year coach was Raul Mendoza, who had a 40-year career, led a team to a state title, and worked also as a counselor before starting here. He was profiled by The New York Times for his work. A reviewer for Decider.com concluded about this series: "STREAM IT. 'Basketball or Nothing' is sincere, heartfelt and absolutely worth your time."
- Michael Powell, a sportswriter and journalist, wrote Canyon Dreams: A Basketball Season on the Navajo Nation (2019), about the same period. He explored the importance of the high school's basketball team and games as a way that the community came together.

== Notable alumni ==
- Megalyn Echikunwoke – actress
- Tatanka Means – actor/comedian
- Nicco Montaño – MMA fighter

== See also ==
- List of high schools in Arizona
