= Tsaile, Arizona =

Tsaile, Arizona Tsééhíli (Navajo)
- Census-designated place
- Location in Apache County and the state of Arizona

- Location in Arizona Location in the United States
- Coordinates: 36°18′10″N 109°12′59″W
- Country: United States
- State: Arizona
- County: Apache

Area
  - Total: 6.10 sq mi (15.81 km^{2})
  - Land: 6.05 sq mi (15.66 km^{2})
  - Water: 0.058 sq mi (0.15 km^{2})
- Elevation: 7,051 ft (2,149 m)

Population (2020)
  - Total: 1,408
  - Density: 232.9/sq mi (89.92/km^{2})
- Time zone: UTC-7 (MST)
  - Summer (DST): UTC-6 (MDT)
- ZIP code: 86556
- Area code: 928
- FIPS code: 04-75660
- GNIS feature ID: 2409352

Tsaile is a census-designated place (CDP) in Apache County, Arizona, United States, on the Navajo Nation. The population was 1,205 at the 2010 census.

Tsaile is the home of the main campus of Diné College (formerly Navajo Community College), a tribally controlled community college. It has seven other campuses across the Navajo Nation.

Tsaile Public School (Grades K-8) is located in Tsaile. Students attend Chinle High School in Chinle, Arizona, for high school, which is about 25 miles away via Navajo Route 64.

== Geography ==
Tsaile is located approximately 29 miles (47 km) east of Chinle, just outside the boundaries of Canyon de Chelly National Monument.

According to the United States Census Bureau, the CDP has a total area of 6.0 square miles (15.5 km^{2}), of which 5.9 square miles (15.4 km^{2}) is land and 0.039 square miles (0.1 km^{2}), or 0.88%, is water.

== Demographics ==
Historical population
Census	Pop.	Note	%±
2000	1,078		—
2010	1,205		11.8%
2020	1,408		16.8%
U.S. Decennial Census

=== 2020 census ===
As of the 2020 census, Tsaile had a population of 1,408. The median age was 21.5 years. 27.3% of residents were under the age of 18 and 5.4% of residents were 65 years of age or older. For every 100 females there were 75.8 males, and for every 100 females age 18 and over there were 71.0 males age 18 and over.

0.0% of residents lived in urban areas, while 100.0% lived in rural areas.

There were 306 households in Tsaile, of which 42.5% had children under the age of 18 living in them. Of all households, 29.7% were married-couple households, 27.1% were households with a male householder and no spouse or partner present, and 35.3% were households with a female householder and no spouse or partner present. About 29.4% of all households were made up of individuals and 9.5% had someone living alone who was 65 years of age or older.

There were 365 housing units, of which 16.2% were vacant. The homeowner vacancy rate was 0.0% and the rental vacancy rate was 0.5%.

Racial composition as of the 2020 census
Race	Number	Percent
White	357	25.4%
Black or African American	3	0.2%
American Indian and Alaska Native	984	69.9%
Asian	10	0.7%
Native Hawaiian and Other Pacific Islander	0	0.0%
Some other race	17	1.2%
Two or more races	37	2.6%
Hispanic or Latino (of any race)	90	6.4%

=== 2000 census ===
As of the 2000 census, there were 1,078 people, 244 households, and 200 families residing in the CDP. The population density was 179.5 inhabitants per square mile (69.3/km^{2}). There were 345 housing units at an average density of 57.4 per square mile (22.2/km^{2}). The racial makeup of the CDP was 93.3% Native American, 3.6% White, 0.1% Black or African American, 0.1% Asian, 0.1% Pacific Islander, 0.7% from other races, and 2.1% from two or more races. 1.3% of the population were Hispanic or Latino of any race.

There were 244 households, out of which 55.3% had children under the age of 18 living with them, 50.4% were married couples living together, 27.5% had a female householder with no husband present, and 18.0% were non-families. 16.8% of all households were made up of individuals, and 3.7% had someone living alone who was 65 years of age or older. The average household size was 3.98 and the average family size was 4.57.

In the CDP, the age distribution of the population shows 38.8% under the age of 18, 19.5% from 18 to 24, 24.1% from 25 to 44, 14.8% from 45 to 64, and 2.8% who were 65 years of age or older. The median age was 22 years. For every 100 females, there were 88.8 males. For every 100 females age 18 and over, there were 87.0 males.

The median income for a household in the CDP was $17,500, and the median income for a family was $16,513. Males had a median income of $35,469 versus $21,818 for females. The per capita income for the CDP was $6,259. About 59.7% of families and 63.2% of the population were below the poverty line, including 72.3% of those under age 18 and 70.0% of those age 65 or over.

== Education ==
The area is served by Chinle Unified School District#24.

Tsaile Elementary School is located in Tsaile. Residents go to schools in Chinle for middle and high school, including Chinle High School.

Tsaile is the home of the main campus of Diné College (formerly Navajo Community College), a tribally controlled community college with seven other campuses across the Navajo Nation.
