= Apache County, Arizona =

County in Arizona, United States

- County
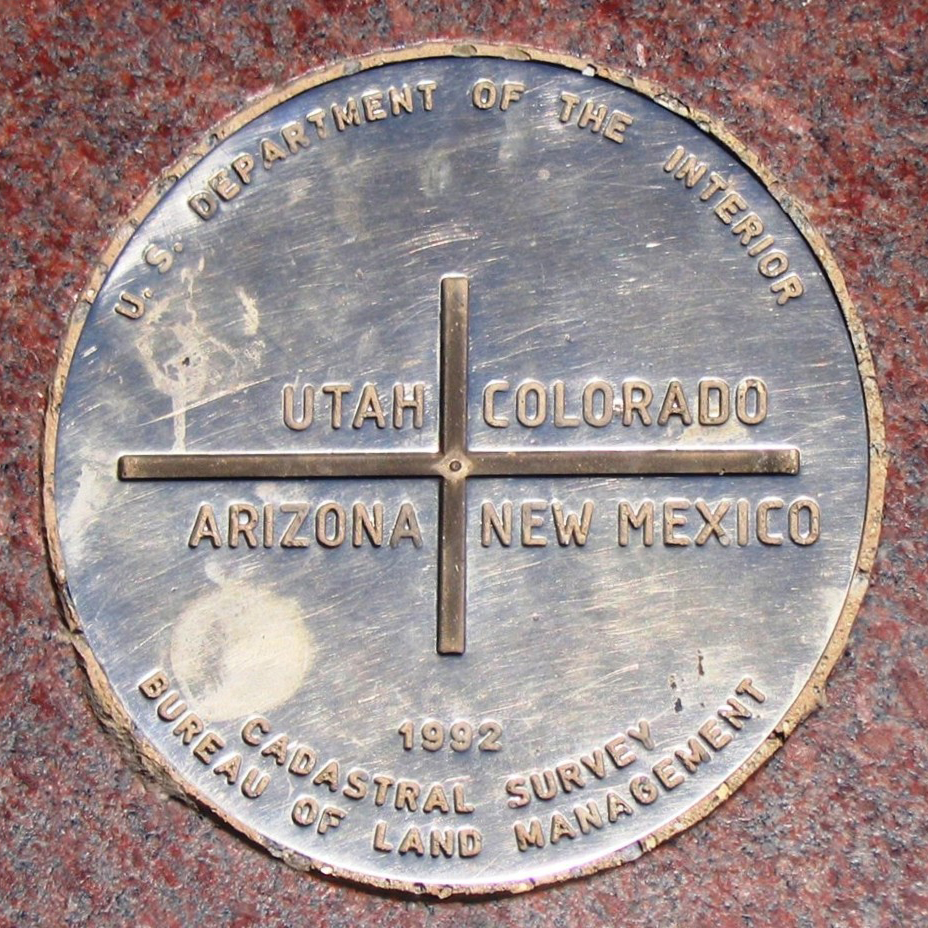
- Apache County includes the Arizona section of the Four Corners Monument.

- Seal

- Location within the U.S. state of Arizona
- Coordinates: 35°25′26″N 109°26′33″W
- Country: United States
- State: Arizona
- Founded: February 24, 1879
- Named for: Apache people
- Seat: St. Johns
- Largest town: Eagar

Area
  - Total: 11,218 sq mi (29,050 km^{2})
  - Land: 11,198 sq mi (29,000 km^{2})
  - Water: 21 sq mi (54 km^{2}) 0.2%

Population (2020)
  - Total: 66,021
  - Estimate (2025): 64,445 ▼
  - Density: 5.8958/sq mi (2.2764/km^{2})
- Time zone: UTC−7 (Mountain)
- Congressional district: 2nd
- Website: www.apachecountyaz.gov

Apache County is a county (Arizona list) in the northeast corner of the U.S. state of Arizona. Shaped in a long rectangle running north to south, as of the 2020 census, its population was 66,021. The county seat is St. Johns.

Most of the county is occupied by part of the federally recognized Navajo Nation and the Fort Apache Indian Reservation.

== History ==
The United States acquired this territory following its victory in the Mexican–American War in 1848. It was originally part of the New Mexico Territory established at the time. In 1863, during the American Civil War, Congress established the Arizona Territory to improve regional administration. It operated until 1912 when it was admitted as a state.

In 1879 the Tenth Territorial Legislature organized Apache County from the eastern section of Yavapai County; officially all land east of 109°45′ W was included in the new county. As population increased in the area, by 1895, the legislature divided this county to create Navajo County and assigned some of the lands to the newly organized Graham, Greenlee and Gila counties. The county seat was first designated as the town of Snowflake, but a year later it was moved to St. Johns. From 1880 to 1882, the county seat was temporarily in Springerville, before being returned to St. Johns.

An 1896 history of the area described the county by the following:

Apache County was created in 1879 and lies in the northeastern corner of the Territory. Until March, 1895, it also embraced what is now Navajo County, but at that date the latter was set apart and established as a separate county. Apache County is justly noted for its great natural resources and advantages. It is destined some day in the early future to have a large agricultural population. Now, immense herds of cattle and flocks of sheep roam over its broad mesas and its fertile valleys. The Navajo Indians occupy the northern part of the county-in fact, occupy much of the remainder of the county, as they refuse to remain on their reservation, preferring to drive their sheep and cattle on lands outside their reservation, where the grazing is better. The southern part is a fine grazing country, while the northern part is cut up into picturesque gorges and canyons by the floods of past centuries.

In the late 1880s, the county sheriff was Commodore Perry Owens, a legendary Old West gunfighter. At that time, the county covered more than 21,177 square miles (54,850 km^{2}) in territory. In September 1887, near Holbrook, in what is now Navajo County, Owens was involved in a famous gunfight: he killed three men and wounded a fourth while serving a warrant on outlaw Andy Blevins/Andy Cooper, a participant in a raging range war, later dubbed the Pleasant Valley War.

In 2015, Apache County had the highest rate of deaths due to motor vehicles in the United States, with 82.5 deaths per 100,000 people.

The Fort Apache Indian Reservation occupies part of the county, as does the Navajo Nation, whose territory extends well beyond it. The Apache and Navajo Nation are federally recognized tribes that long occupied territory here.

== Geography ==
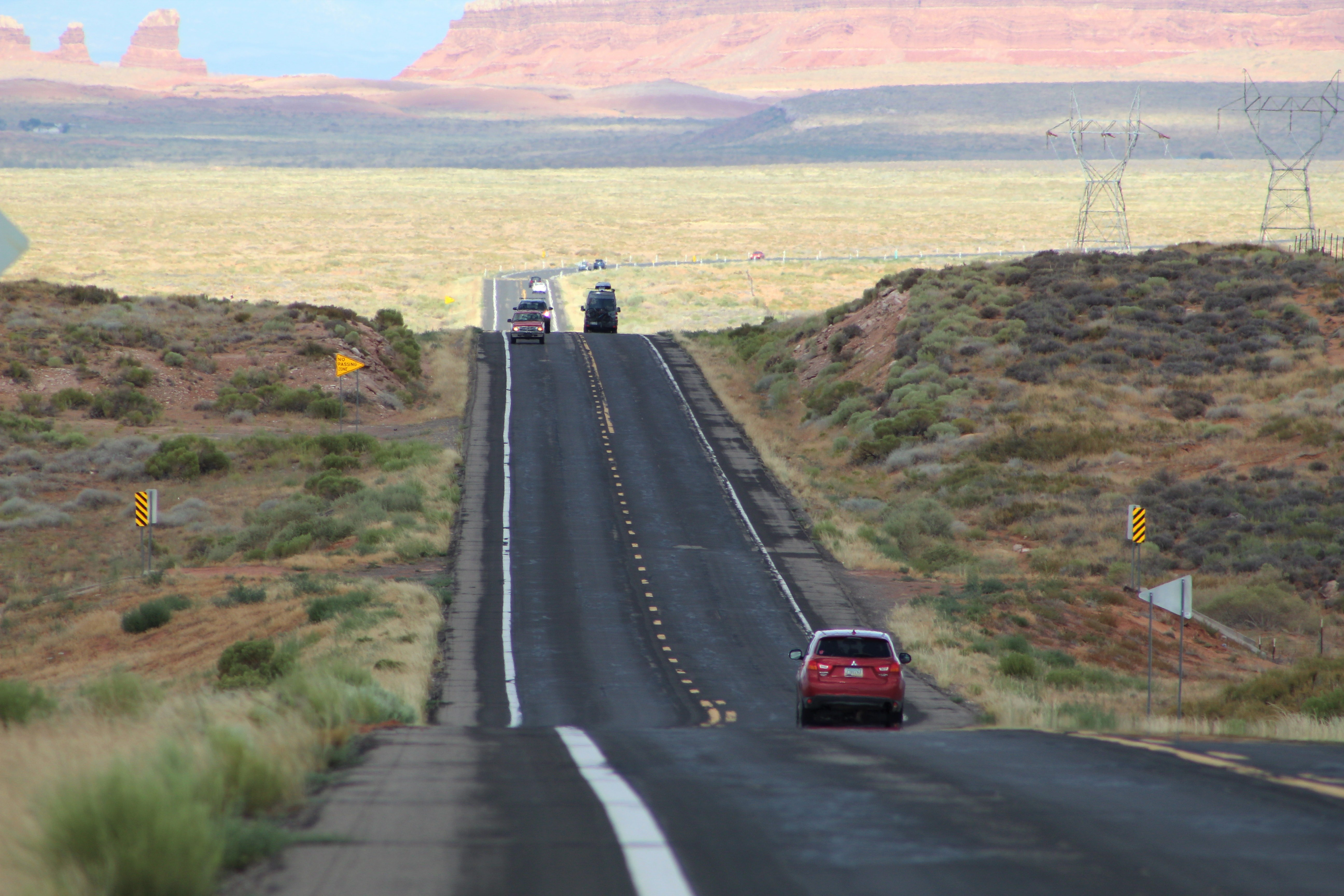
Apache County, Arizona.

According to the United States Census Bureau, the county has a total area of 11,218 square miles (29,050 km^{2}), of which 11,198 square miles (29,000 km^{2}) is land and 21 square miles (54 km^{2}) (0.2%) is water. The county is the third-largest county by area in Arizona and the sixth-largest in the United States (excluding boroughs and census areas in Alaska).

Apache County contains parts of each of the Navajo Indian Reservation and the Fort Apache Indian Reservation, and landholdings of the Zuni Indian Reservation that are not contiguous to their main territory. It also contains part of Petrified Forest National Park. Canyon de Chelly National Monument is entirely within the county and within the boundaries of the Navajo Nation.

=== Adjacent counties ===
- Greenlee County – south
- Graham County – south
- Navajo County – west
- Montezuma County, Colorado – northeast
- San Juan County, Utah – north
- San Juan County, New Mexico – east
- McKinley County, New Mexico – east
- Cibola County, New Mexico – east
- Catron County, New Mexico – east

Apache County is one of three U.S. counties (the others being Wayne County, West Virginia and Cook County, Illinois) to border two counties of the same name, neither of which is in the same state as the county itself (San Juan County, Utah and San Juan County, New Mexico).

=== Indian reservations ===
Apache County has the most land designated as Indian reservation of any county in the United States. (Coconino County and Navajo County are a close second and third.) The county has 19,857.34 km^{2} (7,666.96 sq mi) of reservation territory, or 68.34 percent of its total area. The reservations are, in descending order of area within the county, the Navajo Nation, the Fort Apache Indian Reservation, and the Zuni Indian Reservation, all of which are partly located within the county.

=== National protected areas ===
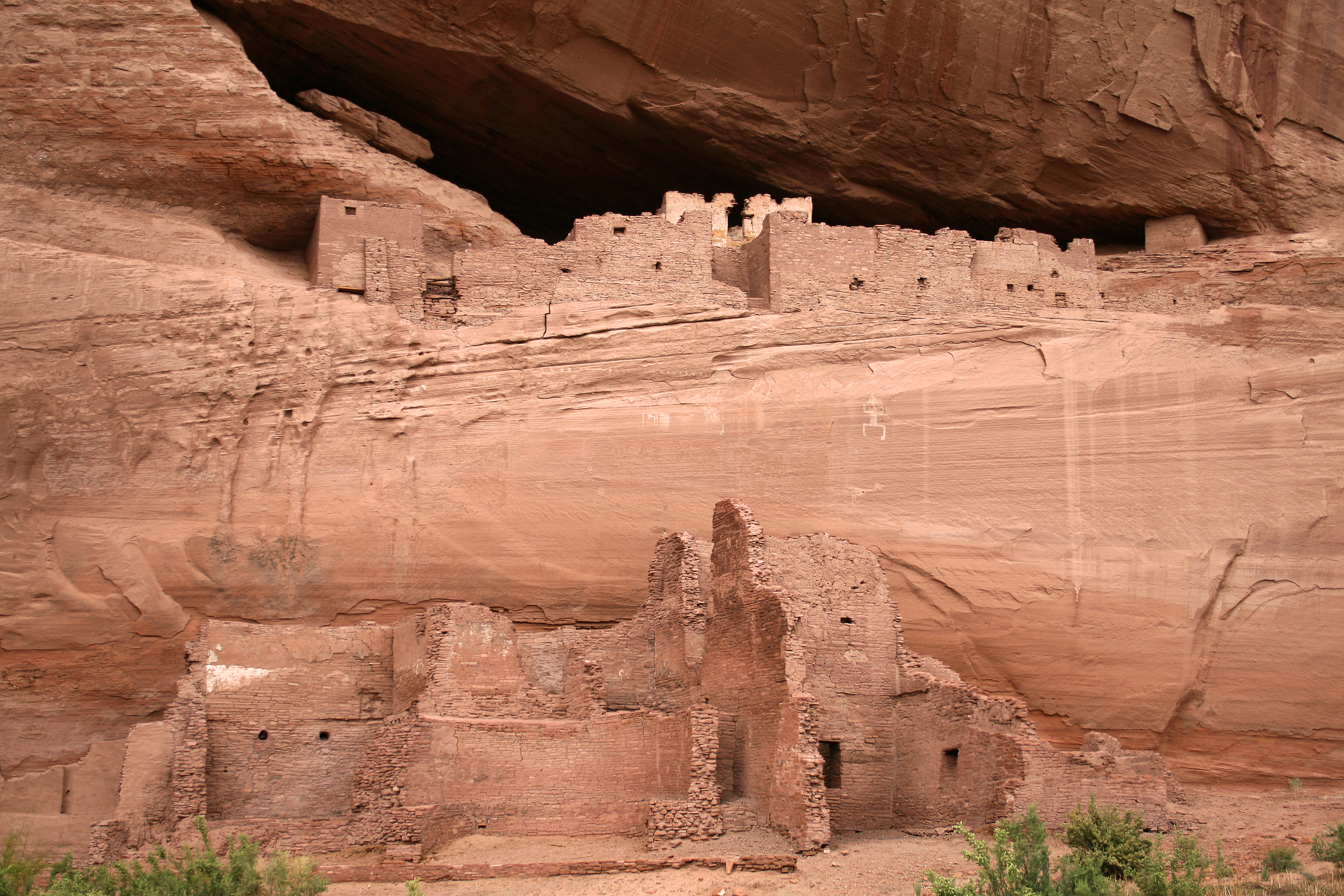
White House Ruin at Canyon de Chelly National Monument

- Apache-Sitgreaves National Forest (part)
- Canyon de Chelly National Monument
- Hubbell Trading Post National Historic Site
- Petrified Forest National Park (part)

== Demographics ==
Historical population
Census	Pop.	Note	%±
1880	5,283		—
1890	4,281		−19.0%
1900	8,297		93.8%
1910	9,196		10.8%
1920	13,196		43.5%
1930	17,765		34.6%
1940	24,095		35.6%
1950	27,767		15.2%
1960	30,438		9.6%
1970	32,298		6.1%
1980	52,108		61.3%
1990	61,591		18.2%
2000	69,423		12.7%
2010	71,518		3.0%
2020	66,021		−7.7%
2025 (est.)	64,445	▼	−2.4%
U.S. Decennial Census; 1790–1960 1900–1990; 1990–2000 2010–2020

=== Racial and ethnic composition ===
Apache County, Arizona – Racial and ethnic composition Note: the US Census treats Hispanic/Latino as an ethnic category. This table excludes Latinos from the racial categories and assigns them to a separate category. Hispanics/Latinos may be of any race.
Race / Ethnicity (NH = Non-Hispanic)	2020	2010	2000	1990	1980
White alone (NH)	20.9% (13,791)	20.4% (14,568)	17.7% (12,281)	18.4% (11,354)	20.9% (10,909)
Black alone (NH)	0.3% (184)	0.2% (157)	0.2% (163)	0.2% (98)	0.5% (279)
American Indian alone (NH)	70.5% (46,509)	71.8% (51,360)	76.4% (53,036)	77% (47,425)	74.8% (38,987)
Asian alone (NH)	0.5% (307)	0.3% (185)	0.1% (85)	0.1% (86)	0.1% (37)
Pacific Islander alone (NH)	0% (18)	0% (24)	0% (30)		
Other race alone (NH)	0.2% (115)	0% (27)	0% (31)	0% (29)	0.1% (43)
Multiracial (NH)	1.9% (1,236)	1.5% (1,084)	1% (678)	—	—
Hispanic/Latino (any race)	5.9% (3,861)	5.8% (4,113)	4.5% (3,119)	4.2% (2,599)	3.6% (1,853)

=== American Community Survey 2025 data ===
The United States Census Bureau estimated that in 2025, Apache County’s population was 64.445. It was also estimated that the county's population was 20,78% Non-Hispanic White, 7,40% Hispanic or Latino, 0,57% Non-Hispanic Black, 0,82% Asian, 68,50% Native American, 0,07% Pacific Islander, and 1,86% Multiracial.

Total	Population	Percentage
Non-Hispanic White	13.393	20,78%
Hispanic or Latino	4.772	7,40%
Non-Hispanic Black	367	0,57%
Asian	528	0,82%
Native American	44.147	68,50%
Pacific Islander	42	0,07%
Non-Hispanic Multiracial	1.196	1,86%

The most reported ancestries in 2020 were Navajo (64%), English (5.9%), Mexican (4.4%), German (3.3%), Irish (2.9%), and Scottish (1.1%).

=== 2020 census ===
As of the 2020 census, the county had a population of 66,021. Of the residents, 25.6% were under the age of 18 and 18.0% were 65 years of age or older; the median age was 38.3 years. For every 100 females there were 98.7 males, and for every 100 females age 18 and over there were 97.0 males. 0.0% of residents lived in urban areas and 100.0% lived in rural areas.

The racial makeup of the county was 22.5% White, 0.3% Black or African American, 71.2% American Indian and Alaska Native, 0.5% Asian, 0.0% Native Hawaiian and Pacific Islander, 1.9% from some other race, and 3.6% from two or more races. Hispanic or Latino residents of any race comprised 5.8% of the population.

There were 22,103 households in the county, of which 34.5% had children under the age of 18 living with them and 32.6% had a female householder with no spouse or partner present. About 26.4% of all households were made up of individuals and 11.2% had someone living alone who was 65 years of age or older.

There were 28,723 housing units, of which 23.0% were vacant. Among occupied housing units, 73.2% were owner-occupied and 26.8% were renter-occupied. The homeowner vacancy rate was 1.3% and the rental vacancy rate was 6.2%.

=== 2010 census ===
As of the census of 2010, there were 71,518 people, 22,771 households, and 16,331 families residing in the county. The population density was 6.4 inhabitants per square mile (2.5 inhabitants/km^{2}). There were 32,514 housing units at an average density of 2.9 units per square mile (1.1 units/km^{2}). The racial makeup of the county was 72.9% Native American, 23.3% white, 0.3% Asian, 0.2% black or African American, 1.3% from other races, and 2.0% from two or more races. Those of Hispanic or Latino origin made up 5.8% of the population.

The largest ancestry groups were:

- 69.6% Navajo
- 5.4% English
- 5.3% German
- 4.2% Irish
- 4.0% Mexican
- 1.4% American
- 1.1% Scottish
- 1.0% French
- 1.0% Polish

Of the 22,771 households, 42.3% had children under the age of 18 living with them, 42.8% were married couples living together, 21.2% had a female householder with no husband present, 28.3% were non-families, and 24.8% of all households were made up of individuals. The average household size was 3.10 and the average family size was 3.76. The median age was 32.4 years.

The median income for a household in the county was $30,184 and the median income for a family was $36,915. Males had a median income of $38,451 versus $31,557 for females. The per capita income for the county was $12,294. About 26.9% of families and 34.4% of the population were below the poverty line, including 41.8% of those under age 18 and 29.2% of those age 65 or over.

=== 2000 census ===
As of the census of 2000, there were 69,423 people, 19,971 households, and 15,257 families residing in the county. The population density was 6 people per square mile (2.3 people/km^{2}). There were 31,621 housing units at an average density of 3 units per square mile (1.2 units/km^{2}). The racial makeup of the county was 76.9% Native American, 19.5% White, 0.3% Black or African American, 0.1% Asian, 0.1% Pacific Islander, 1.8% from other races, and 1.4% from two or more races. 4.5% of the population were Hispanic or Latino of any race. 58.4% reported speaking Navajo at home, while 38.4% speak English and 2.7% Spanish.

There were 19,971 households, out of which 43.8% had children under the age of 18 living with them, 49.3% were married couples living together, 21.4% had a female householder with no husband present, and 23.6% were non-families. 21.2% of all households were made up of individuals, and 6.9% had someone living alone who was 65 years of age or older. The average household size was 3.41 and the average family size was 4.04.

In the county, the population was spread out, with 38.5% under the age of 18, 9.4% from 18 to 24, 25.1% from 25 to 44, 18.7% from 45 to 64, and 8.0% who were 65 years of age or older. The median age was 27 years. For every 100 females there were 98.20 males. For every 100 females age 18 and over, there were 94.50 males.

The median income for a household in the county was $23,344, and the median income for a family was $26,315. Males had a median income of $30,182 versus $22,312 for females. The per capita income for the county was $8,986. About 33.5% of families and 37.8% of the population were below the poverty line, including 42.8% of those under age 18 and 36.5% of those age 65 or over. The county's per-capita income makes it one of the poorest counties in the United States.

Apache County is one of only 38 county-level census divisions of the United States where the most spoken language is not English and one of only 3 where it is neither English nor Spanish. 58.3% of the population speak Navajo at home, followed by English at 38.3% and Spanish at 2.7%.

In 2000, the largest denominational group was the Catholics (with 19,965 adherents). The largest religious bodies were The Catholic Church (with 19,965 members) and the Church of Jesus Christ of Latter-day Saints (with 8,947 members).

== Politics ==
Apache County has been a Democratic stronghold for over 40 years; prior to this, it was a swing county. The Navajo Nation, as well as part of the Fort Apache Reservation, both lie within the county and traditionally support Democratic candidates, overruling St. Johns, Springerville-Eagar, and Alpine which are all Republican-leaning. No Republican presidential nominee has won Apache County since Ronald Reagan in 1980, when incumbent President Jimmy Carter was viewed as extremely weak on issues pertaining to the West, especially water development. During most of the 1980s, 1990s and early 2000s, Apache was the most Democratic county in Arizona. In 2024, however, Apache County shifted heavily to the right alongside most other majority Native American counties in the country. The strongest Republican trends in the county lay in the Navajo and Fort Apache Reservations, which in some areas shifted by as much as 10 percentage points. After failing to narrow his margin in 2020, Donald Trump achieved the best result for a Republican since 1984, holding the Democrat's vote share below 60% for the first time since that same year and cutting his margin of loss nearly in half.

United States presidential election results for Apache County, Arizona
Year	Republican		Democratic		Third party(ies)	
Year	No.	%	No.	%	No.	%
1912	56	21.96%	108	42.35%	91	35.69%
1916	311	31.73%	648	66.12%	21	2.14%
1920	679	52.35%	618	47.65%	0	0.00%
1924	620	48.51%	548	42.88%	110	8.61%
1928	837	51.41%	791	48.59%	0	0.00%
1932	760	37.36%	1,271	62.49%	3	0.15%
1936	638	27.42%	1,674	71.94%	15	0.64%
1940	926	31.95%	1,969	67.94%	3	0.10%
1944	728	36.99%	1,238	62.91%	2	0.10%
1948	970	39.51%	1,480	60.29%	5	0.20%
1952	1,767	59.70%	1,193	40.30%	0	0.00%
1956	1,685	63.18%	981	36.78%	1	0.04%
1960	1,568	51.75%	1,459	48.15%	3	0.10%
1964	1,849	47.51%	2,042	52.47%	1	0.03%
1968	2,092	49.83%	1,668	39.73%	438	10.43%
1972	3,394	50.28%	3,145	46.59%	211	3.13%
1976	3,447	33.38%	6,583	63.75%	297	2.88%
1980	5,991	56.55%	3,917	36.97%	687	6.48%
1984	5,638	43.26%	7,277	55.84%	117	0.90%
1988	5,347	36.76%	8,944	61.50%	253	1.74%
1992	4,588	25.13%	11,218	61.44%	2,452	13.43%
1996	4,761	25.48%	12,394	66.33%	1,529	8.18%
2000	5,947	30.57%	13,025	66.95%	484	2.49%
2004	8,384	34.65%	15,658	64.71%	156	0.64%
2008	8,551	35.11%	15,390	63.19%	414	1.70%
2012	8,250	31.83%	17,147	66.16%	520	2.01%
2016	8,240	29.79%	17,083	61.76%	2,338	8.45%
2020	11,442	32.52%	23,293	66.21%	448	1.27%
2024	12,795	39.96%	18,872	58.93%	356	1.11%

== Education ==
=== Primary and secondary schools ===
The following school districts serve Apache County:

- Alpine Elementary School District
- Chinle Unified School District
- Concho Elementary School District
- Ganado Unified School District
- McNary Elementary School District
- Red Mesa Unified School District
- Round Valley Unified School District
- Sanders Unified School District
- St. Johns Unified School District
- Vernon Elementary School District
- Window Rock Unified School District

In addition several other schools, including charter schools and tribal schools operated by or affiliated with the Bureau of Indian Education (BIE), serve the county.

- Many Farms High School (BIE-operated)
- Many Farms Community School
- Hunters Point Boarding School

Charter schools:

- New Visions Academy

Private schools:

- St. Michael Indian School (Roman Catholic Diocese of Gallup)

=== Public libraries ===
The Apache County Library District, headquartered in St. Johns, operates public libraries in the county. The branches include Alpine Public Library (unincorporated area), Concho Public Library (unincorporated area), Greer Memorial Library (unincorporated area), Round Valley Public Library (Eagar), Sanders Public Library (unincorporated area), St. Johns Public Library (St. Johns), and Vernon Public Library (unincorporated area).

The Navajo Nation Museum and Library is located in Window Rock. The library and museum is the largest one on the Navajo Nation and in Apache County.

== Transportation ==
=== Major highways ===
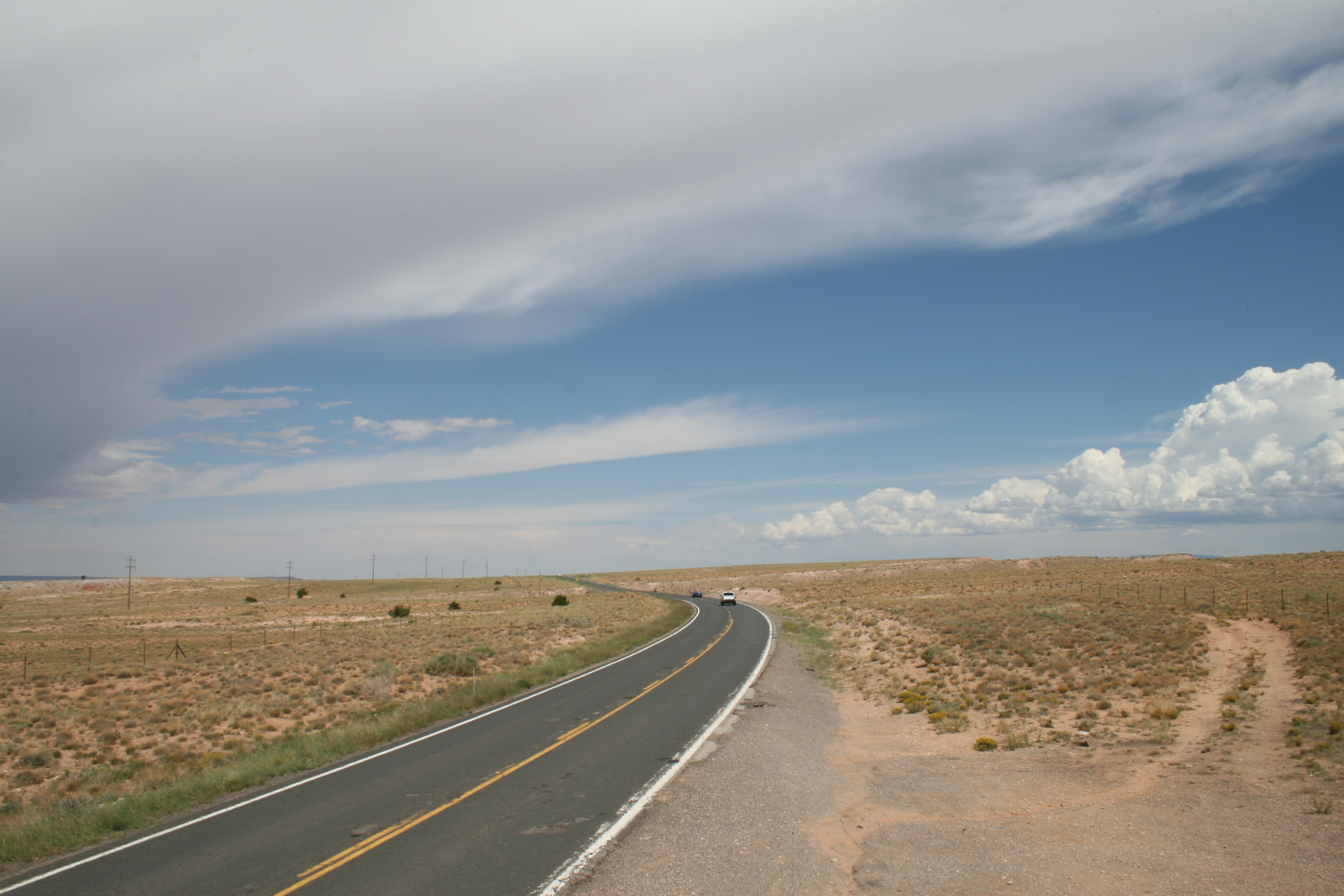
U.S. Route 191 crossing the Beautiful Valley in Apache County

- Interstate 40
- U.S. Route 60
- U.S. Route 64
- U.S. Route 160
- U.S. Route 180
  - State Route 180A
- U.S. Route 191
- State Route 61
- State Route 260
- State Route 261
- State Route 264
- State Route 273
- State Route 373

=== Airports ===
The following public use airports are located in Apache County:

- Chinle – Chinle Municipal Airport (E91)
- Springerville – Springerville Municipal Airport (D68)
- St. Johns – St. Johns Industrial Air Park (SJN)
- Window Rock – Window Rock Airport (RQE)

== Communities ==
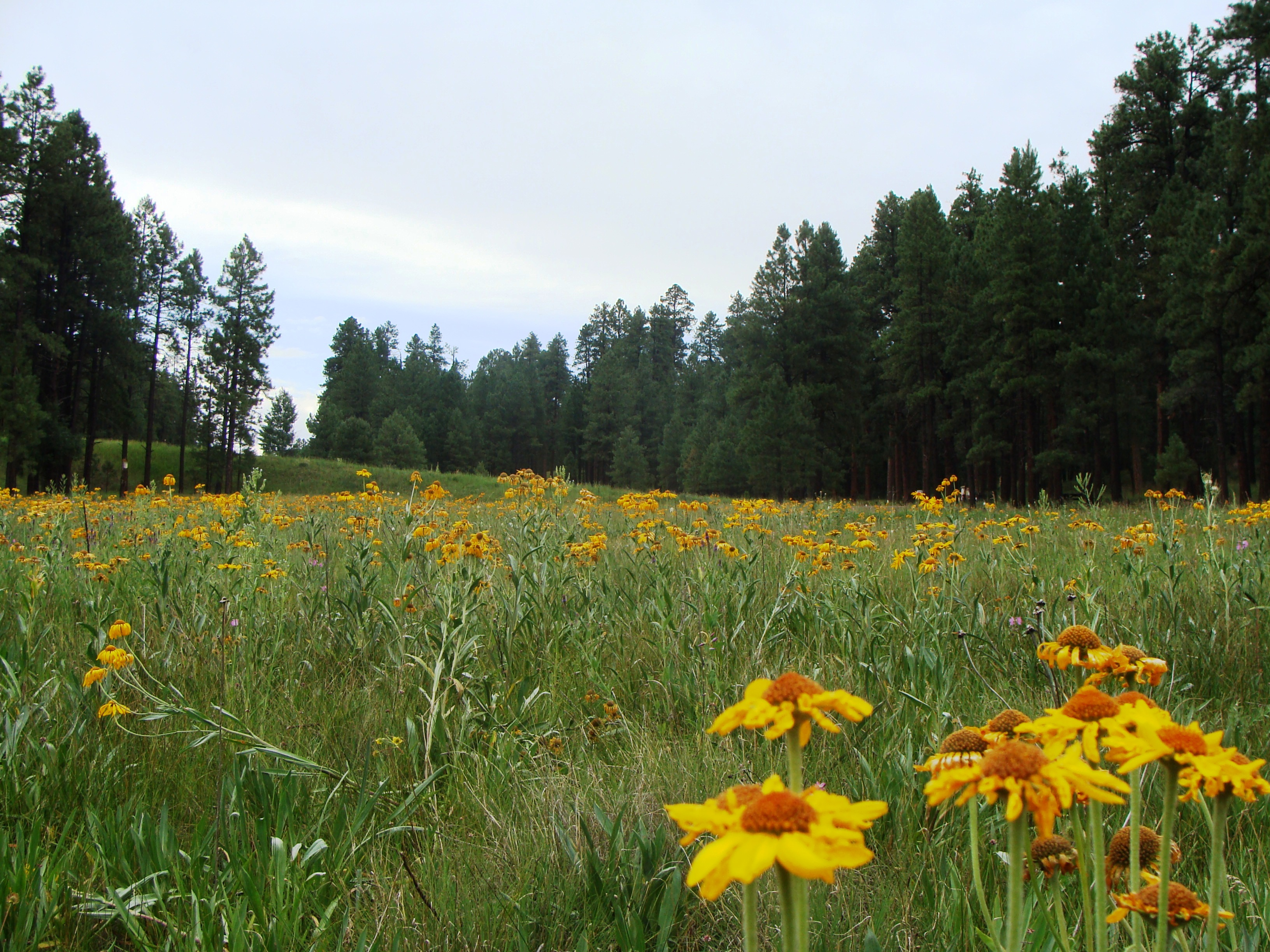
Wildflower meadow in the Apache-Sitgreaves National Forest, near Alpine.

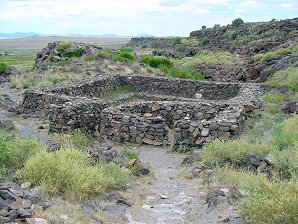
Kiva at Casa Malpais, near Springerville.

=== City ===
- St. Johns (county seat)

=== Towns ===
- Eagar
- Springerville

=== Census-designated places ===
- Alpine
- Burnside
- Chinle
- Concho
- Cornfields
- Del Muerto
- Dennehotso
- Fort Defiance
- Ganado
- Greer
- Houck
- Klagetoh
- Lukachukai
- Lupton
- Many Farms
- McNary
- Nazlini
- Nutrioso
- Oak Springs
- Red Mesa
- Red Rock
- Rock Point
- Rough Rock
- Round Rock
- St. Michaels
- Sanders
- Sawmill
- Sehili
- Steamboat
- Teec Nos Pos
- Toyei
- Tsaile
- Vernon
- Wide Ruins
- Window Rock

=== Unincorporated communities ===
- Adamana
- Blue Gap
- Chambers
- Hunters Point
- Mexican Water
- Navajo Springs
- White Clay

=== County population ranking ===
The population ranking of the following table is based on the 2010 census of Apache County.

† county seat

Rank	City/Town/etc.	Population (2010 Census)	Municipal type	Incorporated
1	Eagar	4,885	Town	1948
2	Chinle	4,518	CDP	
3	Fort Defiance	3,624	CDP	
4	† St. Johns	3,480	City	1879
5	Window Rock	2,712	CDP	
6	Springerville	1,961	Town	1948
7	Lukachukai	1,701	CDP	
8	St. Michaels	1,443	CDP	
9	Many Farms	1,348	CDP	
10	Ganado	1,210	CDP	
11	Tsaile	1,205	CDP	
12	Houck	1,024	CDP	
13	Round Rock	789	CDP	
14	Sawmill	748	CDP	
15	Dennehotso	746	CDP	
16	Teec Nos Pos	730	CDP	
17	Rock Point	642	CDP	
18	Sanders	630	CDP	
19	Burnside	537	CDP	
20	McNary	528	CDP	
21	Nazlini	489	CDP	
22	Red Mesa	480	CDP	
23	Rough Rock	414	CDP	
24	Del Muerto	329	CDP	
25	Steamboat	284	CDP	
26	Cornfields	255	CDP	
27	Klagetoh	242	CDP	
28	Cottonwood	226	CDP	
29	Wide Ruins	176	CDP	
30	Red Rock	169	CDP	
31	Alpine	145	CDP	
32	Sehili	135	CDP	
33	Vernon	122	CDP	
34	Oak Springs	63	CDP	
35	Greer	41	CDP	
36	Concho	38	CDP	
37	Nutrioso	26	CDP	
38	Lupton	25	CDP	
39	Toyei	13	CDP	

== Notable people ==
- Berard Haile
- Cormac Antram
- Don Lorenzo Hubbell
- Anselm Weber
- Rex E. Lee
- David King Udall
- Ida Hunt Udall
- Mo Udall
- Stewart Udall
- William Cooper
- John Wayne
- Henry Chee Dodge
- Joe Shirley Jr.
- Annie Dodge Wauneka

== See also ==
- National Register of Historic Places listings in Apache County, Arizona
- List of counties in Arizona
