= Round Rock, Arizona =

CDP in Apache County, Arizona

Round Rock, Arizona Tsé Nikání (Navajo)
- Census-designated place
- Location in Apache County and the state of Arizona

- Location in the United States
- Coordinates: 36°30′16″N 109°27′42″W
- Country: United States
- State: Arizona
- County: Apache

Area
  - Total: 14.35 sq mi (37.16 km^{2})
  - Land: 14.25 sq mi (36.91 km^{2})
  - Water: 0.097 sq mi (0.25 km^{2})
- Elevation: 5,407 ft (1,648 m)

Population (2020)
  - Total: 640
  - Density: 44.9/sq mi (17.34/km^{2})
- Time zone: UTC-7 (MST)
- ZIP code: 86547
- Area code: 928
- FIPS code: 04-61440
- GNIS feature ID: 2409217

Round Rock (Navajo: Tsé Nikání) is a Navajo community and census-designated place (CDP) in Apache County, Arizona, United States. The population was 789 at the 2010 census. It is named after Round Rock, a nearby mesa.

== Geography ==
According to the United States Census Bureau, the CDP has a total area of 14.4 square miles (37.2 km^{2}), of which 14.2 square miles (36.9 km^{2}) is land and 0.12 square miles (0.3 km^{2}), or 0.68%, is water.

== Demographics ==
Historical population
| Census | Pop. | Note | %± |
|---|---|---|---|
| 2000 | 601 | | — |
| 2010 | 789 | | 31.3% |
| 2020 | 640 | | −18.9% |
U.S. Decennial Census

As of the census of 2000, there were 601 people, 144 households, and 127 families living in the CDP. The population density was 42.7 inhabitants per square mile (16.5/km^{2}). There were 242 housing units at an average density of 17.2 per square mile (6.6/km^{2}). The racial makeup of the CDP was 99.7% Native American, with 0.3% White and other races. 0.2% of the population were Hispanic or Latino of any race.

There were 144 households, out of which 56.9% had children under the age of 18 living with them, 54.9% were married couples living together, 29.2% had a female householder with no husband present, and 11.8% were non-families. 10.4% of all households were made up of individuals, and 4.9% had someone living alone who was 65 years of age or older. The average household size was 4.2 and the average family size was 4.6.

In the CDP, the age distribution of the population shows 44.3% under the age of 18, 12.1% from 18 to 24, 23.0% from 25 to 44, 13.6% from 45 to 64, and 7.0% who were 65 years of age or older. The median age was 21 years. For every 100 females, there were 94.5 males. For every 100 females age 18 and over, there were 81.1 males.

The median income for a household in the CDP was $16,328, and the median income for a family was $20,833. Males had a median income of $31,250 versus $21,250 for females. The per capita income for the CDP was $4,688. About 51.9% of families and 57.1% of the population were below the poverty line, including 48.7% of those under age 18 and 64.7% of those age 65 or over.

== Education ==
Almost all of the CDP is a part of the Red Mesa Unified School District, which operates Round Rock K–8 School and Red Mesa High School. Round Rock Elementary/Junior High is located on the Navajo Reservation right off of Arizona State Highway 191. A small portion is within the Chinle Unified School District, which operates Chinle High School.

Originally all of the territory was within the Chinle School District. In July 1983 the Red Mesa Unified School District formed, splitting from the Chinle School District.
