= Chinle, Arizona =

Chinle, Arizona Chʼíńlį́ (Navajo)
- Census-designated place
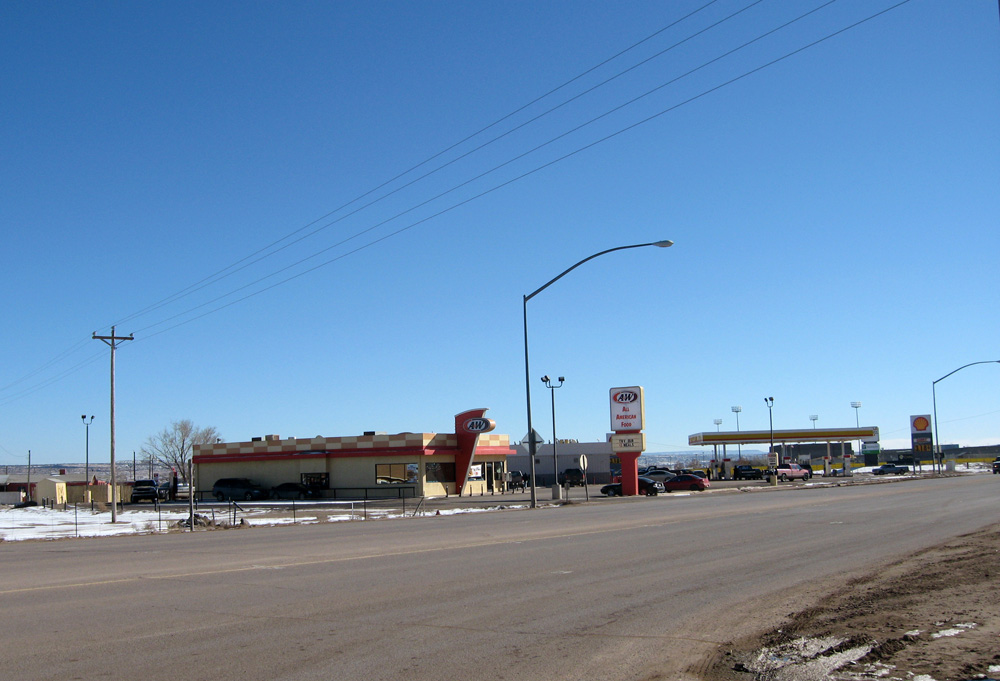

- Location in Apache County and Arizona

- Location in Arizona Location in the United States
- Coordinates: 36°09′02″N 109°34′47″W
- Country: United States
- State: Arizona
- County: Apache

Area
  - Total: 16.32 sq mi (42.26 km^{2})
  - Land: 16.29 sq mi (42.19 km^{2})
  - Water: 0.023 sq mi (0.06 km^{2})
- Elevation: 5,506 ft (1,678 m)

Population (2020)
  - Total: 4,573
  - Density: 280.7/sq mi (108.38/km^{2})
- Time zone: UTC-7 (MST)
  - Summer (DST): UTC-6 (MDT)
- ZIP codes: 86503
- Area code: 928
- FIPS code: 04-12770
- GNIS feature ID: 2408029

Chinle (Navajo: Chʼíńlį́) is a census-designated place (CDP) in Apache County, Arizona, United States. The name in Navajo means 'flowing out' and is a reference to the location where the water flows out of the Canyon de Chelly. The population was 4,518 at the 2010 census.

== History ==
In the Spanish colonial period, Chinle was a base for both trade and war. After acquisition of this area by the United States following the Mexican–American War, relations between the peoples deteriorated in the 1860s.

The United States conducted a peace conference through their representative Kit Carson and the Navajo people in order to end the war between the Navajo and the U.S. The first trading post operated out of a tent and was established here in 1882. By 1885 a full-sized camp had developed.

The Chinle Boarding School was established in 1910 by the Bureau of Indian Affairs (BIA). Khalil Anthony Johnson Jr., a PhD candidate at Yale University, wrote an article in 2014 that said, with this school, the federal government "established a permanent presence in [Chinle]", and that the BIA "effectively governed the town thereafter."

Initially anglicized as Chin Lee, the spelling of the name was changed to Chinle on April 1, 1941.

Chinle serves as a gateway community for Canyon de Chelly National Monument. The monument was established in 1931 primarily to preserve the archaeological sites and record of ancient human history. Canyon de Chelly is unique among the National Park Service units because the park is located entirely on Navajo tribal land, and it has a residential community in the canyon.

In the 1950s Chinle had a population with a variety of ethnicities, who tended to settle in separate areas. In addition to Navajo and non-Navajo Native Americans, there were Anglo white and Black people, and some of other races. The total population was under 200. Employees of the Bureau of Indian Affairs (BIA), one of the major employers, and school employees lived in their own compounds. The Chinle Boarding School and a public health clinic were the other two major employers.

By the 1950s the community had an issue with numerous stray dogs, who were not neutered nor spayed. Chinle had no leash law. On April 8, 1956, BIA authorities rounded up and shot stray dogs without warning, leaving some remains at people's doorsteps. The community protested when another dog shooting was ordered on September 23, 1956. G. Warren Spaulding, the General Superintendent of the Navajo Agency, ordered the dog shot anyway, and did not notify the residents of his reason for rejecting their protest. Community outcry led to the installation of a gas chamber to euthanize unclaimed dogs.

Chinle's population was 150 in the 1960 census.

In 2019, the television series Basketball or Nothing, featuring Chinle High School's basketball team, premiered on Netflix.

Gabrielle Durcharme of Cronkite News stated that the COVID-19 pandemic in Arizona "was hard on the community."

== Geography ==
According to the United States Census Bureau, the CDP has a total area of 16.1 square miles (41.6 km^{2}), of which 16.0 square miles (41.5 km^{2}) is land and 0.04 square miles (0.1 km^{2}), or 0.16%, is water.

=== Climate ===
Chinle has a cold semi-arid climate, BSk in the Köppen Climate Classification.

Climate data for Chinle, Arizona (Canyon de Chelly, 1991–2020 normals, extremes 1908–present)
| Month | Jan | Feb | Mar | Apr | May | Jun | Jul | Aug | Sep | Oct | Nov | Dec | Year |
|---|---|---|---|---|---|---|---|---|---|---|---|---|---|
| Record high °F (°C) | 70 (21) | 72 (22) | 85 (29) | 90 (32) | 101 (38) | 105 (41) | 105 (41) | 102 (39) | 99 (37) | 90 (32) | 79 (26) | 68 (20) | 105 (41) |
| Mean maximum °F (°C) | 57.3 (14.1) | 64.1 (17.8) | 74.6 (23.7) | 82.6 (28.1) | 91.3 (32.9) | 99.4 (37.4) | 100.9 (38.3) | 96.9 (36.1) | 92.4 (33.6) | 83.4 (28.6) | 69.8 (21.0) | 58.8 (14.9) | 101.8 (38.8) |
| Mean daily maximum °F (°C) | 43.8 (6.6) | 50.6 (10.3) | 60.7 (15.9) | 68.9 (20.5) | 79.0 (26.1) | 90.0 (32.2) | 92.9 (33.8) | 89.7 (32.1) | 82.7 (28.2) | 69.9 (21.1) | 55.5 (13.1) | 43.3 (6.3) | 68.9 (20.5) |
| Mean daily minimum °F (°C) | 19.0 (−7.2) | 23.6 (−4.7) | 29.2 (−1.6) | 35.8 (2.1) | 43.7 (6.5) | 52.5 (11.4) | 60.2 (15.7) | 58.8 (14.9) | 49.8 (9.9) | 37.5 (3.1) | 26.5 (−3.1) | 19.6 (−6.9) | 38.0 (3.3) |
| Mean minimum °F (°C) | 5.2 (−14.9) | 10.3 (−12.1) | 17.1 (−8.3) | 22.9 (−5.1) | 31.3 (−0.4) | 40.1 (4.5) | 51.9 (11.1) | 51.4 (10.8) | 36.1 (2.3) | 24.2 (−4.3) | 12.1 (−11.1) | 5.0 (−15.0) | 1.2 (−17.1) |
| Record low °F (°C) | −32 (−36) | −22 (−30) | 1 (−17) | 9 (−13) | 10 (−12) | 20 (−7) | 38 (3) | 38 (3) | 23 (−5) | 10 (−12) | −3 (−19) | −27 (−33) | −32 (−36) |
| Average precipitation inches (mm) | 0.76 (19) | 0.73 (19) | 0.65 (17) | 0.48 (12) | 0.51 (13) | 0.27 (6.9) | 1.07 (27) | 1.30 (33) | 0.85 (22) | 0.83 (21) | 0.58 (15) | 0.72 (18) | 8.75 (222) |
| Average snowfall inches (cm) | 1.1 (2.8) | 0.9 (2.3) | 0.6 (1.5) | 0.1 (0.25) | 0.0 (0.0) | 0.0 (0.0) | 0.0 (0.0) | 0.0 (0.0) | 0.0 (0.0) | 0.1 (0.25) | 0.6 (1.5) | 1.5 (3.8) | 4.9 (12) |
| Average precipitation days (≥ 0.01 inch) | 4.4 | 4.5 | 4.1 | 3.1 | 2.8 | 1.8 | 6.3 | 7.0 | 5.3 | 4.1 | 3.4 | 4.6 | 51.4 |
| Average snowy days (≥ 0.1 inch) | 0.8 | 0.6 | 0.8 | 0.1 | 0.0 | 0.0 | 0.0 | 0.0 | 0.0 | 0.1 | 0.4 | 1.1 | 3.9 |
Source: National Oceanic and Atmospheric Administration

== Demographics ==
Historical population
| Census | Pop. | Note | %± |
|---|---|---|---|
| 2020 | 4,573 | | — |
U.S. Decennial Census

=== 2020 census ===
As of the 2020 census, Chinle had a population of 4,573. The median age was 31.2 years. 31.3% of residents were under the age of 18 and 11.4% of residents were 65 years of age or older. For every 100 females there were 87.3 males, and for every 100 females age 18 and over there were 85.0 males age 18 and over.

0.0% of residents lived in urban areas, while 100.0% lived in rural areas.

There were 1,387 households in Chinle, of which 39.0% had children under the age of 18 living in them. Of all households, 28.3% were married-couple households, 23.1% were households with a male householder and no spouse or partner present, and 42.7% were households with a female householder and no spouse or partner present. About 27.8% of all households were made up of individuals and 7.2% had someone living alone who was 65 years of age or older.

There were 1,571 housing units, of which 11.7% were vacant. The homeowner vacancy rate was 0.0% and the rental vacancy rate was 5.6%.

Racial composition as of the 2020 census
| Race | Number | Percent |
|---|---|---|
| White | 224 | 4.9% |
| Black or African American | 34 | 0.7% |
| American Indian and Alaska Native | 4,120 | 90.1% |
| Asian | 91 | 2.0% |
| Native Hawaiian and Other Pacific Islander | 0 | 0.0% |
| Some other race | 15 | 0.3% |
| Two or more races | 89 | 1.9% |
| Hispanic or Latino (of any race) | 70 | 1.5% |

=== 2000 census ===
| Languages (2000) | Percent |
|---|---|
| Spoke Navajo at home | 71.9% |
| Spoke English at home | 28.1% |

As of the census of 2000, there were 5,366 people, 1,358 households, and 1,076 families residing in the CDP. The population density was 334.7 inhabitants per square mile (129.2/km^{2}). There were 1,644 housing units at an average density of 102.6 per square mile (39.6/km^{2}). The racial makeup of the CDP was 91.3% Native American, 6.4% White, 0.2% Black or African American, 0.2% Asian, <0.1% Pacific Islander, 0.6% from other races, and 1.3% from two or more races. 1.8% of the population were Hispanic or Latino of any race.

There were 1,358 households, out of which 52.8% had children under the age of 18 living with them, 42.6% were married couples living together, 30.4% had a female householder with no husband present, and 20.7% were non-families. 18.3% of all households were made up of individuals, and 2.5% had someone living alone who was 65 years of age or older. The average household size was 3.84 and the average family size was 4.43.

In the CDP, the age distribution of the population shows 43.9% under the age of 18, 10.5% from 18 to 24, 25.8% from 25 to 44, 14.7% from 45 to 64, and 5.1% who were 65 years of age or older. The median age was 22 years. For every 100 females, there were 93.6 males. For every 100 females aged 18 and over, there were 81.9 males.

The median income for a household in the CDP was $27,324, and the median income for a family was $26,182. Males had a median income of $25,321 versus $22,663 for females. The per capita income for the CDP was $8,755. About 40.4% of families and 43.5% of the population were below the poverty line, including 52.6% of those under age 18 and 46.9% of those age 65 or over.

== Education ==
=== Primary and secondary schools ===
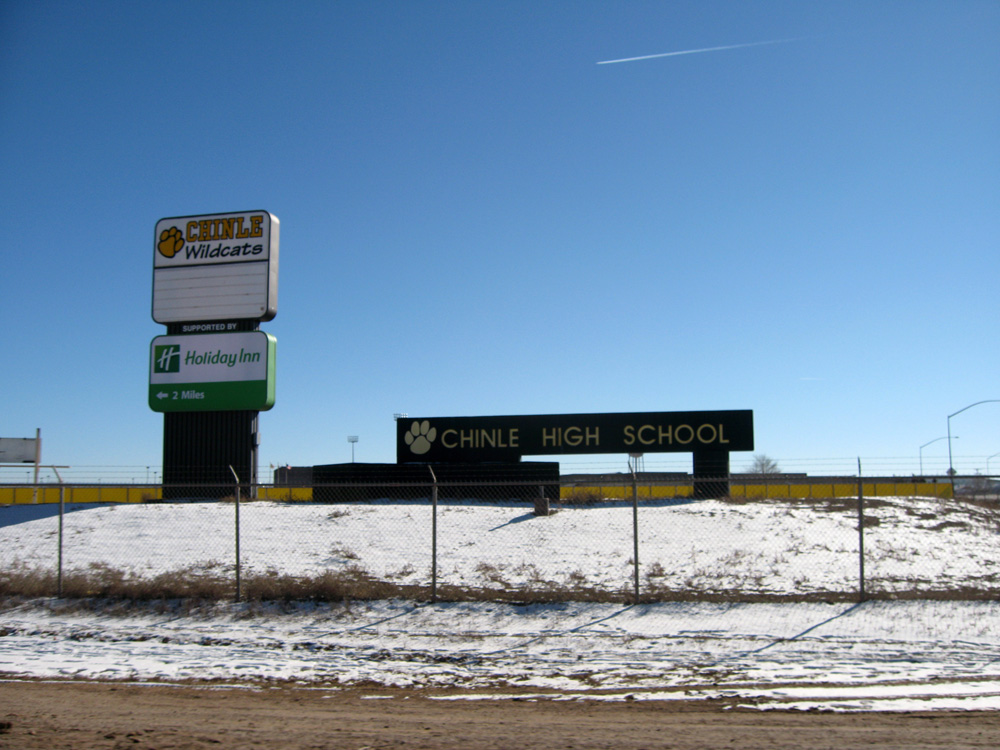
Chinle High School

The area is served by Chinle Unified School District.

Schools in the area and served by the district include Tsaile Elementary School (K-8), Many Farms Elementary School (K-6), Canyon de Chelly Elementary School (K-6), Chinle Elementary School (K-6), Mesa View Elementary School (K-6), Chinle Junior High School (7-8), and Chinle High School (9-12).

The Bureau of Indian Education (BIE) operates the Cottonwood Day School in an area with a Chinle postal address, 11 miles (18 km) west of U.S. Highway 191 on Navajo Route 4.

The Chinle Boarding School, a Bureau of Indian Affairs (BIA) school, was formerly in Chinle until 1976, when it moved to Many Farms, though initially it had the same name post-move. The name later changed to Many Farms Community School (MFCS).

=== Tertiary education ===
A branch of the Diné College is located here as well as a branch of Northern Arizona University and Navajo Technical University.

== Health ==
The Navajo AIDS Network is based in Chinle. Chinle Comprehensive Healthcare Center Chinle IHS is a full-service Healthcare facility operated by the US Indian Health Service. It includes a hospital, emergency services, outpatient clinic, pharmacy, dental clinic and other health-related services. These services are reserved for Native Americans except in emergencies. The pharmacy is not open to the general public.

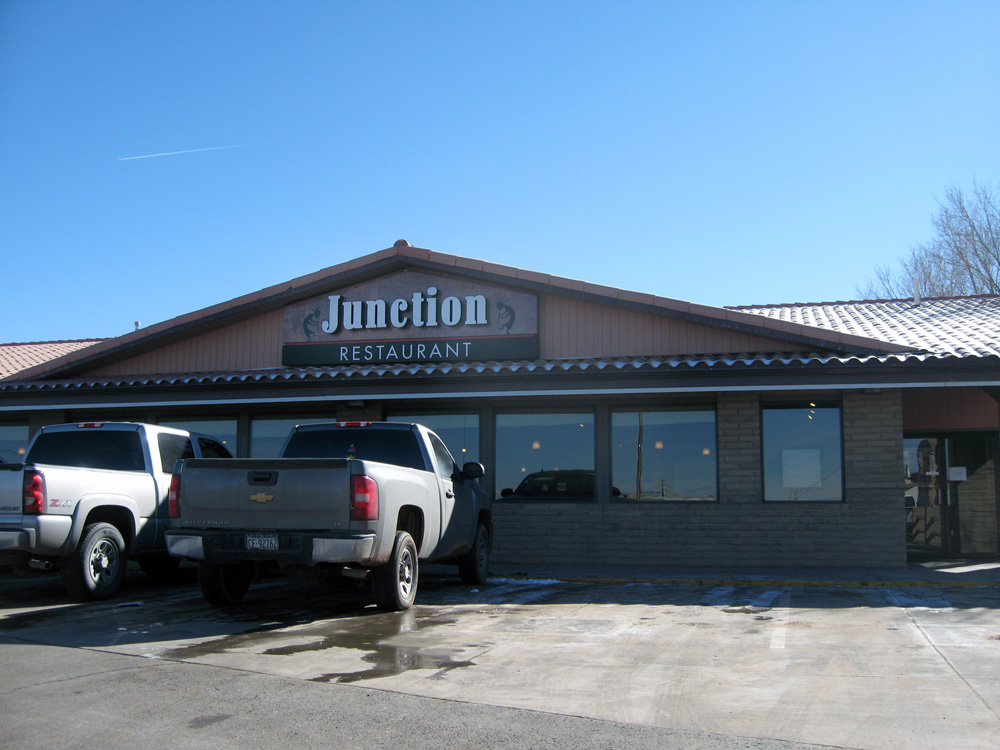
The Junction Restaurant in Chinle

== Government ==
Several Federal, County and Navajo tribal agencies are located in town. The local government is located at the Chinle Chapter House. The Chapter House serves as a town hall with a Chapter President, Vice President and Secretary/Treasurer as elected officials.

Other departments include the Navajo Police Department, Navajo Housing Authority, Navajo Tribal Utility Authority, Navajo Parks and Recreation, Apache County Office, Indian Health Service, Bureau of Indian Affairs, and the National Park Service.

== Nearby attractions ==
- Canyon de Chelly National Monument
- Hubbell Trading Post National Historic Site

== Notable people ==
- Keats Begay, Navajo painter, was born in Chinle.
- Jeremiah Bitsui, actor was born in Chinle.
- Shawna Ann Claw, Navajo Nation Council member
- Robert Draper, Navajo painter
- Megalyn Echikunwoke, Nigerian-American actress was raised in the town.
- Carl Nelson Gorman was a Navajo code talker during World War II.
- R.C. Gorman, artist and printmaker, son of Carl Nelson Gorman.
- Thomas Claw, Navajo Codetalker, born in Chinle

== See also ==
- List of census-designated places in Arizona
- Chinle Formation
