= Navajo trading posts =

Trading posts on the Navajo Reservation in the 19th and 20th centuries

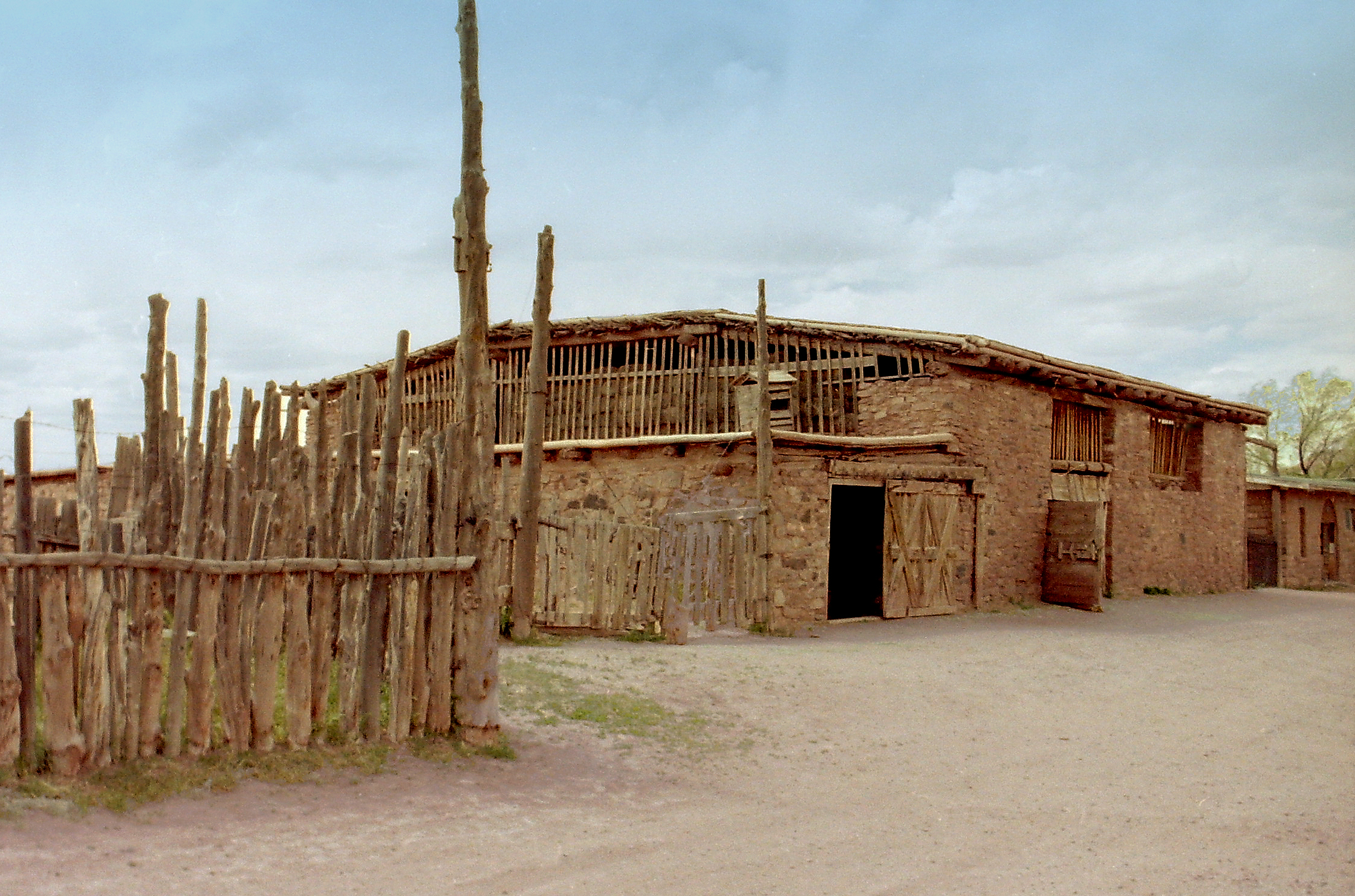
Hubbell Trading Post, Ganado, Arizona.

Populated places on the Navajo Reservation. Many of the populated places originated at the location of trading posts.

Navajo trading posts flourished on the Navajo Indian Reservation in Arizona, New Mexico, and Utah from 1868 until about 1970. Trading posts, usually owned by non-Navajos, were the origin of many populated places on the reservation. They were often the center of commercial, cultural, and social life for the Navajos. At their peak in the first half of the 20th century about 100 trading posts were scattered around the reservation. The most important items traded and sold by the Navajo to the traders were wool, sheep and goat skins, and woven textiles. The most important items purchased by the Navajo at the trading posts were flour, sugar, coffee, tobacco, cloth, and canned goods. In the late 20th century, most trading posts were replaced by Navajo-owned businesses, shopping centers, and convenience stores.

== History ==
Prior to their defeat by Kit Carson in 1864, the Navajo had been both raiding and trading with the Hispanic settlements of New Mexico for more than 200 years, acquiring in the process large herds of sheep and other livestock. Following their defeat, the U.S. Army forced more than 8,000 Navajo to relocate to Bosque Redondo in eastern New Mexico in what is called The Long Walk. The war and the forced residence at Bosque Redondo devastated the Navajo's economy and made them familiar with and dependent upon U.S. Army provided rations and manufactured products. In 1868, the Navajo were permitted to return to their homeland in the Four Corners area of New Mexico, Arizona, and Utah. The U.S. government pledged to provide the returning Navajo with the means to make a living by farming and ranching and the Navajo pledged to halt their raiding. The 3,000 or more Navaho who had avoided the Long Walk came out of hiding and joined the returnees.

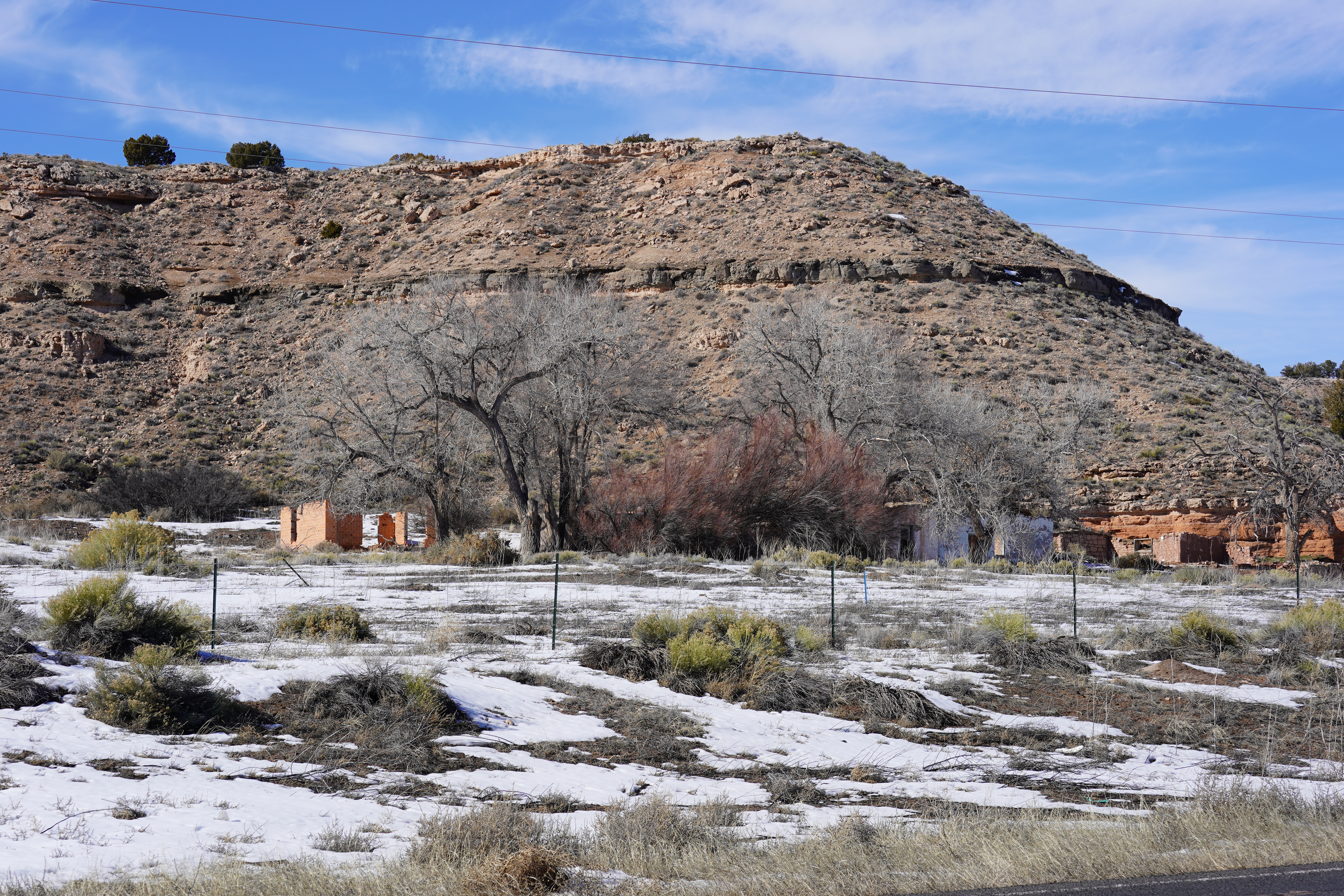
Ruins of a trading post near Shonto, Arizona.

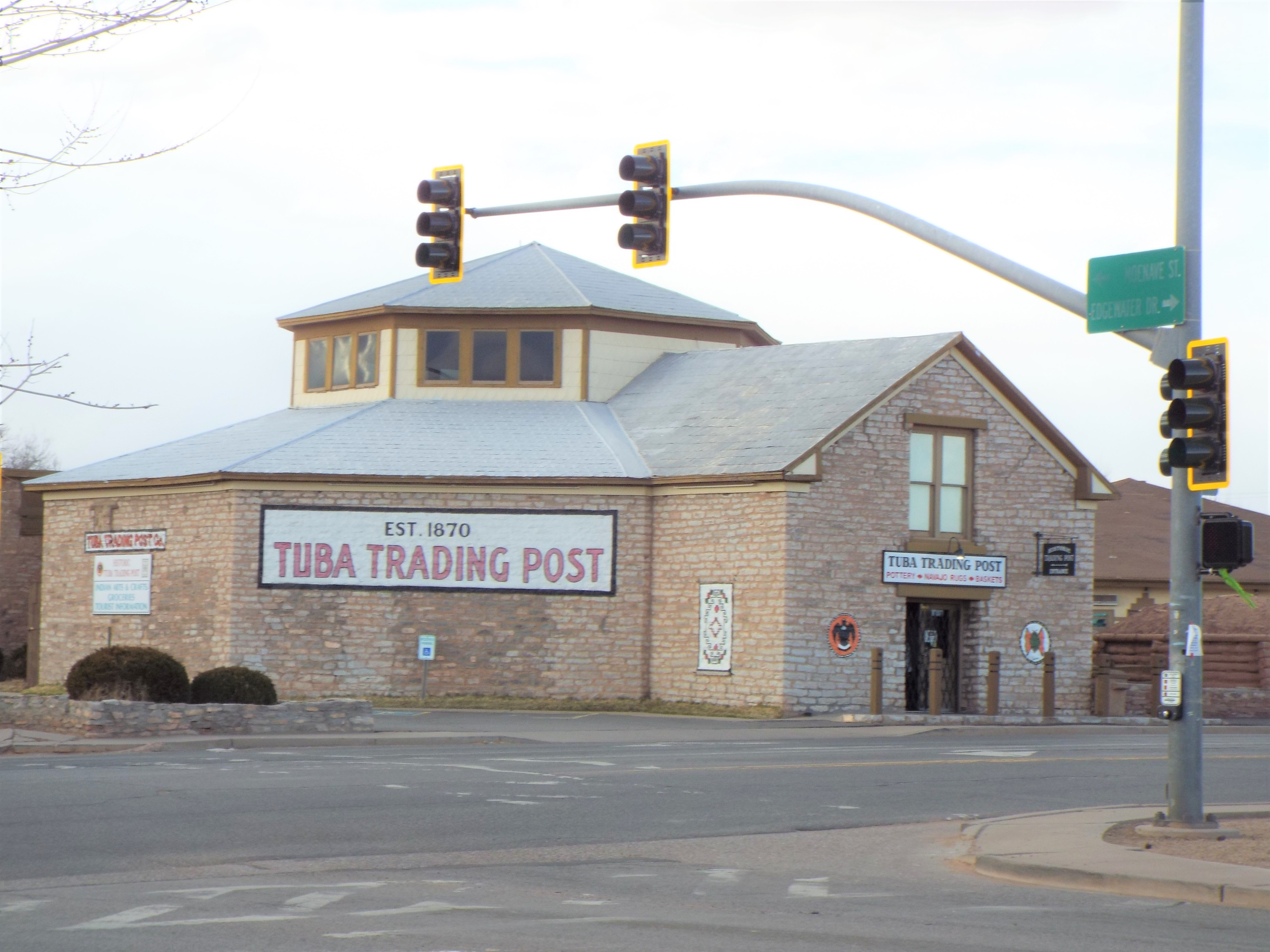
First built in 1891, the Tuba trading post as it appeared in 2020.

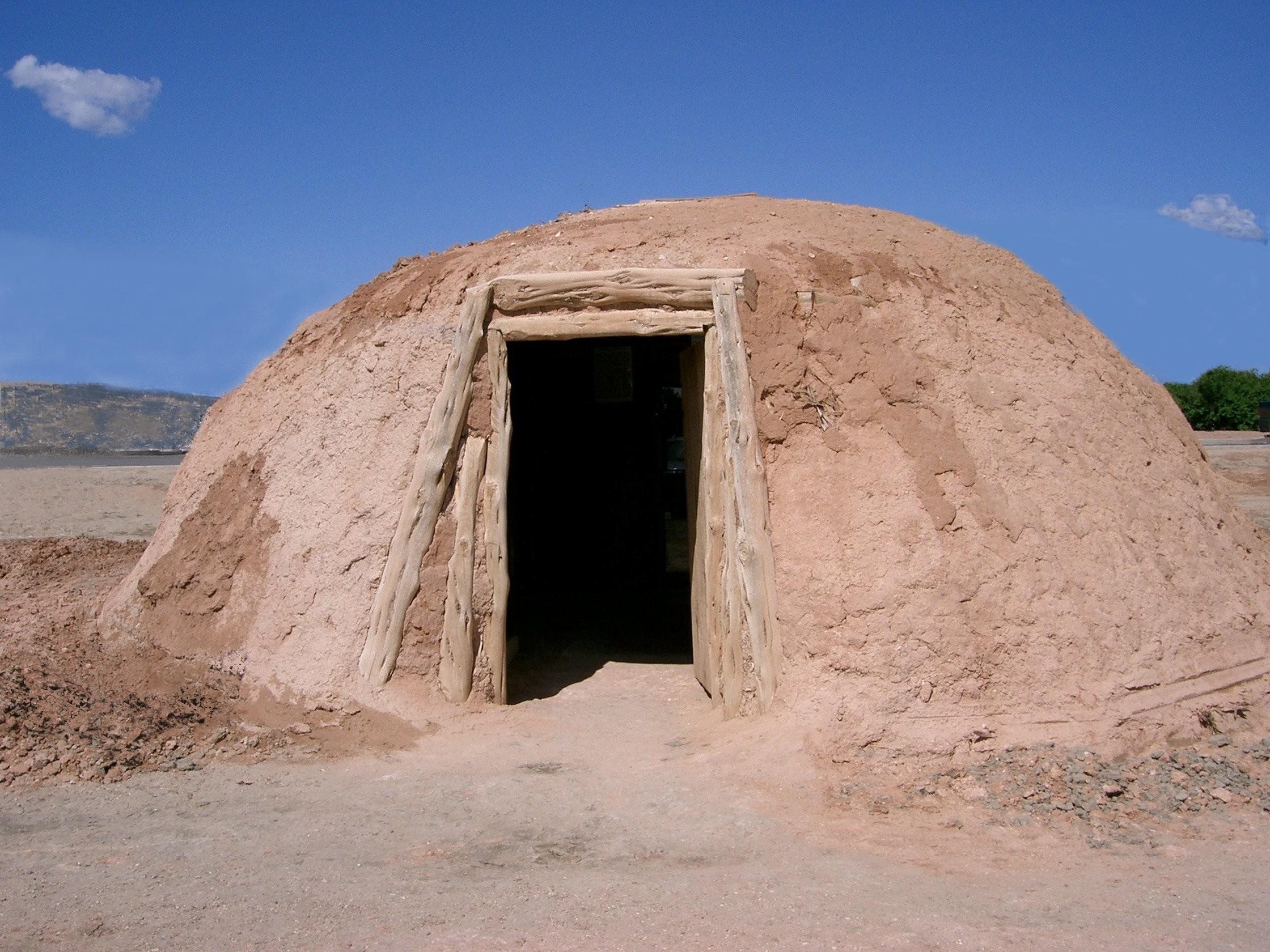
A traditional Navajo hogan.

The Navajo reservation was expanded over time to an area of 17,544,500 acres (71,000 km^{2}; 27,413 sq mi). The reservation measures about 300 km (190 miles) east to west and 250 km (160 miles) north to south. The seat of government is located in Window Rock, Arizona. The remoteness of much of the reservation and the Navajo need for goods produced by Hispanic and Anglo settlers led to the establishment of trading posts on their lands. As it might be a week distant by horseback from their homes to sources of supply, the trading posts brought goods to the Navajo rather than them having the necessity to travel off the reservation. The Navajo learned also that a market existed for products they produced including wool and woven blankets and carpets. The trading post became the vehicle both for the Navajo obtaining the goods they needed and a market for the products they wished to sell.

A sutler at Fort Defiance, Arizona began trading with the Navajo in 1851, but Fort Defiance closed in 1868 and the era of privately owned trading posts began. The first license by the U.S. government for a trading post on the Navajo reservation was to Lehman Spiegelburg at Fort Defiance in 1868. In 1870, another Anglo was trading guns and ammunition to the Navajo for livestock. He sold the livestock in Albuquerque. In the early 1870s the precursor to the Hubbell Trading Post was established in Ganado, Arizona. Juan (or John) Lorenzo Hubbell took ownership of the trading post in 1878. The Hubbell post is now preserved as the Hubbell Trading Post National Historic Site. Hubbell would eventually own 30 trading posts and other establishments on the Navajo Reservation. Among the most isolated trading posts was Oljato in San Juan County, Utah. First established in 1906 by John and Louisa Wade Wetherill, the local Navajos had been little influenced by Hispanic and Anglo culture.

The number of trading posts on the reservation expanded to almost 25 in 1885, 93 in 1939, more than 100 after World War II, and declining to 35 in 1970. A total of about 300 trading posts, many of them ephemeral, existed during the 100-plus years of their history. The number of trading posts declined as roads improved, access to vehicles expanded, and wage labor increased. Beginning in the mid-1960s, the Navajo government began promoting Navajo-owned businesses and constructing shopping centers in population centers on the reservation. By 2000, no more than a dozen trading posts survived.

== Doing business ==
A trader needed a license from the U.S. government and the permission of the local Navajo headman to establish a trading post. Traders did not own the land on which their posts were located. Many trading posts originated when a trader with a buggy load of goods began trading products in a tent and, if business was good, built an adobe or stone building with a store, lodging for himself and his family and employees, and a special room for showing and selling Navajo-made blankets and carpets. A storage warehouse, a corral for horses, and possibly other outbuildings were near the main building. Trading posts were usually unpretentious in appearance. The store consisted of a reception area, called a "bull pen," with a plank or dirt floor. Navajo customers lolled in this area and conducted business leisurely, availing themselves of free tobacco and paper to roll cigarettes. High wooden counters enclosed the bull pen on three sides behind which the wares for sale were displayed. By regulation (and for their safety) most licensed traders on the reservation did not sell firearms or whiskey, although bootlegging of whiskey was common. Many traders kept a revolver behind the counter for protection. Many traders also dealt in horses which were pastured near the post. A Navajo dwelling, a hogan, built at the trader's expense, was near the post for the free use of any customers who came from a distance. Sometimes a spring was nearby; if not the trader had a well dug.

The most important goods the trader sold were flour, coffee and sugar. Plugs of tobacco and cloth for making clothes were next. Canned food goods became important items for sale in the 20th century. Sheep wool was the most important product traded or sold by the Navajo to the trader. By 1888, the Navajo were selling 800,000 lb (360,000 kg) of wool for 8 to 10 cents per pound. They also sold sheep and goat skins to traders. Pine nuts were a major Navajo product in the infrequent years in which the pinyon pine produced large quantities of nuts.

Resupply for the trading posts came from settlements around the periphery of the Navajo reservation. For some posts, resupply required only an ox-cart journey of a few days. For isolated posts, resupply took longer. Supplying the Oljato post of the Wetherills required a 21-day round trip from Gallup, New Mexico in the early 1900s. Trading posts became more accessible with automobiles and road construction. Trader Clyde Colville constructed a road to his trading post at Kayenta in 1914.

=== Money ===
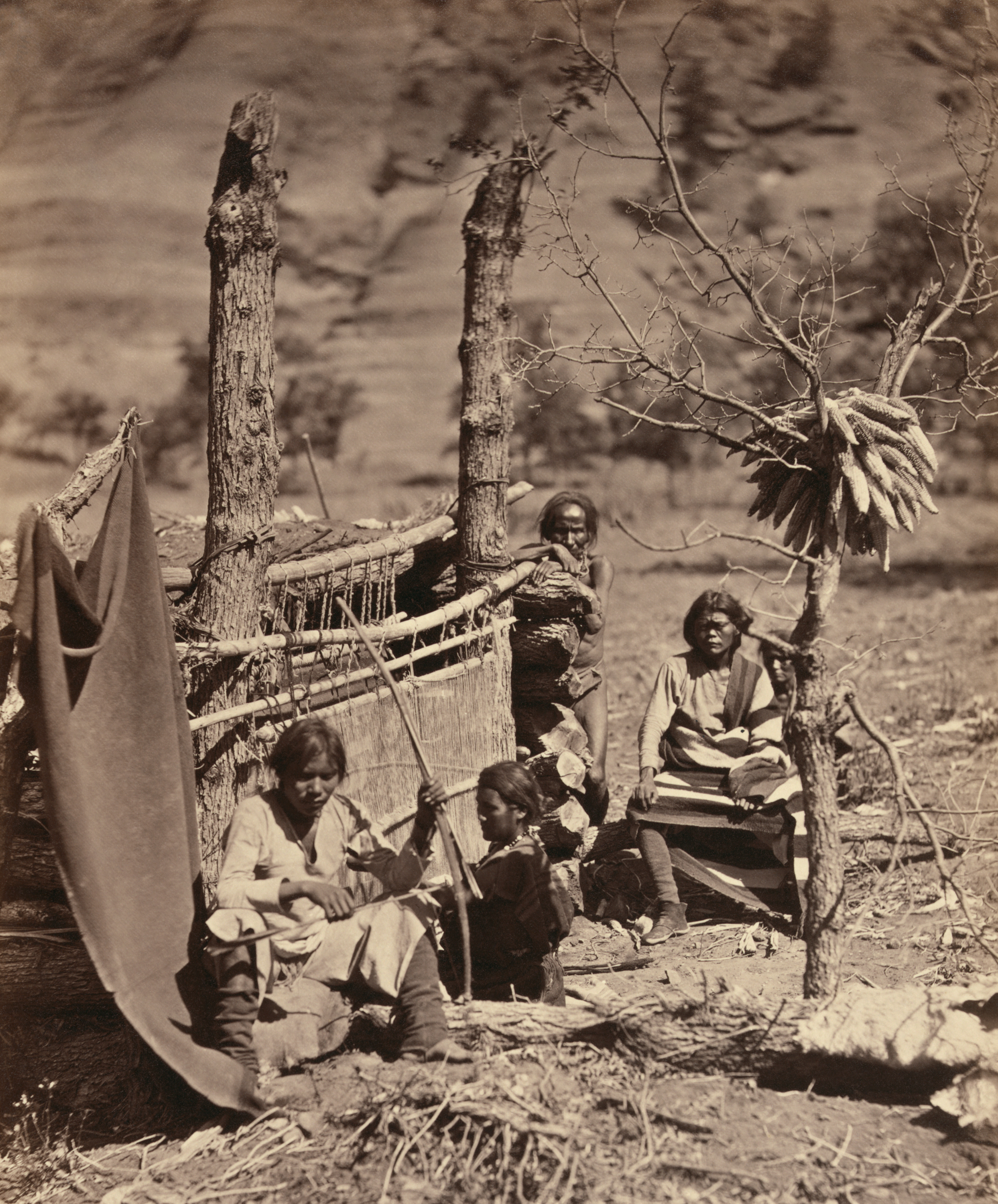
A Navajo family and loom for weaving blankets, 1873

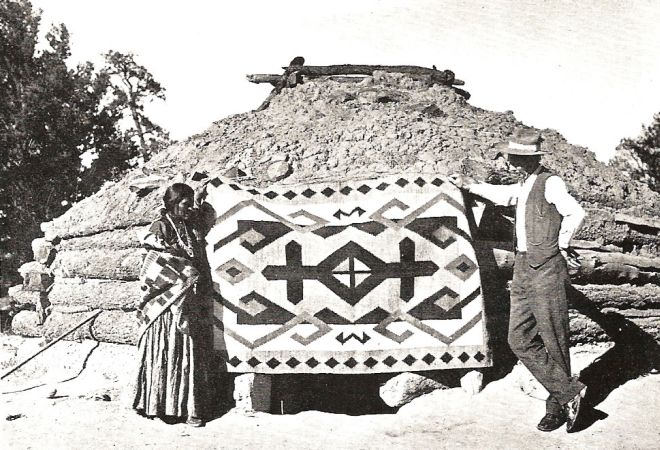
Trader John Bradford Moore and a Navajo rug, 1911.

Straight barter was common at posts, especially in the 19th century, but substitutes for cash, in short supply for traders and the Navajo, became necessary. In lieu of dealing with the Navajo in cash, many traders issued metal tokens valued at up to one dollar and redeemable for products at their trading post. Mexican silver dollars were popular with the Navajo. They melted the coins down to make silver jewelry for their personal adornment and a store of wealth as well as serving a growing market for Navajo jewelry. Pawnbrokering was practiced by many trading posts. Navajo income was seasonal, depending in the 19th century mostly upon harvests of wool, and Navajos would pawn their silver jewelry and other items in times when cash was short. The traders would hold the item until the customer could redeem it with a 10 percent interest charge. Pawn transactions were usually small. In 1909, the average pawn was valued at less than three dollars at one trading post. The use of tokens and the practice of pawning were both discouraged by the U.S. government.

Traders were sometimes overextended. When Richard Wetherill, better known for archaeology than business acumen, was murdered in 1910, he was owed eleven thousand dollars by Navajos, Anglos, and Hispanics. Most of the money was never collected. By contrast, Hubbell had a virtual "empire" of trading posts and became also a prominent Arizona politician.

== Navajo weaving ==
An important source of income for the trading posts and Navajo families were blankets and rugs woven by women. Navaho weaving had long been praised for its quality and artistic appeal. In 1850, an American soldier characterized Navajo blankets as "the best in the world." In the 1890s, traders began large-scale marketing of Navajo blankets and rugs to meet a growing demand. To increase production and often at the expense of quality, traders introduced new designs, aniline dyes, and manufactured wool and cotton yarn.

Larger rugs might take Navajo women up to a year to complete. For many decades after 1868 weavers earned less than 5 cents per hour for their work. The profit of the trader from selling weavings could be substantial. About 1970, for example, a Navajo weaver was paid 30 dollars for a rug which the trader priced at 250 dollars in his store. Author M'Closkey has asserted that the contribution of Navajo women to the economy of the Navajo has been ignored by historians. "Decade after decade, the importance, the necessity, even the survival of the Navajo rested primarily on women's textile production and the wool from their sheep."

== Decline of trading posts ==
Until World War II, the trading post and the trader were often the only daily contact of the Navaho with Anglo-American society. "The trader was not only the sole source of white society's goods; he was also the post office, interpreter, scribe, banker, creditor, newscaster, employment agent, railroad claims agent, ambulance driver, and furnished the community social center." Some traders became deeply embedded in Navajo culture and language. Louisa Wade Wetherill, for example, was an expert in Navajo sand painting and medicinal plants.

Some traders were disreputable. Complaints about questionable business practices by traders led to an investigation and hearings by the Federal Trade Commission (FTC) in 1972. Traders were accused of price fixing, withholding government checks from recipients, and violations of the Truth in Lending Act. Pushback on the FTC report and hearings included one scholar who described the hearings as "political theater" and "the Ivy League meets the Wild West." The FTC proposed reforms, but by that time alternatives and competition to the trading posts had increased and the trading post system was declining in importance. The FTC investigations led some traders to close their posts.

== Trader Navajo Pidgin ==
In these trading posts a pidgin was used between the Navajo, Anglo-Americans, and other Native Americans called Trader Navajo.

Trader Navajo
- Ethnicity: Navajo, Anglo-Americans, Southwestern American Natives
- Language family: Pidgin: Trader Navajo

Language codes
- ISO 639-3: –
