= Gutiérrez Hubbell House =

Historic hacienda in New Mexico

- Gutiérrez Hubbel House
- U.S. National Register of Historic Places
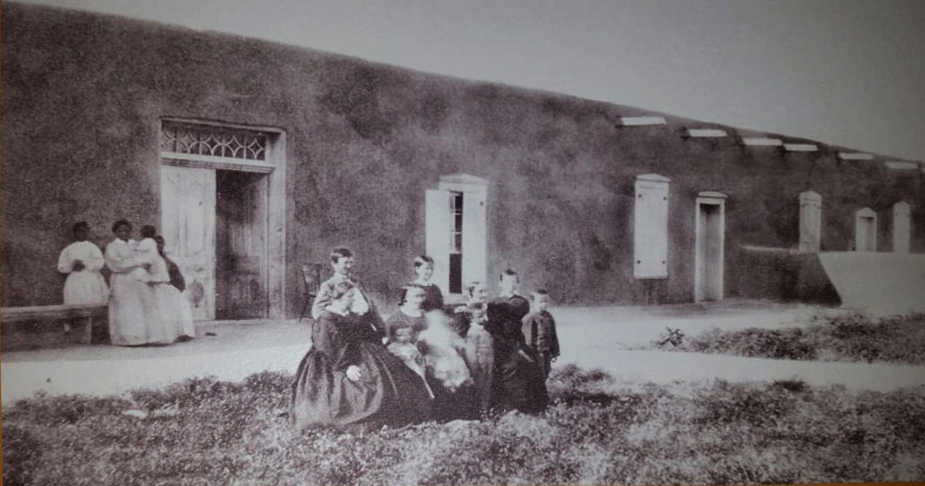
- Gutiérrez Hubble House in 1867

- Location within New Mexico Location within the United States
- Location: 6029 Isleta Boulevard SW, Albuquerque, New Mexico.
- Coordinates: 34°59′20″N 106°41′47″W
- Built: c. 1820s, enlarged in 1850s and 1860s
- Architect: Gutiérrez-Hubbell family
- Architectural style: Territorial style adobe
- Website: gutierrezhubbellhouse.org
- NRHP reference No.: 15000491
- Added to NRHP: May 26, 2015

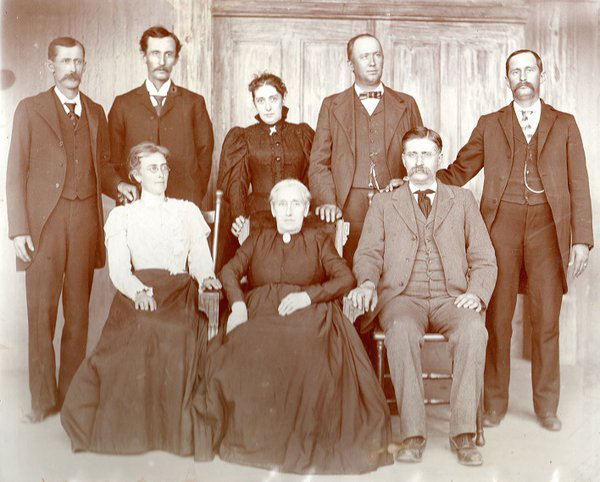
Julianita Gutiérrez Hubbell (center) with some of her children, c. 1890s

The Gutiérrez Hubbell House, also known as the James Lawrence and Juliana Gutierrez y Chavez Hubbell House, is a historic territorial-style hacienda. The original house dates back to the 1820s, and was enlarged in the 1850s and 1860s. It is located in the village of Pajarito in the South Valley of Albuquerque, New Mexico. The house has existed under three national flags: Spain, Mexico and the United States.

The house is listed on the State of New Mexico Register of Cultural Properties as a symbol of the blending of Spanish, Native American and Anglo cultures and traditions, and is also listed on the National Register of Historic Places. It is managed by the National Park Service.

== History ==
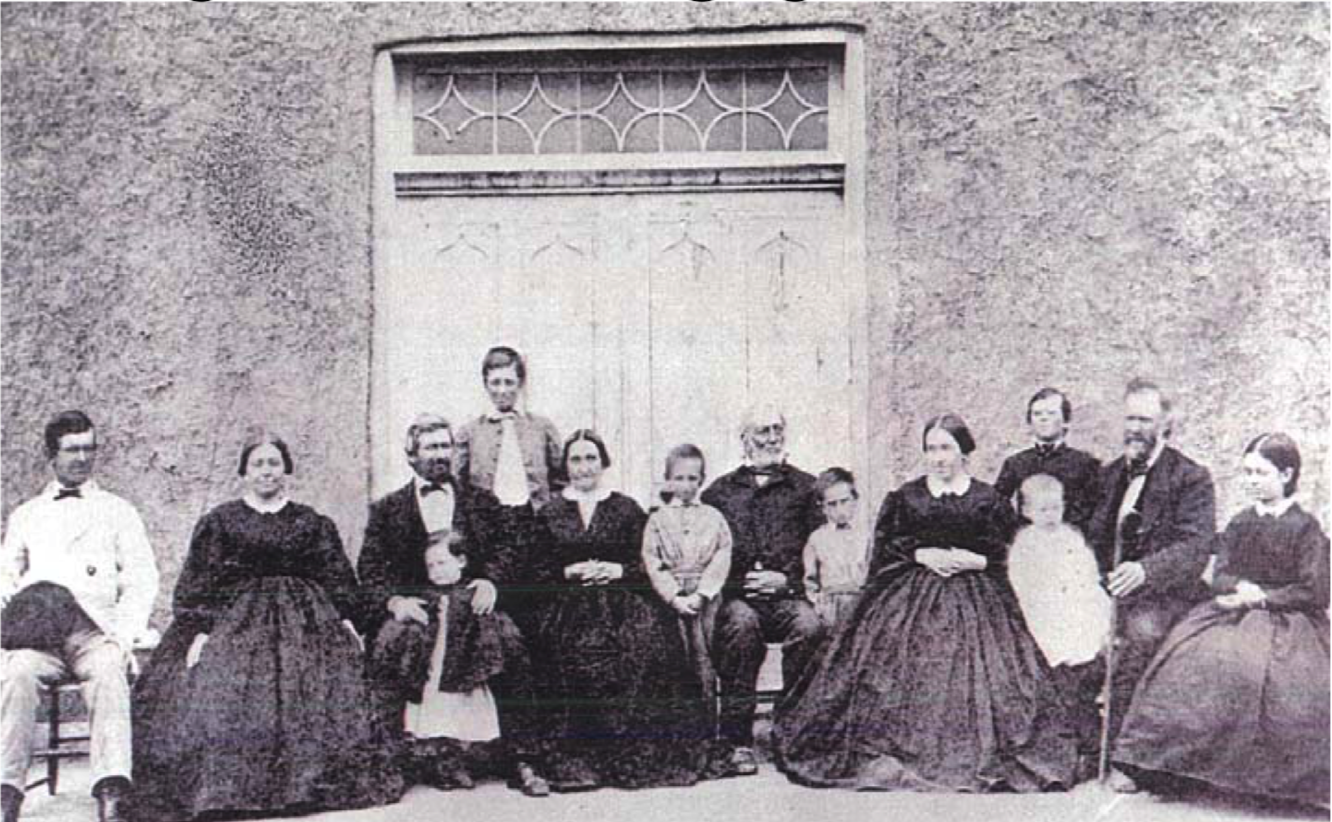
Gutiérrez-Hubbell family in 1867. Julianita Gutiérrez fifth from right, James Santiago Hubbell, second from right.

The property originally consisted of a 40,000 acre estate owned by Clemente and Josefa Gutiérrez who willed it to their great-granddaughter, Julianita. Sometime later, Julianita married James Lawrence "Santiago" Hubbell in 1849. The Gutiérrez family was a prominent ranching and trading family who were related to the Baca family and Chaves clan. Hubbell was born in Connecticut to an Anglo father and a Hispanic mother. Hubbell was a captain who served with General Stephen Watts Kearny. Julianita Gutiérrez' paternal grandfather was among the first governors to serve New Mexico when it was still under Mexican rule.

The hacienda is situated on the El Camino Real de Tierra Adentro National Historic Trail that spans from Mexico City, Mexico to Ohkay Owingeh (San Juan Pueblo) north of Santa Fe, New Mexico. It was built by James "Santiago" Hubbell and his wife, Julianita Gutiérrez Hubbell, with the help of their twelve children. One of their children, Don (John) Lorenzo Hubbell, established the Hubbell Trading Post located on the Navajo Indian Reservation in Ganado, Arizona.

The hacienda later became a stagecoach stop, trading post, and a post office.

Hubbell died in 1885, but Mrs. Gutiérrez Hubbell continued to live at the house until 1899. After her death the same year the hacienda passed to J. Felipe Hubbell. By 1927 the estate was recorded as having a 16-room adobe house, a 3-room casita, 130 acres of land, 20 acres of orchards, 42 acres of pasture land and 59 acres of alfalfa. Descendants of the Gutiérrez Hubbell's continued to live at the home until the 1990s. In 2020 the property was bought by Bernalillo County.

The property was listed as a New Mexico State Registered Cultural Property in 1976. In 2008 it was designated an official site on the Camino Real de Tierra Adentro National Historic Trail.

== Architecture ==
The earliest part of the house was constructed in 1825 by the Gutiérrez family.

The 5,748 square foot flat-roofed house was built with 28-inch thick adobe walls, with 10-foot high ceilings supported by pine vigas. The style is reflective of those used by the Puebloans and the Spanish. The Greek Revival details place it within the Territorial Style prevalent in Northern New Mexico. The viga beams supporting the roof were cut between 1850 and 1859, based on core samples.

The original house consisted of eight rooms with additional rooms added at later dates. The large sala room served as a multi-purpose salon or living room. It was designed for cross-ventilation with transom windows and double doorways. There are nichos in the walls to display devotional shrines, candles, and for storage. In addition to the sala, there was a parlor designed for large gatherings and entertaining of guests, and furnished with formal furniture. By the turn of the century, the home hosted numerous political and social functions, and became a showpiece of the Albuquerque area. There were several bedrooms, a kitchen, a room that served as an office for the Hubbell's mercantile business, in addition to other rooms.

The large enclosed plaza was surrounded by many storerooms, sheds and corrals. Another outdoor "room" was the zaguan, a wide outdoor passage for people as well as livestock and carts to move between the inner courtyard and the exterior of the compound.

In 2003, the house was chosen by the National Trust for Historic Preservation as one of the 12 original "Save America's Treasures" projects. The Gutiérrez Hubbell House History and Cultural Center is owned by Bernallio County Open Space and managed by the non-profit organization Hubbell House Alliance.

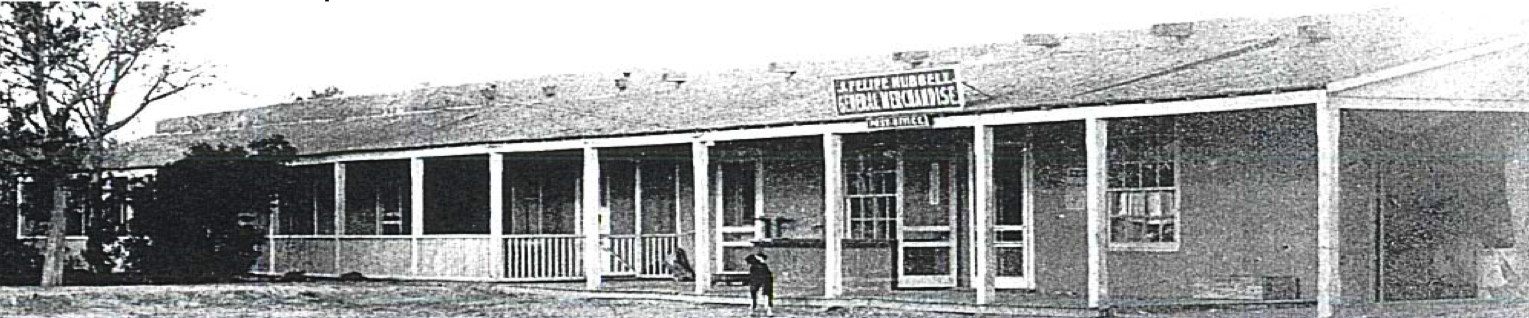
Gutiérrez Hubbell House with store and post office in 1900

== Location ==
The hacienda is located on 10 acres of the original 40,000 acre estate that includes orchards with heirloom apple, pear and peach trees. These are irrigated by an acequia system that was built in the 1600s. It is located at 6029 Isleta Blvd. SW, Albuquerque, NM, 87105.

== Gallery ==
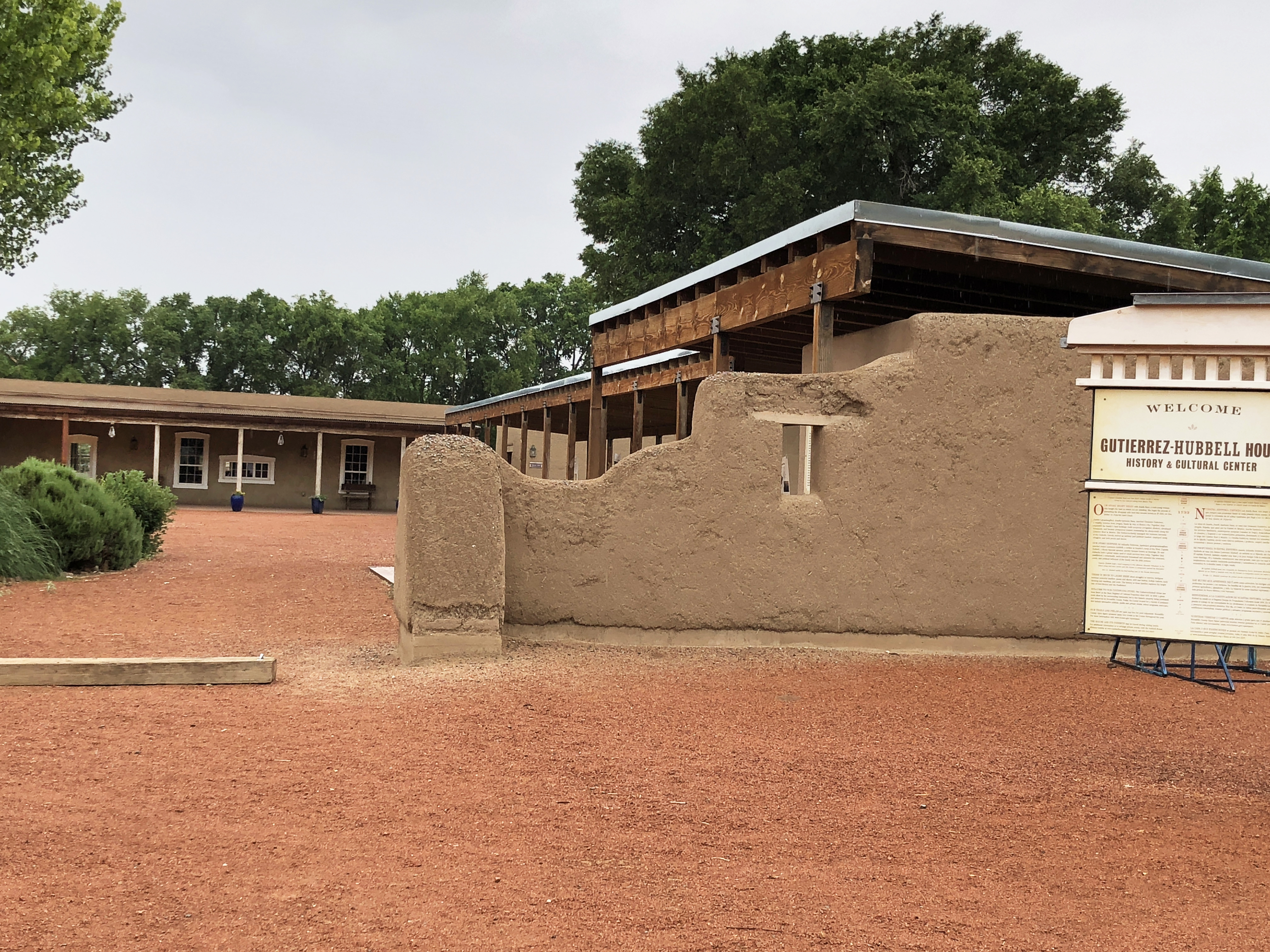
Gutiérrez Hubbell House in 2021, exterior adobe wall and entrance to interior courtyard structures and portal

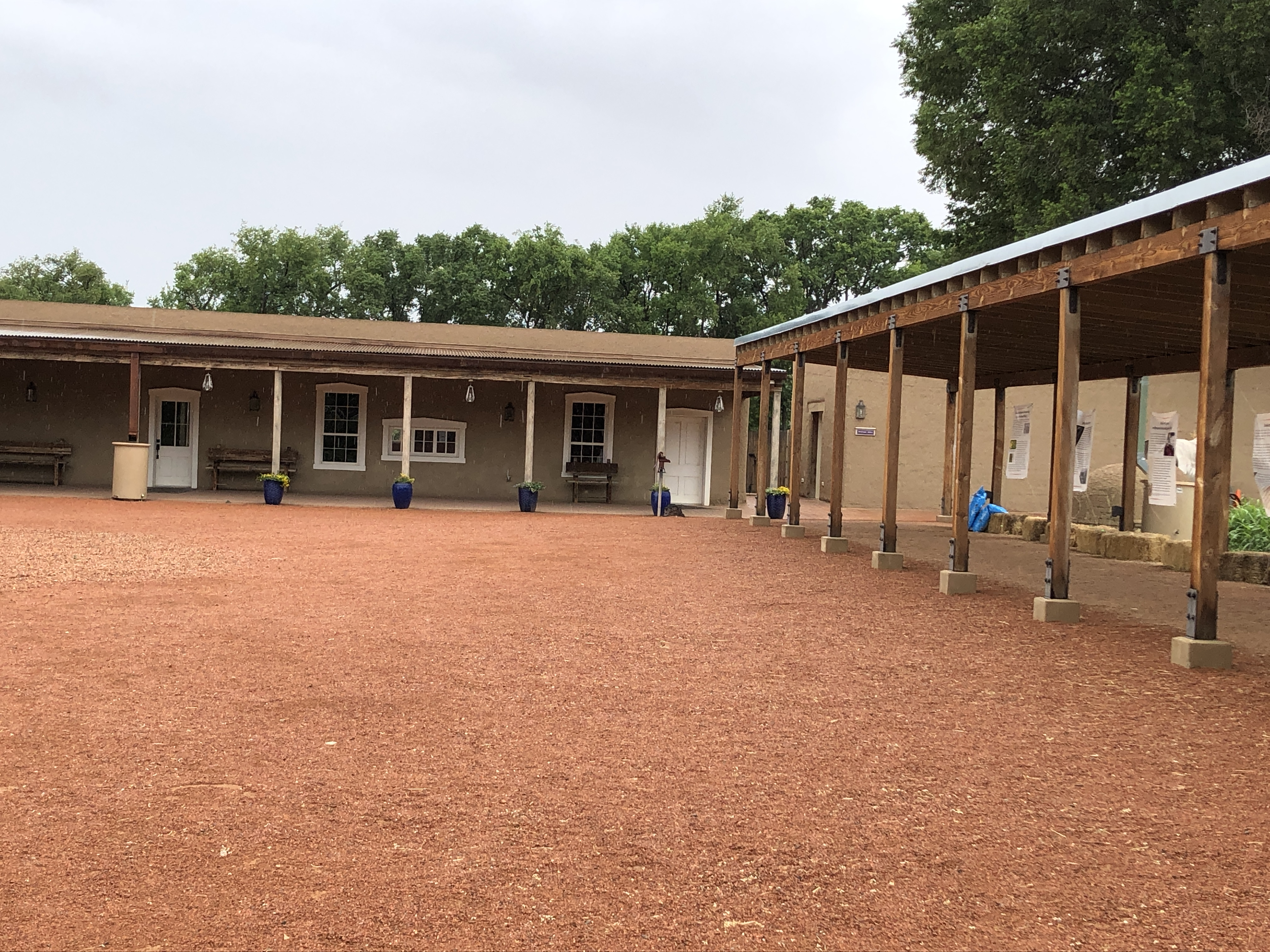
Gutierrez Hubble House and portal in inner courtyard in 2021

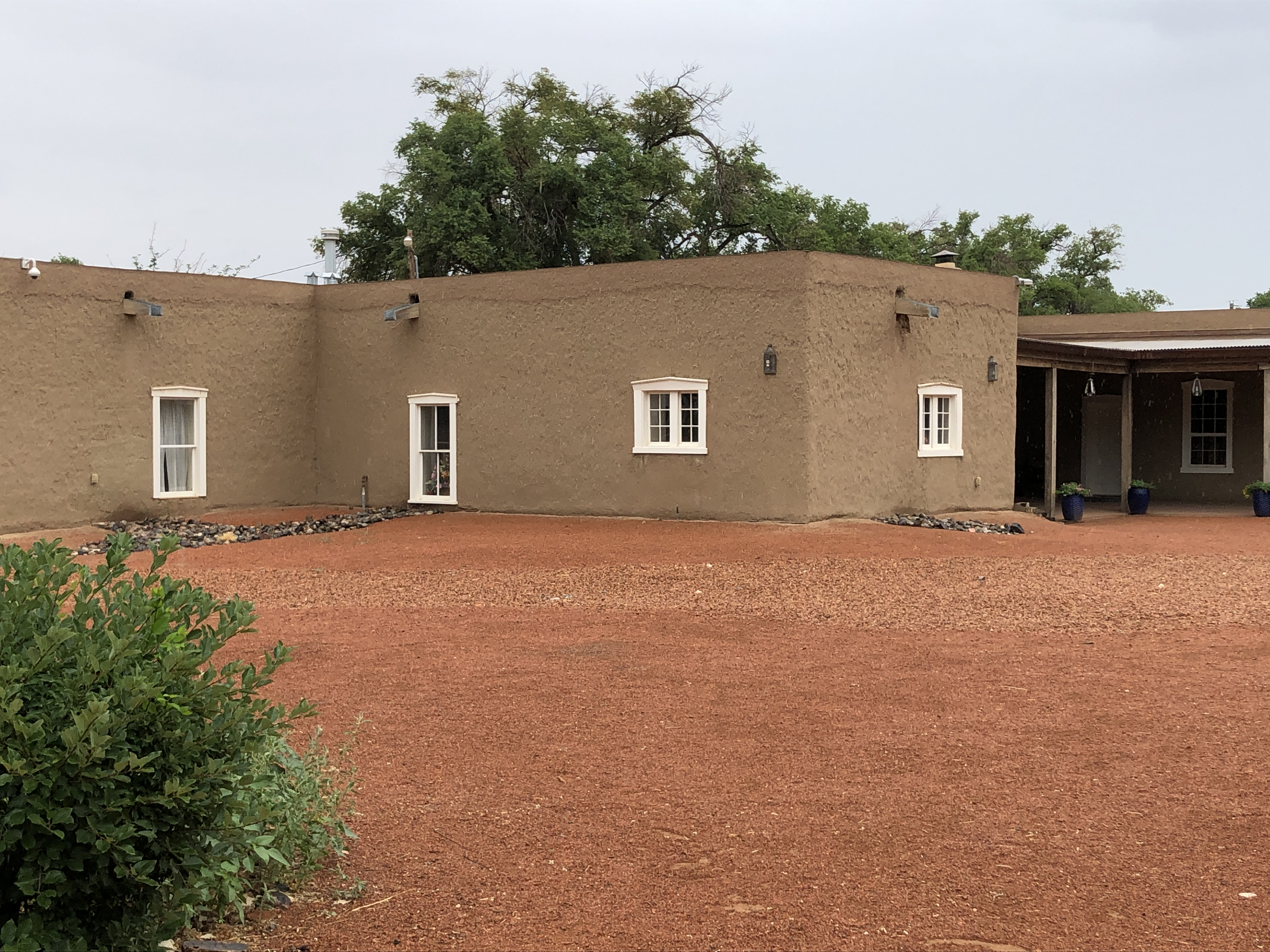
Gutierrez Hubble House adobe structure in 2021

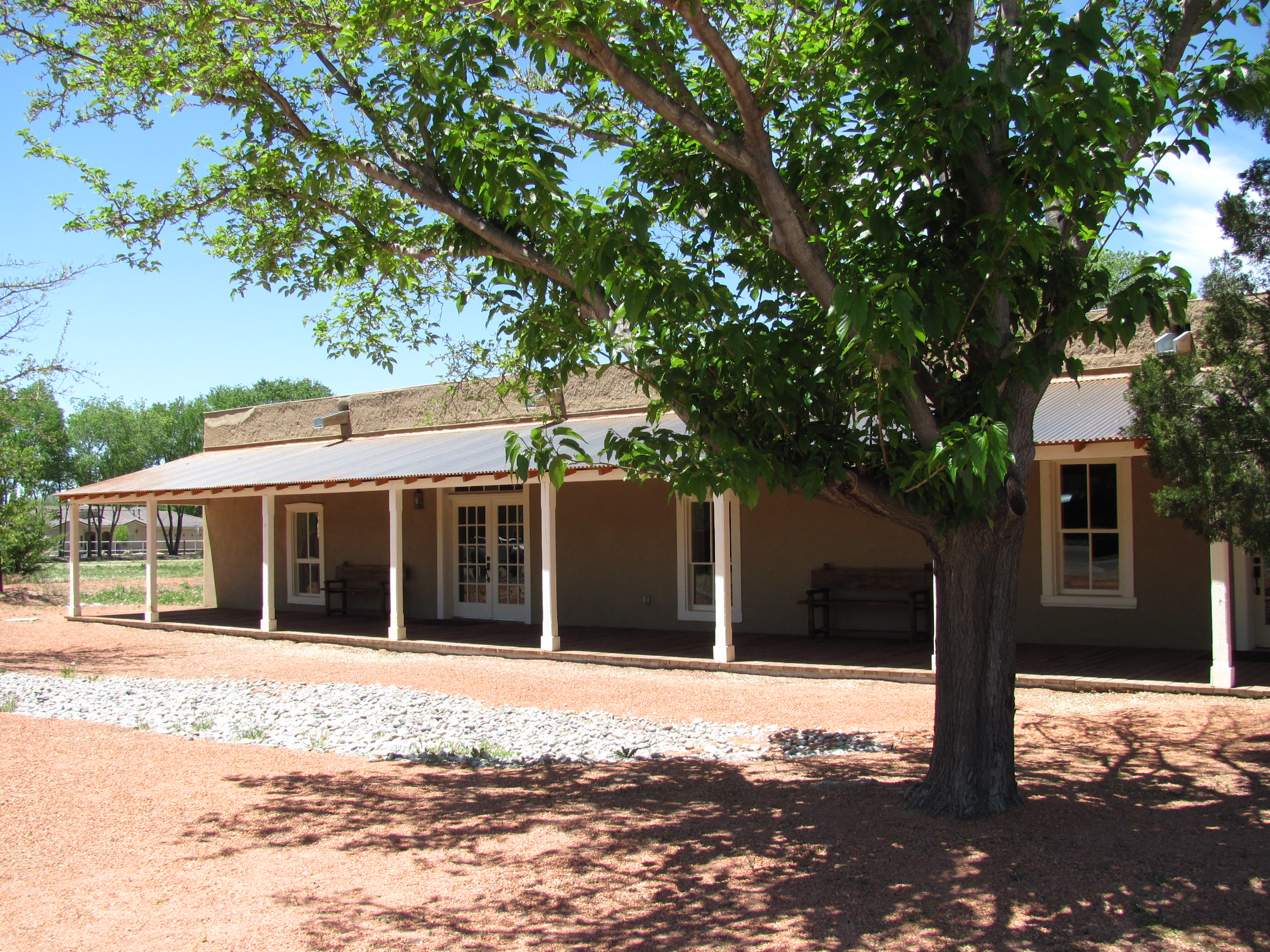
Gutiérrez-Hubbell House in 2010

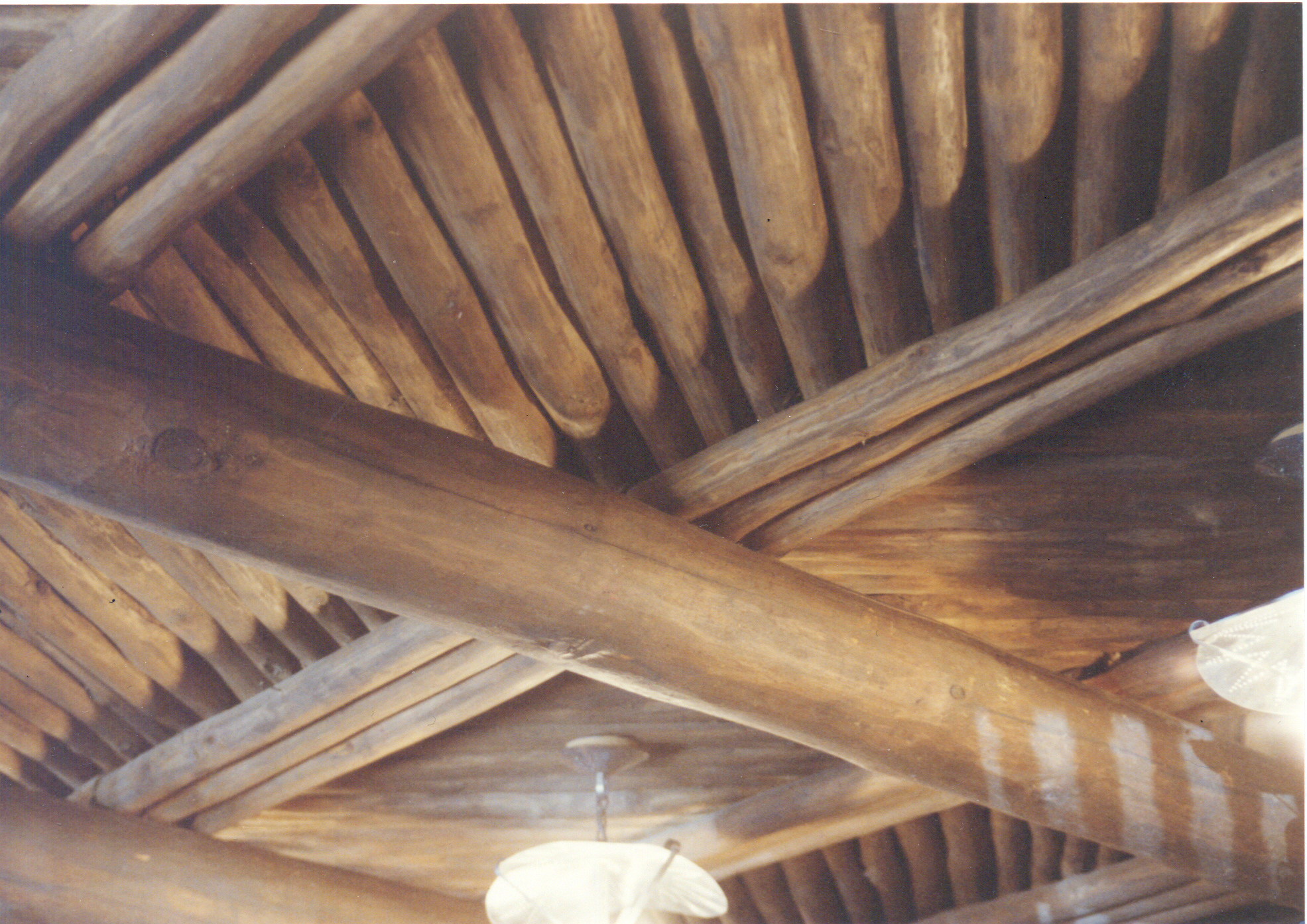
example of viga and latilla ceiling construction typically used in Northern New Mexico architecture
