= J. Lorenzo Hubbell =

Arizona politician (1853–1930)

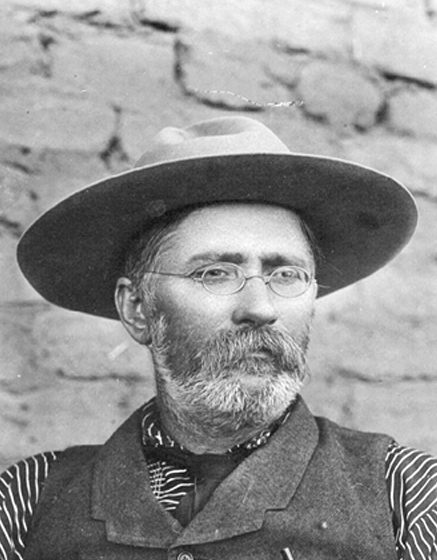
- J. Lorenzo Hubbell

Member of the Arizona Senate from the Apache County district
- In office March 1912 – March 1914
- Preceded by: Seat established
- Succeeded by: Fred Colter

Personal details
- Born: November 27, 1853 South Valley, New Mexico Territory, U.S.
- Died: November 12, 1930 (aged 76) Ganado, Arizona, U.S.
- Party: Republican
- Spouse: Lena Rubi (m. 1879; died 1913)
- Children: 4
- Profession: Politician

John Lorenzo Hubbell (November 27, 1853 – November 12, 1930) was a member of the Arizona State Senate. He was elected to serve in the 1st Arizona State Legislature from Apache County. He served in the Senate from March 1912 until March 1914. Hubbell was the long-time owner of the Hubbell Trading Post established in 1878 on the Navajo Reservation in Ganado, Arizona. The trading post is preserved as the Hubbell Trading Post National Historic Site.

== Early life ==
John (Juan) Lorenzo Hubbell was the son of James (Santiago) Lawrence Hubbell, a pioneer from Salisbury, Connecticut, who traveled to the Southwest, settling in New Mexico in 1848, where he became a government contractor, specializing in cattle. His mother was Julianita Gutierrez, the heiress of an old New Mexican family, who inherited large estates in the New Mexico territory, holding the Pajarito Land Grand from 1739 from the Spanish government. His parents built the historic Gutiérrez Hubbell House. His father had come to the Southwest as a trader on the Santa Fe Trail, settling in New Mexico in 1848. Hubbell was born in Pajarito, located in South Valley, New Mexico on November 27, 1853, when Arizona was still part of the New Mexico Territory. The ranch where he was born, the Gutiérrez Hubbell House, was registered on the National Register of Historic Places in 2015.

As a youth, he was taught by a tutor at home, and the primary language was Spanish. When he turned 12, he attended Farley's Presbyterian School in Santa Fe, New Mexico, where he was taught English. His first job was as a mail clerk in Albuquerque, New Mexico. When he was 19 he traveled to Utah, where he worked as a clerk in a trading post in Kanab. However, in 1872 he had some type of altercation in Panguitch, Utah, which left him injured, and he fled south where he stayed with some Paiute Indians until he recovered. After his recovery he continued south into Hopi territory, in what would become the Hopi Reservation. In the summer of 1873 he became the first white man to witness the Hopi's Snake-Antelope Ceremony. Over the next year he worked at a trading post near Fort Wingate, New Mexico, and at the Navajo Agency at Fort Defiance, Arizona. During this time he also learned to speak Navajo, and because of that skill, he was hired by the army to work as an interpreter between the Navajo and Indian agent W. F. M. Arny in 1874.

In 1876 he moved to St. Johns, Arizona, where he established a trading post. Two years later, he purchased a trading post near Pueblo Colorado Wash, owned by William Leonard. In order to avoid confusion with Pueblo, Colorado, he renamed the location Ganado, after Ganado Mucho, a Navajo chief, who had been one of the signers of the Navajo peace treaty of 1868. It was this site which today is known as the Hubbell Trading Post National Historic Site.

During the years 1876–1886, he developed a trading business in the area around and between St. Johns, Ganado, Albuquerque and Gallup, New Mexico. He continued to run the trading posts in both St. Johns and Ganado, and centered his wholesale and shipping operations in Gallup. He and his partner, Clinton N. Cotton, developed significant Navajo craft items, such as concho belts and turquoise bracelets, as well as leaving a lasting impression on the "Ganado blanket", which relied more on traditional colors than the bright aniline dyes which other trading posts were using at that time. He also discouraged the use of cotton in the blankets due to shrinkage issues. By the early 1900s, the Fred Harvey Company made an agreement to buy all of the Ganado blankets to be used in their Albuquerque location. In his book, The Indian Traders, Frank McNitt said, “All authorities agree that Hubbell did as much as any trader, and more than most, to improve the quality of Navaho weaving.” While Hubbell was serving as the sheriff for Apache County, followed by his stint in the Territorial Legislature, Cotton was the primary manager of the trading posts.

In 1895, after leaving the Territorial Legislature, Hubbell brought Cotton out, becoming the sole proprietor of the trading and distribution business. From 1896 through 1912 his businesses prospered and grew, ultimately expanding to more than 30 trading posts in and around the Hopi and Navajo Reservations. In addition he owned and ran several freight/mail lines, numerous farm and ranch properties, a tour operation, and curio shops. As part of his operations, he had warehouses in both Gallup, New Mexico and Winslow, Arizona. Hubbell helped many Navajos become economically self-sufficient by showing them the patterns of blankets most likely to sell for a profit. He was well respected in the Navajo community for his fair dealings with them.

He married Lena Rubi in 1879, the daughter of Cruz Rubi, a prominent Arizona Hispanic pioneer, and they remained married until her death in 1913, although the two lived apart most of the time. They had two sons, Lorenzo Jr. and Roman, and two daughters, Adele and Barbara. In 1902, Hubbell initiated a mail order catalog for his trading post. Between 1902 and 1908, Hubbell began a large irrigation project at his Ganado location. The project included a diversion dam, with headworks, a 2.5 to 3 mile long canal from the Rio Pueblo Colorado to his ranch/trading post, flumes, bridges and extensive ditches. The surface of the canal was seven feet wide, tapering to five feet at its bottom.

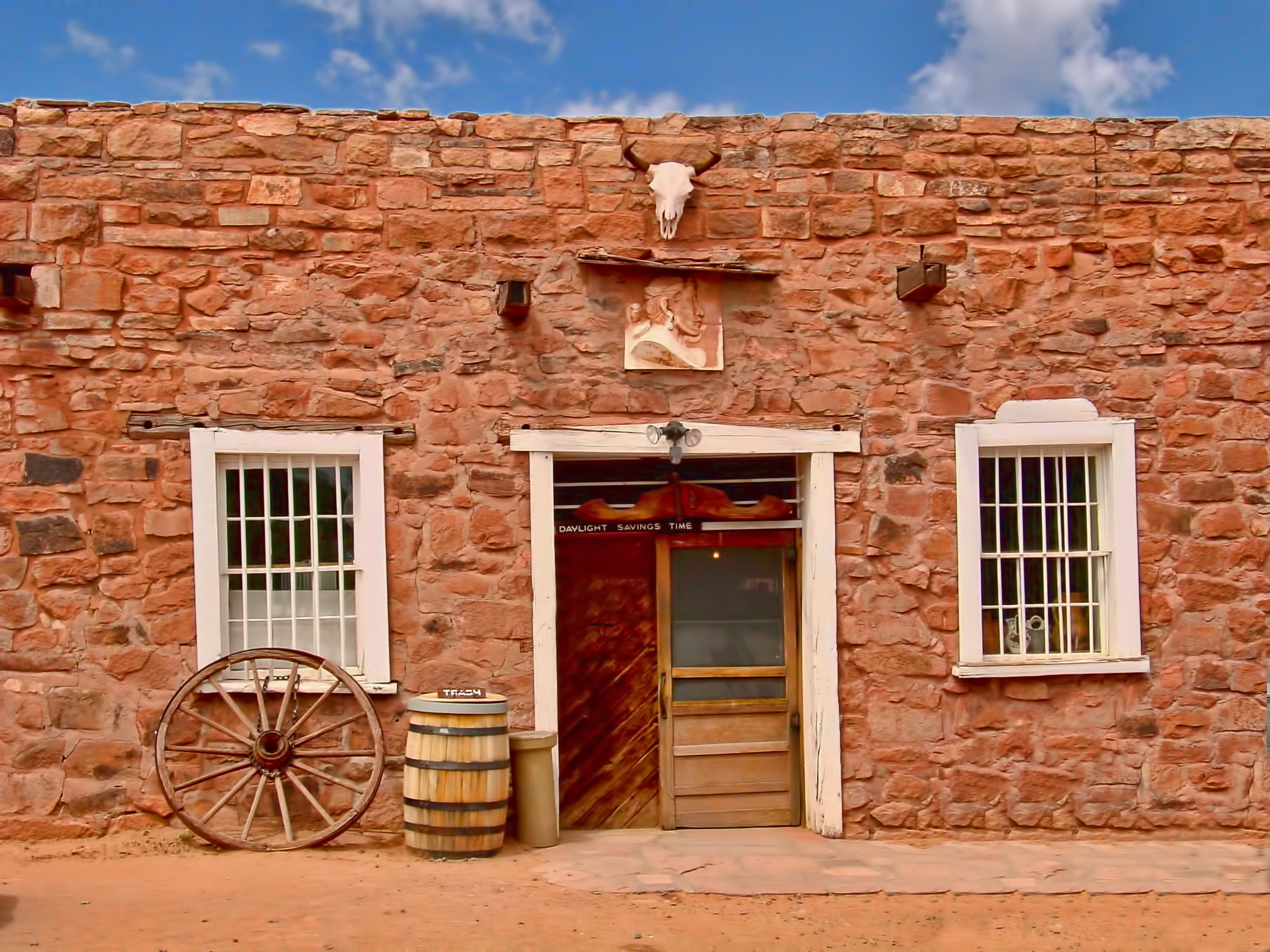
Hubbell Trading Post National Historic Site

== Political career ==
Hubbell served as the sheriff of Apache County in the mid-1880s, serving two consecutive terms beginning in 1882. In 1893 he was elected to the 17th Arizona Territorial Legislature. During this session, Hubbell proposed and successfully shepherded a bill through the legislature, revamping water rights in Arizona, which was a huge issue.

He was part of the Arizona territorial delegation who initially supported Taft over Teddy Roosevelt in the 1900 election. In September 1900 he was the Apache County delegate to the territorial Republican convention, held in Phoenix. By 1907 he was the Justice of the Peace in Keams Canyon. In 1908 he once again represented Apache County at the Republican territorial convention. After it was apparent that the main body intended to endorse Teddy Roosevelt, Governor Kibbey led the Maricopa delegation from the hall. He wanted to nominate Taft, due to the Roosevelt administrations intent to only allow the combined territory of New Mexico and Arizona to enter the union as a single state. Hubbell was the first non-Maricopa delegate to stand with Kibbey and leave the proceedings. They adjourned to the Santa Rita hotel, where they held an alternate convention. While the regular convention voted to cast their votes at the convention for Roosevelt, the alternate convention decided to have their delegates vote for Taft. Both groups sent delegations to the national Republican convention in Chicago.

With statehood on the horizon, Hubbell was expected to become the chairman or the state's Republican Party. He became the chairman of the Territorial Republican Committee in 1911, and after statehood was re-elected as chairman of the State Republican Committee in October 1912. Hubbell was one of the Arizona politicians present in Washington D. C. when President Taft signed the proclamation granting Arizona statehood on February 14, 1912. He was a strong supporter of women's suffrage, and campaigned for it to be included as a plank in the Republicans' state platform in 1912. He also led the Arizona Republicans to support William Howard Taft during the Republican primaries.

In 1911 Hubbell was elected to the 1st Arizona State Legislature as the senator from Apache County. During the first regular session and the first special session Hubbell was the minority leader in the Senate, And was re-affirmed in that role for the 2nd special session. In 1913, he authored a bill to ensure a living wage for all women in the State of Arizona. In May 1913, Hubbell was the deciding vote on approving a bill which enabled several counties to pay off the debt they incurred in building railroads. The bill called for selling 1 million acres of land which had been granted in the statehood act, in order to raise the funds.

Politically, he was at odds with Governor Hunt. In August 1913, however, he invited Hunt, along with Teddy Roosevelt to stay with him at his ranch. Hubbell had vehemently opposed support for Roosevelt during the 1912 election, but speculation did not determine the nature of the meeting, nor its outcome. This might have been the opening attempt by Hubbell to gain reconciliation between the Republican Party and the Progressive Party, for in November 1913 he was in negotiations with Robert S. Fisher, the leader of the Progressives in Arizona, to reach some type of accommodation between the two parties.

In April 1914, Hubbell announced his intention to run for the U. S. Senate seat from Arizona later that year. The announcement came from Washington D. C., where Hubbell had met with Hoval A. Smith and Ralph Cameron. Cameron had served as Arizona's territorial delegate to Congress, while Smith was very influential with Republican politics in Arizona. Hubbell had hoped to reunite the Republicans with the Bull Moose Party, but in a meeting in Phoenix in late April, the Progressives refused to amalgamate with the Republicans, and decided to put forth their own ticket. However, there was a split amongst the Progressives, with Dwight B. Heard heading one wing, and George U. Young, the mayor of Phoenix, the other. Young and his supporters had not been at the meeting in Phoenix, and after meeting with Hubbell in May, they announced that they would be forming a Republican/Progressive coalition. The agreement called for Hubbell to run for Senate, while Young would run for governor. Shortly after this announcement was made in the papers, however, Young put out a statement denying that any such agreement with Hubbell had been reached. Running unopposed in the Republican primary, Hubbell became the Republican nominee for Senate in September 1914. While running for the Senate, Hubbell was re-elected as the Republican state chairman. In the general election Hubbell came in a distant second in a 5-way race, losing to Marcus A. Smith 25,800 to 9,183.

In 1916 Hubbell was selected as one of six electors from Arizona for the 1916 presidential election.

== Personal life ==
Hubbell became a long time friend of Teddy Roosevelt, who stayed with Hubbell at his ranch for a week after attending the Hopi Snake Dances in 1912. Hubbell's brother, Frank A. Hubbell ran on the Republican ticket for the U.S. Senate from New Mexico in the 1916 election. His older brother, Charles, ran a trading post about 45 miles northeast of Flagstaff. In March 1919 he was murdered, and his body burnt in a fire which destroyed the trading post in an attempt to cover up the murder. Two Navajo Indians were suspected of the murder, and a posse was formed to bring them in. Hubbell and his son, Lorenzo Hubbell Jr., joined the posse. Two brothers, 19 and 24, with the last name of Bega, were arrested for the murder and confessed. Their father had turned them in. In 1927 he suffered a stroke, which plagued him the remainder of his life. He died on November 12, 1930, at his home in Ganado. He was buried on Hubbell Hill, next to his wife, and their long-term friend, Chief Many Horses. Another of his trading posts, purchased by Hubbell in Winslow, Arizona in 1921, is listed on the National Register of Historic Places.

The Navajos called him Nak’eznilih, meaning "double glasses" early in life, but later on knew him as Naakaii Saani, "Old Mexican". Many others in Arizona, as well as visitors to his ranch knew him as "Don" Lorenzo, due to his widely known hospitality and generosity. Hamlin Garland coined the phrase, “Don Lorenzo the Magnificent”. He met every U.S. president from Grover Cleveland to Warren G. Harding. He also hosted many notable people at his ranch in Ganado, which held an extensive collection of Native American art. In addition to Roosevelt, some of the others included Jesse Walter Fewkes and Maynard Dixon.

He was successful at trading due to his honesty, integrity, and his knowledge and honoring of Navajo traditions and customs. He made friends with many tribal leaders including Manuelito and Henry Chee Dodge, who loaned Hubbell tens of thousands of dollars as his trading empire began to fail during the Great Depression. Other Navajo tribal leaders he counted as friends and advisers included Many Horses and Ganado Mucho. He espoused his philosophy of trading in his autobiography, Fifty Years an Indian Trader: "The first duty of an Indian trader, in my belief, is to look after the material welfare of his neighbors; to advise them to produce that which their natural inclinations and talent best adapts them; to treat them honestly and insist upon getting the same treatment from them . . . to find a market for their production of same, and advise them which commands the best price. This does not mean that the trader should forget that he is to see that he makes a fair profit for himself, for whatever would injure him would naturally injure those with whom he comes in contact." Long after his death, in the 1960s, when there was unrest amongst political activists due to the current Indian traders, they used Hubbell as a model for what an Indian trader should be.

== See also ==
- Navajo Trading Posts

Party political offices
Preceded by Hoval A. Smith	Republican nominee for U.S. Senator from Arizona (Class 3); 1914	Succeeded by Ralph H. Cameron
