= Bluff War =

Armed conflict between the USA and Native Americans 1914–1915

- Part of the Ute Wars, Navajo Wars
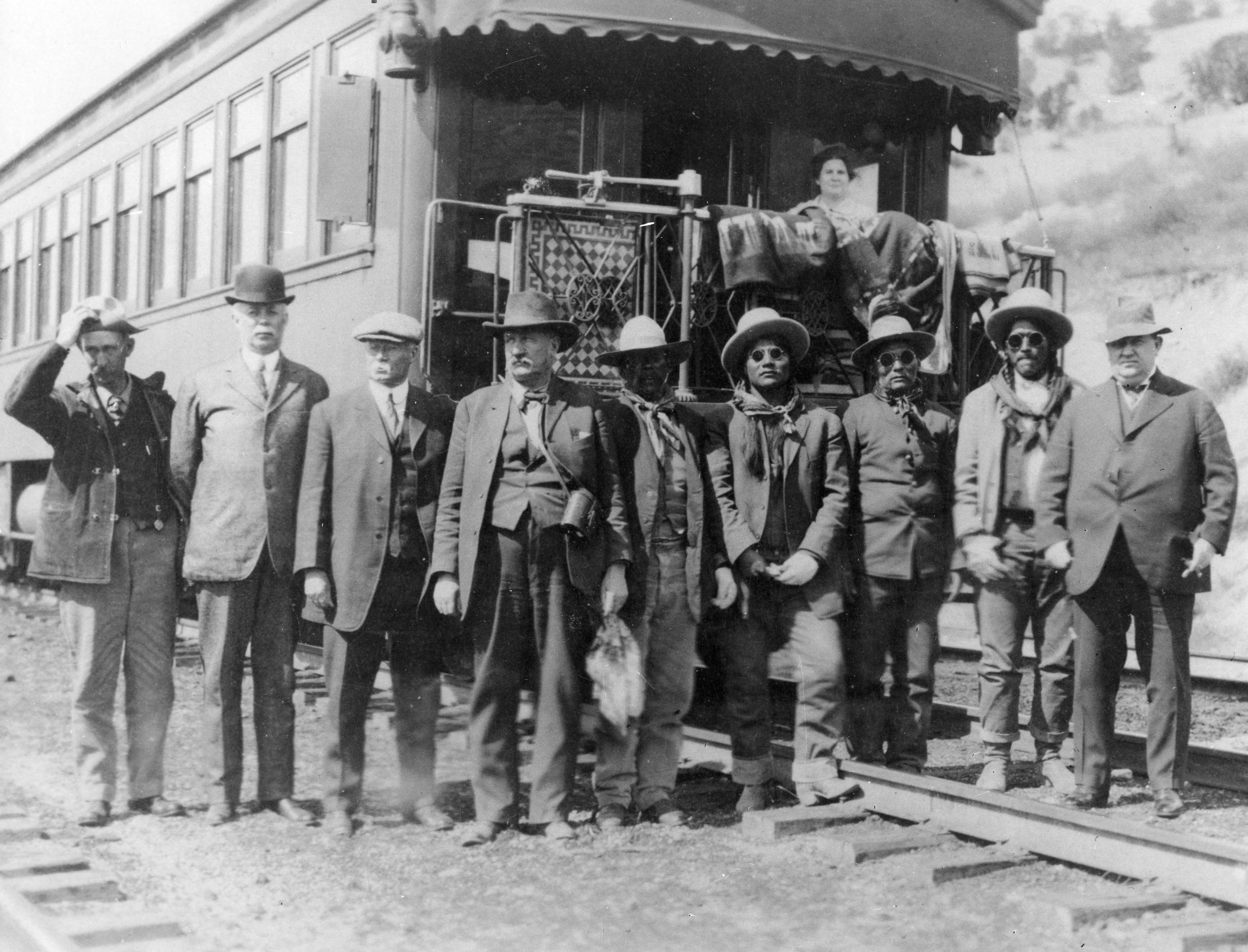
- Participants in the Bluff War in Thompson, Utah, waiting to board a train for a trial in Salt Lake City. Photo from left to right: Lorenzo Creel, Colonel Michie, General Scott, Marshal Nebeker, Old Polk, Jeff Posey, Chief Posey, Tse-ne-gat, A.B. Apperson. The Indians are wearing dark glasses they had been given.
Date	March 1914 – March 11, 1915
Location	San Juan County, Utah; Montezuma County, Colorado
Result	United States victory; Native Americans surrender

Belligerents
United States	Ute; Paiute

Commanders and leaders
(United States) Hugh L. Scott	Polk; Posey

Casualties and losses
~2 killed ~5 wounded	~2 killed ~2 wounded ~160 captured
- Civilian Casualties 2 killed

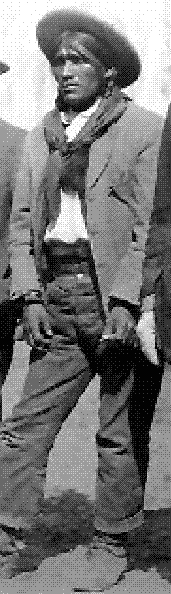
Tse-ne-gat, also known as Everett Hatch

The Bluff War, also known as Posey War of 1915, or the Polk and Posse War, was one of the last armed conflicts between the United States and Ute and Paiute Native Americans (Indians) in Utah. In March 1914, several Utes accused Tse-ne-gat (also known as Everett Hatch), the son of the Paiute Chief Narraguinnep ("Polk"), of murdering a shepherd named Juan Chacon. When a posse attempted to arrest Tse-ne-gat in February 1915, the Paiute and Ute bands headed by Polk and Posey resisted and several people on both sides were killed or wounded. The conflict took place near the town of Bluff, Utah. In March 1915, after negotiations, Polk surrendered Tse-ne-gat to U.S. Army General Hugh L. Scott. In July 1915 he was found not guilty of murder in a trial in Denver.

== Background ==
In the early 20th century the rugged desert country north of the San Juan River in southeastern Utah was occupied by several bands of Ute and Paiute Indians. The band of "Chief Posey" consisted of about 100 men, women, and children. The band of "Old Polk" consisted of about 85 people. They were among the last Native American people in the continental United States to roam freely, unconfined by an Indian Reservation. Their hunting and gathering livelihood, however, was under threat because of the migration of Mormon cattle ranchers and sheep-herding Navajos into their territory. Since the first Anglo settlements in the region about 1880 a number of clashes between the two groups had taken place. The U.S. Army, which had attempted to keep peace between the Anglos and the Indians, was withdrawn from the region during the 1890s. The Anglos occupied the best lands and claimed scarce sources of water and the Utes often stole or butchered Anglo livestock or were destitute and begged for food. By contrast with the Native American population of a few hundred, the non-Indian population of San Juan County where the conflict occurred was 2,377 in 1910 and increasing.

In May 1914, two Ute Indians reported to the superintendent of the Ute Mountain Indian Reservation in Colorado that they had found a body near the New Mexico and Utah borders. Subsequent investigation identified the body as Juan Chacon, a Hispanic sheep-herder. Five witnesses came forward and made statements that pointed to Tse-ne-gat, 27 years old, as the murderer. The superintendent asked Tse-ne-gat to visit him to discuss the incident, but he didn't do so. In September, a deputy U.S. Marshall confronted Tse-ne-gat in Bluff, Utah, but didn't arrest him, fearing violence from the Utes in the area if he did so. In October, Tse-ne-gat and his father Polk met with traders John and Louisa Wade Wetherill. Tse-ne-gat told them he was innocent. The Wetherills believed him and told him to tell his story to the superintendent. However, warned he would be arrested, Tse-ne-gat went into hiding.

On 14 October 1914, Tse-ne-gat was indicted for murder by a grand jury in Denver. Meanwhile, the citizens of San Juan County were petitioning the government to "relieve the good people of the County of the burden of being preyed upon by a reckless bunch of Indians." The Utes said that the issue was being inflamed by local settlers who wished to eliminate them from the area. In February 1915, U.S. Marshall Aquila Nebeker began to assemble a posse, but found few volunteers in Bluff. Instead, he collected 26 men in Colorado. Many of them were described as "boozefighters, gamblers, and bootleggers." Polk's band probably had about 25 adult men and they were camped along the San Juan River on the outskirts of the town of Bluff. Chief Posey's band was camped near Sand Island 5 km (3.1 miles) west of Bluff. Nebeker ignored pleas for caution and attestations to the good character of Tse-ne-gat.

== Battle of Cottonwood Gulch ==
On the early morning of 20 February 1915, Nebeker and his posse of 26 "cowboys" encircled Poke's camp where Tse-ne-gat was present. The posse advanced without warning or identifying itself, or attempting to serve a warrant. The Indians opened fire on the Anglos and in the first minutes of the conflict one member of the posse was killed. Chief Posey came to the aid of Polk, killed one member of the posse and trapped five members on a hilltop. They escaped and left the fighting. Other members of the posse went into Bluff to eat breakfast and Polk moved to the hills overlooking the town of Bluff. From there the Utes and Paiutes could have shot at townspeople in the streets of Bluff, but refrained from doing so. One unarmed Ute was killed by the posse and a father and his six-year-old daughter were wounded. Six of the Utes were captured and incarcerated in the town. One attempted to escape and was killed. Utes living in the town of Bluff and not part of Pokes or Posey's bands fled the town in fear of their lives. Others, including a group of "106 friendly Utes" came to Bluff to avoid being identified as part of the warring Utes and Paiutes. Navajo policemen attempted to escort the Utes to the reservation in Colorado, but they refused to go and threatened instead to join Poke's band.

Although the shooting had ceased, Nebeker requested help from the towns of Grayson (Blanding) and Monticello and 46 armed men arrived in Bluff to join his posse. Twenty Navajo policemen arrived on February 25 to join Nebeker. Newspapers portrayed the town of Bluff as surrounded by hostile Indians. Nebeker sent a Ute named Mancos Jim out to meet with Polk and demand his surrender which Polk refused to give. Indian agent Lorenzo Creel also arrived in Bluff on 25 February he and another agent named Jenkins persuaded 60 Utes to be escorted to the Ute Reservation in Colorado for their safety. Creel described Nebeker's posse as "a bunch of greenhorns" and said they and the citizens of Bluff "did not seem able to draw the line between combatant and peaceful Indians." He recommended that the U.S. army be brought in to resolve the conflict. On 1 March, Nebeker said his posse, now numbering more than 70, faced 50 Utes and Paiutes of which fifteen to twenty men were combatants. Another 165 Indians in the area were peaceful

== Surrender and trial ==
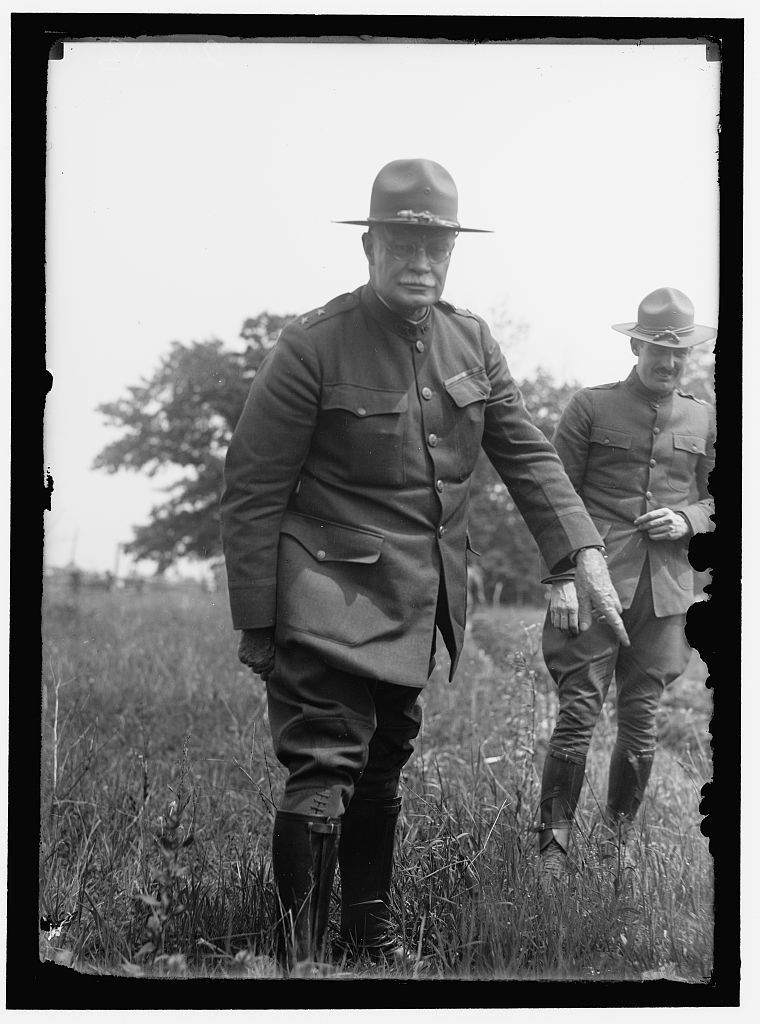
General Hugh L. Scott at Camp Dix, New Jersey in 1918.

Upon receiving orders from Washington, General Hugh L. Scott traveled from his post in Virginia City to Bluff, to negotiate an end to the war. Prior to Scott's arrival, a delegation of Indians, including "Old Polk," Tse-ne-gat's father, had visited John and Louisa Wade Wetherill, proprietors of the Navajo trading post at Kayenta, and asked them to mediate the conflict. John Wetherill accompanied one of the Indians to meet with Scott to set up a meeting with Polk and Posey.

On March 11, 1915, Scott left Bluff with Wetherill, several Navajos and his aides, to meet Polk and Posey at Mexican Hat. The group was unarmed. Scott described the journey:

We reached Bluff on March 10 and learned that the Indians had gone to the Navajo Mountains, 125 miles southwest of Bluff. We stayed a day in Bluff and then went on to Mexican Hat. Some friendly Navajos met me at Mexican Hat and went ahead of me to tell Poke's band of my coming...Jim Boy, a friendly Paiute, was sent out to tell the Paiutes that I wanted to see them. Some of them came near where I was camped, but it wasn't until the third day that anyone dared to come to the camp. Posey and four other Indians then came in. We talked a little through a Navajo interpreter...They helped us kill a beef and we gave them a good meal, the first they'd had in weeks. We also gave them some blankets. Posey and his men didn't have any weapons, but I have reason to suspect that they had hidden them nearby. The next day, Polk and Hatch [Tse-ne-gat] and about 25 others came to see me...I said that I didn't think they would like to have their children chased by soldiers and cowboys all over the mountains and killed and that I wanted to help them. I didn't try to push the matter with them, but asked them what they wanted to do. After they had talked among themselves, they said they would do anything I wanted them to do.

Polk, Posey, and Posey's son Jess agreed to surrender Tse-ne-gat, and Scott promised to accompany all four of them to Salt Lake City to ensure they had a fair trial. Scott feared that the four of them would be "legally murdered." Boarding the train in Moab, Scott and the Utes found that they were celebrities. Newspaper reporters followed the journey and a large crowd in Salt Lake City greeted their arrival. The Indians were taken for automobile rides, attended Mormon religious services, and allowed to walk around the city. Tse-ne-gat, who was suffering from tuberculosis, was sent to Denver to await trial. The other imprisoned Utes and Paiutes were soon released. Louisa Wade Wetherill, the Kayenta trader, journeyed more than 50 miles (80 km) by wagon to find character witnesses for Tse-ne-gat and secured the testimony of several Utes and Anglos, including two Mormons, in his defense. Wetherill and the witnesses journeyed to Denver for the trial. Billed as "the most thrilling criminal trial ever held in Denver," Tse-ne-gat's trial began 6 July 1915. He was acquitted on 15 July, a verdict was which applauded by many, including the Indian agent Jenkins and the Indian Rights Association. General Scott, who was not at the trial, believed Tse-ne-gat innocent. A not inconsiderable issue at the trial was fear by the Anglos that a guilty verdict would set off an Indian war. Well-wishers, mostly women, gave Tse-ne-gat many gifts and he was given a "dramatic farewell" when he departed Denver by train the following day.

== Consequences ==
Tse-ne-gat died, age 39, of tuberculosis eleven years after the trial. The Ute and Paiute chiefs, Polk and Posey, had pledged to live on the Ute Reservation in Colorado, but unwelcome there and without any means of subsistence they soon returned to an untenable nomadic life amidst a growing Anglo population which controlled most resources. They survived partly on handouts from the people of southeastern Utah and cattle rustling for food. "From the white man's perspective, the Indians were a nuisance at best and a threat at worst." The animosity between Anglo and Indian would eventually result in the so-called Posey War of 1923.

== See also ==
- Paiute War

== Bibliography ==
- Young, Richard K. (1997). The Ute Indians of Colorado in the twentieth century. University of Oklahoma Press. ISBN 0-8061-2968-9.
- Roberts, David (2008). Living With Wolves. Braided River. ISBN 978-1-59485-004-2.
