= Oljato Trading Post =

Historic trading post in Utah, United States

- U.S. National Register of Historic Places
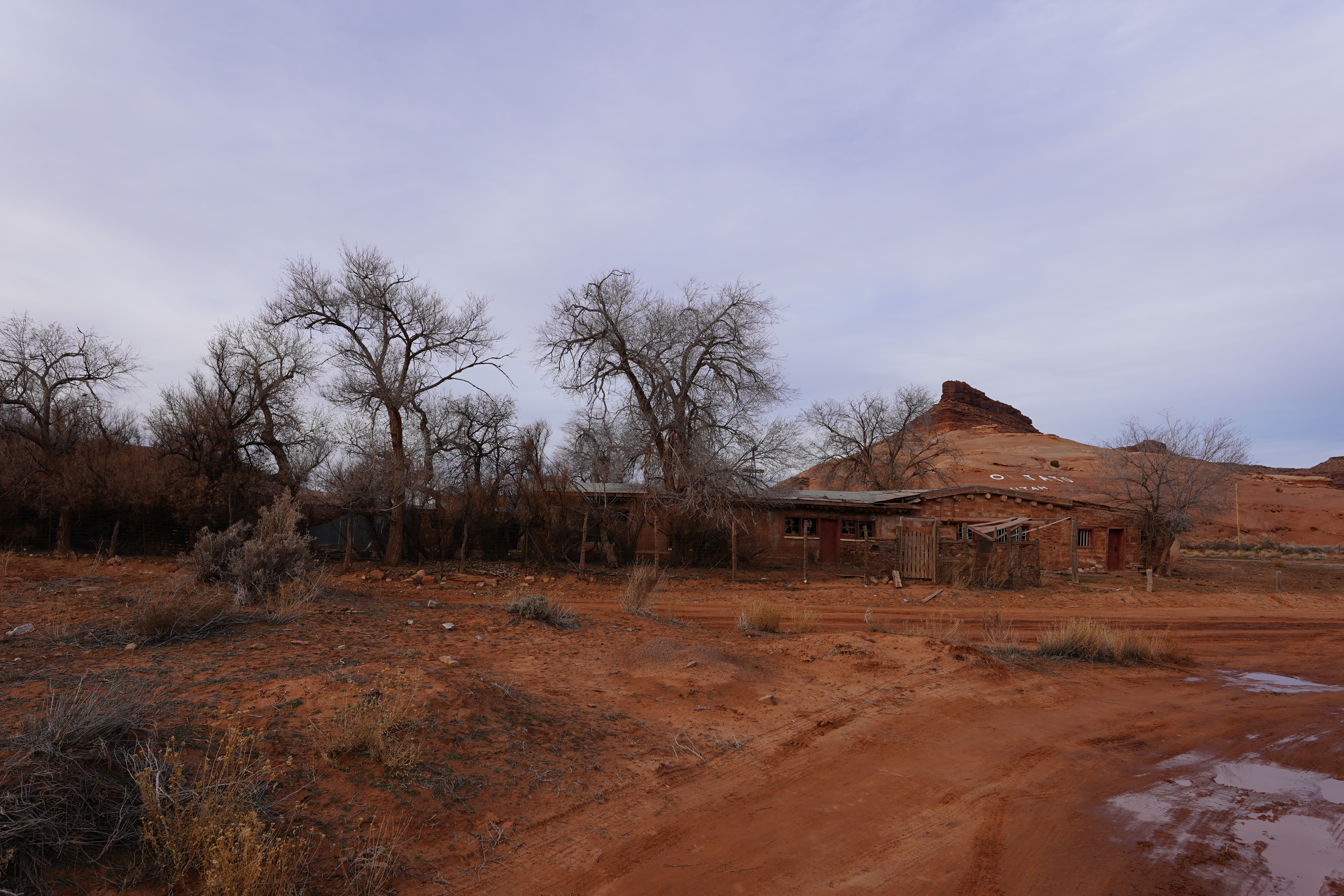

- Location within Utah Location within the United States
- Location: Oljato Road, Oljato-Monument Valley, Utah
- Coordinates: 37.036317°N 110.318205°W
- Built: 1921
- NRHP reference No.: 80003939
- Added to NRHP: June 20, 1980

Oljato Trading Post was a trading post located on the western edge of Oljato–Monument Valley, Utah. The site was added to the National Register of Historic Places on June 20, 1980. In 2021, it was named by the National Trust for Historic Preservation in its list of America's Most Endangered Places.

== History ==
The name of Oljato Trading Post comes from the Navajo ‘Oljéé’to’ (“Moonwater”). The trading post was founded in 1906 by John and Louisa Wade Wetherill. Oljato was one of the most isolated places in the United States and the local Navajos had been little influenced by Hispanic and Anglo culture. The Wetherills brought in supplies by horse-drawn wagon from Gallup, New Mexico, a 21-day round trip. The Wetherills moved to Kayenta in 1910. The present day structure was constructed in 1921 by Joseph Hefferman, a licensed Anglo trader, who then sold it in 1936. In the following years the trading post had a series of owners. In 2020 it was stabilized by the State Historic Preservation Office, the Navajo Nation Historic Preservation Department and organizations.

The original structure of the traditional Navajo trading post included designated areas for trading wool and lambs, loading areas for wagons, storage, and an elevated area for overseeing the trading area.

The trading post was a venue for Navajo producers to trade and sell their products. It also served as a social hub in the community.

== See also ==
- Navajo trading posts
