= Louisa Wade Wetherill =

American explorer and trader

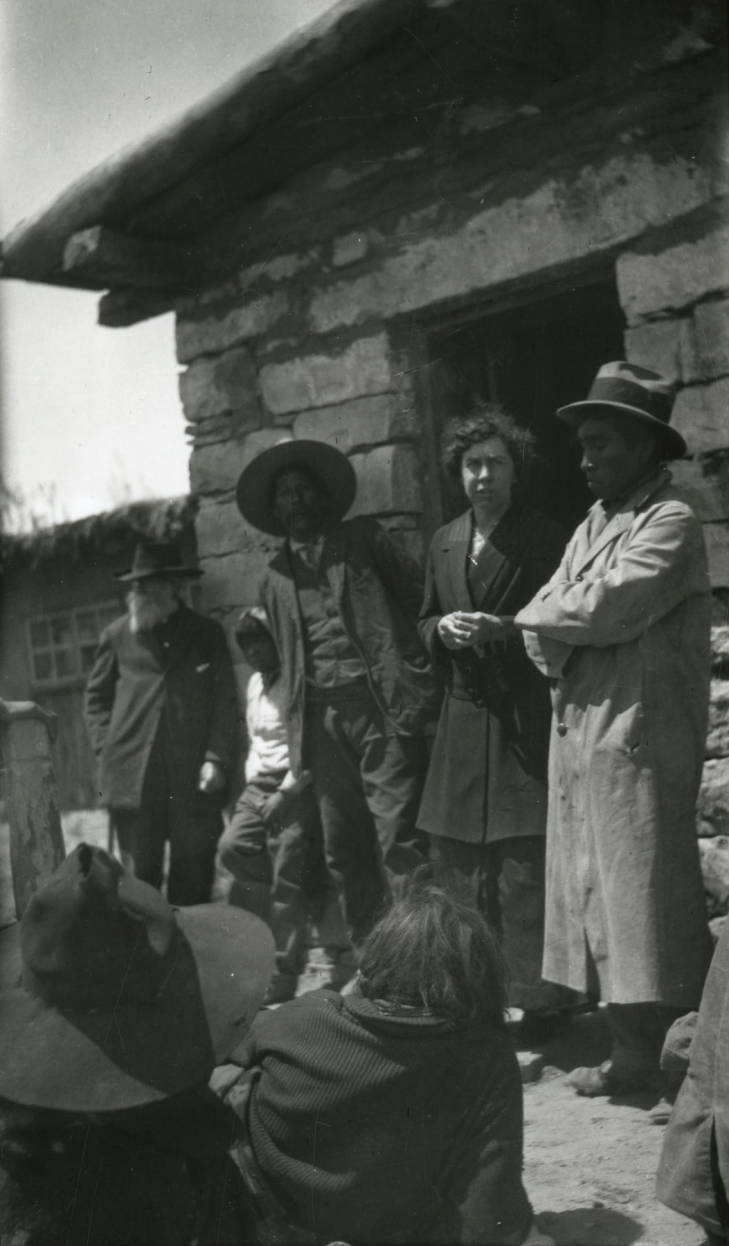
- Wetherhill meeting with Utes to arrange a peaceful end between the Utes and the U.S. Army in the Bluff War.
- Born: 2 September 1877; Elko, Elko County, Nevada, US
- Died: 18 September 1945 (aged 68); Prescott, Arizona
- Other names: Asthon Sosi; Slim Woman; Louisa Wade

Louisa Wade Wetherill (2 September 1877 – 18 September 1945) lived with her husband and children in remote trading posts among the Navajo people in New Mexico, Utah, and Arizona for more than 25 years and became an authority on Navajo culture. She spoke the Navajo language and became expert in medicinal herbs and plants known to the Navajo, art, especially sandpainting, traditional stories, and weaving. She was known by the Navajo as Asthon Sosi or "Slim Woman."

== Early life and family ==
Mary Louise Wade was born 2 September 1877 in Wells, Nevada. She was the daughter of Jack Wade, a U.S. Army Captain, and Julia France Rush Wade. When she was about two years old, the family moved to Mancos, Colorado. The Wetherill family lived nearby. When she was eighteen, Louisa married 30 year old John Wetherill on 17 March 1896. John Wetherill was one of several brothers who became interested in the ruins and artifacts left by the Ancestral Puebloans who had lived six hundred years earlier at Mesa Verde, a few miles south of the Wetherill ranch. John's older brother was Richard Wetherill, a prominent amateur archaeologist. The couple had a son, Benjamin (born 26 December 1896) and a daughter, Georgia who was called "Sister" (born 17 January 1898).

The Wetherills lived on a 160 acres (65 ha) farm near Mancos, but husband John's main interest was the abundant remains of the ancient Puebloans in the area. To supplement his income, he guided scholars to the ruins and to visit the many tribes of Native Americans (Indians) living on reservations in New Mexico and Arizona. Louisa stayed home with the children and managed the farm.

== Ojo Alamo ==
In 1900, Richard Wetherill offered John the job of managing the Ojo Alamo Trading post, 20 miles (32 km) northwest of the ancient Puebloan ruins in Chaco Canyon, New Mexico. In November 1900, the Wetherill family and their long-time partner, Clyde Colville, journeyed to Ojo Alamo ("Cottonwood Tree Spring") by horse-drawn wagon and became the only Anglo people in a large desert area. The trading post was surrounded by the hogans of Navajo families and only one Navajo woman living nearby spoke English. John was away a good deal of the time pursuing his interests, and Louisa was left managing the trading post. The transformative experience for her was an invitation to see a Navajo sand painting and the accompanying ceremony. In her words, she "set herself to learn" about the Navajo and began to study the language and culture. She soon became known to the Navajo as Asthon Sosi, the "Slim Woman."

== Oljato Trading Post ==
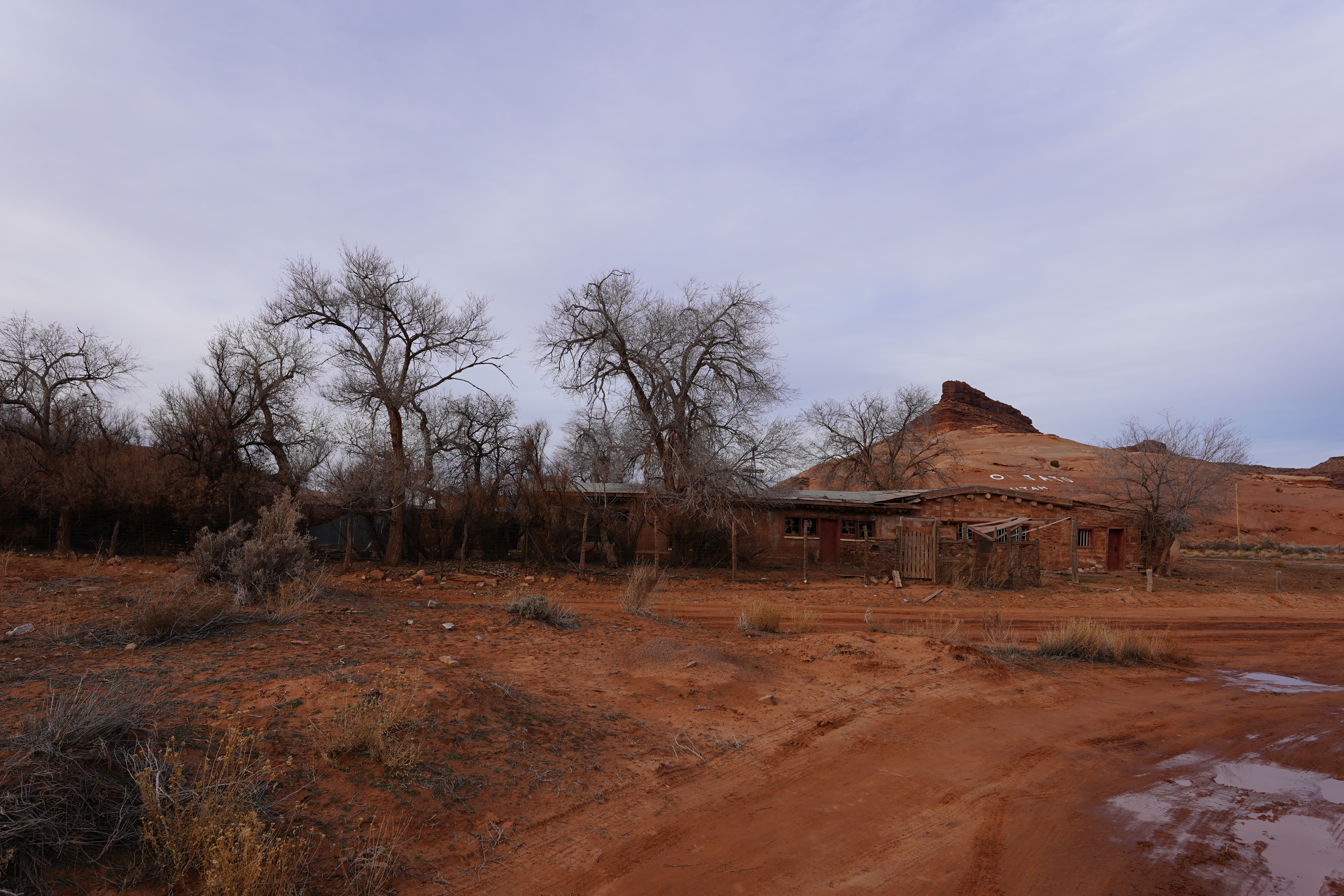
The ruins of Oljato in 2019.

In 1906, John Wetherill established Oljato Trading Post in Monument Valley, Utah (sometimes known as Oljetoh). It was the first trading post that the Wetherills owned and was said to be located further from a railroad than any other occupied place in the United States. Scholar Frank McNitt described it as the "loneliest of desert outposts." Oljato was a "cottonwood tree, a spring of water and lone house." Mail was delivered once a week and supplies arrived by ox-cart from Gallup, New Mexico requiring 21 days for the round-trip. Louisa studied medicinal herbs with a sheepherder and medicine man named "Wolfkiller." She wrote a biography of Wolfkiller which was only published long after her death. She continued her studies of Navajo sand paintings. A Navajo named "Yellow Singer" reproduced for her many of the sand paintings on paper with crayons. The Wetherill's also had contact with the Utes and Southern Paiute people who visited the trading post.

To establish their trading post the Wetherill's secured the permission of a wealthy local Navajo chief named Hoskinini. Louisa became a trusted friend and "granddaughter" of Hoskinini. When he died in 1909, she found herself the distributor of his property and the reluctant caretaker of his 32 Ute slaves, all women. She initially gave the Ute women a herd of Hoskinini's sheep and sent them on their way, but a few months later they had lost or given away all their sheep, and she accepted responsibility for them, allowing the Ute women to live near the trading post and feeding them in exchange for their labor.

== Kayenta ==
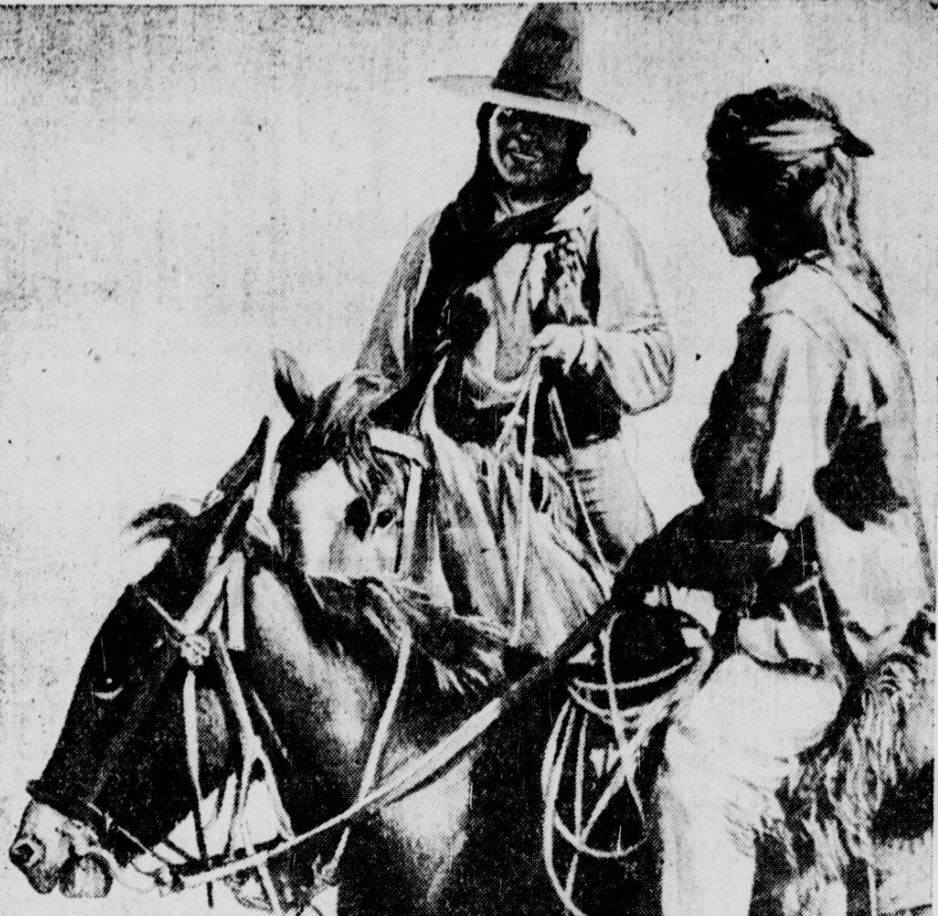
Tse-ne-gat in 1915. Photo by Zane Grey.

In 1910, the Wetherill's moved and established a new trading post at Todanestya, "the place where water runs like fingers out of a hill," 20 miles (32 km) south of Oljato. The new location was less isolated and became better known as Kayenta. Over time, the Wetherills expanded their house into a lodge for visitors and they welcomed a parade of prominent visitors, especially after Louisa's husband, John, and trading partner Clyde Colville constructed a rough road in 1914 and automobile travel to Kayenta became easier. One of the visitors was Theodore Roosevelt in 1913 who said of Louisa and the Navajo: "Mrs. Wetherill was not only versed in archaeological lore concerning ruins...she...knows their language; she knows their minds; she has the keenest sympathy not only with their bodily needs, but with their mental and spiritual processes." The parade of visitors included author Oliver La Farge, anthropologist Clyde Kluckhohn, author Zane Grey, painter Jimmy Swinnerton, film makers John Huston and John Ford, and reformer John Collier.

In 1914, a Ute Indian, Tse-ne-gat, also known as Everett Hatch, was accused of killing Juan Chacon, a Mexican shepherd. Tse-ne-gat met with Louisa Wetherill in Kayenta and said he was innocent. She told him to tell his story to the Indian agent. However, warned he would be arrested, Tse-ne-gat went into hiding. In February 1915, in what is called the Bluff War a posse of 26 men tried to arrest Tse-ne-gat near Bluff, Utah. Several Utes and posse members were killed in the ensuring melee. In the aftermath of the battle, newspaper reports falsely claimed the Wetherills had been massacred by the Utes. In March, a delegation of Utes, including "Old Polk," Tse-ne-gat's father, called on the Wetherills at Kayenta and John Wetherill accompanied one of them to meet with U.S. Army General Hugh L. Scott in Mexican Hat, Utah. After Scott assured them that Tse-ne-gat would get a fair trial, he surrendered. In June 1915, the trial of Tse-ne-gat was pending in Denver. Louisa with several companions journeyed by wagon on a lengthy journey to find witnesses to testify on behalf of Tse-ne-gat. She secured the testimony of several Utes and Anglos, including two Mormons, who accompanied her to Denver. Tse-ne-gat was found innocent for lack of evidence.

== Later life ==
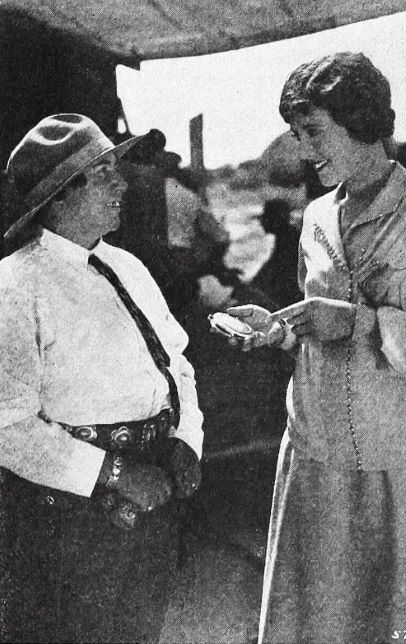
Wetherill (right) was a technical advisor for the 1925 movie The Vanishing American.

Beginning in 1921, Wetherill made several trips to Mexico to investigate a theory that several Navajo clans had migrated northward in pre-Columbian times. The Wetherills began to spend the winters in southern Arizona and established the Rancho de la Osa Guest Ranch in Sasabe in 1926. When her two children grew up, Wetherill fostered three Navajo girls from the Tuba City Boarding School: Esther, Fannie, and Betty Zane. According to her foster daughter Betty, Wetherill ensured the ending of the abuse happening in the boarding school before taking the girls home with her. Wetherill also wrote letters to her friend John Collier about the abuses of Navajo children at the Tuba City school, and Collier undertook a successful campaign for reforms of Indian schools. Esther had tuberculosis and died in 1921 of the flu. The other two girls married. Wetherill's biological daughter, Georgia, was killed by a drunk driver on July 4, 1935, in Mesa, Arizona. When her husband and his business partner died within half a year in 1944 and 1945 Wetherill sold the trading post and moved to a ranch owned by her son, Benjamin, in Skull Valley, Arizona. Wetherill died in nearby Prescott in 1945, less than a year after her husband. She was buried in Kayenta. Benjamin died in 1950.

Wetherill worked with anthropologist Frances Gillmor on her biography. She was inducted into the Arizona Women Hall of Fame in 1985.

== Works ==
- Gillmor, Frances; Wetherill, Louisa Wade (1953). Traders to the Navajos. Albuquerque, New Mexico. ISBN 0826300405.
- Wetherill, Louisa Wade (2007). Wolfkiller : wisdom from a nineteenth-century Navajo Shepherd (First ed.). Salt Lake City. ISBN 9781423600305.
- Wetherill, Louisa Wade (1939). Dancing East of the Sunset.
