= South Valley, New Mexico =

- Census-designated place
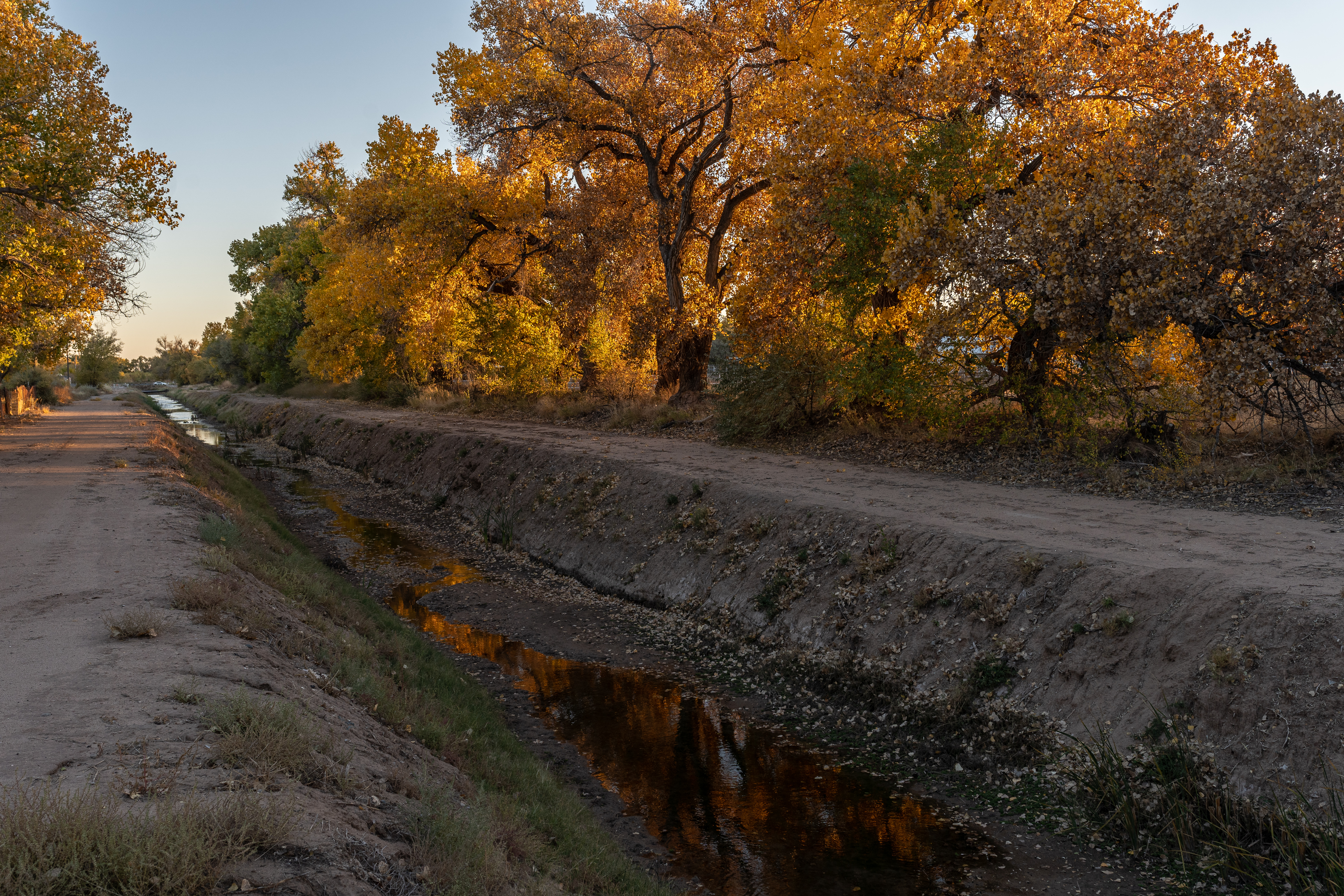
- Looking Southwest down the Los Padillas Drain. The South Valley is home to many such irrigation ditches.

- Location of South Valley, New Mexico

- Location in the United States
- Coordinates: 34°59′32″N 106°41′05″W
- Country: United States
- State: New Mexico
- County: Bernalillo

Area
  - Total: 30.30 sq mi (78.47 km^{2})
  - Land: 29.02 sq mi (75.16 km^{2})
  - Water: 1.28 sq mi (3.31 km^{2})
- Elevation: 4,928 ft (1,502 m)

Population (2020)
  - Total: 38,338
  - Density: 1,321.1/sq mi (510.09/km^{2})
- Time zone: UTC-7 (Mountain (MST))
  - Summer (DST): UTC-6 (MDT)
- Area code: 505
- FIPS code: 35-74520
- GNIS feature ID: 2408776

South Valley is a census-designated place (CDP) and unincorporated community in Bernalillo County, New Mexico, United States. The population was 38,338 at the 2020 Census. It is part of the Albuquerque Metropolitan Statistical Area. The U.S. Postal Service uses "Albuquerque" for all South Valley addresses (ZIP code 87105).

== Geography and environment ==
The South Valley is located in central Bernalillo County and is bordered on the north, east, and half of its west side by the city of Albuquerque. The Rio Grande runs north to south through the center of the CDP.

According to the United States Census Bureau, the CDP has a total area of 30.1 square miles (77.9 km^{2}), of which 28.8 square miles (74.6 km^{2}) is land and 1.3 square miles (3.3 km^{2}), or 4.23%, is water.

Municipal wells San Jose number 3 and San Jose number 6 were decommissioned in 1981 due to contamination with low levels of organic solvents, halocarbons and aromatics. These wells were plugged and abandoned in September 1994. The site remains on the Superfund site list with on-going remedial actions to contain, capture and reduce the concentration of the contaminant plume within the ground water.

== Demographics ==
Historical population
Census	Pop.	Note	%±
2000	39,060		—
2010	40,976		4.9%
2020	38,338		−6.4%
U.S. Decennial Census

=== Racial and ethnic composition ===
South Valley CDP, New Mexico – Racial and ethnic composition Note: the US Census treats Hispanic/Latino as an ethnic category. This table excludes Latinos from the racial categories and assigns them to a separate category. Hispanics/Latinos may be of any race.
Race / Ethnicity (NH = Non-Hispanic)	Pop 2000	Pop 2010	Pop 2020	% 2000	% 2010	% 2020
White alone (NH)	7,480	6,763	6,051	19.15%	16.50%	15.78%
Black or African American alone (NH)	355	346	331	0.91%	0.84%	0.86%
Native American or Alaska Native alone (NH)	459	493	538	1.18%	1.20%	1.40%
Asian alone (NH)	88	109	109	0.23%	0.27%	0.28%
Native Hawaiian or Pacific Islander alone (NH)	15	5	20	0.04%	0.01%	0.05%
Other race alone (NH)	53	101	184	0.14%	0.25%	0.48%
Mixed race or Multiracial (NH)	303	299	452	0.78%	0.73%	1.18%
Hispanic or Latino (any race)	30,307	32,860	30,653	77.59%	80.19%	79.95%
Total	39,060	40,976	38,338	100.00%	100.00%	100.00%

=== 2020 census ===
As of the 2020 census, South Valley had a population of 38,338. The median age was 40.1 years. 22.4% of residents were under the age of 18 and 17.6% of residents were 65 years of age or older. For every 100 females there were 98.4 males, and for every 100 females age 18 and over there were 97.3 males age 18 and over.

98.6% of residents lived in urban areas, while 1.4% lived in rural areas.

There were 13,585 households in South Valley, of which 32.3% had children under the age of 18 living in them. Of all households, 41.4% were married-couple households, 22.4% were households with a male householder and no spouse or partner present, and 27.5% were households with a female householder and no spouse or partner present. About 24.9% of all households were made up of individuals and 11.3% had someone living alone who was 65 years of age or older.

There were 14,721 housing units, of which 7.7% were vacant. The homeowner vacancy rate was 1.4% and the rental vacancy rate was 5.4%.

Racial composition as of the 2020 census
Race	Number	Percent
White	15,111	39.4%
Black or African American	476	1.2%
American Indian and Alaska Native	1,013	2.6%
Asian	170	0.4%
Native Hawaiian and Other Pacific Islander	33	0.1%
Some other race	11,438	29.8%
Two or more races	10,097	26.3%

=== 2000 census ===
As of the census of 2000, there were 40,976 people, 13,802 households, and 10,087 families residing in the CDP. The population density was 1,362.2 inhabitants per square mile (525.9/km^{2}). There were 14,784 housing units at an average density of 491.2 per square mile (189.7/km^{2}). The racial makeup of the CDP was 59.5% White, 1.2% African American, 2.2% Native American, 0.4% Asian, 0.0% Pacific Islander, 32.7% from other races, and 4.0% from two or more races. Hispanic or Latino of any race were 80.2% of the population.

There were 13,802 households, out of which 31.8% had children under the age of 18 living with them, 46.1% were married couples living together, 17.8% had a female householder with no husband present, 9.2% were a male householder with no wife present, and 26.9% were non-families. 21.6% of all households were made up of individuals, and 7.5% had someone living alone who was 65 years of age or older. The average household size was 2.93 and the average family size was 3.4.

In the CDP, the population was spread out, with 26.8% under the age of 18, 6.9% from 20 to 24, 24.9% from 25 to 44, 21.4% from 45 to 64, and 12.3% who were 65 years of age or older. The median age was 35.5 years. For every 100 females, there were 98.8 males. For every 100 females age 18 and over, there were 97.7 males.

The median income for a household in the CDP was $36,821, and the median income for a family was $32,833. Males had a median income of $25,560 versus $21,973 for females. The per capita income for the CDP was $17,045. About 17.4% of families and 25.9% of the population were below the poverty line, including 29.2% of those under age 18 and 17.9% of those age 65 or over.

== Incorporation efforts ==
Presently, the South Valley is an unincorporated area in Bernalillo County that lies south of the city limits of Albuquerque. In January 2010, a special election was held in the South Valley to decide whether or not the region should incorporate into a city, to be named Valle de Atrisco. Voters in the South Valley overwhelmingly rejected incorporation by a 93 to 7 percent margin during the special election on January 5, 2010. Opponents to incorporation cited the potential costs (and tax burden for residents) for providing for education, public works, police and fire services in the South Valley because Bernalillo County would no longer be providing these services to the community following incorporation. Supporters argued in favor of incorporation to protect the community from possible annexation into the City of Albuquerque, and the potential for increased taxes and perceived degradation of public services that would arise from being integrated into the city.

== Education ==
It is zoned to Albuquerque Public Schools.

Rio Grande High School is in the South Valley.
