= Sanders, Arizona =

CDP in Apache County, Arizona

- Census-designated place
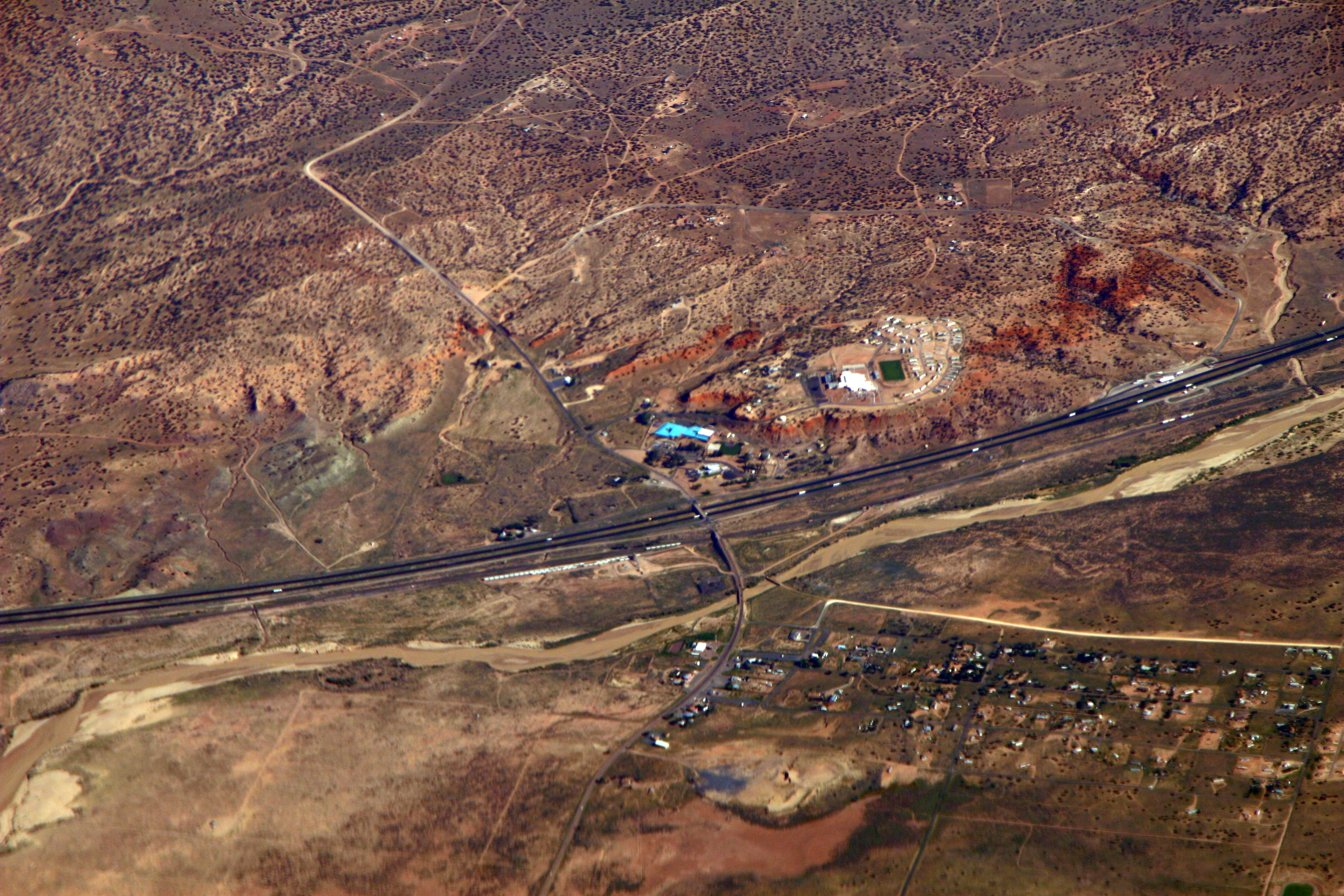
- Sanders and I-40 from the air

- Location within Arizona
- Coordinates: 35°12′32″N 109°19′22″W
- Country: United States
- State: Arizona
- County: Apache
- Established: 1881

Area
  - Total: 2.59 sq mi (6.71 km^{2})
  - Land: 2.59 sq mi (6.70 km^{2})
  - Water: 0 sq mi (0.00 km^{2})
- Elevation: 5,866 ft (1,788 m)

Population (2020)
  - Total: 575
  - Density: 222.2/sq mi (85.78/km^{2})
- Time zone: UTC-07:00 (MST)
- ZIP code: 86512
- FIPS code: 04-63050
- GNIS feature ID: 2582858

Sanders (Navajo: Łichííʼ Deezʼáhí) is a census-designated place (CDP) in Apache County, Arizona, United States. Sanders is located at the junction of U.S. Route 191 and Interstate 40. As of the 2020 census, it had a population of 575.

== History ==
Sanders' English name either comes from C.W. Sanders, a railroad office engineer, or Art Saunders, who had a trading post nearby. The railroad station was named Cheto to avoid confusion with another station named Sanders already on the line.

Sanders is located near Interstate 40 and the BNSF Railway. Old Route 66 runs near the town and some sections of the highway still exist. Sanders is surrounded by the Nahata Dziil and (north of the town) Houck chapters of the Navajo Nation. The latter is made up of local Navajos from the area and relocated Navajo refugees from the Navajo/Hopi land dispute. That dispute relocated hundreds of Navajos to the Sanders area from the western Navajo Nation, mainly around the Hopi partitioned land. The area was mostly ranchland until the U.S. government bought it and added it to the Navajo Nation in 1981.

== Geography ==
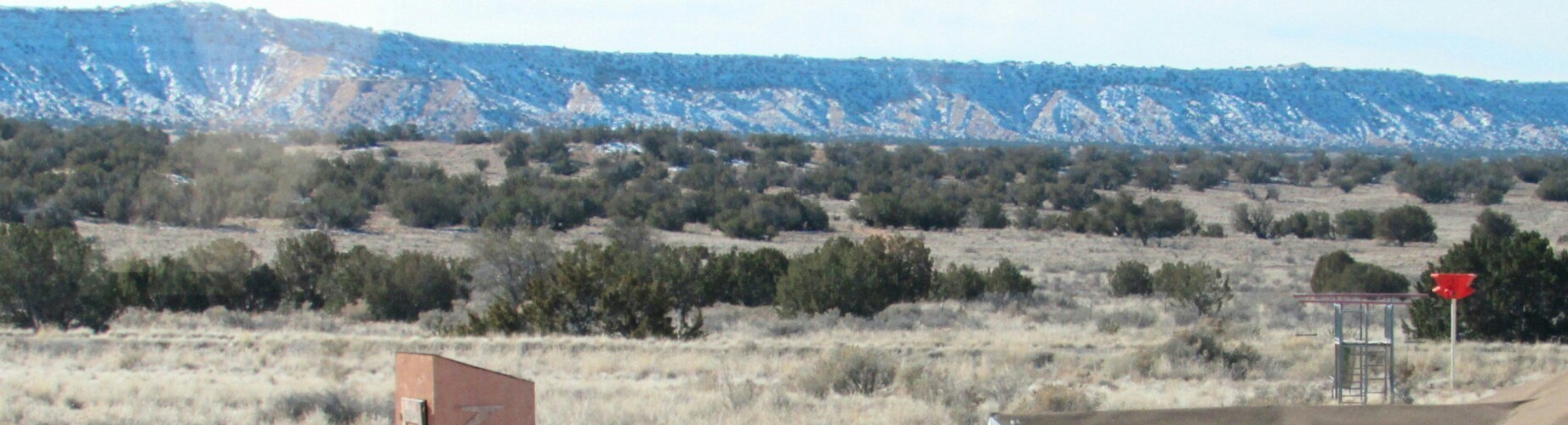
Puerco Valley Ridge

Sanders is located at Exit 339 on Interstate 40. Via I-40 it is 6 miles (10 km) west to Chambers, 53 miles (85 km) west to Holbrook, and 44 miles (71 km) east to Gallup, New Mexico. U.S. Route 191 leads south 54 miles (87 km) to St. Johns.

According to the United States Census Bureau, the Sanders CDP has a total area of 2.4 square miles (6.2 km^{2}), all land.

Sanders is located on the southern edge of the Defiance Plateau, adjacent to the Puerco River with Puerco Ridge visible to the south.

The vegetation of the surrounding region includes juniper, pinón pine and a variety of native plants such as prickly pear cactus and sagebrush.

Wildlife seen in the area include pronghorn, mule deer, elk, mountain lions, black bears, Mexican gray wolves, coyotes and turkeys.

== Climate ==
Sanders has a cold semi-arid climate (Köppen: BSk) with cold winters and hot summers.

Climate data for Sanders, Arizona (1991–2020 normals, extremes 1949–1956 and 1965–present)
Month	Jan	Feb	Mar	Apr	May	Jun	Jul	Aug	Sep	Oct	Nov	Dec	Year
Record high °F (°C)	72 (22)	74 (23)	86 (30)	86 (30)	96 (36)	102 (39)	107 (42)	101 (38)	100 (38)	90 (32)	79 (26)	77 (25)	107 (42)
Mean daily maximum °F (°C)	47.8 (8.8)	52.4 (11.3)	60.2 (15.7)	67.7 (19.8)	77.1 (25.1)	87.6 (30.9)	90.4 (32.4)	88.0 (31.1)	81.9 (27.7)	70.3 (21.3)	58.3 (14.6)	48.1 (8.9)	69.1 (20.6)
Daily mean °F (°C)	33.3 (0.7)	37.4 (3.0)	43.1 (6.2)	49.3 (9.6)	57.5 (14.2)	66.9 (19.4)	73.3 (22.9)	71.9 (22.2)	65.0 (18.3)	53.4 (11.9)	42.0 (5.6)	33.6 (0.9)	52.2 (11.2)
Mean daily minimum °F (°C)	18.9 (−7.3)	22.3 (−5.4)	25.9 (−3.4)	30.9 (−0.6)	38.0 (3.3)	46.2 (7.9)	56.2 (13.4)	55.7 (13.2)	48.2 (9.0)	36.5 (2.5)	25.6 (−3.6)	19.1 (−7.2)	35.3 (1.8)
Record low °F (°C)	−23 (−31)	−22 (−30)	−15 (−26)	5 (−15)	14 (−10)	25 (−4)	35 (2)	32 (0)	20 (−7)	7 (−14)	−18 (−28)	−20 (−29)	−23 (−31)
Average precipitation inches (mm)	0.89 (23)	0.38 (9.7)	0.70 (18)	0.41 (10)	0.32 (8.1)	0.11 (2.8)	1.17 (30)	1.38 (35)	0.53 (13)	0.86 (22)	0.70 (18)	0.71 (18)	8.16 (207)
Average snowfall inches (cm)	0.8 (2.0)	0.7 (1.8)	0.7 (1.8)	0.0 (0.0)	0.0 (0.0)	0.0 (0.0)	0.0 (0.0)	0.0 (0.0)	0.0 (0.0)	0.0 (0.0)	0.3 (0.76)	1.1 (2.8)	3.6 (9.1)
Average precipitation days (≥ 0.01 inch)	2.5	1.5	2.6	1.2	1.6	0.7	5.1	5.2	3.7	2.2	1.7	1.8	29.8
Average snowy days (≥ 0.1 inch)	0.6	0.3	0.2	0.0	0.0	0.0	0.0	0.0	0.0	0.0	0.2	0.4	1.7
Source: NOAA

== Demographics ==
Historical population
Census	Pop.	Note	%±
2010	630		—
2020	575		−8.7%
U.S. Decennial Census

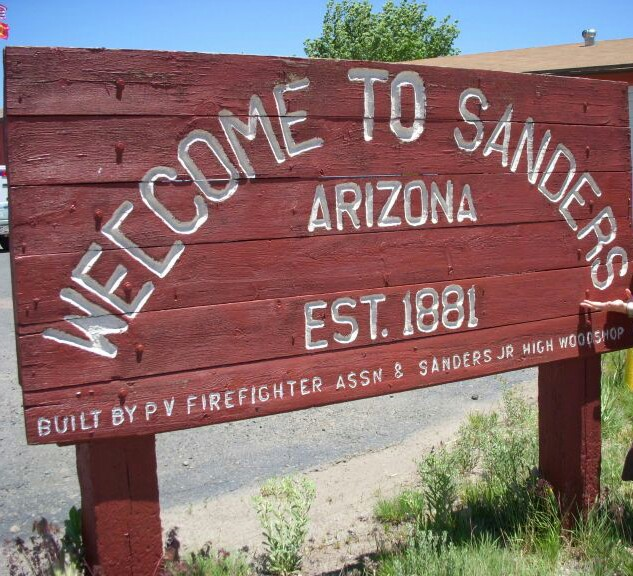
Welcome sign in Sanders AZ

As of the census of 2010, there were 630 people, 200 households, and 151 families residing in the CDP. The population density was 262.5 inhabitants per square mile (101.4/km^{2}). There were 242 housing units at an average density of 100.8 per square mile (38.9/km^{2}). The racial makeup of the CDP was 71.4% Native American, 22.7% White, 0.2% Black or African American, 0.5% Asian, 0.2% Native Hawaiian or other Pacific Islander, 0.8% some other race, and 4.3% from two or more races. 3.8% of the population were Hispanic or Latino of any race.

There were 200 households, of which 48.5% had children under the age of 18, 44.5% were headed by married couples living together, 25.0% had a female householder with no husband present, and 24.5% were non-families. Individuals made up 21.0% of all households, and 4.5% were 65 years of age or older, living alone. The average household size was 3.15, and the average family size was 3.71.

In the CDP, the age distribution of the population was 37.1% under the age of 18, 9.7% from 18 to 24, 24.0% from 25 to 44, 21.3 from 45 to 64, and 7.8% who were 65 years of age or older. The median age was 26.8 years. For every 100 females, there were 84.8 males. For every 100 females age 18 and over, there were 80.0 males.

For the period 2007–11, the estimated median annual income for a household in the CDP was $23,816, and the median income for a family was $24,375. The per capita income for the CDP was $6,741. About 36.6% of families and 33.1% of the population were below the poverty line.

== Education ==
Education in the community is organized by Sanders Unified School District. Sanders Elementary School provides education from kindergarten to grade 5 with Sanders Middle School operating from grades 6 to 8. Valley High School provides high school education. The elementary and middle school are on federal land, while the high school is on reservation land.

== Infrastructure ==
=== Health ===
Sanders is served by the Nahata Dziil Health Clinic which opened in 2015. It is part of the Tséhootsooí Medical Center, located in Fort Defiance, Arizona. Sanders Clinic, which is part of the St. Michael's Clinic, also serves the area.

=== Transportation ===
Sanders is located directly off of Interstate 40 which runs east to west, and U.S. Route 191 which runs from south to north of the town.

=== Public transportation ===
Public transportation is provided by the Navajo Transit System which runs a local weekday bus route from the Nahata Dziil Chapter House to Window Rock.

== See also ==
- List of census-designated places in Arizona
