= Farmington, New Mexico =

Farmington Tóta' (Navajo)
- City
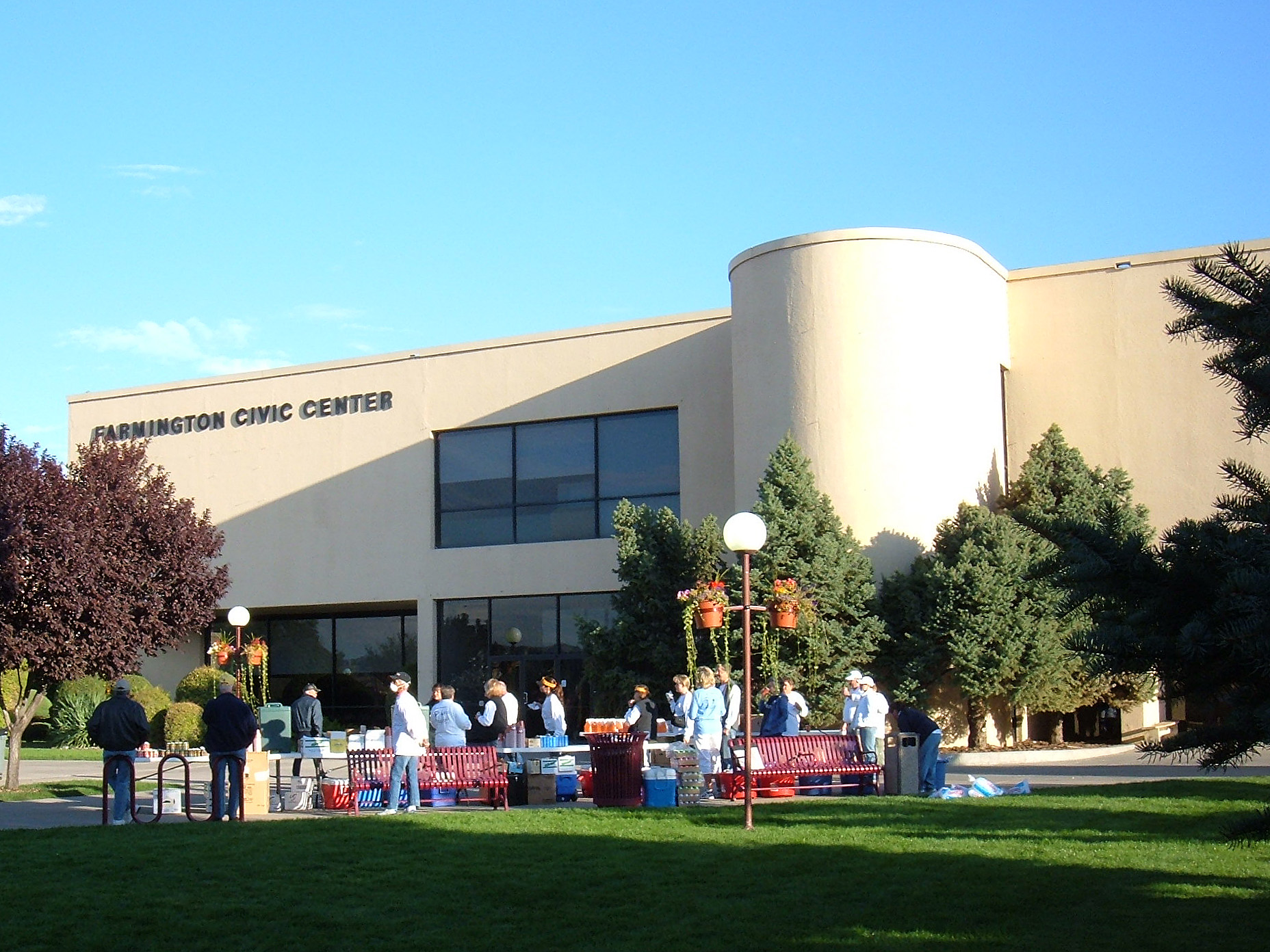
- Farmington Civic Center

- Seal
- Nickname: Baseball Town, U.S.A.
- Location of Farmington in New Mexico

- Location within New Mexico Location within the United States
- Coordinates: 36°45′20″N 108°10′56″W
- Country: United States
- State: New Mexico
- County: San Juan
- Founded: 1901

Government
  - Mayor: Nathan Duckett

Area
  - Total: 34.95 sq mi (90.51 km^{2})
  - Land: 34.46 sq mi (89.25 km^{2})
  - Water: 0.49 sq mi (1.26 km^{2})
- Elevation: 5,473 ft (1,668 m)

Population (2020)
  - Total: 46,624
  - Density: 1,353.0/sq mi (522.38/km^{2})
- Time zone: UTC-07:00 (MST)
  - Summer (DST): UTC-06:00 (MDT)
- ZIP codes: 87401, 87402, 87499
- Area code: 505
- FIPS code: 35-25800
- GNIS feature ID: 2410487
- Website: farmingtonnm.gov

Farmington is a city in San Juan County, New Mexico, United States. As of the 2020 census, the city had a population of 46,624 people. Farmington (and surrounding San Juan County) makes up one of the four metropolitan statistical areas (MSAs) in New Mexico.

Farmington is located at the junction of the San Juan River, the Animas River, and the La Plata River, and is located on the Colorado Plateau. Farmington is the largest city of San Juan County, one of the geographically largest counties in the United States covering 5,538 square miles (14,340 km^{2}). Farmington serves as the commercial hub for most of northwestern New Mexico and the Four Corners region of four states. Farmington lies at or near the junction of several highways: U.S. Route 64, New Mexico State Road 170, New Mexico State Road 371, and New Mexico State Road 516.

It is on the Trails of the Ancients Byway, one of the designated New Mexico Scenic Byways.

The primary non-government industries of Farmington are the production of petroleum, natural gas, and coal and its function as a major retail hub. Outside of Farmington, the Navajo Mine (coal), operated by the Navajo Transitional Energy Company (NTEC), is used entirely for fuel for the nearby Four Corners Generating Station to produce electric power.

== History ==
The area that is now Farmington was settled by Ancestral Pueblo people in the 7th Century. Ruins can be visited at nearby Salmon Ruins and at the Aztec Ruins. When the Ancestral Puebloans left the area, the Navajos, Jicarilla Apaches, and Utes moved into the area. A key part of the region was known in Navajo as Tóta' which means "where three rivers meet".

Although Spanish and American mineral prospecting happened in the area, there were few permanent settlements. In 1868, the Navajo Nation was created, taking up the western half of San Juan County. Six years later, the U.S. government offered territory in the rest of San Juan County to the Jicarilla Apache but they refused. As a result, the area was opened for settlement and a number of settlers moved into the region from Southern Colorado. The area was originally known as "Junction City" because of the access to the three rivers.

In 1901 the town was incorporated and named Farmington with a population of 548. By September 19, 1905, the railroad was finished connecting Farmington to Durango, Colorado, expanding economic and settlement opportunities. It was unusual in that it was a standard-gauge railway that connected to the Denver & Rio Grande Western Railroad narrow-gauge lines of southwestern Colorado. The railroad converted the line to narrow gauge in 1923. The line was abandoned in 1968 and dismantled to Durango in 1969. In addition, in the 1920s there was significant investment in natural gas and oil in the area, although actual production remained low until the 1950s.

On March 18, 1950, Farmington was the site of a mass UFO sighting in which over half the town's population was reported to have seen large saucers in the sky flying at rapid speeds. The population was expanding rapidly after the 1940s construction of a developed road connecting Farmington to U.S. Route 66 and Albuquerque and the San Juan Basin Natural Gas Pipeline in 1953, led by Tom Bolack. However, the significant connection to the energy industry made the economics of the town largely vulnerable to international market fluctuations during the 1970s energy crisis and resulted in some economic diversification.

In 1967, as part of a joint U.S. Government-El Paso Electric operation, an underground nuclear detonation occurred 50 miles (80 km) east of Farmington and about 25 miles (40 km) south of Dulce, New Mexico in present-day Carson National Forest. This pilot project of Operation Plowshare, code-named Project Gasbuggy, was an attempt to fracture a large volume of underground bedrock to make more natural gas available for extraction by gas wells.

The people of Farmington have been the subject of several civil rights investigations, including the 2005 report, The Farmington Report: Civil Rights for Native Americans 30 Years Later.

== Geography ==
According to the U.S. Census Bureau, Farmington has a total area of 32.0 square miles (83 km^{2}), of which 31.5 square miles (82 km^{2}) is land and 0.5 square miles (1.3 km^{2}) is water.

=== Climate ===
Farmington has a semi-arid climate. Despite its altitude of 5,473 feet (1,668 m), the city can experience hot summers and cold winters with low precipitation throughout the year. The average annual snowfall is 12.3 inches (31 cm).

Climate data for Farmington, New Mexico, 1991–2020 normals, extremes 1914–present
Month	Jan	Feb	Mar	Apr	May	Jun	Jul	Aug	Sep	Oct	Nov	Dec	Year
Record high °F (°C)	68 (20)	77 (25)	91 (33)	87 (31)	97 (36)	104 (40)	105 (41)	105 (41)	98 (37)	92 (33)	79 (26)	68 (20)	105 (41)
Mean maximum °F (°C)	54.7 (12.6)	61.6 (16.4)	72.8 (22.7)	80.3 (26.8)	88.2 (31.2)	95.9 (35.5)	97.8 (36.6)	94.9 (34.9)	90.4 (32.4)	82.1 (27.8)	68.7 (20.4)	56.6 (13.7)	98.4 (36.9)
Mean daily maximum °F (°C)	41.1 (5.1)	48.0 (8.9)	57.7 (14.3)	65.4 (18.6)	75.0 (23.9)	86.4 (30.2)	90.2 (32.3)	87.2 (30.7)	80.0 (26.7)	67.5 (19.7)	53.3 (11.8)	41.7 (5.4)	66.1 (19.0)
Daily mean °F (°C)	30.6 (−0.8)	36.3 (2.4)	44.1 (6.7)	50.9 (10.5)	60.2 (15.7)	70.5 (21.4)	75.8 (24.3)	73.5 (23.1)	66.0 (18.9)	53.8 (12.1)	41.1 (5.1)	31.2 (−0.4)	52.8 (11.6)
Mean daily minimum °F (°C)	20.0 (−6.7)	24.5 (−4.2)	30.6 (−0.8)	36.5 (2.5)	45.4 (7.4)	54.6 (12.6)	61.3 (16.3)	59.8 (15.4)	52.0 (11.1)	40.1 (4.5)	28.8 (−1.8)	20.8 (−6.2)	39.5 (4.2)
Mean minimum °F (°C)	6.0 (−14.4)	10.5 (−11.9)	16.8 (−8.4)	23.7 (−4.6)	32.2 (0.1)	42.2 (5.7)	52.9 (11.6)	52.1 (11.2)	37.8 (3.2)	24.3 (−4.3)	12.5 (−10.8)	5.4 (−14.8)	2.2 (−16.6)
Record low °F (°C)	−22 (−30)	−14 (−26)	3 (−16)	10 (−12)	16 (−9)	31 (−1)	37 (3)	35 (2)	24 (−4)	5 (−15)	−3 (−19)	−34 (−37)	−34 (−37)
Average precipitation inches (mm)	0.54 (14)	0.52 (13)	0.59 (15)	0.62 (16)	0.60 (15)	0.26 (6.6)	0.77 (20)	0.98 (25)	1.09 (28)	0.84 (21)	0.59 (15)	0.55 (14)	7.95 (202.6)
Average snowfall inches (cm)	2.2 (5.6)	2.0 (5.1)	0.9 (2.3)	0.3 (0.76)	0.0 (0.0)	0.0 (0.0)	0.0 (0.0)	0.0 (0.0)	0.0 (0.0)	0.5 (1.3)	0.7 (1.8)	2.0 (5.1)	8.6 (21.96)
Average precipitation days (≥ 0.01 in)	5.3	5.1	4.7	4.4	4.1	2.5	6.9	7.1	5.8	5.6	4.6	5.4	61.5
Average snowy days (≥ 0.1 in)	2.0	1.9	0.7	0.3	0.0	0.0	0.0	0.0	0.0	0.3	0.7	2.7	8.6
Source 1: NOAA
Source 2: National Weather Service

== Demographics ==
Historical population
Census	Pop.	Note	%±
1910	785		—
1920	728		−7.3%
1930	1,350		85.4%
1940	2,161		60.1%
1950	3,637		68.3%
1960	23,786		554.0%
1970	21,979		−7.6%
1980	31,222		42.1%
1990	33,997		8.9%
2000	37,844		11.3%
2010	45,877		21.2%
2020	46,624		1.6%
U.S. Decennial Census

=== 2020 census ===
As of the 2020 census, Farmington had a population of 46,624. The median age was 35.0 years. 27.1% of residents were under the age of 18 and 14.7% of residents were 65 years of age or older. For every 100 females there were 94.7 males, and for every 100 females age 18 and over there were 92.1 males age 18 and over.

96.8% of residents lived in urban areas, while 3.2% lived in rural areas.

There were 16,703 households in Farmington, of which 36.9% had children under the age of 18 living in them. Of all households, 44.7% were married-couple households, 17.4% were households with a male householder and no spouse or partner present, and 28.2% were households with a female householder and no spouse or partner present. About 24.9% of all households were made up of individuals and 10.1% had someone living alone who was 65 years of age or older.

There were 18,335 housing units, of which 8.9% were vacant. The homeowner vacancy rate was 2.2% and the rental vacancy rate was 10.4%.

Racial composition as of the 2020 census
Race	Number	Percent
White	22,732	48.8%
Black or African American	465	1.0%
American Indian and Alaska Native	14,328	30.7%
Asian	534	1.1%
Native Hawaiian and Other Pacific Islander	28	0.1%
Some other race	3,618	7.8%
Two or more races	4,919	10.6%
Hispanic or Latino (of any race)	10,427	22.4%

=== 2010 census ===
As of the census of 2010, there were 45,895 people and 17,548 housing units in Farmington. The racial makeup of the city was 62.8% White (including 52.4% White non-Hispanic), 1.0% African American, 22.2% Native American, 0.6% Asian, 0.1% Pacific Islander, and 4.2% from two or more races. Hispanic or Latino of any race were 22.4% of the population.

There were 16,466 households, out of which 33.4% had children under the age of 18 living with them, 49% were married couples living together, 13.6% had a female householder with no husband present, and 30.1% were non-families. 21.7% of all households were made up of individuals, and 8% had someone living alone who was 65 years of age or older. The average household size was 2.7 and the average family size was 3.19.

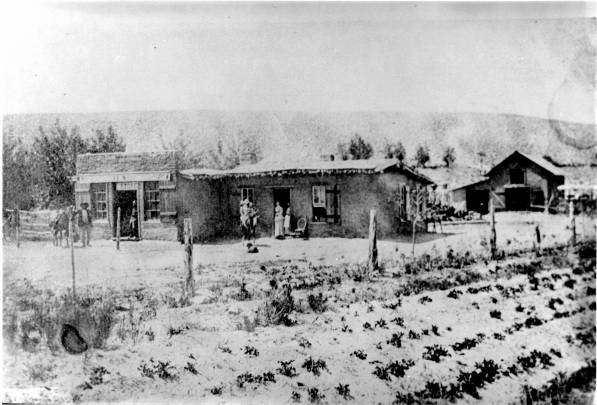
A.F. Miller store and home, c. 1885, the first store in Farmington

== Arts and culture ==
Farmington has been the home of the Connie Mack World Series baseball tournament, played in August every year at Ricketts Park (capacity 5,072), since 1965 (except in 2020, when it was cancelled due to the COVID-19 pandemic). Connie Mack league regular season play includes players age 16 to 18. The Connie Mack World Series consists of 10 or more teams from various regions around the United States, including Puerto Rico.

Farmington holds a riverfest once a year. Area rivers are celebrated with a festival of music, fine arts, food, entertainment, a 10K and 5K run and walk, riverside trail walks, and river raft rides.

Piñon Hills Golf Course, designed by Ken Dye, in Farmington is one of the United States' Top Municipal Golf Courses. Owned and operated by the City of Farmington, Pinon Hills has been ranked in the Top Municipal Golf Courses by Golfweek Magazine for several years.

Fishing, fly and reel, is a very popular activity in Farmington. Fishing is permitted on the San Juan River, Navajo Lake, Lake Farmington, Morgan Lake, the Animas River, Jackson Lake and Cutter Dam.

== Education ==
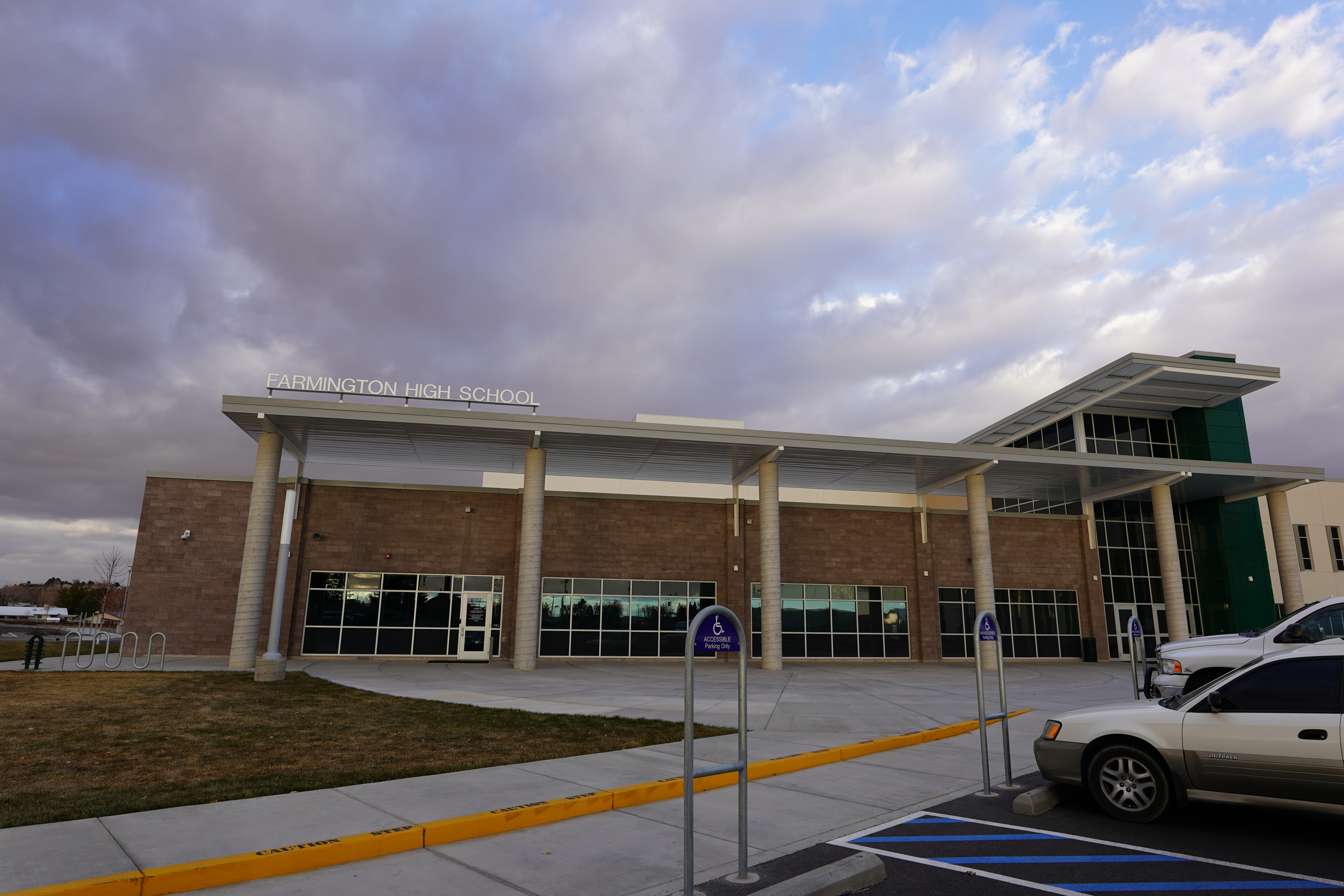
Farmington High School

The Farmington Municipal Schools serves over 10,000 students in grades K-12 in 20 schools. The high schools are Farmington High School, Piedra Vista High School, Rocinante High School, and San Juan College High School. There are four middle schools, Heights, Hermosa, Mesa View and Tibbetts. New Mexico School for the Deaf operates a preschool facility in Farmington. Navajo Preparatory School is a Bureau of Indian Education-affiliated tribal school.

There are six private schools, if Navajo Preparatory is counted as one. The National Center for Education Statistics counts Navajo Prep as public. Sacred Heart School, Farmington (K-8), of the Roman Catholic Diocese of Gallup, was established in 1910.

San Juan College is a public two-year college with - as of Fall 2021 - a per-semester headcount of almost 6,000 persons, and a full time equivalent (FTE) enrollment of just over 3,000.

Farmington Public Library moved into a new building in 2003 and holds about 200,000 items in its collection. There was a branch library in Shiprock that is currently closed.

== Infrastructure ==
=== Transportation ===
==== Air ====
- Farmington is served by Four Corners Regional Airport.

==== Highways ====
- U.S. Highway 64 is the major east–west highway through San Juan County and across Farmington.
- New Mexico State Road 170 extends northward from U.S. Highway 64 to the Colorado state line.
- New Mexico State Road 371 connects southward from U.S. Highway 64 to Interstate 40. It passes almost exclusively through the Navajo Indian reservation, and passes through only a few small towns or villages (such as Crownpoint and Thoreau). It is also the primary means of accessing the Bisti/De-Na-Zin Wilderness area.
- New Mexico State Road 516 is a southwest–northeast connector between Farmington and U.S. Highway 550 in Aztec.
  - U.S. Highway 550 does not run through Farmington (nearby in Bloomfield and Aztec), but is a commonly referenced arterial by Farmington as a means to connect with central New Mexico, Interstate 25, Albuquerque, and (via I-25) the capital city of Santa Fe.

==== Intercity bus ====
- There is intercity bus service in Farmington, The Red Apple Transit.
- North Central Regional Transit District provides bus service from Chama, NM and Dulce, NM.
- The Navajo Transit System provides regional bus service to the Navajo Nation. Farmington is served by Route 07a from Newcomb, NM to Fort Defiance, AZ and Route 07b from Newcomb, NM to Shiprock, NM.

=== Utilities ===
==== Electricity ====
- The Farmington Electric Utility System (FEUS) is owned and operated by the City of Farmington, serving approximately 46,000 metered customers. Its service territory covers 1,718 square miles and encompasses the city, much of San Juan County, and a small portion of Rio Arriba County.
- As of June 2021, the City generates approximately 36% of its consumed power from its own gas-fired generation facilities, 17% from the Navajo Dam hydroelectric facility, and the remainder purchased from third party generation resources.
- Aside from Navajo Lake (where generation facilities were established in 1988), a nominal amount of expansion of its owned generation facilities has been using renewable resources. Renewable energy is predominantly sourced from external third parties or via purchasing agreements with net metered facilities in its service area.

==== Water and wastewater ====
- The city's water comes from Farmington Lake, which is sourced from and fed using pumps located on the Animas River. Water and wastewater treatment facilities, operations, and management are all contracted by the city to Jacobs Engineering Solutions.

==== Solid waste ====
- The City contracts all solid waste operations to Waste Management (of New Mexico) Inc., including general solid waste, recycling facilities and operations, and hazardous waste disposal. Disposal of City waste is done at the San Juan County Landfill, owned by the county and also operated by Waste Management of New Mexico.

==== Telecommunications ====
- Cable service (television and Internet) is provided by Xfinity.
- Landline service (telephone and Internet) is provided by CenturyLink (Lumens Technologies).
- Mobile service (telephone and Internet) is provided by all major carriers. As of October 2023, 5G cellular service is made available via T-mobile and other major cellular providers.

== Politics ==
As of August 2022, Farmington had approximately 28,548 active registered voters. There were 24.4% unaffiliated with a party, 51.0% Republican, 22.2% Democratic, 1.2% Libertarian, and 1.2% various other parties. Like the rest of San Juan County, it is a politically conservative community surrounded by generally more liberal counties, and situated within an overall more liberal/left-leaning state.

Voting has historically strongly favored conservative ideals and candidates, although state and local government bonds and other tax-imposing initiatives are almost always approved by the electorate.

== Notable people ==
- Tom Bolack (1918–1998) — Governor and Lieutenant Governor of New Mexico; Mayor of Farmington; oilman; rancher
- Mike Dunn (born 1985) — athlete, Major League Baseball pitcher for the Colorado Rockies and the Miami Marlins
- Robert Fry (murderer) (born 1973), serial killer who killed three men and one woman
- Larry Echo Hawk (born 1948) — former Attorney General of Idaho, 10th Assistant Secretary of the Interior for Indian Affairs, and general authority emeritus of the Church of Jesus Christ of Latter-day Saints
- Harris Hartz (born 1947) — U.S. federal judge on the U.S. Court of Appeals for the Tenth Circuit
- Charly Martin (born 1984) — NFL player
- Ralph Neely (born 1943) — NFL offensive lineman for Dallas Cowboys
- Alana Nichols (born 1983) — Paralympic gold medalist in alpine skiing and wheelchair basketball
- Onry Ozzborn (born 1979) — rapper and founding member of Grayskul
- Chevel Shepherd (born 2002) — singer and winner of the 15th season of The Voice
- Chase Silseth (born 2000) — MLB pitcher for the Texas Rangers
- Sleep (born 1976) — rapper and member of The Chicharones
- Melanie Stansbury (born 1979) — U.S. Representative, former state representative and scientist
- Duane Ward (1964-2026) — athlete, MLB pitcher for Toronto Blue Jays and Atlanta Braves
- Dale Whittington (1959–2003) — racing driver
- Kenneth L. Worley (1948–1968) — U.S. Marine who received the Medal of Honor

== See also ==
- 2023 Farmington, New Mexico shooting
