= Wide Ruins, Arizona =

- Census-designated place
- Location within Arizona
- Coordinates: 35°25′02″N 109°29′59″W
- Country: United States
- State: Arizona
- County: Apache

Area
  - Total: 0.39 sq mi (1.01 km^{2})
  - Land: 0.39 sq mi (1.01 km^{2})
  - Water: 0 sq mi (0.00 km^{2})
- Elevation: 6,273 ft (1,912 m)

Population (2020)
  - Total: 20
  - Density: 51.1/sq mi (19.73/km^{2})
- Time zone: UTC-7 (MST)
- ZIP code: 86505
- Area code: 928
- FIPS code: 04-82810
- GNIS feature ID: 2582905

Wide Ruins is a chapter of the Navajo Nation and a census-designated place (CDP) in Apache County, Arizona, United States. The population was 176 at the 2010 census.

== Geography ==
According to the United States Census Bureau, the CDP has a total area of 0.39 square miles (1.0 km^{2}), all land.

== History ==
A large pueblo ruin, now long abandoned, is believed to have been established here about 1264-1285 (based on archaeological evidence), later called Kin tiel (Navajo, "Broad House").

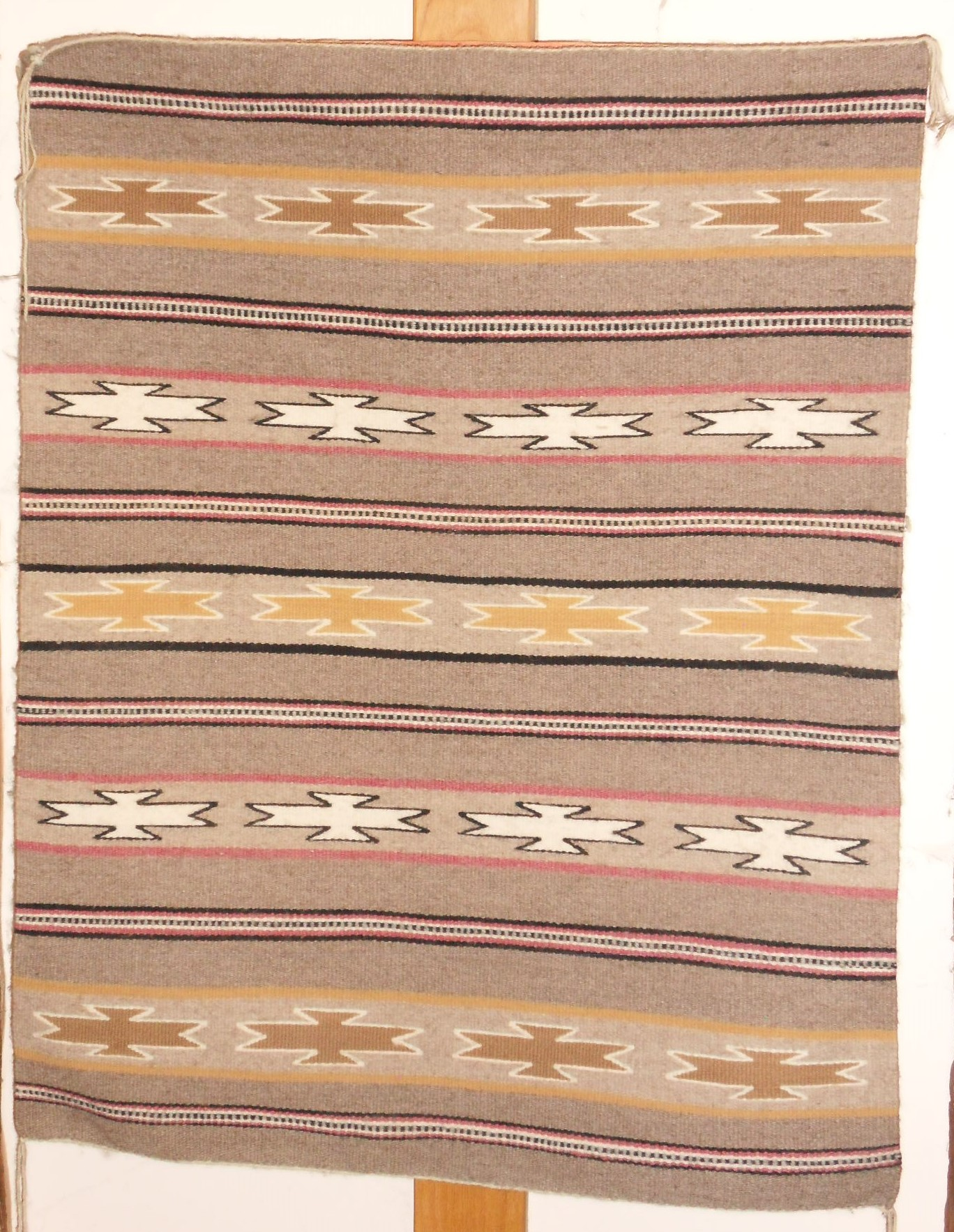
Wide Ruins tapestry 1973, all natural wool and vegetal dyes

In the 20th century, a trading post was established within some of the ruin's remaining walls, which in 1938 was acquired by Bill and Sallie Wagner Lippincott, who operated it until 1949. Sallie, like many traders, significantly influenced the weavers whose rugs she purchased, persuading them to use only vegetal dyes, and refusing to accept inferior workmanship.

== Mythology ==
(The following appears to be entirely based on the referenced oral history)

=== Jilhaal and Kin Naazinii (Upstanding House) ===
Jilłháál, or Jilhaal, whose name is not easily translated but refers to a war club, was an early 18th-century singer, warrior, and runner. As suggested in oral history and archaeology, he arrived at the Ganado–Wide Ruins area and traveled extensively. He lived among the Rio Grande Pueblo peoples and migrated with many of them to the refuge of Dinetah at the start of the Spanish invasion and occupation of present-day Arizona and New Mexico.

Jilhaal is believed to have brought many cultural, architectural, and agricultural influences to the greater Ganado-Wide Ruins region. Research suggests that Jilhaal contributed to the construction of fortifications to the north and south, notably in the hills east of Wide Ruins, 15 miles to the southeast of Ganado. Archaeologist David M. Brugge offers that Jilhaal "might have been a local headman of the mid-1770s, possibly a refugee from Awatobi, considering his clan (Táchiiʼnii) and his move to Black Mountain, a refuge of Tobacco Táchiiʼnii people from Awatobi." Oral history research suggests that he inhabited "Wide Ruins, (meaning the Ancestral Pueblo site) and, a few miles north up Wide Ruins Wash," at the citadel of Kin Naazinii (Upstanding House); if not contributed to its construction – with the help of elder Daalgai – "a Navajo fortified 'pueblito' that archaeologists date at 1720–1805 (NLC, site S-MLC-UP-L; Bannister and others 1966:8; Navajo Nation 1967:263, 271, 285; Gilpin 1996)." Thus, Jilhaal is believed to have traveled between here "north to Canyon de Chelly" regularly.

Oral histories tells of a Jilhaal who carried "gigantic arrows, and had enormous feet. The sight of his footprints struck terror in his enemies. Some say he was a hunter who could run down deer; others say he knew various healing and war ceremonies. Some say he was of the Red Streak into Water (Táchiiʼnii) clan and later moved to Black Mountain." His fame is embedded in oral history known to many Navajo families. "Some of his attributes may reflect late pre-Columbian iconography (big feet, for example, a common petroglyph motif). These pre-Columbian associations of Jilhaal, together with the idea that Wide Ruins was some kind of 'boundary' place between Hopi and Zuni zones ..., makes one wonder if the north-south travel corridor through Wide Ruins to Canyon de Chelly could have been a late 'everyone's land' as conceptualized by LaBlanc (1999:70, 333) between settlement clusters" much older.

=== Kin Naazinii Fortress ===
According to oral history, "Kin Naazinii was built as a fortress, with [defensive] slits in the walls for shooting arrows at enemies. People lived around the site and on top of the hill." The fortress was used as a citadel and "refuge when enemies were detected in the area. Some elders lived south of the site, including one named Daalgai, who helped build the fortifications" with Jilhaal. "Four stones deep were used (apparently meaning wall thickness). ... A passage underneath existed, "where one would crawl in and upward. This was the means of entry." It has since collapsed. "The defensive strategy was employed against "Utes and White Mountain Apaches. There was a goat corral in the rocks (or rincon?) below the fortress. The architecture provided good shield; modern in technology, it provided that those inside would not be a casualty by arrow shot. Hogans (homes) were constructed around the citadel for peace time use. Kin Naazinii Spring, located further up the canyon, was used as a water resource for the citadel. Oral legend suggests that a coyote had dug it out. At one point in the citadel's history, an ancient massacre occurred at Kin Naazinii. It is said that bones fragments were scattered around about the location, as well as leather, bridles, and other items.

Scholars postulate that Kin Naazinii was positioned off circuitous routes from Zuni Pueblo to Hopi Mesa Pueblos, so that local Navajos could watch such travel without being seen. Surrounding hilltops provided views of the terrain that the ancient trails crossed.

== Demographics ==
Historical population
Census	Pop.	Note	%±
2010	176		—
2020	20		−88.6%
U.S. Decennial Census

== Education ==
The Bureau of Indian Education (BIE)-affiliated tribal K-6 school Wide Ruin Community School is in the community.

Sanders Unified School District is the local school district.
