= Sanders Unified School District =

School district in Arizona, United States

Address
- Highway 191 South and Interstate 40 Sanders, Arizona, 86512; United States

District information
- Type: Public
- Grades: PreK–12
- NCES District ID: 0406740

Students and staff
- Students: 653
- Teachers: 48.8
- Staff: 80.0
- Student–teacher ratio: 13.38

Other information
- Website: www.sandersusd.net

Sanders Unified School District is a school district in the community of Sanders in Apache County in the US state of Arizona.

The district operates three schools, Sanders Elementary School (K-5), Sanders Middle School (grades 6–8) and Valley High School.

In addition to Sanders, Houck, Lupton, and Wide Ruins are in the district.
