= Farmington Public Library =

Public library system in New Mexico, US

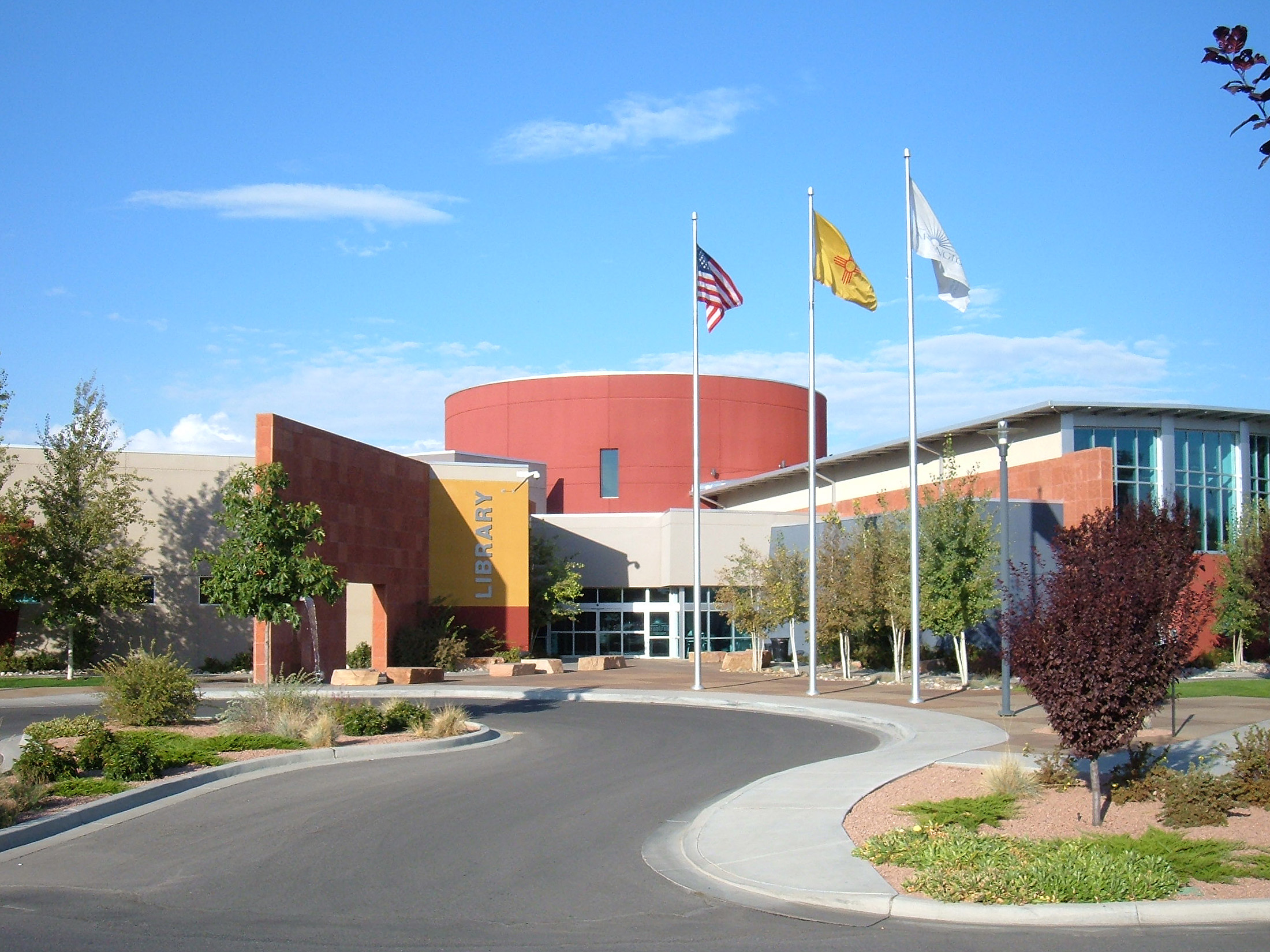
- 36°45′0.09″N 108°10′44.34″W
- Location: 2101 Farmington Ave., Farmington, NM 87401
- Established: 1921
- Branches: 1

Collection
- Size: 203,167

Access and use
- Circulation: 521,500
- Population served: 112,008

Other information
- Director: Karen McPheeters
- Website: http://www.infoway.org/

Farmington Public Library is a public library system in San Juan County, New Mexico.

== History ==
The library was founded in 1921 in the living room of Mrs. Lorena Mahany's home at 506 West Arrington in downtown Farmington, New Mexico. Mrs. Mahany offered her services as the first librarian. In 1938 the library was moved to a new building constructed as a Works Progress Administration project located on the small city park at the corner of East La Plata and Orchard. The collection consisted of 2,000 books. This building was remodelled in 1961 and again in 1974. In 1984 the library was moved into the former First National Bank building located at 100 West Broadway in downtown Farmington.

Groundbreaking for the new Farmington Public Library building occurred in March 2002 in a vacant lot located on East Twentieth Street between Farmington Avenue and Schofield Lane. The architects were Bill Hidell and Associates of Carrollton, Texas. The project was paid for by the City of Farmington, partly through its reserve fund and partly through the sale of municipal bonds. The cost of the library building was $9,767,773. The grand opening of the new building took place on the evening of August 23, 2003.

== Notable features ==
The building won New Mexico's Best New Buildings awards for Interior and for Best Lighting - Interior in 2004, awarded by Associated General Contractors New Mexico Building Branch and the New Mexico Business Journal.

The building is decorated with images of local petroglyphs sandblasted onto glass panels. The words "Summer Solstice" and "Winter Solstice" are engraved at precise locations on the rotunda floor and are highlighted by the sunlight passing through a small window exactly on those dates.

== Growth ==
From 2001 to 2005, circulation has increased 92% and the number of visits has increased 57%. The new library building, completed in 2003, was already at capacity in collection space, public computer utilization and meeting room access by 2007. The City of Farmington commissioned a master plan study from Hidell Associates in 2006 and is considering its options.
