= Navajo Transit System =

Public transportation system

- Parent: Navajo Nation
- Commenced operation: October 1980
- Headquarters: Fort Defiance, AZ
- Routes: 17
- Fleet: 45, including 35 transit buses
- Daily ridership: 247,255 (2013)
- Website: https://navajotransit.navajo-nsn.gov/

The Navajo Transit System (NTS) is a public transportation system that serves and operates on the Navajo Nation. The system currently operates 17 routes throughout the Navajo Nation and within Arizona, New Mexico and Utah. The system provides service to 41 of the 110 Navajo Chapter communities.

The NTS is a department of the Division of Transportation of the Navajo Nation Government. The NTS receives funding from the Arizona Department of Transportation, the New Mexico Department of Transportation, the Utah Department of Transportation, and the Federal Transit Administration.

The NTS has been criticized for frequent service interruptions. In 2017, the NTS had some federal grants suspended due to non-compliance with government protocol.

In 2018, The NTS announced a partnership with the Farmington Red Apple Transit system which allows riders to transfer between the systems free-of-charge in Kirtland, NM and Farmington, NM.

Due to the COVID-19 pandemic, the NTS suspended service on March 18, 2020. Service was not resumed until a June 7, 2021 soft restart of routes 3, 5, 9, and 14.

== Routes ==
The NTS operates the following routes:

- Route 01: Tuba City, AZ to Fort Defiance, AZ
- Route 02: Whitecone, AZ to Steamboat, AZ to Fort Defiance, AZ
- Route 03: Kayenta, AZ to Fort Defiance, AZ
- Route 04: Crownpoint, NM to Fort Defiance, AZ
- Route 05: Gallup, NM to Fort Defiance, AZ
- Route 06: Crystal, NM to Gallup, NM
- Route 07a: Newcomb, NM to Farmington, NM to Fort Defiance, AZ
- Route 07b: Newcomb, NM to Farmington, NM to Shiprock, NM
- Route 08: Chinle, AZ to Ganado, AZ to Tsaile, AZ
- Route 09: Dilkon, AZ to Fort Defiance, AZ
- Route 10: Pinon, AZ to Chinle, AZ to Tsaile, AZ
- Route 11: Birdspring, AZ to Flagstaff, AZ to Tuba City, AZ
- Route 13: Fort Defiance, AZ to Crownpoint, NM and Gallup, NM
- Route 14: Shiprock, NM to Fort Defiance, AZ
- Route 15: Sanders, AZ to Window Rock, AZ
- Route 16: Aneth, UT to Bluff, UT to Blanding, UT
- Route 18: Local service in Shiprock, NM (Shiprock Local Area Transit)
