= Houck, Arizona =

CDP in Apache County, Arizona

Houck, Arizona Maʼiitoʼí (Navajo)
- Census-designated place
- Location in Apache County and the state of Arizona

- Location in the United States
- Coordinates: 35°16′17″N 109°13′25″W
- Country: United States
- State: Arizona
- County: Apache

Government
  - Type: Navajo Chapter Government
  - Houck Chapter President: Lorenzo Curley

Area
  - Total: 42.48 sq mi (110.03 km^{2})
  - Land: 42.46 sq mi (109.97 km^{2})
  - Water: 0.023 sq mi (0.06 km^{2})
- Elevation: 5,968 ft (1,819 m)

Population (2020)
  - Total: 886
  - Density: 20.9/sq mi (8.06/km^{2})
- Time zone: UTC-7 (MST)
- ZIP codes: 86506, 86508
- Area code: 928
- FIPS code: 04-33980
- GNIS feature ID: 2408403

Houck (/haʊk/ HOWK;) is a census-designated place (CDP) in Apache County, Arizona, United States. The population was 1,024 at the 2010 census.

== History ==
Houck was founded by a mail carrier by that name working a route from Prescott to Fort Wingate. In 1877, he established a trading post called Houck's Tank here. Houck left in 1885.

Houck was home to Fort Courage (a replica of the set of the 1960s television series F Troop, which was a tourist attraction along Route 66) and a Greyhound bus stop. It once had a gas station, a Taco Bell, and a pancake house. It is home to the Native American Baha'i Institute.

== Geography ==
Houck is located at 35°17′1″N 109°14′16″W (35.283615, -109.237695).

According to the United States Census Bureau, the CDP has a total area of 42.5 square miles (110.0 km^{2}), of which 0.023 square miles (0.06 km^{2}), or 0.05%, is water.

=== Climate ===
According to the Köppen Climate Classification system, Houck has a semi-arid climate, abbreviated "BSk" on climate maps.

Climate data for Houck (6,035 ft above sea level)
Month	Jan	Feb	Mar	Apr	May	Jun	Jul	Aug	Sep	Oct	Nov	Dec	Year
Record high °F (°C)	72 (22)	74 (23)	80 (27)	86 (30)	96 (36)	102 (39)	107 (42)	101 (38)	100 (38)	90 (32)	79 (26)	71 (22)	107 (42)
Mean daily maximum °F (°C)	48 (9)	53 (12)	60 (16)	68 (20)	78 (26)	88 (31)	91 (33)	88 (31)	82 (28)	70 (21)	58 (14)	48 (9)	69 (21)
Daily mean °F (°C)	34 (1)	38.5 (3.6)	43.5 (6.4)	50 (10)	59 (15)	68 (20)	74 (23)	72.5 (22.5)	65.5 (18.6)	54 (12)	42.5 (5.8)	34 (1)	53.0 (11.6)
Mean daily minimum °F (°C)	20 (−7)	24 (−4)	27 (−3)	32 (0)	40 (4)	48 (9)	57 (14)	57 (14)	49 (9)	38 (3)	27 (−3)	20 (−7)	37 (2)
Record low °F (°C)	−31 (−35)	−22 (−30)	−15 (−26)	5 (−15)	14 (−10)	25 (−4)	35 (2)	32 (0)	20 (−7)	12 (−11)	−18 (−28)	−20 (−29)	−31 (−35)
Average precipitation inches (mm)	0.86 (22)	0.69 (18)	0.84 (21)	0.60 (15)	0.52 (13)	0.23 (5.8)	1.33 (34)	1.67 (42)	1.05 (27)	1.06 (27)	0.94 (24)	0.63 (16)	10.42 (264.8)
Source: Weather Channel

== Demographics ==
Historical population
Census	Pop.	Note	%±
2000	1,087		—
2010	1,024		−5.8%
2020	886		−13.5%
U.S. Decennial Census

As of the census of 2000, there were 1,087 people, 312 households, and 234 families residing in the CDP. The population density was 25.7 inhabitants per square mile (9.9/km^{2}). There were 414 housing units at an average density of 9.8 per square mile (3.8/km^{2}). The racial makeup of the CDP was 95.6% Native American, 2.2% White, 0.1% Black or African American, 0.1% Asian, and 2.0% from two or more races. 1.0% of the population were Hispanic or Latino of any race.

There were 312 households, out of which 47.1% had children under the age of 18 living with them, 37.8% were married couples living together, 28.2% had a female householder with no husband present, and 25.0% were non-families. 22.4% of all households were made up of individuals, and 5.1% had someone living alone who was 65 years of age or older. The average household size was 3.48 and the average family size was 4.19.

In the CDP, the age distribution of the population shows 42.2% under the age of 18, 7.3% from 18 to 24, 24.9% from 25 to 44, 19.1% from 45 to 64, and 6.4% who were 65 years of age or older. The median age was 26 years. For every 100 females, there were 94.1 males. For every 100 females age 18 and over, there were 92.6 males.

The median income for a household in the CDP was $12,353, and the median income for a family was $20,208. Males had a median income of $18,750 versus $22,788 for females. The per capita income for the CDP was $5,219. About 53.8% of families and 53.5% of the population were below the poverty line, including 55.7% of those under age 18 and 51.4% of those age 65 or over.

== Education ==
The area is served by Sanders Unified School District.

The area is served by Sanders Elementary School, Sanders Middle School, and Valley High School.

== Gallery ==
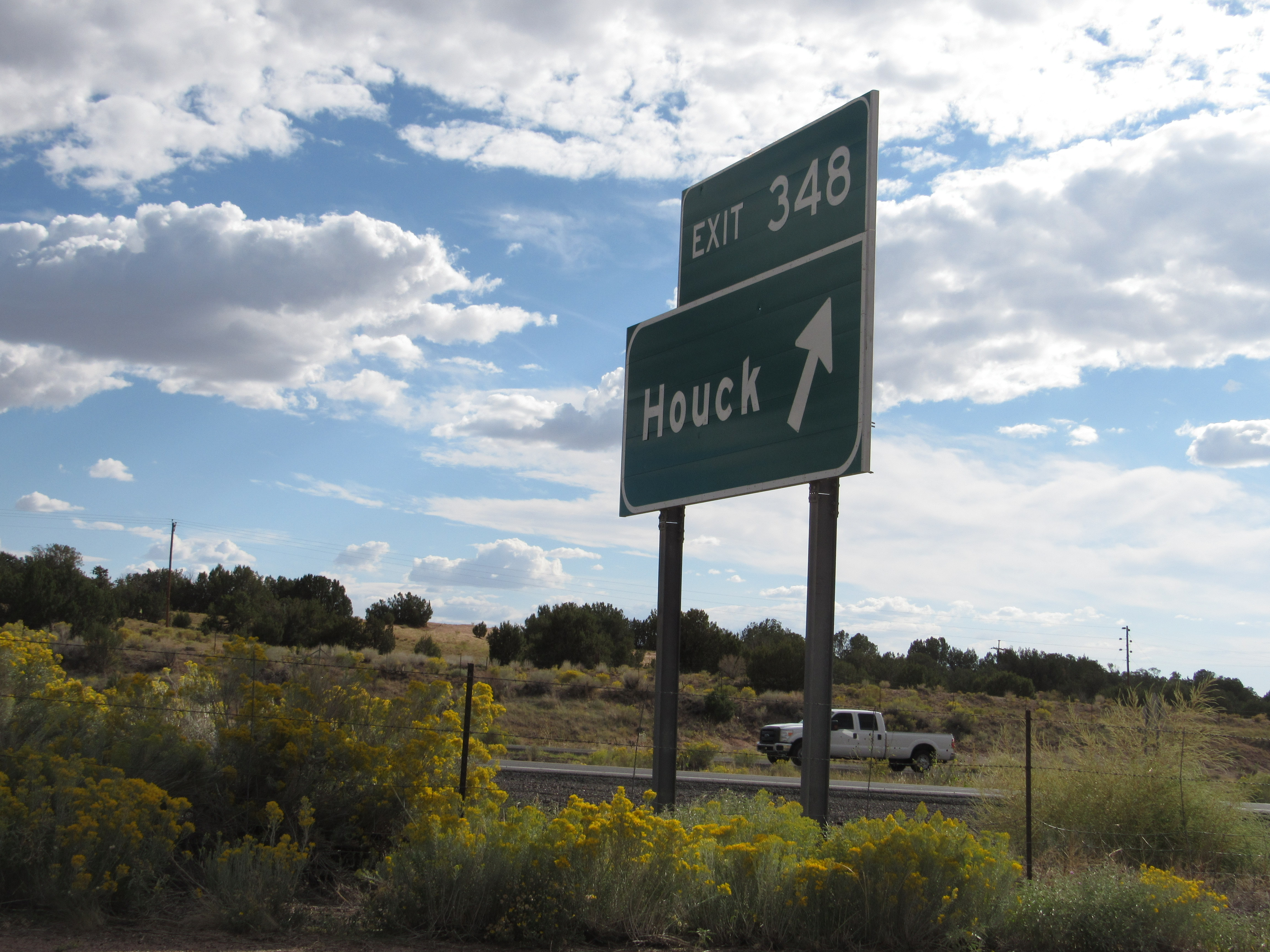
Exit 348 to Houck, Arizona

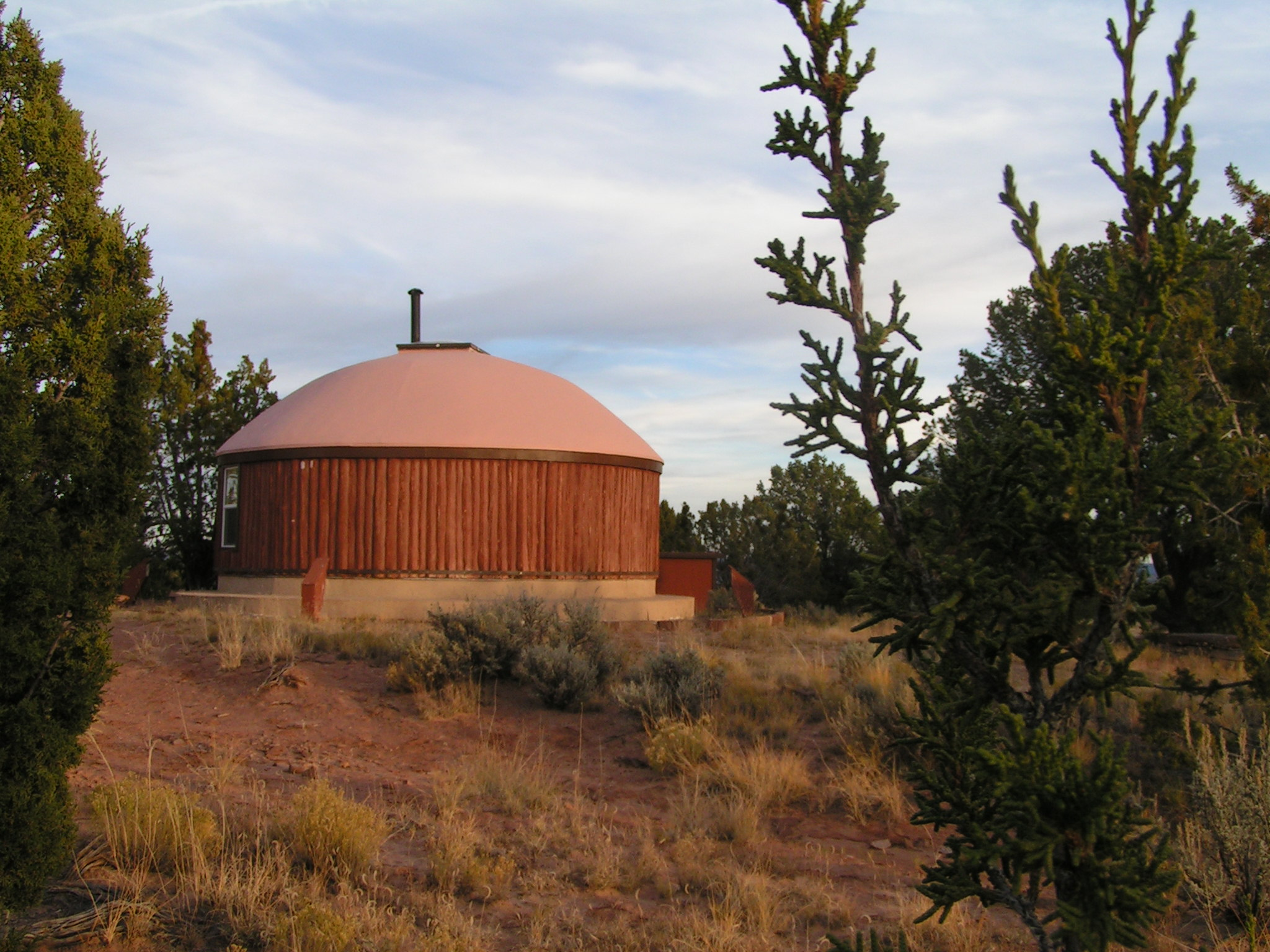
The prayer hogan at the Native American Baha'i Institute on Houck, Arizona, on the Navajo Nation.

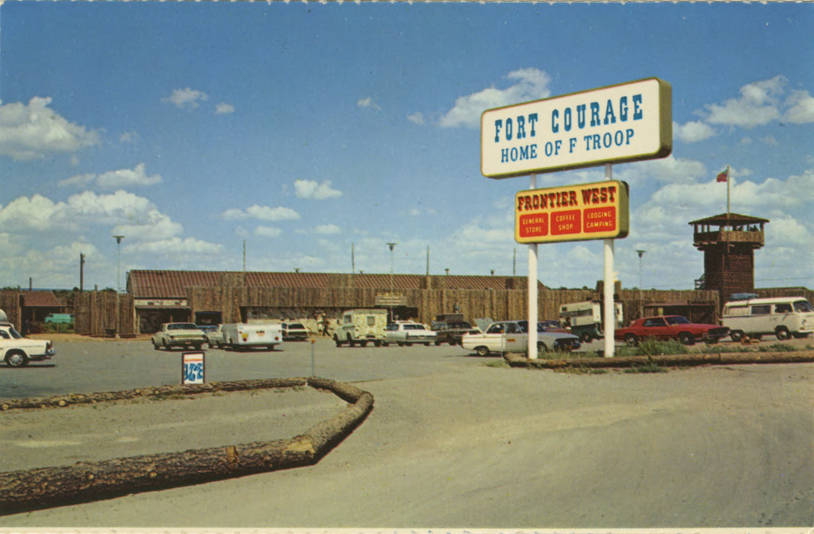
Fort Courage post card, showing the location in the mid-1960s.

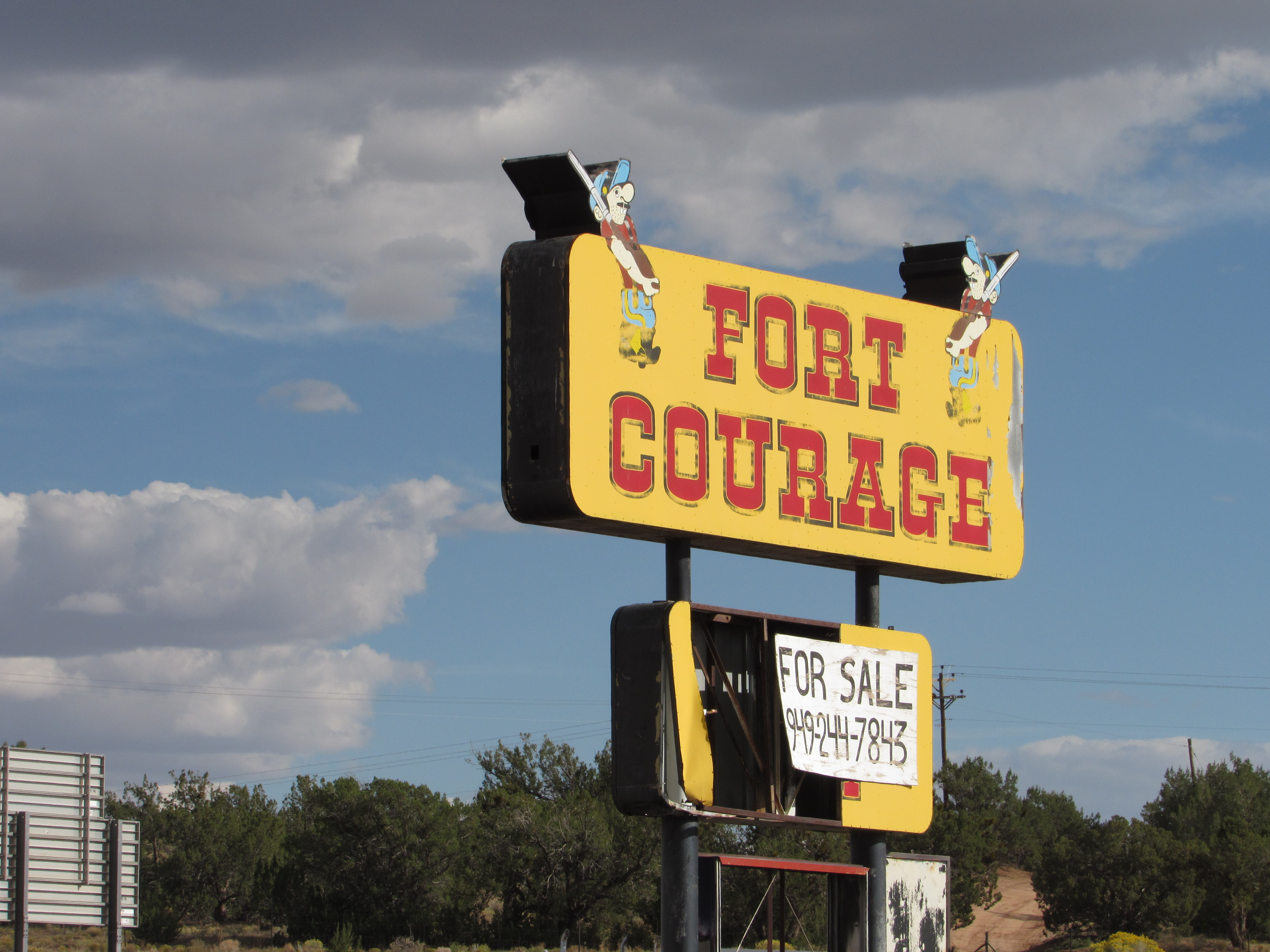
Fort Courage sign in Houck, Arizona

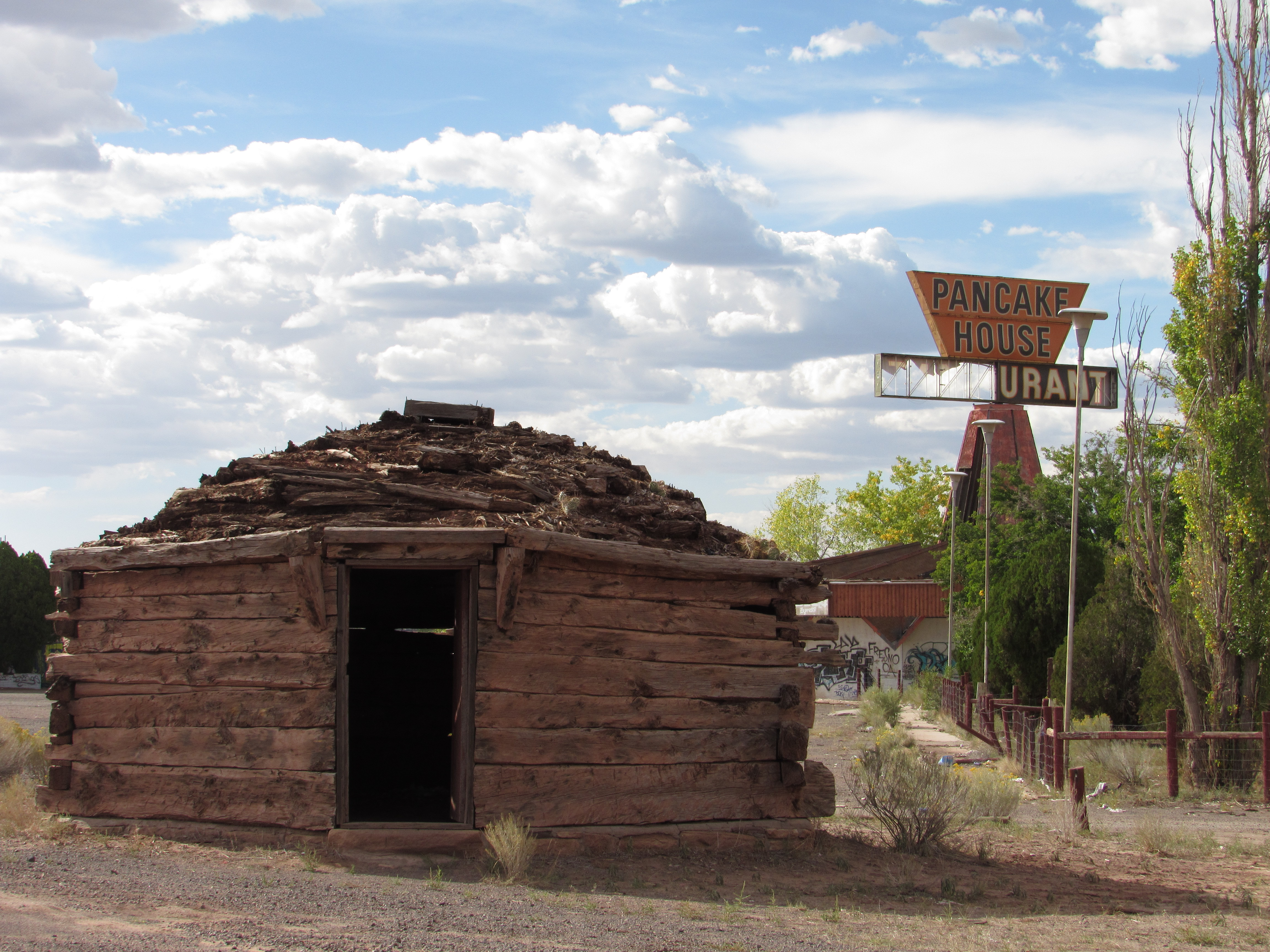
Remnants of Fort Courage in Houck, AZ

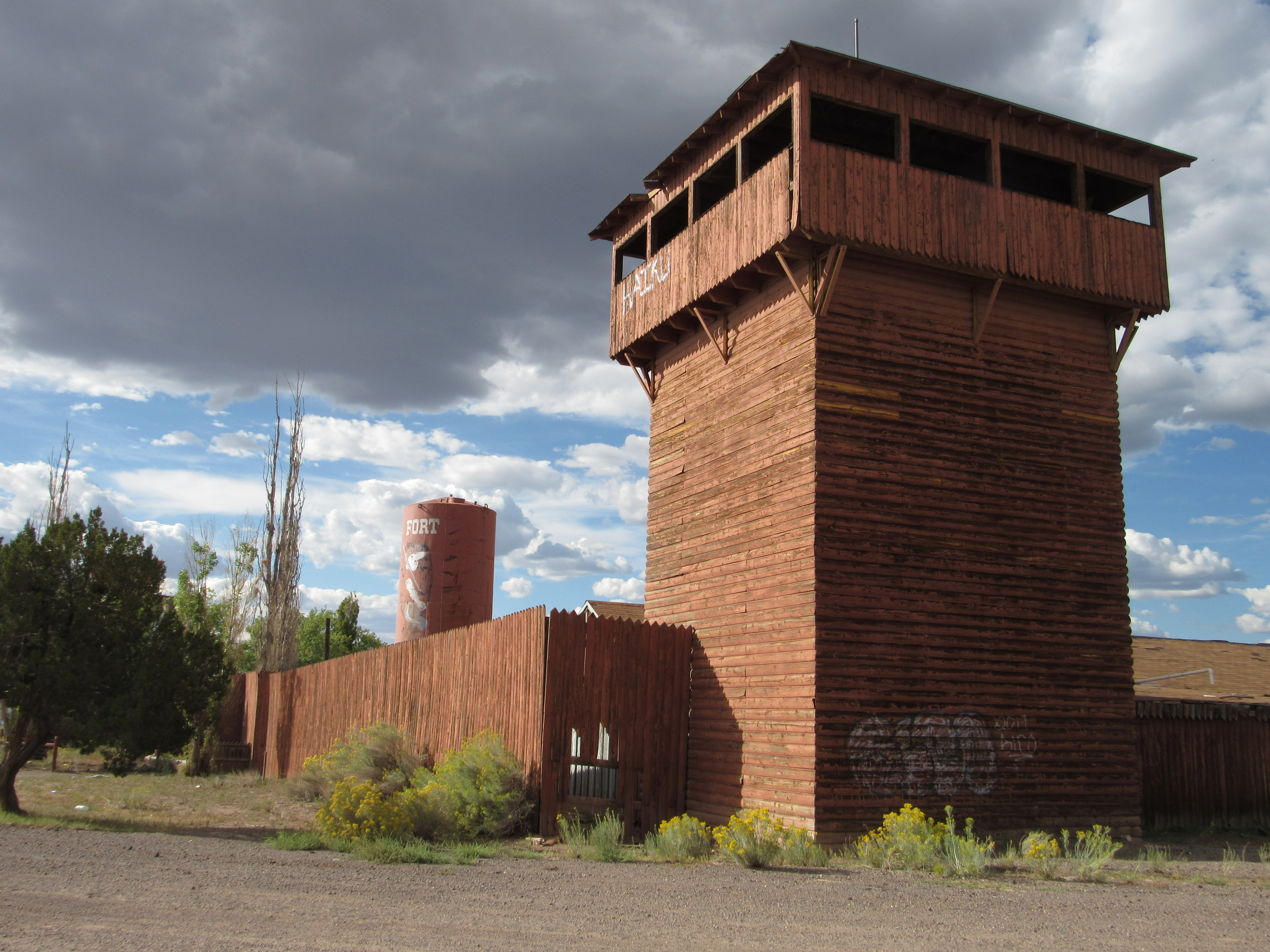
Remnants of Fort Courage in Houck, AZ

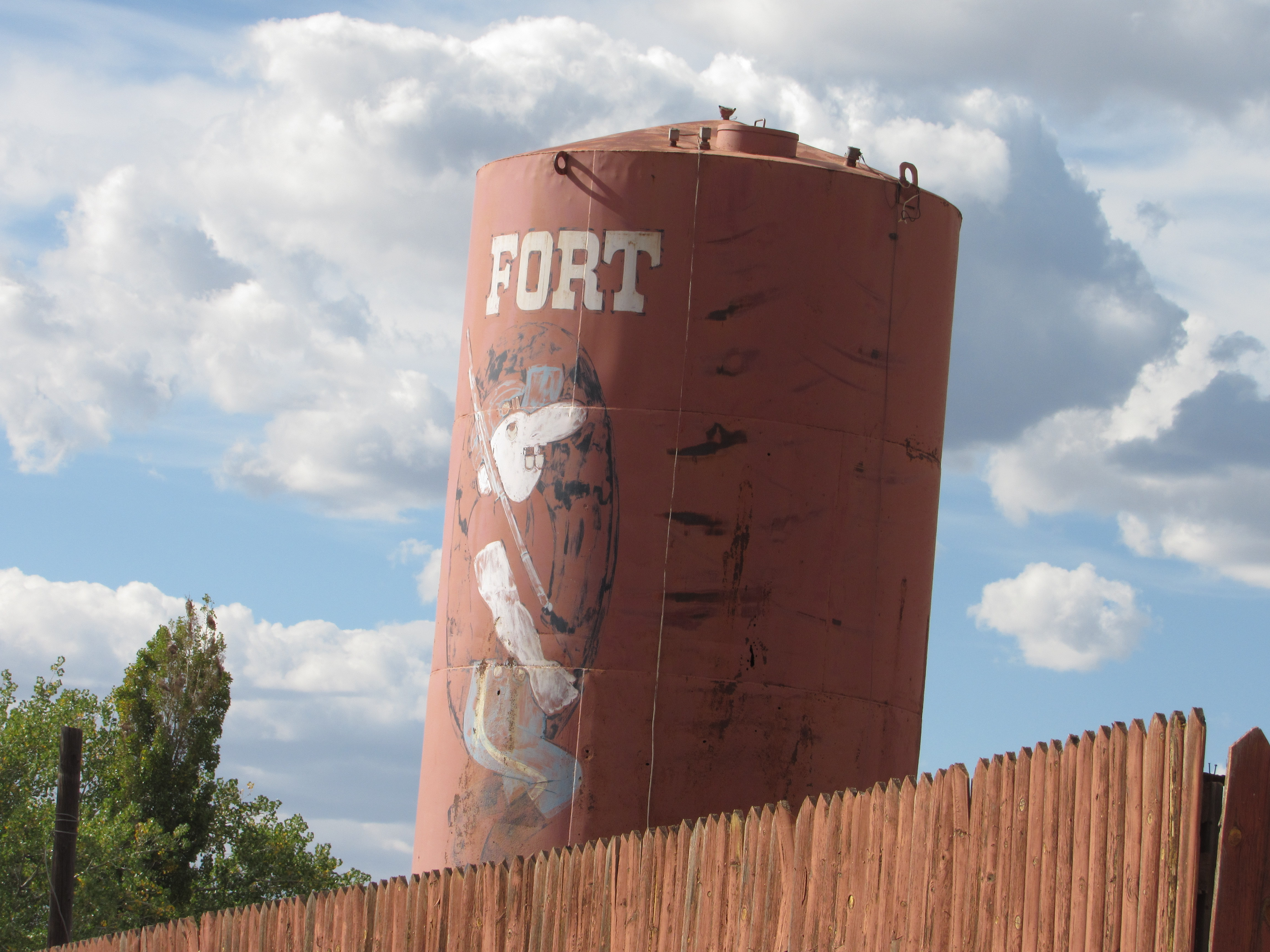
Fort Courage water tower in Houck, AZ

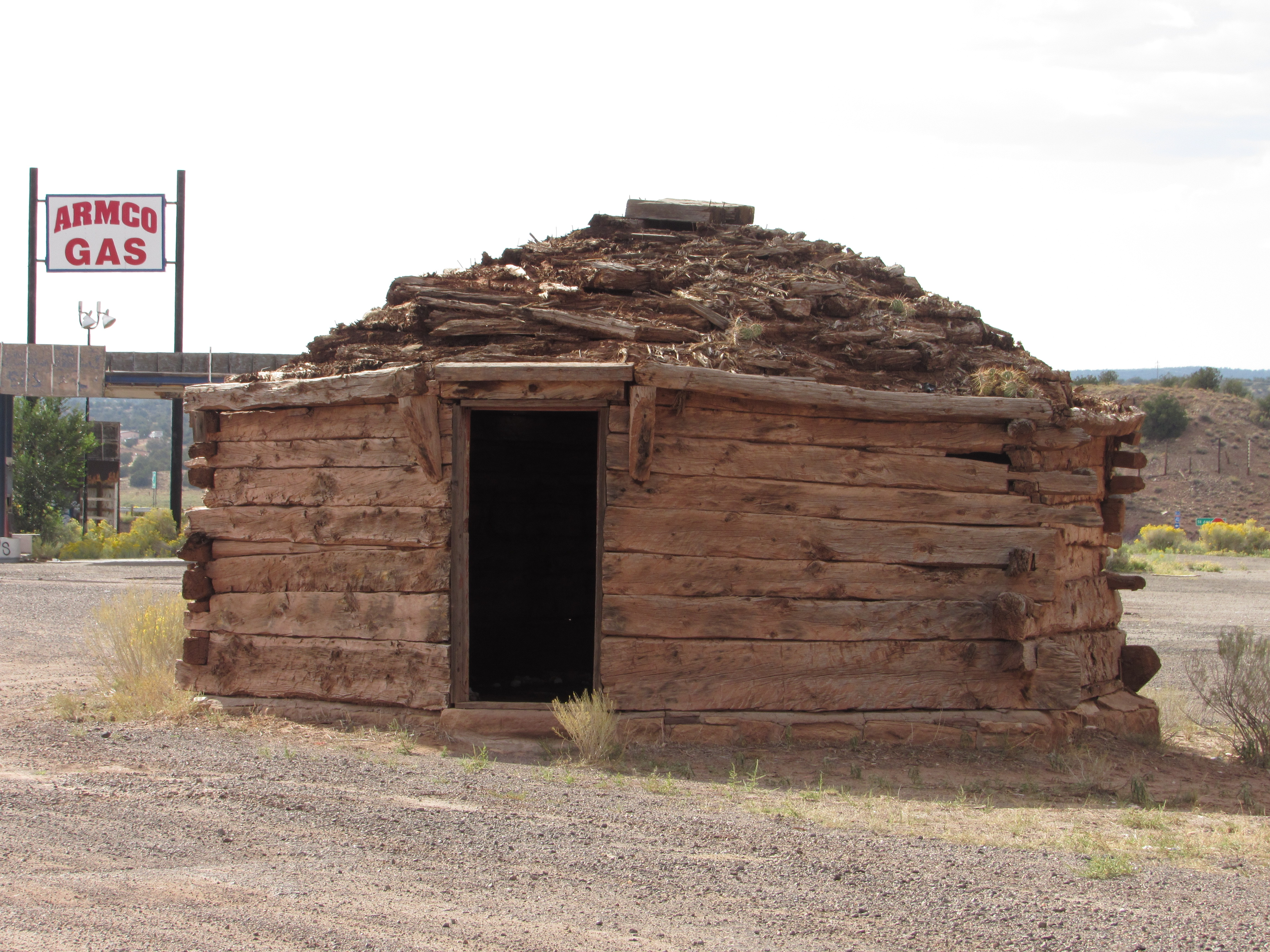
Gas station sign behind a building on Fort Courage

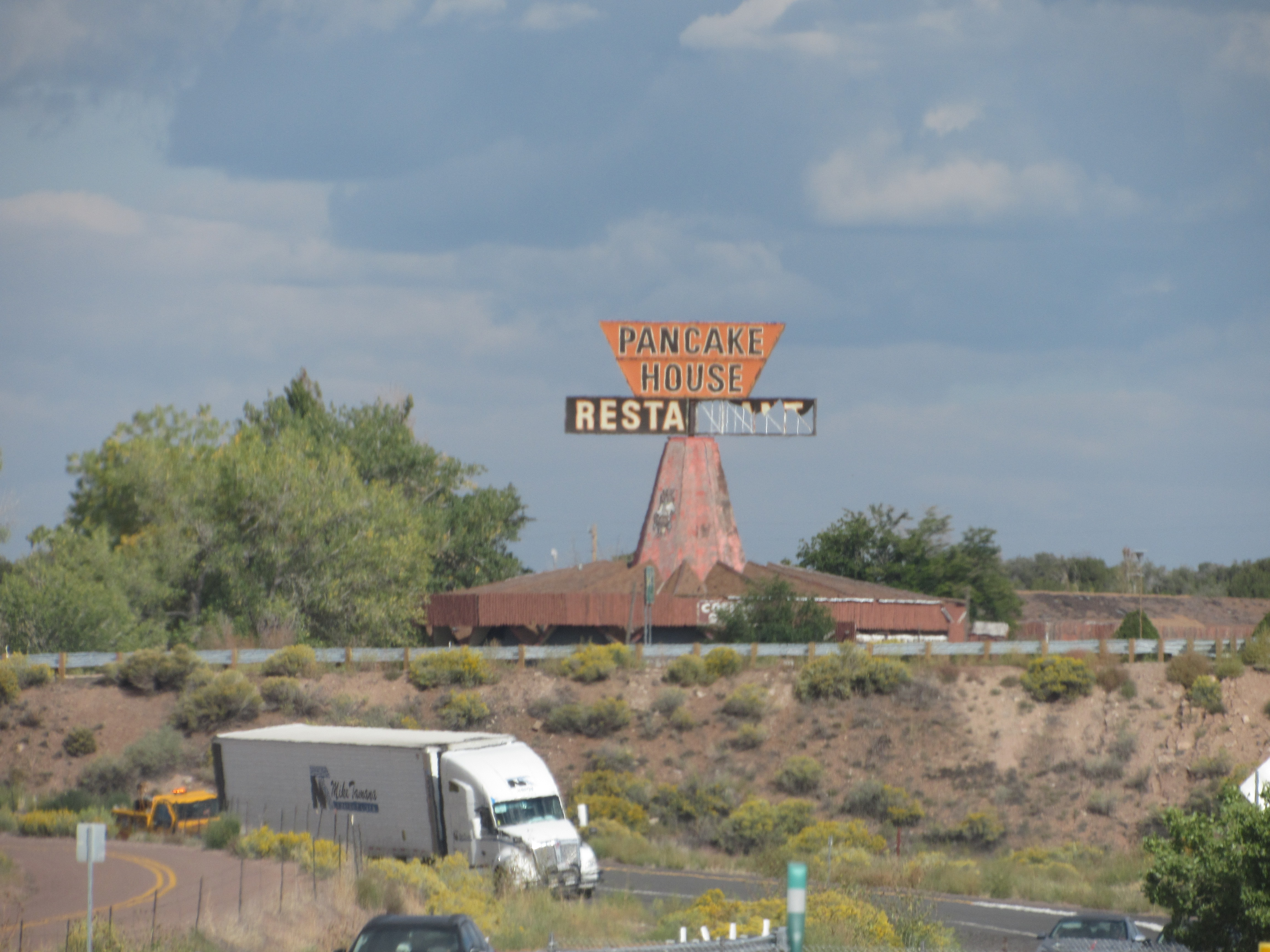
The remains of a pancake house peaks above the horizon in Houck, AZ

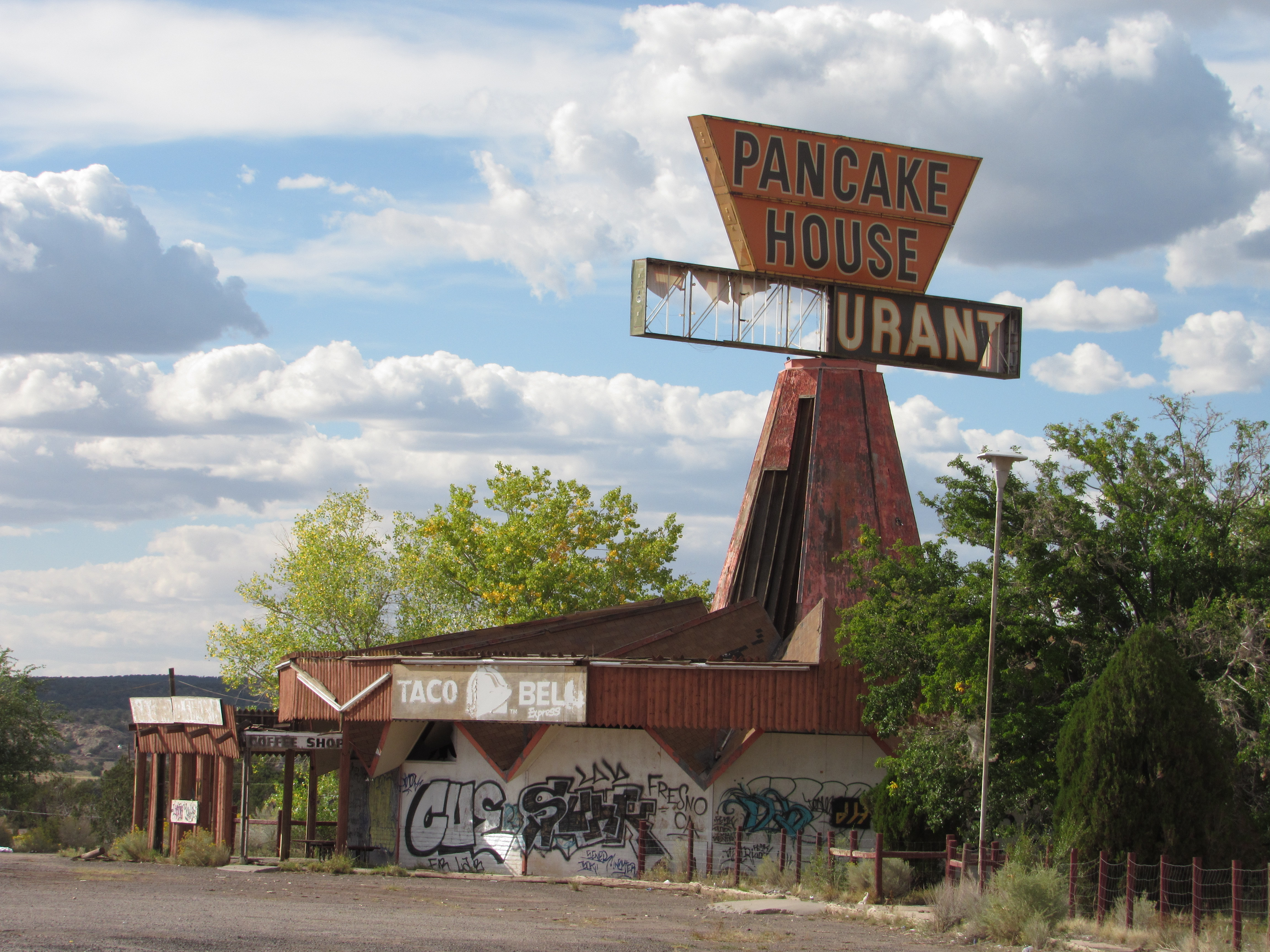
Remains of a building originally built as a Van de Kamp's Dutch Holland Bakery

== See also ==
- List of census-designated places in Arizona
