= Valley High School (Apache County, Arizona) =

Coordinates: 35°11′57″N 109°18′49″W

Valley Sanders High School

Location
- Dine' Tah Boulevard & Red Sand View; Sanders, Arizona 86512; United States

Information
- School type: Public high school
- Motto: Excellence & Honor
- School district: Sanders Unified School District
- CEEB code: 030385
- Principal: Verlyn Goldtooth
- Grades: 9-12
- Enrollment: 211 (2023-2024)
- Colors: Blue and gold
- Mascot: Pirate
- Website: www.sandersusd.net/schools/valley-high-school

Valley High School is a high school in Sanders, Arizona. It is the only high school under the jurisdiction of the Sanders Unified School District, which also includes an elementary school and a middle school.

Sanders Valley High School is home to the Fighting Pirates. The school's colors are blue and gold.

The high school is on Navajo reservation land while the elementary and middle Schools reside on Federal land.

Valley Sanders High School is a 2A school.
