= Red Mesa High School =

Public high school in Apache County, Arizona

Coordinates: 36.962466°N 109.381149°W

Location
- N HWY 160; Teec Nos Pos, Arizona 86514; United States

Information
- School type: Public high school
- School district: Red Mesa Unified School District
- CEEB code: 030434
- Principal: Don Lawrence
- Grades: 9–12
- Enrollment: 171 (2023–2024)
- Colors: Red, white and blue
- Mascot: Redskins
- Website: hs.rmusd.net

Red Mesa High School is a high school in Red Mesa in an unincorporated area of Apache County, Arizona, near Teec Nos Pos. It is one of two high schools under the jurisdiction of the Red Mesa Unified School District, along with Red Valley/Cove High School.

Little Dan, a medicine man from Sweetwater, dedicated the A, B, and C Buildings. Before the high school opened, small high school classes met at the elementary school. Red Mesa was originally a part of the Chinle Unified School District. In July 1983 the Red Mesa Unified School District formed, splitting from the Chinle School District. In 1987 the high school gymnasium was completed.

The school operates an FM radio station, KRMH 89.7.

The school's athletic teams are called "The Redskins", a name that many of the members of the community support.

The majority of the school's students are Native American.
