= Shiyazh Pete =

American football player (born 2003)

Dallas Renegades
- Position: Offensive tackle
- Roster status: Unsigned draft pick

Personal information
- Born: May 25, 2003 (age 23); Ronan, Montana, U.S.
- Listed height: 6 ft 9 in (2.06 m)
- Listed weight: 309 lb (140 kg)

Career information
- High school: Shiprock (Shiprock, New Mexico)
- College: New Mexico State (2021–2024); Kentucky (2025)
- NFL draft: 2026: undrafted

Career history
- Dallas Cowboys (2026)*; Dallas Renegades (2027-present)
- * Offseason or practice squad member only

Awards and highlights
- First-team All-Conference USA (2023)
- Stats at ESPN

Shiyazh Tastohyinya Pete (born May 25, 2003) is an American professional football offensive tackle. He played college football for the New Mexico State Aggies and Kentucky Wildcats before signing with the Dallas Cowboys of the National Football League (NFL) as an undrafted free agent.

Pete is the first member of the Navajo Nation to sign with an NFL team. He is also part Salish.

== Early life ==
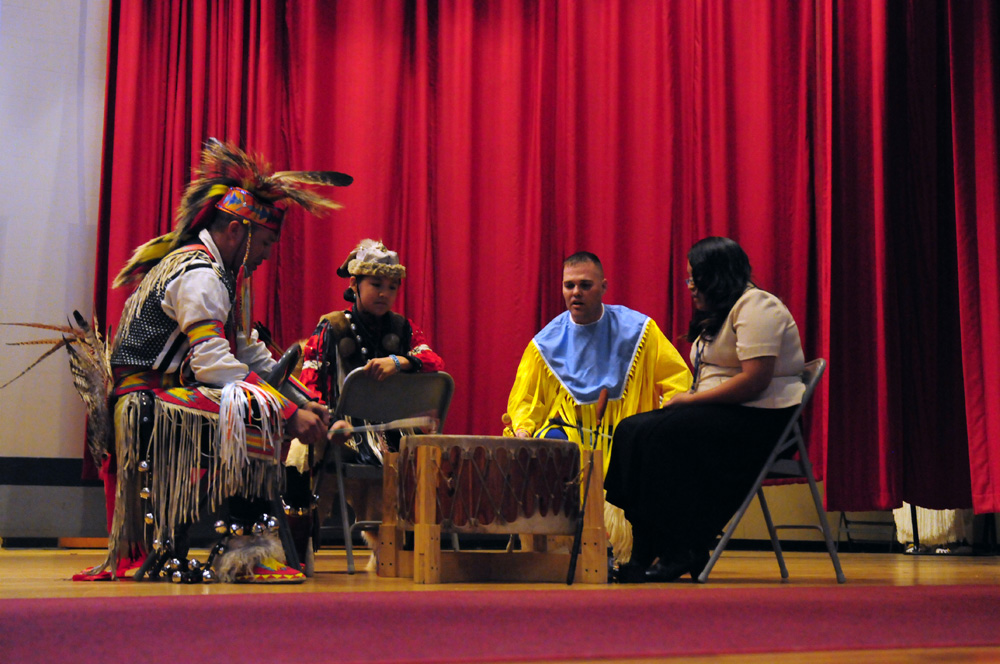
Left to right: Father, 1st Lt. Natani Pete, Shiyazh Pete, special agent Kevin Cheek, sister April Pete at Fort Carson National American Indian Heritage Month Observance in 2013

Pete was born on May 25, 2003, in Ronan, Montana, on the Flathead Indian Reservation. His father, Natani, is from the Navajo and Salish tribes and hails from Arlee, Montana, while his mother, Geraldine, is Navajo and comes from Tółikan (Sweetwater), Arizona. Pete grew up in Missoula, Montana, where he practiced a variety of sports including judo, earning a yellow belt, and winning a gold medal at the 2011 Big Sky State Games in the ages 8–9 division. His family moved around often; he later lived in Colorado, Arizona, and New Mexico. Pete first played football in the seventh grade. He also participated in basketball, wrestling, track and field, and cross country, and focused on football.

Pete and his family settled in Apache County, Arizona, on the Navajo reservation around the time he started high school. He initially enrolled at Red Valley/Cove High School in Red Valley, Arizona, which did not have a football team, before his teachers recommended he switch to a larger school for both athletic and academic reasons. Pete transferred to nearby Shiprock High School in Shiprock, New Mexico, and joined the football team as a sophomore. By his junior year, he was a starter on both the offensive and defensive lines. As a senior, Pete was named first-team all-district on offense and second-team all-district on defense. The COVID-19 pandemic disrupted the season, (Note: Shiprock's 2020 season consisted of a shortened five-game schedule in the spring of 2021.) which affected his recruiting. Pete sent his highlights out to colleges, but he otherwise had few resources available to him on the reservation. He received several offers from NCAA Division II and Division III programs, including particular interest from Western New Mexico University.

Pete committed to play college football at New Mexico State University (NMSU) as a walk-on, signing with the Aggies on April 30, 2021.

== College career ==
=== New Mexico State ===
As a freshman at NMSU in 2021, Pete was redshirted and spent time on the practice squad. In 2022, he began the season as a backup left tackle before being promoted to the starting job for the final nine games of the season. The Aggies won the Quick Lane Bowl that season and set a program record with 25 rushing touchdowns.

In 2023, Pete started all 15 games at left tackle, helping the Aggies to a 10–5 record and an appearance in the New Mexico Bowl. It marked the team's first 10-win season and first back-to-back bowl game berth since 1960. Pete started in NMSU's 34–10 upset win over Auburn at Jordan–Hare Stadium on November 18, 2023. Despite playing the season with a cast due to a dislocated thumb, he earned first-team All-Conference USA honors for his performance. Ahead of his redshirt junior season in 2024, Pete was named to the preseason watchlist for both the Outland Trophy and the Lombardi Award. However, he suffered an ankle injury in fall camp and missed the first six games of the season. Upon his return to play, Pete started the final six games of the year at left tackle. He originally planned to remain at NMSU for his final year of eligibility, but decided to reconsider his options following the departure of his offensive line coach, Andrew Mitchell. After the 2024 season, Pete entered the NCAA transfer portal. He was rated as the No. 16 and No. 20 offensive tackle in the portal by On3.com and 247Sports, respectively. Pete received offers from programs such as Iowa State, Kentucky, Michigan, Nebraska, Oklahoma State, Stanford, USC, and Vanderbilt. On January 19, 2025, he verbally committed to the Kentucky Wildcats.

=== Kentucky ===
Pete signed with the Wildcats on the final day of the winter transfer window. He enrolled at Kentucky in January 2025, in time for winter workouts and spring practices. Despite taking a visit to Vanderbilt, where his former head coach Jerry Kill had been hired, Pete told the Lexington Herald-Leader that he had chosen the Wildcats due to the team's pro-style offense. He was named the starting left tackle ahead of their 2025 season opener against Toledo. Pete went on to start all 12 games at left tackle that year. He was also named one of four team captains for their game against Southeastern Conference (SEC) foe South Carolina.

Pete accepted an invitation to play in the Hula Bowl to close his college career.

== Professional career ==
Pre-draft measurables
Height	Weight	Arm length	Hand span	Wingspan	40-yard dash	10-yard split	20-yard split	20-yard shuttle	Three-cone drill	Vertical jump	Broad jump	Bench press
6 ft 8 3/4 in (2.05 m)	309 lb (140 kg)	34 1/8 in (0.87 m)	10 5/8 in (0.27 m)	7 ft 0 1/4 in (2.14 m)	5.46 s	1.89 s	3.08 s	5.08 s	8.06 s	26.5 in (0.67 m)	8 ft 0 in (2.44 m)	18 reps
All values from Pro Day

Pete participated in Kentucky's pro day on March 11, 2026. Pete was ranked as the 36th-best offensive tackle prospect in the draft by ESPN analyst Jordan Reid, was ranked as the 46th-best offensive tackle by ESPN analyst Mel Kiper Jr., and was ranked as the 54th-best offensive tackle in the draft by The Athletic analyst Dane Brugler. He went unselected in the 2026 NFL draft.

Pete signed an undrafted free agent deal with the Dallas Cowboys soon thereafter. He had been scouted by Dallas offensive line coach Conor Riley at Kentucky's pro day the previous month. Pete, who immediately reported to rookie minicamp, was the first player from the Navajo Nation to sign with an NFL team. He was congratulated by Buu Nygren, the President of the Navajo Nation, who wrote: "Shiyazh Pete represents more than football. He represents where he comes from, the work it takes to get here, and the pride of our people."

Pete made his professional debut in the Cowboys' preseason opener against the Seattle Seahawks on August 15, 2026. Dallas won 17–7. The following week, Pete played in a road matchup against the Arizona Cardinals. Navajo Nation members attended the game in large numbers and gave Pete a standing ovation as he left the field following the 34–13 win. Navajo Nation President Buu Nygren also attended. Head coach Brian Schottenheimer asked Pete to address the team in the locker room after the game. The Cowboys released video of his remarks the following morning, and it circulated widely online.

Pete appeared in all three preseason games before he was waived by the Cowboys on August 30 as a part of final roster cuts. On November 19, 2026, Pete was drafted in the 8th round (59th overall) in the 2027 UFL draft by the Dallas Renegades.

== Personal life ==
Pete draws on his Navajo and Salish heritage in describing his approach to football. His father was in the U.S. Marine Corps before becoming a Captain in the U.S. Army, and his mother is an educator. Pete can speak basic Navajo; he has taken lessons about Navajo tradition, has danced at powwows, and has "dabbled" in the didgeridoo. "I'd say [tradition] plays a large part in my life. It's a part of my core beliefs as a person and something I'll carry on with me for the rest of my life," he said in 2021. In his final collegiate season in 2025, Pete was one of five Native Americans playing Division I football that year, including the only one in the Southeastern Conference (SEC), according to the NCAA. He was also described by the Lexington Herald-Leader as "one of the highest profile Native American athletes in the country."

Pete has been noted for his respectful and kind demeanor and good sportsmanship, as well as his thoughtful responses to reporters. He entered NMSU as a computer science major, but changed it to communications after incoming head coach Jerry Kill moved practice time to the morning, interfering with his schedule. The new coaching staff awarded Pete a full scholarship. Upon his transfer to Kentucky, he continued taking online classes at NMSU to finish his bachelor's degree (which he earned in May 2025) while concurrently studying towards a graduate certificate in public administration at Kentucky.

Aside from speaking English and Navajo, he also knows basic American Sign Language.
