= Rio Grande White Ware =

Pottery traditions

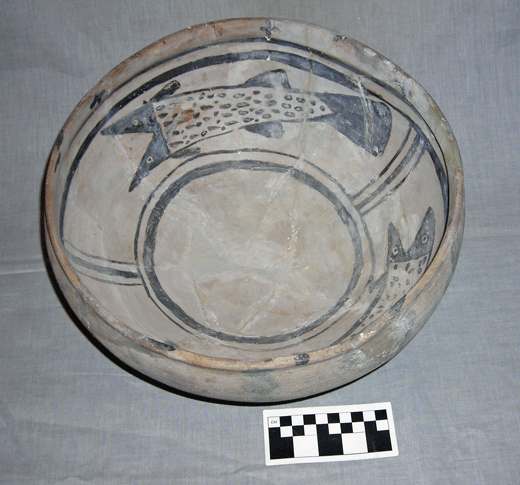
Biscuit A bowl

The Rio Grande white wares comprise multiple pottery traditions of the prehistoric Puebloan peoples of New Mexico. About AD 750, the beginning of the Pueblo I Era, after adhering to a different and widespread regional ceramic tradition (the Cibola White Ware tradition) for generations, potters of the Rio Grande region of New Mexico began developing distinctly local varieties of black-on-white pottery. This pottery involved the use of black mineral paint (mostly before AD 1200) or black vegetal paint (mostly after AD 1200) on a white, off-white, or light gray background. The black-on-white tradition finally died out about AD 1750.

Archaeologists divide the Rio Grande white wares into arbitrary types with much shorter life spans, primarily to help them date sites. Individual potsherds are assigned to types based on a combination of attributes including paste, temper, slip, paint composition, and design styles.

== Overview and cautions ==
The Rio Grande white wares were made along the Rio Grande and adjacent valleys, from the Taos area south to San Marcial. The hallmark of Rio Grande white wares (as for the northern ancestral Puebloan peoples as a whole, from AD 500 to 1300) is the use of black painted designs on smoothed, often slipped, and sometimes polished white or light gray backgrounds. This combination of colors was achieved by firing pottery in a reducing (oxygen-starved) atmosphere. Despite these commonalities, the various Rio Grande traditions are only loosely related; the common thread is that each group of potters pursued variations on the regional black-on-white decorative tradition. When the various types are grouped, as is done here, it is primarily as a matter of classificatory convenience.

The earliest black-on-white pottery made in the region was part of the Cibola White Ware tradition, which extended across the southeastern Colorado Plateau and into areas to the east and south. Thus, for example, Red Mesa Black-on-white of the Cibola tradition is common on Rio Grande region sites of the Pueblo II. In time, however, distinctly local pottery traditions arose. At first, as in the early Cibola White Ware tradition, the black paint used to paint pottery was mineral based. (For Arroyo Hondo Pueblo outside Santa Fe, Habicht-Mauche [1993:15–17] classifies the local mineral-painted white wares as the "Rio Grande Series" of Cibola White Ware rather than as a separate tradition.) After AD 1200, organic-based black paint (which reduces to amorphous graphite during firing) became the norm (Wendorf and Reed 1955). After 1750, the black-on-white pottery tradition had died out completely among Rio Grande Puebloan peoples. Some modern potters, especially those at Acoma Pueblo, have revived the tradition.

Archaeologists divide the Rio Grande white wares into a number of types. what follows is not an exhaustive typology (those can be found in the references provided). Rather, it is just extensive enough to allow non-specialists to understand the reasons for the existing named distinctions.

== Named variants ==
One local variant on the Cibola tradition, San Marcial Black-on-white (AD 750–950) was used along the Rio Grande between Cochiti and Elephant Butte Reservoir. San Marcial was inspired by early vessels of the Cibola White Ware tradition, and similarly had simple painted designs of the Pueblo I tradition were executed in black mineral paint. San Marcial can be distinguished from the early Cibola types by its off-white paste containing sand and crushed rock (hornblende-latite) temper, and by thick vessel walls with polished but usually unslipped surfaces (Marshall and Walt 1984:37; Mera 1935:25; Wilson 2005:22). Later in the same general area, Socorro Black-on-white (AD 1050–1300) was characterized by carefully prepared designs using deep black, finely crazed mineral paint on a thin slip. The designs included combinations of solids and line hatching. Bowls were painted on the interiors only (Hawley 1950:36; Wilson 2005:25).

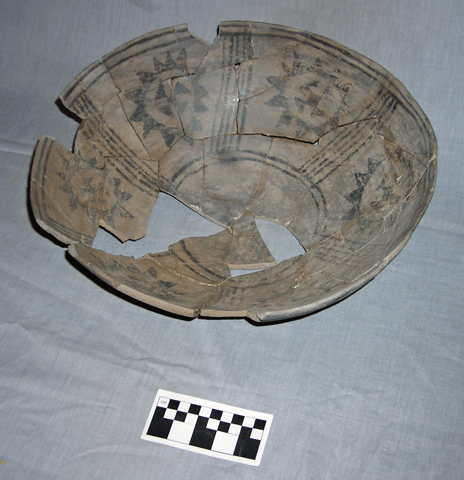
Shallow Wiyo Black-on-white bowl

A different local black-on-white tradition, featuring designs painted on bowl interiors, began with Kwahe’e Black-on-white (AD 1050–1250). This type was derived from the Cibola tradition and, like that tradition, featured mineral-based black paint and sherd-tempered paste. Hawley (1950:35P called Kwahe'e "An isolated northern Rio Grande form of Escavada Black on White" [of the Cibola tradition]. Habicht-Mauche (1993:15) takes a slightly different view of Kwahe'e: "Clearly an indigenous product, it marks the beginning of a succession of black-on-white types unique to the northern Rio Grande area." She acknowledges, however, "Stylistic influences from the west and northwest" (Habicht-Mauche 1993:15). While Escavada vessels tend to have obvious white slips, Kwahe’e vessels are unslipped or thinly slipped, and the designs are less well executed (Hawley 1950:35; Mera 1935:5–6; Wilson 2005:26).

For pieces produced after 1200, when potters changed to a watery-looking organic black paint, the type name for this local tradition changes to Santa Fe Black-on-white (AD 1250–1350) (Hawley 1950:68–69; Wilson 2005:28). After 1300, the slip became whiter and the paint blacker, while the designs were carefully polished over. Such vessels, known as Wiyo Black-on-white (AD 1300–1400), can tentatively be ascribed to the prehistoric Tewa (Hawley 1950:70; Mera 1935; Wilson 2005:29).

Vessels of a third, post-1300 tradition is classified as Galisteo Black-on-white (AD 1300–1400). The interior slip is thick, white, often pearly, and distinctly “crackled.” Sherds of Galisteo Black-on-white are further distinguished from Santa Fe and Wiyo Black-on-white by having a darker core or “carbon streak” when viewed in cross-section. Angular crushed sherd temper is prominent. Bowl decorations are on the interiors only (Wilson 2005:34). Rim ticking (widely spaced spots of paint on rims) occurs, suggesting a possible link to earlier white wares of the Mesa Verde region. Hawley (1950:69) asserted that in the central and western portion of its range, Galisteo Black-on-white “is so similar to Mesa Verde Black on White that it can be distinguished only by detailed observations.” A somewhat cruder local variant with soft paste, Rowe Black-on-white, was made in the upper Santa Fe and upper Pecos drainages (Hawley 1950:69; Wilson 2005:35).

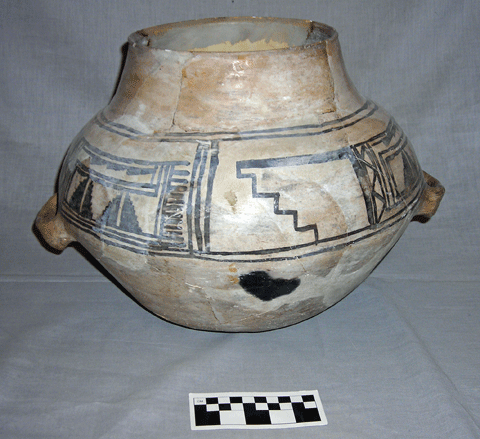
Jemez Black-on-white jar

A fourth series of types was made in the Jemez River drainage. Vallecitos Black-on-white (AD 1250–1400) features bowl interiors with thorough polishing over dark black paint and a thick white slip. Rim ticking is common, again suggesting connections to the white ware tradition of the Mesa Verde region. Bowl exteriors were unpainted. The subsequent type in this series, Jemez Black-on-white (AD 1300–1750) includes painted designs on the exteriors (Hawley 1950:70–71; Mera 1935: 22–23; Wilson 2005:36–37).

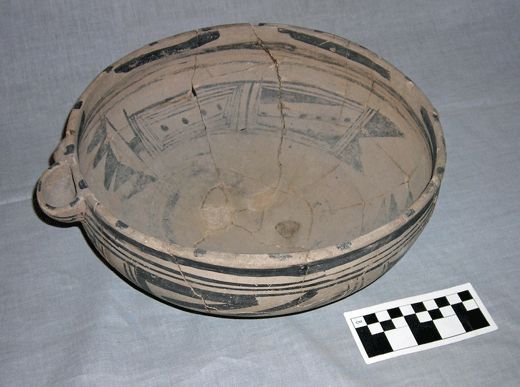
Biscuit B bowl

After 1375, potters in the Pajarito Plateau area and northward turned to a soft, porous gray paste that resulted in thicker, distinctly gray vessels. Biscuit A (or Abiquiu Black-on-gray) bowls were slipped and decorated on the interiors only; they date from AD 1375 to 1450. Biscuit B (or Bandelier Black-on-gray) bowls are slipped and decorated on both surfaces; they date from AD 1400 to 1550 (Wilson 2005:31–32). Sankawi Black-on-cream (AD 1500–1650) features cream-colored surfaces, thinner walls and harder paste, the color of which has a reddish tinge. Afterwards, the design scheme changed to include red paint, resulting in today's Tewa Polychrome tradition (Wilson 2005:38).

Even farther north are types restricted to the Taos area. Taos Black-on-white (AD 1150–1250) features Dogoszhi style (hachured) designs, albeit poorly executed, in black mineral paint on white polished slips (Mera 1935:6; Wilson 2005:24). Vadito Black-on-white (AD 1325–1600) features black organic paint on white-slipped backgrounds.
