= U.S. Route 160 in New Mexico =

Section of U.S. Highway in New Mexico, United States

U.S. Highway 160
- US 160 highlighted in red

Route information
- Maintained by NMDOT
- Length: 0.891 mi (1,434 m)
- Existed: 1970–present

Major junctions
- West end: US 160 at the Arizona state line
- NM 597 near the Four Corners Monument
- East end: US 160 at the Colorado state line

Location
- Country: United States
- State: New Mexico
- Counties: San Juan

Highway system
- United States Numbered Highway System; List; Special; Divided; New Mexico State Highway System; Interstate; US; State; Scenic
← NM 159	→ NM 161

U.S. Route 160 (US 160) is a U.S. Highway in the extreme northwestern corner of New Mexico near the Four Corners area.

== Route description ==
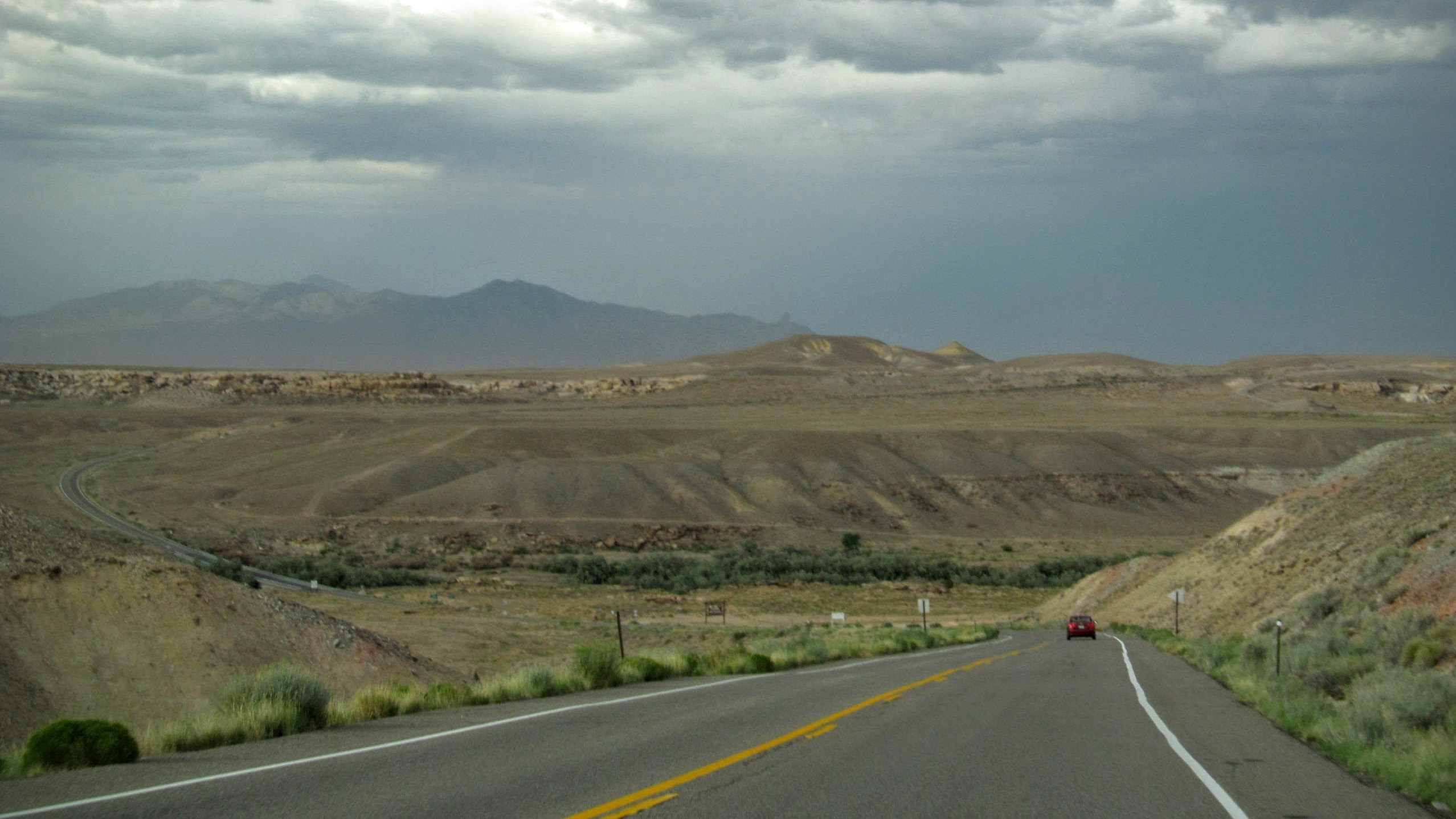
US 160 north of the road to Four Corners

US 160 enters New Mexico from Arizona on a two-lane highway that heads northeast through the arid, rolling plains of the Navajo section of the Colorado Plateau. Approximately 0.3 miles (480 m) into the state is an intersection with New Mexico State Road 597 (NM 597), a short highway that leads to the Four Corners Monument, which lies on the quadripoint of Arizona, New Mexico, Colorado, and Utah. US 160 continues to the northeast and descends into the San Juan River valley, but the highway crosses into Colorado before reaching the river.

== History ==
U.S. Highway 164
- Location: Flagstaff, AZ–Cortez, CO
- Existed: 1965–1970

US 160 was originally designated as US 164 in 1965. A proposal to renumber the highway to US 160 was deferred by the American Association of State Highway Officials (AASHO; now AASHTO) in 1969 and approved the following year.

== Major intersections ==
The entire route is in San Juan County.

Location	mi	km	Destinations	Notes
	0.000	0.000	US 160 west – Teec Nos Pos, Flagstaff	Continuation into Arizona
	0.290	0.467	NM 597 north – Four Corners Monument	Southern terminus of NM 597
	0.891	1.434	US 160 east – Durango	Continuation into Colorado
1.000 mi = 1.609 km; 1.000 km = 0.621 mi

U.S. Route 160
Previous state: Arizona	New Mexico	Next state: Colorado
