= New Mexico State Road 597 =

State highway in New Mexico, United States

State Road 597
- 4 Corners Road
- NM 597 highlighted in red

Route information
- Maintained by NMDOT
- Length: 0.447 mi (719 m)

Major junctions
- South end: US 160 southeast of Four Corners
- North end: Four Corners Monument

Location
- Country: United States
- State: New Mexico
- Counties: San Juan

Highway system
- New Mexico State Highway System; Interstate; US; State; Scenic
← NM 595	→ NM 598

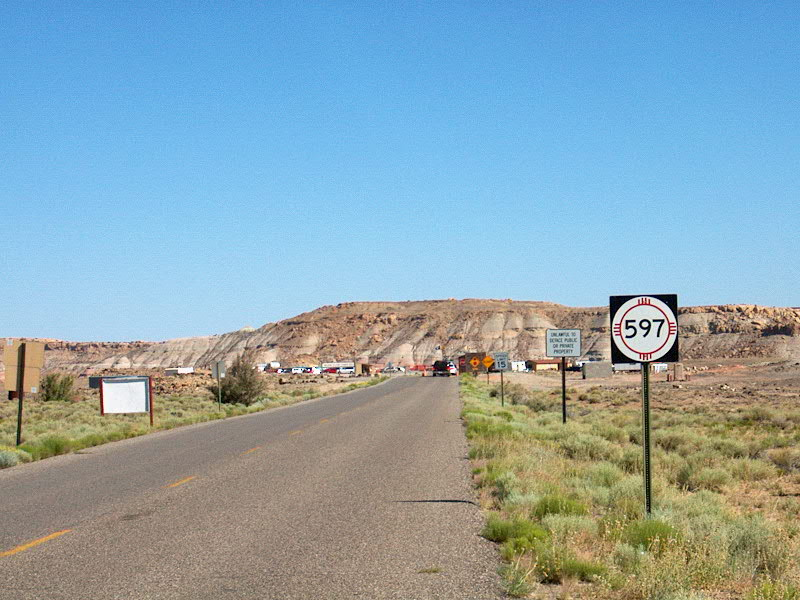
Looking towards the northern terminus

State Road 597 (NM 597) is a 0.447-mile-long (719 m) state highway located entirely on the Navajo Nation in San Juan County, New Mexico, United States. The highway serves to link U.S. Route 160 (US 160) to the Four Corners Monument. The highway is the second shortest highway in New Mexico; the shortest is NM 446 at 0.250 miles (402 m).

== Route description ==
NM 597 begins at a T-intersection with US 160 in extreme northwestern San Juan County. Traveling northwesterly, the two-lane highway passes through desert terrain to its northern terminus at a toll booth. After passing the toll booth, the road becomes 4 Corners Road, that leads up to Four Corners Monument. The highway's posted speed limit is 15 miles per hour (24 km/h).

The highway is the second shortest highway in New Mexico; the shortest is NM 446 at 0.250 miles (402 m).

== Major intersections ==
The entire route is in San Juan County.

Location	mi	km	Destinations	Notes
	0.000	0.000	US 160 – Teec Nos Pos, Cortez	Southern terminus
	0.447	0.719	Four Corners Monument	Northern terminus; road continues as 4 Corners Road
1.000 mi = 1.609 km; 1.000 km = 0.621 mi

== See also ==
- List of New Mexico State Roads shorter than one mile
