= List of U.S. Routes in New Mexico =

- Standard route signage in New Mexico
- U.S. Highways in New Mexico highlighted in red

System information
- Length: 2,980.838 mi (Note: Sum of the mileage of current U.S. Routes listed, and cited, on this page.) (4,797.194 km)

Highway names
- Interstates: Interstate XX (I-XX)
- US Highways: U.S. Route XX (US XX)
- State: State Road XX (NM XX)

System links
- New Mexico State Highway System; Interstate; US; State; Scenic

U.S. Routes in the U.S. state of New Mexico account for 2,980.838 miles (4,797.194 km) of the state highway system. The first United States Numbered Highways U.S. Routes were formed in 1926, and served as the primary thoroughfares across the entire state. Twenty six of the 33 counties in New Mexico are served by current U.S. Routes. The only counties lacking U.S. Route coverage are: Bernalillo, Cibola, Harding, Los Alamos, Mora, Sierra, and Valencia.

One decommissioned U.S. Route, U.S. Route 66, colloquially known as the nation's Mother Road, and briefly known as U.S. Route 60, crossed through Northern New Mexico, connecting the cities of Albuquerque and Gallup. The state recognized its historical value, and has posted commemorative signs, and has painted the old shield on some of the roadways that make up the path of the former highway, such as New Mexico State Road 333. Other highways have been renamed or renumbered, such as U.S. Route 491, which was formerly U.S. Route 666. With the 666 designation, the road was nicknamed Devil's Highway because of the common Christian belief that 666 is the Number of the Beast. The effort to get the route renumbered was led by New Mexico Governor Bill Richardson.

The longest current U.S. Route in New Mexico is U.S. Route 70, spanning 448.264 miles (721.411 km) across southern New Mexico, while the shortest is U.S. Route 160, which clips the extreme northwestern corner of the state, measuring 0.86 miles (1.38 km) long between the Arizona and Colorado borders. U.S. Route 160, in conjunction with New Mexico State Road 597, provide access to the Four Corners Monument where the states of Arizona, New Mexico, Colorado, and Utah meet.

== List ==
Number	Length (mi)	Length (km)	Southern or western terminus	Northern or eastern terminus	Formed	Removed	Notes
US 54	356.076	573.049	US 54 at the Texas state line	US 54 at the Texas state line	1926	current	
US 56	94.172	151.555	I-25 Bus. in Springer	US 56 / US 64 / US 412 at the Oklahoma state line	1957	current	
US 60	397.895	640.350	US 60 at the Arizona state line	US 60 at the Texas state line	1931	current	
US 62	109.710	176.561	US 62 at the Texas state line	US 62 at the Texas state line	1932	current	
US 64	430.634	693.038	US 64 at the Arizona state line	US 56 / US 64 / US 412 at the Oklahoma state line	1926	current	
US 66	—	—	US 66 at the Arizona state line	US 66 at the Texas state line	1926	1985	Replaced by I-40; also known as the Mother Road
US 70	448.264	721.411	US 70 at the Arizona state line	US 70 / US 84 at the Texas state line	1926	current	
US 80	—	—	US 80 at the Arizona state line	US 80 at the Texas state line	1926	1991	Replaced by I-10; formed part of the Dixie Overland Highway
US 82	192.557	309.890	US 54 near Alamogordo	US 82 at the Texas state line	1960	current	
US 84	357.47	575.29	US 70 / US 84 at the Texas state line	US 84 at the Colorado state line	1936	current	
US 85	483	777	US 85 at the Texas state line	US 85 at the Colorado state line	1926	current	Replaced by I-10 and I-25; New Mexico portion still recognized by AASHTO
US 87	99.85	160.69	US 87 at the Texas state line	US 87 at the Colorado state line	—	—	
US 160	0.861	1.386	US 160 at the Arizona state line	US 160 at the Colorado state line	—	—	Was formerly US 164
US 164	—	—	US 164 at the Arizona state line	US 164 at the Colorado state line	—	—	Renumbered US 160
US 180	245.77	395.53	US 180 at the Arizona state line	US 180 at the Texas state line	—	—	
US 180	111.71	179.78	US 62 / US 180 at the Texas state line	US 62 / US 180 at the Texas state line	—	—	
US 285	412.654	664.102	US 285 at the Texas state line	US 285 at the Colorado state line	—	—	
US 366	—	—	US 366 at the Texas state line	US 566 near Lincoln	1926	—	Replaced by US 54
US 380	242.092	389.609	I-25 near San Antonio	US 380 at the Texas state line	—	—	
US 385	—	—	US 64	US 385 at the Texas state line	1926	—	Replaced by US 87
US 412	94.172	151.555	I-25 Bus. in Springer	US 56 / US 64 / US 412 at the Oklahoma state line	—	—	
US 485	—	—	US 85 near Santa Fe	US 85 near Raton	1926	1933	Replaced by US 64
US 491	107.308	172.695	I-40 / NM 602 in Gallup	US 491 at the Colorado state line	—	—	Was formerly US 666
US 550	174.885	281.450	I-25 in Bernalillo	US 550 at the Colorado state line	—	—	
US 566	—	—	US 85 near Socorro	US 70 in Clovis	1926	1932	Replaced by US 380
US 666	—	—	I-40 / NM 602 in Gallup	US 666 at the Colorado state line	1926	2003	Renumbered US 491; also known as the Devil's Highway
US 789	—	—	Arizona state line	Colorado state line	—	—	Proposed, but never commissioned; would have been co-signed with US 66 then US 666
Former

== Special routes ==
Number	Length (mi)	Length (km)	Southern or western terminus	Northern or eastern terminus	Formed	Removed	Notes
US 54 Bus.	—	—	—	—	—	—	Serves Alamogordo
US 54 Bus.	2.410	3.879	—	—	—	—	Serves Tucumcari
US 64 Bus.	3.1	5.0	—	—	—	—	Serves Farmington
US 70 Bus.	—	—	—	—	—	—	Serves Alamogordo
US 70 Bus.	—	—	—	—	—	—	Served Ruidoso
US 70 Truck	7.5	12.1	—	—	—	—	Serves Roswell
US 70 Bus.	—	—	—	—	—	—	Served Portales
US 80 Alt.	—	—	Las Cruces	Anthony	—	—	
US 82 Truck	—	—	—	—	—	—	Serves Artesia
US 82 Truck	—	—	—	—	—	—	Serves Lovington
US 85 Alt.	—	—	Anthony	Las Cruces	—	—	
US 85 Byp.	—	—	—	—	—	—	Served Santa Fe
US 85 Alt.	—	—	Barelas	Alameda	—	—	
US 285 Alt.	—	—	Artesia	South Springs Acres	—	—	
US 285 Truck	—	—	—	—	—	—	Serves Roswell
US 285 Alt.	—	—	—	—	—	—	Served Santa Fe
US 285 Byp.	—	—	—	—	—	—	Served Santa Fe
Former
