= KRMH =

KRMA may refer to:

- KRMH (Arizona)
- KRMH (Texas)
