= KRMH (FM) =

- Red Mesa, Arizona; United States
- Frequency: 89.7 MHz
- Branding: Redskin Radio

Programming
- Format: Variety

Ownership
- Owner: Red Mesa High School; (Red Mesa Unified School District No. 27)

History
- First air date: 1998
- Call sign meaning: Red Mesa High

Technical information
- Licensing authority: FCC
- Facility ID: 82109
- Class: A
- ERP: 4,500 watts
- HAAT: 41 meters (135 ft)
- Transmitter coordinates: 36°57′48″N 109°22′41.4″W

Links
- Public license information: Public file; LMS

KRMH (89.7 FM) is a high school radio station broadcasting a variety music format and licensed to Red Mesa, Arizona, United States. The station is owned by the Red Mesa Unified School District and operated by Red Mesa High School.
