= Cove, Arizona =

- Populated place
- Location within the state of Arizona Cove, Arizona (the United States)
- Coordinates: 36°33′55″N 109°13′04″W
- Country: United States
- State: Arizona
- County: Apache
- Elevation: 6,378 ft (1,944 m)
- Time zone: UTC-7 (Mountain (MST))
  - Summer (DST): UTC-7 (MST)
- Area code: 928
- FIPS code: 04-16690
- GNIS feature ID: 25261

Cove is a populated place situated in Apache County, Arizona, United States. It has an estimated elevation of 6,378 feet (1,944 m) above sea level.

== Education ==
The Red Mesa Unified School District operates Red Valley/Cove High School.

The Bureau of Indian Education (BIE) operates Cove Day School, a federal K-8 school for Native Americans. Additionally, the BIE operates Red Rock Day School, which takes students from the nearby area, in Red Valley.
