= Red Mesa, Arizona =

CDP in Apache County, Arizona

Red Mesa, Arizona Tsé Łichííʼ Dah Azkání (Navajo)
- Census-designated place
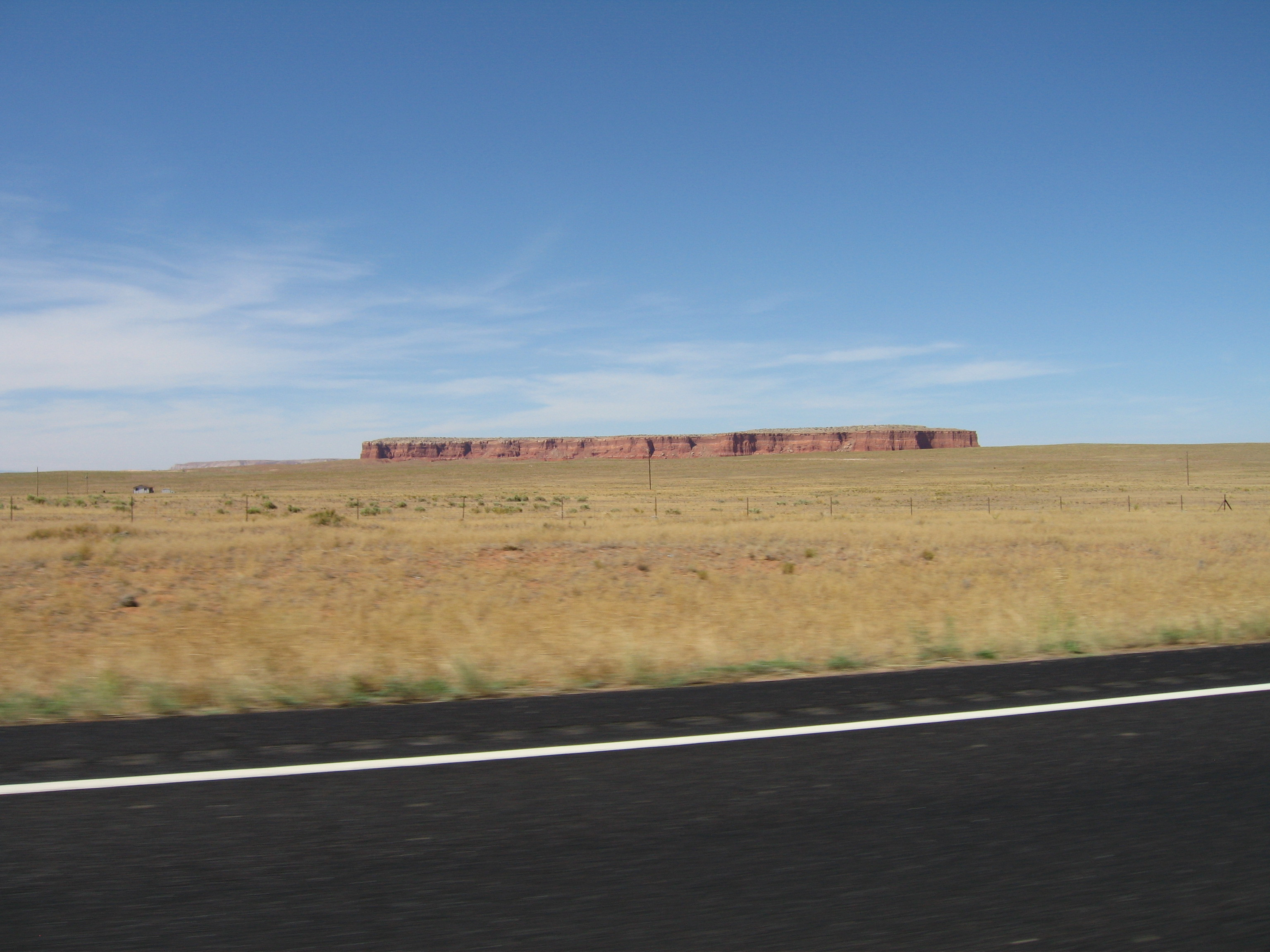
- The eponymous red mesa in Red Mesa, July 2007

- Location in Apache County and the state of Arizona

- Location in the United States
- Coordinates: 36°57′58″N 109°21′51″W
- Country: United States
- State: Arizona
- County: Apache

Area
  - Total: 12.85 sq mi (33.27 km^{2})
  - Land: 12.85 sq mi (33.27 km^{2})
  - Water: 0.0039 sq mi (0.01 km^{2})
- Elevation: 5,394 ft (1,644 m)

Population (2020)
  - Total: 354
  - Density: 27.6/sq mi (10.64/km^{2})
- Time zone: UTC-7 (MST)
- ZIP code: 86514
- Area code: 928
- FIPS code: 04-59550
- GNIS feature ID: 2409150

Red Mesa is a census-designated place (CDP) in Apache County, Arizona, United States. The population was 480 at the 2010 census.

== Geography ==
According to the United States Census Bureau, the CDP has a total area of 12.9 square miles (33.3 km^{2}), all land.

== Demographics ==
Historical population
Census	Pop.	Note	%±
2000	237		—
2010	480		102.5%
2020	354		−26.2%
U.S. Decennial Census

As of the census of 2000, there were 237 people, 78 households, and 52 families residing in the CDP. The population density was 18.6 inhabitants per square mile (7.2/km^{2}). There were 102 housing units at an average density of 8.0 per square mile (3.1/km^{2}). The racial makeup of the CDP was 82% Native American, 11% White, 3% Pacific Islander, 2% from other races, with 3% from two or more races. 2% of the population were Hispanic or Latino of any race.

There were 78 households, out of which 45% had children under the age of 18 living with them, 39% were married couples living together, 26% had a female householder with no husband present, and 32% were non-families. 30% of all households were made up of individuals, and 5% had someone living alone who was 65 years of age or older. The average household size was 3.0 and the average family size was 3.9.

In the CDP, the age distribution of the population shows 38% under the age of 18, 9% from 18 to 24, 27% from 25 to 44, 20% from 45 to 64, and 7% who were 65 years of age or older. The median age was 28 years. For every 100 females, there were 73.0 males. For every 100 females age 18 and over, there were 60.9 males.

The median income for a household in the CDP was $22,159, and the median income for a family was $22,159. Males had a median income of $25,357 versus $25,938 for females. The per capita income for the CDP was $6,836. About 33% of families and 44% of the population were below the poverty line, including 49% of those under the age of eighteen and 52% of those 65 or over.

== Education ==
The area is a part of the Red Mesa Unified School District. Red Mesa contains the district headquarters. Three district schools, Red Mesa Elementary School (RMES), Red Mesa Junior High School (RMJHS), and Red Mesa High School are in Red Mesa.

Originally the territory was within the Chinle School District. In July 1983 the Red Mesa Unified School District formed, splitting from the Chinle School District.

== Red Mesa pottery ==
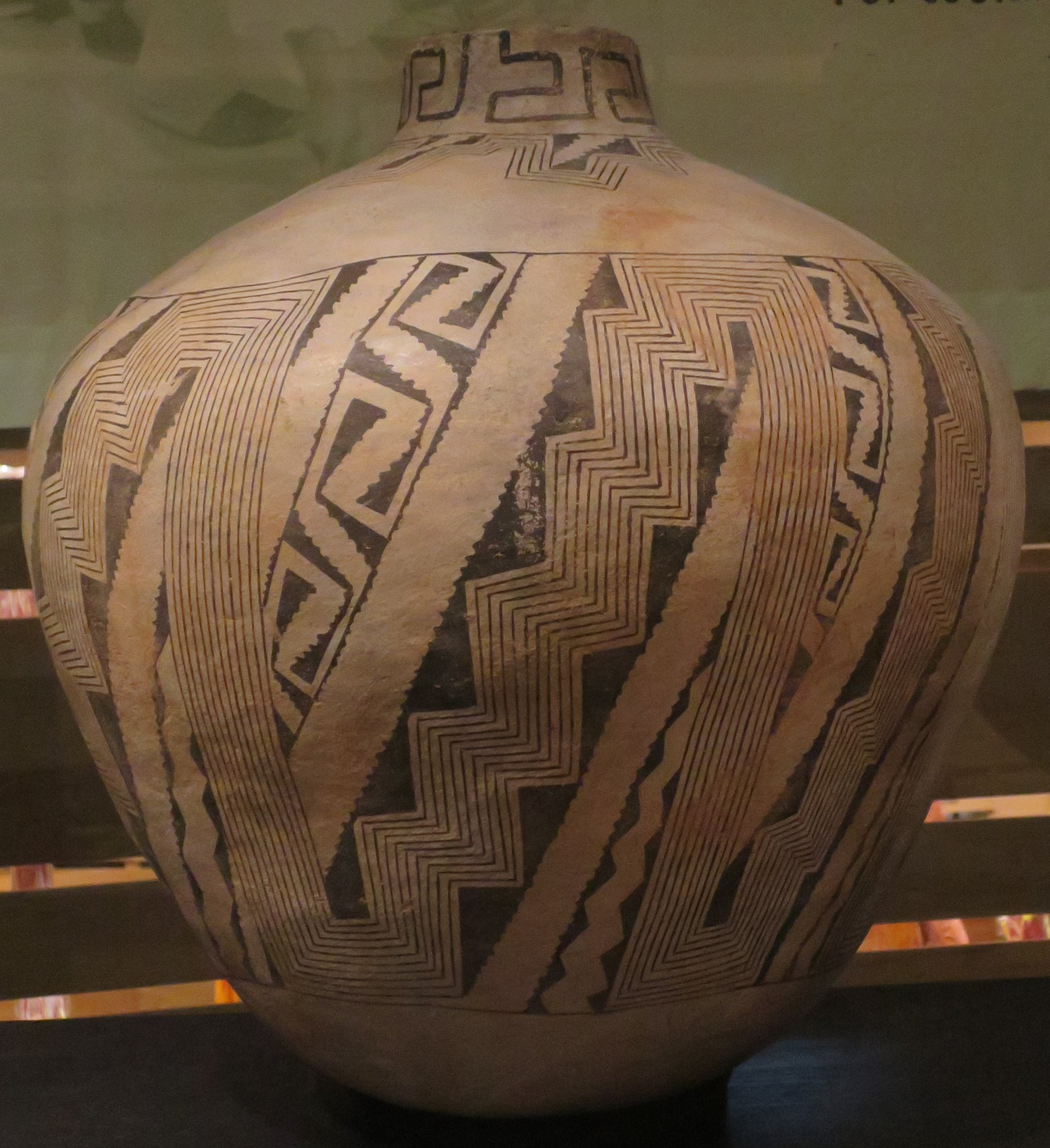
Red Mesa black on white storage jar, 870–1000 CE, Heard Museum.

The Red Mesa prehistoric pottery type was named for this Arizona area. Made from about 950 to 1050 CE, it is a subdivision of Cibola White Ware. Designs are usually banded and can be much busier than earlier types, but simple designs are also common. Pots are usually slipped (often chalky) and polished, but some examples not slipped and not well polished.

== Navajo Nation Council delegates ==
- Kenneth Maryboy

== See also ==
- List of census-designated places in Arizona
