= Red Rock, Apache County, Arizona =

Unincorporated community in the state of Arizona, United States

Red Rock, Arizona
- Census-designated place
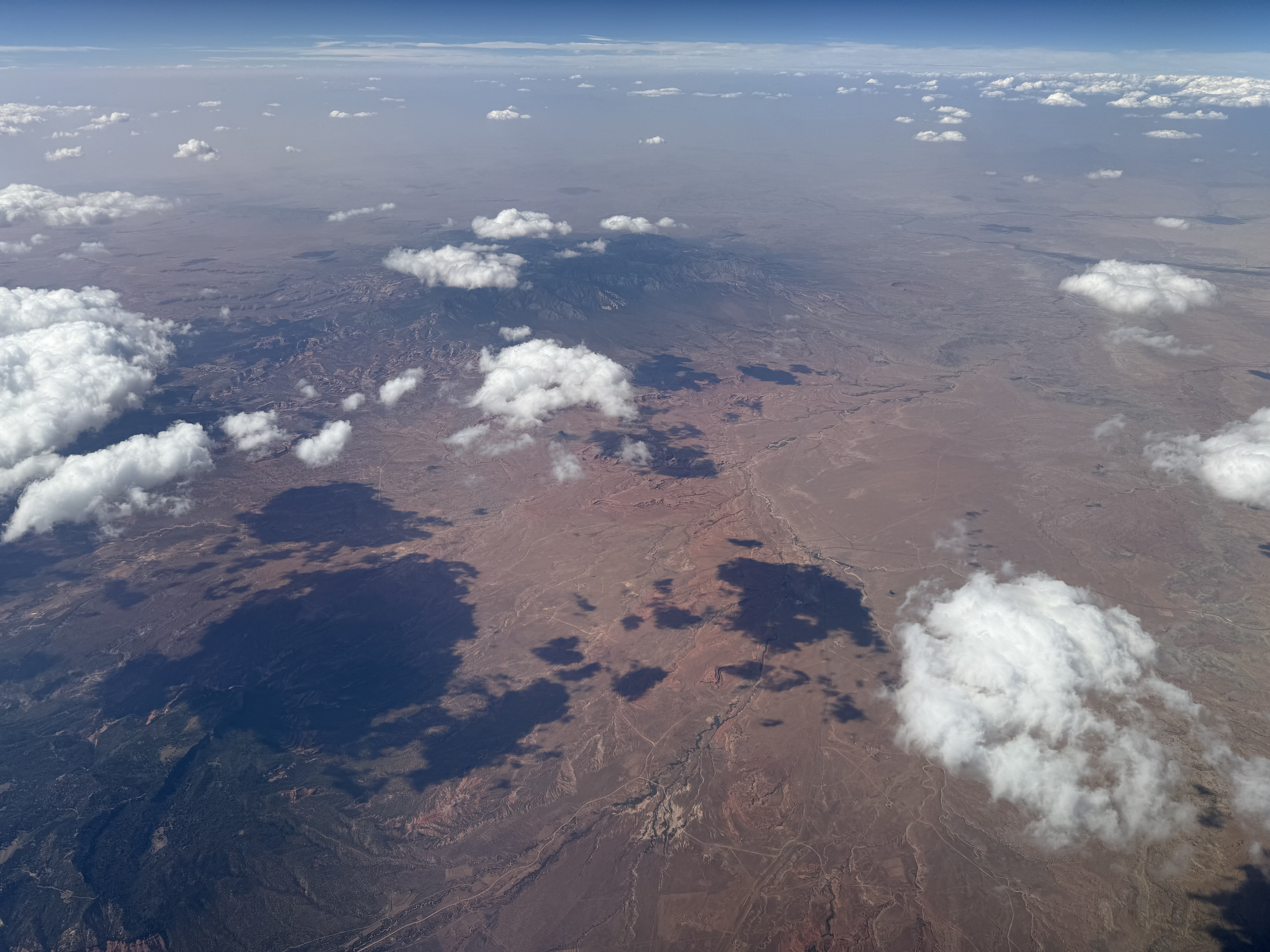
- Aerial view of Red Valley and surrounding areas

- Location within Arizona Location within the United States
- Coordinates: 36°35′56″N 109°03′46″W
- Country: United States
- State: Arizona
- County: Apache

Area
  - Total: 1.17 sq mi (3.02 km^{2})
  - Land: 1.17 sq mi (3.02 km^{2})
  - Water: 0 sq mi (0.00 km^{2})
- Elevation: 5,804 ft (1,769 m)

Population (2020)
  - Total: 136
  - Density: 116.7/sq mi (45.05/km^{2})
- Time zone: UTC-7 (Mountain (MST))
- ZIP code: 86544
- Area code: 928
- FIPS Code: 04-59690
- GNIS feature ID: 2582849

Red Rock (also known as Red Valley; Navajo: Tse’ lichii da az kani’) is an unincorporated community, and census-designated place (CDP) in Apache County, Arizona, United States. Red Rock is located on the Navajo Nation near the New Mexico border, 16 miles (26 km) northeast of Lukachukai. Red Rock has a post office with ZIP code 86544; the post office uses the Red Valley name. As of the 2020 census, the Red Rock CDP had a population of 136.

Red Rock is named after a nearby 386-foot-high (118 m) sandstone peak. The area was first noted by white military men in 1892 when Lt. W. C. Brown observed many springs during a water survey. A trading post was established in 1906.

== Demographics ==
Historical population
Census	Pop.	Note	%±
2020	136		—
U.S. Decennial Census

== Education ==
Red Rock is within the Red Mesa Unified School District, which operates Red Valley/Cove High School.

The Bureau of Indian Education (BIE) operates Red Valley Day School, a federal K-8 school for Native Americans. Additionally, the BIE operates Cove Day School, which takes students from the nearby area.
