= Teec Nos Pos, Arizona =

Teec Nos Pos, Arizona T’iis Názbąs (Navajo)
- Census-designated place
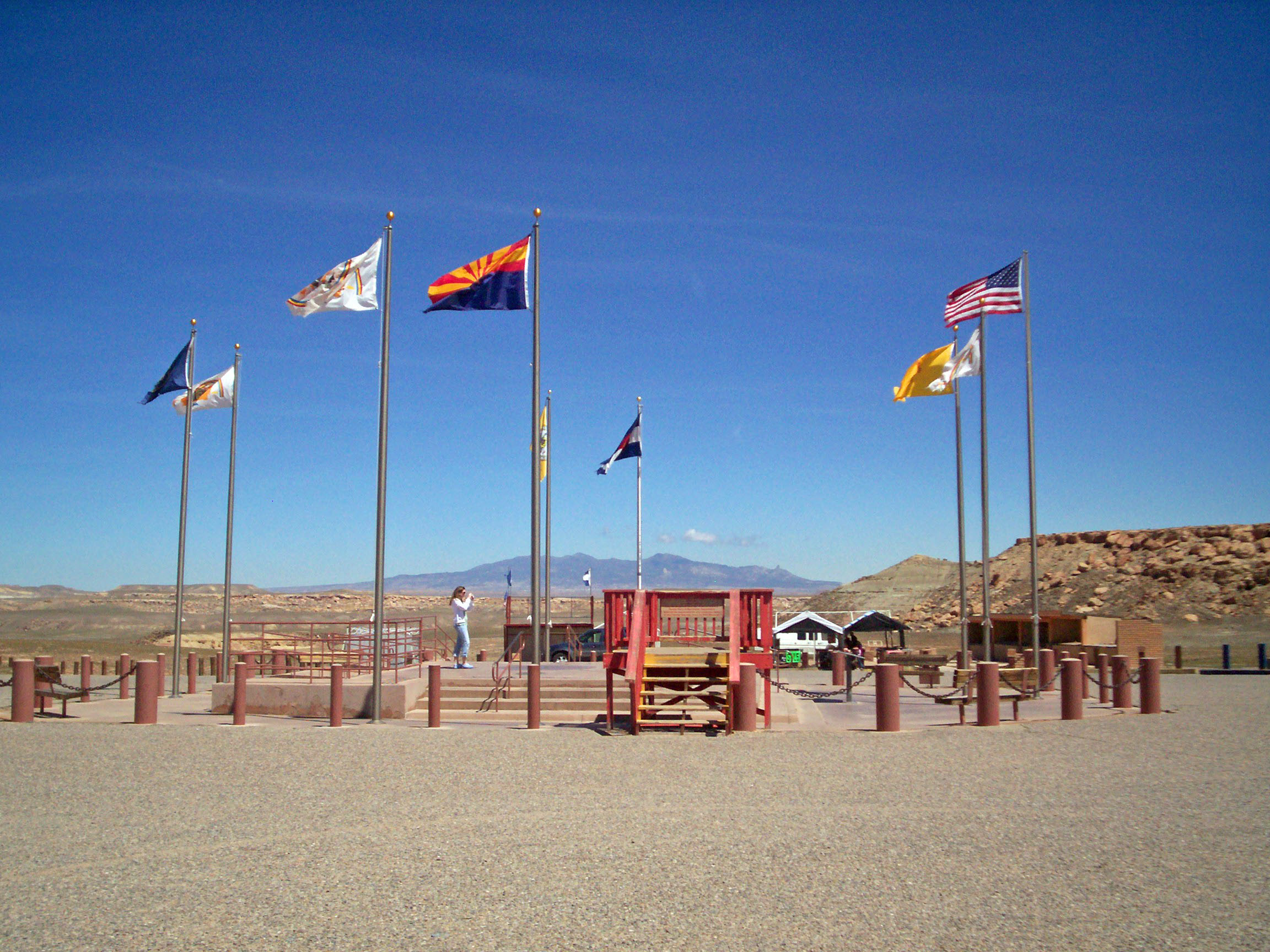
- View of the Four Corners Monument, northeast of Teec Nos Pos.

- Location in Apache County and the state of Arizona

- Location in the United States
- Coordinates: 36°55′19″N 109°04′31″W
- Country: United States
- State: Arizona
- County: Apache

Area
  - Total: 14.30 sq mi (37.04 km^{2})
  - Land: 14.29 sq mi (37.01 km^{2})
  - Water: 0.012 sq mi (0.03 km^{2})
- Elevation: 5,348 ft (1,630 m)

Population (2020)
  - Total: 507
  - Density: 35/sq mi (13.7/km^{2})
- Time zone: UTC-7 (MST)
  - Summer (DST): UTC-6 (MDT)
- ZIP codes: 86514, 86535, 86544
- Area code: 928
- FIPS code: 04-72560
- GNIS feature ID: 2410063

Teec Nos Pos (Navajo: T’iis Názbąs) is a census-designated place (CDP) in Apache County, Arizona, United States. The population was 507 at the 2020 census. It is the western terminus of U.S. Route 64.

== History ==
The community of T’iis Názbąs (Navajo: "Circle of cottonwood trees" or "round tree") was originally located several miles to the south of its present location, and was known as Tisnasbas, and so named officially by the U.S. Geological Survey in 1915.

The population has since moved north to the junction of U.S. Highways 160 and 64. In the 1930s, the Indian Irrigation Service constructed two concrete diversion dams on nearby T'iisnazbas Creek. The dams irrigated approximately 400 acres (1.6 km^{2}) of Navajo farmland. It was renamed Teec Nos Pas in 1960 and Teec Nos Pos in 1983.

Teec Nos Pos is the closest settlement of any size to the Four Corners Monument, which is approximately 7 miles (11 km) to the northeast. A Trading Post was established here in 1897, and as of 2025 is one of the few Navajo trading posts still in operation. The community is the center for Navajo weaving of the Teec Nos Pos patterns.

== Geography ==
According to the United States Census Bureau, the CDP has a total area of 14.3 square miles (37.0 km^{2}), of which 0.012 square miles (0.03 km^{2}), or 0.07%, is water.

=== Climate ===
According to the Köppen Climate Classification system, Teec Nos Pos has a cold desert climate, abbreviated "BWk" on climate maps. The hottest temperature recorded in Teec Nos Pos was 106 °F (41.1 °C) on July 12, 2021, while the coldest temperature recorded was −18 °F (−27.8 °C) on January 3, 1974.

Climate data for Teec Nos Pos, Arizona, 1991–2020 normals, extremes 1962–present
Month	Jan	Feb	Mar	Apr	May	Jun	Jul	Aug	Sep	Oct	Nov	Dec	Year
Record high °F (°C)	66 (19)	74 (23)	82 (28)	98 (37)	99 (37)	105 (41)	106 (41)	103 (39)	100 (38)	98 (37)	79 (26)	66 (19)	106 (41)
Mean maximum °F (°C)	55.7 (13.2)	62.8 (17.1)	73.6 (23.1)	81.7 (27.6)	90.4 (32.4)	98.4 (36.9)	100.9 (38.3)	97.7 (36.5)	92.4 (33.6)	83.8 (28.8)	68.5 (20.3)	57.3 (14.1)	101.3 (38.5)
Mean daily maximum °F (°C)	44.5 (6.9)	51.7 (10.9)	62.2 (16.8)	70.2 (21.2)	79.7 (26.5)	90.9 (32.7)	94.7 (34.8)	91.3 (32.9)	84.3 (29.1)	71.2 (21.8)	57.2 (14.0)	45.1 (7.3)	70.3 (21.2)
Daily mean °F (°C)	34.4 (1.3)	40.3 (4.6)	48.5 (9.2)	56.1 (13.4)	65.0 (18.3)	75.9 (24.4)	80.9 (27.2)	78.0 (25.6)	70.3 (21.3)	57.8 (14.3)	44.8 (7.1)	34.6 (1.4)	57.2 (14.0)
Mean daily minimum °F (°C)	24.4 (−4.2)	28.9 (−1.7)	34.9 (1.6)	41.9 (5.5)	50.4 (10.2)	60.9 (16.1)	67.2 (19.6)	64.7 (18.2)	56.3 (13.5)	44.4 (6.9)	32.4 (0.2)	24.0 (−4.4)	44.2 (6.8)
Mean minimum °F (°C)	8.9 (−12.8)	15.7 (−9.1)	22.0 (−5.6)	28.0 (−2.2)	36.3 (2.4)	47.1 (8.4)	56.4 (13.6)	54.9 (12.7)	42.5 (5.8)	29.3 (−1.5)	17.6 (−8.0)	9.5 (−12.5)	5.5 (−14.7)
Record low °F (°C)	−18 (−28)	−11 (−24)	8 (−13)	17 (−8)	22 (−6)	38 (3)	43 (6)	40 (4)	30 (−1)	14 (−10)	5 (−15)	−14 (−26)	−18 (−28)
Average precipitation inches (mm)	0.94 (24)	0.57 (14)	0.58 (15)	0.58 (15)	0.62 (16)	0.21 (5.3)	0.93 (24)	1.42 (36)	0.78 (20)	0.89 (23)	0.40 (10)	0.42 (11)	8.34 (213.3)
Average snowfall inches (cm)	1.2 (3.0)	1.0 (2.5)	0.3 (0.76)	0.1 (0.25)	0.1 (0.25)	0.0 (0.0)	0.0 (0.0)	0.0 (0.0)	0.0 (0.0)	0.0 (0.0)	0.4 (1.0)	0.9 (2.3)	4.0 (10)
Average precipitation days (≥ 0.01 in)	2.9	2.7	2.6	1.8	2.6	1.2	3.3	3.4	2.7	2.6	1.8	2.0	29.6
Average snowy days (≥ 0.1 in)	0.4	0.3	0.4	0.1	0.0	0.0	0.0	0.0	0.0	0.1	0.2	0.7	2.2
Source 1: NOAA
Source 2: National Weather Service

== Demographics ==
Historical population
Census	Pop.	Note	%±
2000	799		—
2010	730		−8.6%
2020	507		−30.5%
U.S. Decennial Census

As of the census of 2000, there were 799 people, 227 households, and 182 families residing in the CDP. The population density was 56.1 inhabitants per square mile (21.7/km^{2}). There were 317 housing units at an average density of 22.3 units per square mile (8.6 units/km^{2}). The racial makeup of the CDP was 96.5% Native American, 1.0% White, 0.1% from other races, and 2.4% from two or more races. 1.8% of the population were Hispanic or Latino of any race.

There were 227 households, out of which 49.8% had children under the age of 18 living with them, 43.2% were married couples living together, 30.8% had a female householder with no husband present, and 19.8% were non-families. 16.7% of all households were made up of individuals, and 5.7% had someone living alone who was 65 years of age or older. The average household size was 3.52 and the average family size was 4.02.

In the CDP, the age distribution of the population shows 41.3% under the age of 18, 8.9% from 18 to 24, 25.9% from 25 to 44, 18.1% from 45 to 64, and 5.8% who were 65 years of age or older. The median age was 25 years. For every 100 females, there were 92.5 males. For every 100 females age 18 and over, there were 86.9 males.

The median income for a household in the CDP was $17,188, and the median income for a family was $27,083. Males had a median income of $21,023 versus $14,464 for females. The per capita income for the CDP was $6,229. About 41.5% of families and 43.8% of the population were below the poverty line, including 46.6% of those under age 18 and 78.9% of those age 65 or over.

== Government and infrastructure ==
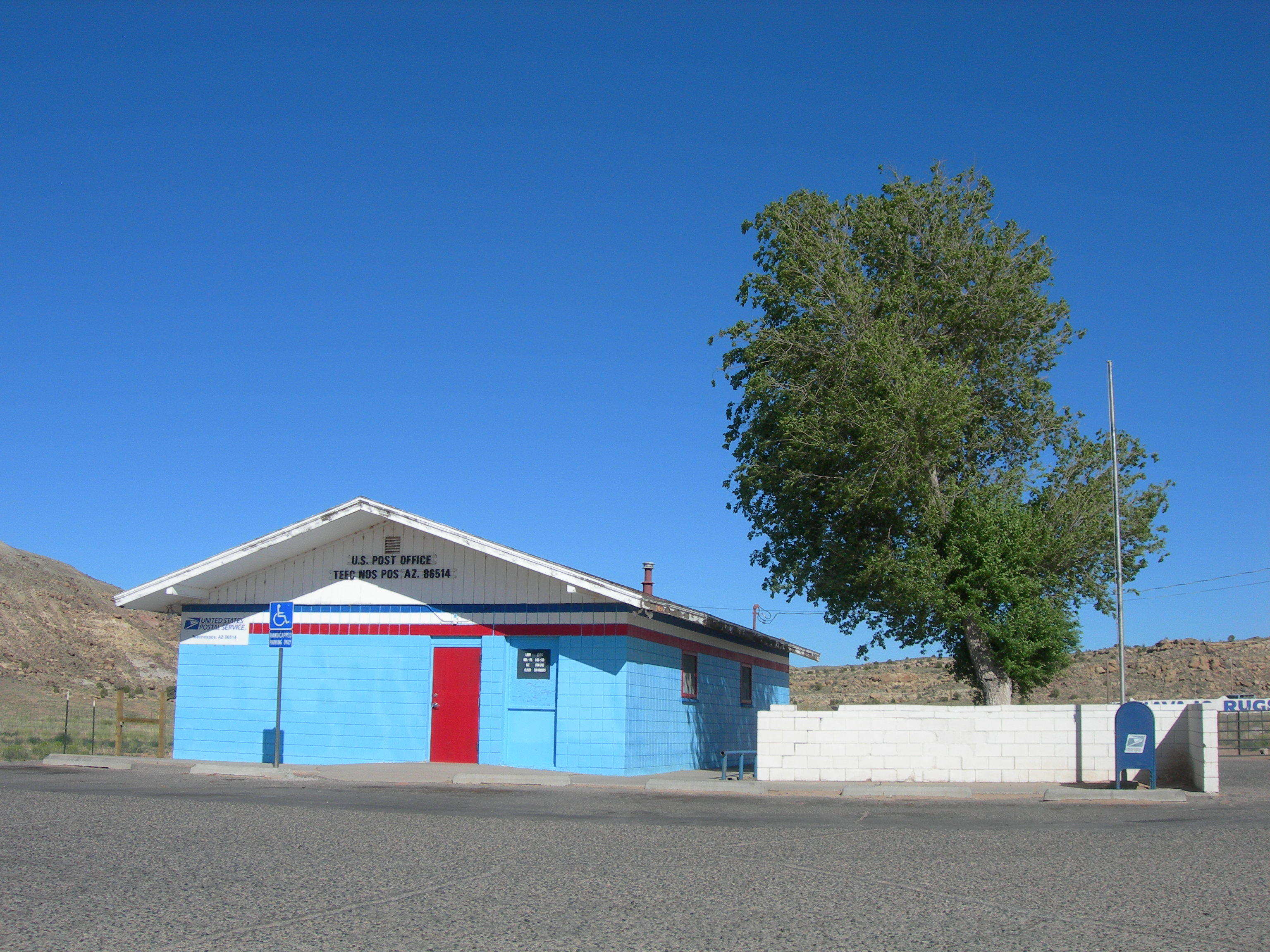
Teec Nos Pos Post Office

The United States Postal Service operates the Teec Nos Pos Post Office.

== Education ==
The area is a part of the Red Mesa Unified School District. The city is served by Red Mesa K-8 School and Red Mesa High School.

Originally the territory was within the Chinle School District. In July 1983 the Red Mesa Unified School District formed, splitting from the Chinle School District.

The Bureau of Indian Education (BIE) operates the T'iis Nazbas Community School, a K-8 school, in Teec Nos Pos. A building for the Teec Nos Pos Boarding School was dedicated in 1962. In 1962 the school had 353 students. In 1963 there were plans to build 17 additional classrooms as well as a cafeteria, two dormitories, and a multipurpose room, and housing for employees. The capacity, after the additions, would be over 1,000. In 1991 the Teec Nos Pos school facility lacked fire alarms and other fire protection systems.

== See also ==
- List of census-designated places in Arizona
