= Cibola White Ware =

Ceramic tradition in southwestern US

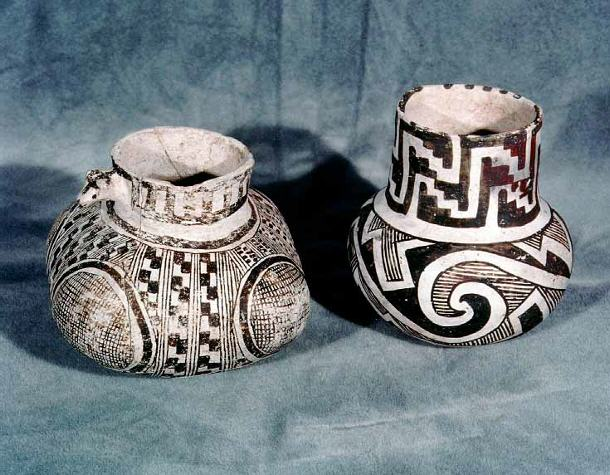
Cibola whiteware pots, Roosevelt Lake area, Arizona

Cibola White Ware is a ceramic tradition of Arizona and New Mexico, dating from 1225–1325 CE.

== History ==
The ware was produced roughly from the San Juan River south to the upper Gila River drainage, and from the White Mountains east to the Laguna Pueblo area (Goetze and Mills 1993:21) and probably east into the Rio Grande drainage. Cibola White Ware shares its basic style (black designs painted on a white or light gray background) with a number of other regional wares, all produced by prehistoric Puebloan peoples. The various wares often shared stylistic ideas, and archaeologists make the various fine distinctions primarily to aid them in dating archaeological deposits and in tracing out prehistoric trade.

== Classification ==
Most Cibola White Ware is distinguished from most other black-on-white wares by the use of crushed sherd temper in the preparation of clay for firing, along with the use of mineral-based black paint. If sherd temper is combined with black plant-based paint, the pottery is instead classified as Little Colorado White Ware (produced in the Little Colorado River drainage), with one exception, Chaco-McElmo Black-on-white. Also, some early Cibola White Ware vessels have mixed sand and sherd temper or all sand temper. The following table may help the reader understand where archaeologists have drawn the lines between one prehistoric ware and the next (see Goetze and Mills 1993:27–29 for further assistance).

Temper Type	Mineral Paint	Carbon Paint
Sherd temper	Most Cibola White Ware	Little Colorado White Ware (usually)
Quartz sand temper	Some early Cibola White Ware	Tusayan White Ware
