= Four Corners Monument =

National monument in the Southwestern U.S.

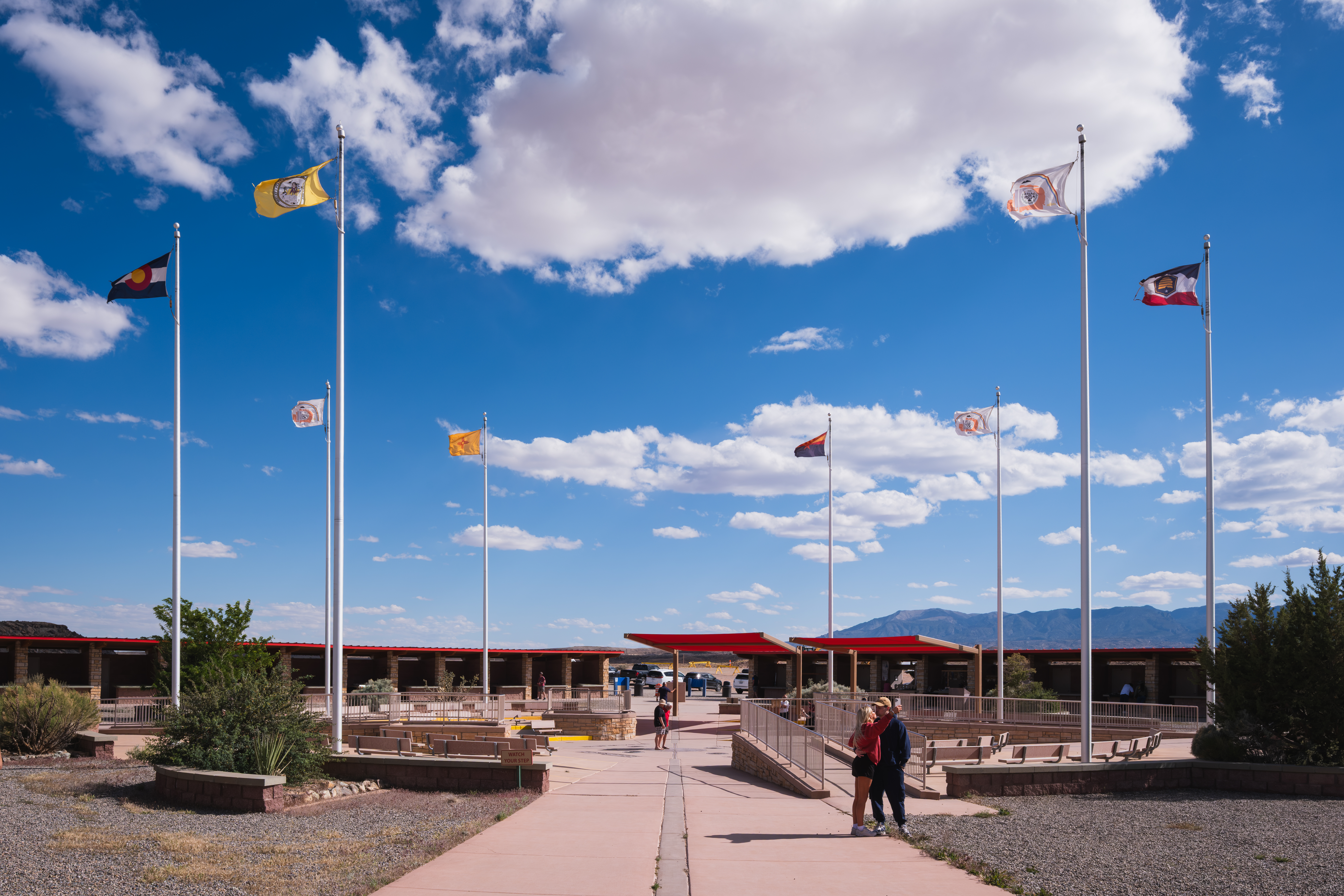
- Four Corners Monument in 2026
- Interactive map of Four Corners Monument
- Location: The quadripoint in the Southwestern United States where the states of Arizona, Colorado, New Mexico, and Utah meet
- Coordinates: 36.99898°N 109.04517°W
- Designer: Navajo Nation; Bureau of Land Management
- Type: Megalithic
- Material: Granite and brass
- Beginning date: 1868
- Completion date: 1912
- Opening date: 1931
- Website: Official website
- "Here meet in freedom under God four states"

The Four Corners Monument marks the quadripoint in the Southwestern United States where the states of Arizona, Colorado, New Mexico, and Utah meet. It is the only point in the United States shared by four states, leading to the area being named the Four Corners region. The monument also marks the boundary between two sovereign Native American governments, the Navajo Nation, which maintains the monument as a tourist attraction, and the Ute Mountain Ute Tribe Reservation.

The origins of the state boundaries marked by the monument occurred just prior to, and during, the American Civil War, when the United States Congress acted to form governments in the area to combat the spread of slavery to the region. When the early territories were formed, their boundaries were designated along meridian and parallel lines. Beginning in the 1860s, these lines were surveyed and marked. These early surveys included some errors, but even so, the markers placed became the legal boundaries, superseding the written descriptions of geographical meridians and parallels. This includes the Four Corners Monument, which has been legally established as the corner of the four states.

== Monument ==
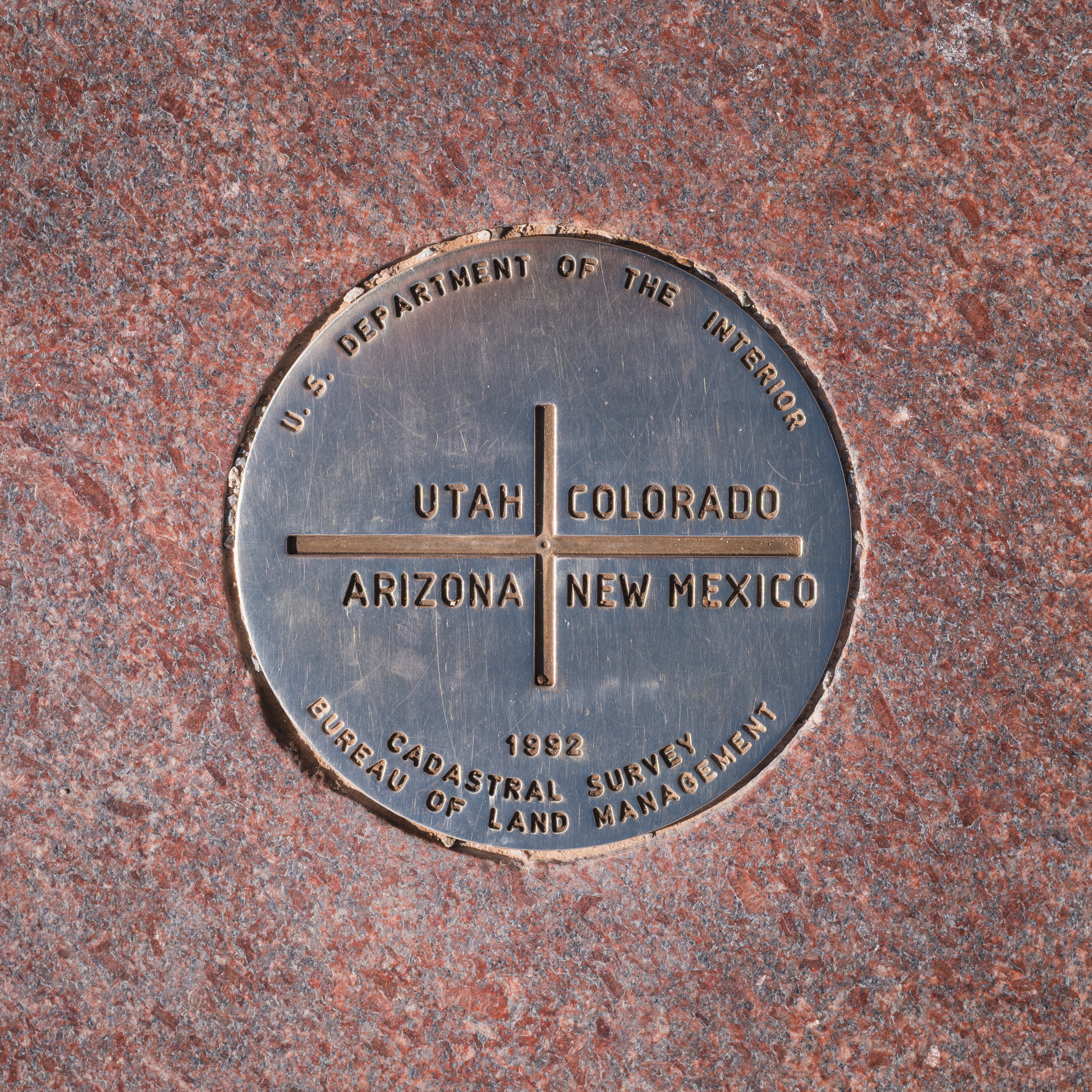
The current marker at the exact Four Corners point, placed in 1992

The monument is maintained as a tourist attraction by the Navajo Nation Parks and Recreation Department, Four Corners Monument Navajo Tribal Park. It is an example of a political boundary that is a tourist destination in its own right. The monument consists of a granite disk embedded with a smaller bronze disk around the point, surrounded by smaller, appropriately located state seals and flags representing both the states and tribal nations of the area. Circling the point, starting from Colorado, the disk reads with two words in each state "Here meet in freedom under God four states". Around the monument, local Navajo and Ute artisans sell souvenirs and food. An admission fee is required to view and photograph the monument. The monument is a popular tourist attraction despite its remote and isolated location. People travel long distances to take pictures of family and friends at the monument in Twister-like poses, sitting on the disk, in a circle of friends or family around the disk, or for couples to kiss directly over the disk.

== Location ==
The monument is located on the Colorado Plateau west of U.S. Highway 160, on State Road 597, approximately 40 miles (64 km) southwest of Cortez, Colorado. In addition to the four states, two semi-autonomous American Indian tribal governments have boundaries at the monument, the Navajo Nation and the Ute Mountain Ute Tribe Reservation, with the Ute Mountain tribal boundaries coinciding with Colorado's boundaries at the monument.

== Climate ==
Located in the Colorado Plateau region of the Southwestern United States, the Four Corners Monument has a strong cold semi-arid climate (BSk) according to the Köppen climate classification system. Winters are cold but sunny, while summers are hot and dry. The record high temperature of 105 °F (41 °C) has been observed five times, on June 19, 29 and 30, 1974, July 14, 2003, and July 21, 2005. The record low temperature of −18 °F (−28 °C) was observed on January 3, 1974.

Climate data for Four Corners National Monument (Arizona, Colorado, New Mexico, Utah)
Month	Jan	Feb	Mar	Apr	May	Jun	Jul	Aug	Sep	Oct	Nov	Dec	Year
Record high °F (°C)	69 (21)	73 (23)	82 (28)	102 (39)	99 (37)	105 (41)	105 (41)	103 (39)	97 (36)	98 (37)	79 (26)	79 (26)	105 (41)
Mean daily maximum °F (°C)	42 (6)	50 (10)	58 (14)	68 (20)	78 (26)	89 (32)	93 (34)	90 (32)	82 (28)	69 (21)	54 (12)	43 (6)	68 (20)
Mean daily minimum °F (°C)	20 (−7)	26 (−3)	33 (1)	39 (4)	48 (9)	58 (14)	64 (18)	62 (17)	54 (12)	41 (5)	30 (−1)	22 (−6)	41 (5)
Record low °F (°C)	−18 (−28)	−11 (−24)	8 (−13)	17 (−8)	27 (−3)	38 (3)	44 (7)	40 (4)	23 (−5)	21 (−6)	5 (−15)	−14 (−26)	−18 (−28)
Average precipitation inches (mm)	0.73 (19)	0.43 (11)	0.65 (17)	0.44 (11)	0.62 (16)	0.24 (6.1)	0.96 (24)	1.12 (28)	0.72 (18)	1.01 (26)	0.59 (15)	0.57 (14)	8.08 (205.1)
Average snowfall inches (cm)	3.4 (8.6)	3.6 (9.1)	1.4 (3.6)	0.2 (0.51)	0 (0)	0 (0)	0 (0)	0 (0)	0 (0)	0.3 (0.76)	0.9 (2.3)	3.2 (8.1)	13 (32.97)
Source 1:
Source 2:

== History ==
History of the borders

The evolution of the borders that make up Four Corners, beginning in 1850. The monument is marked by the yellow dot, with modern state boundaries underlaid for reference.

The borders that make up Four Corners, along with the year each border was officially surveyed and marked. The markers left in the original survey are today's current borders, and supersede any earlier written descriptions.

The area now called Four Corners was initially American Indian land, and beginning in the 16th century it was claimed by Spain as part of New Spain. After Mexico gained independence from Spain in 1821, the area was governed by Mexico until being ceded to the United States by the Treaty of Guadalupe Hidalgo in 1848, following the United States' victory in the Mexican–American War. The first boundary which would become part of the monument was set as part of the Compromise of 1850, which created the New Mexico Territory and Utah Territory. The border between the two territories was congressionally defined as the 37th parallel north by the 31st United States Congress. In 1861, the 36th United States Congress transferred land previously allocated to the Utah Territory to the newly created Colorado Territory. The Colorado Territory's southern border would remain as the 37th parallel north, but a new border—between the Colorado and Utah Territories—was declared to be the 32nd meridian west from Washington. This line was derived from the reference used at the time, the Washington meridian.

In 1860, just prior to the outbreak of the American Civil War, a group of people in the southern portion of New Mexico Territory passed a resolution condemning the United States for creating such a vast territory with only a single, small government in place at Santa Fe. They claimed that by doing so, the U.S. had ignored the needs of the southern portion, left it without a functional system of law and order, and allowed the situation to deteriorate into a state of chaos and near-anarchy. The group declared secession from the United States and announced their intent to join the Confederate States of America under the name of the Arizona Territory. The U.S. Congress responded in 1863 by creating another Arizona Territory with different but partially overlapping boundaries. The Confederate boundaries split New Mexico along an east–west line, the 34th parallel north, allowing for a single state connection from Texas to the Colorado River. This would give the Confederacy access to California and the Pacific coast. The Union definition split New Mexico along a north-south line, the 32nd meridian west from Washington, which simply extended the boundary between Colorado and Utah southward. The Union plan eventually became reality, and this created the quadripoint at the modern Four Corners. After the split, New Mexico resembled its modern form, with only slight differences.

=== Surveying the boundaries ===
After the Civil War, efforts began to survey and mark the actual borders. In 1868, the United States General Land Office (GLO) had Ehud N. Darling survey and set markers along the border between the Colorado and New Mexico Territories (the 37th parallel north); this border over time has become known as the "Darling Line". In 1875, another GLO surveyor, Chandler Robbins, surveyed and marked the border between the Arizona and New Mexico Territories (the 32nd meridian west of Washington). Robbins began near the Mexico–United States border and worked his way north, marking the border every so often. Near the 37th parallel north, he intersected the Darling Line, and here he erected a sandstone shaft. This sandstone shaft marked today's location of the Four Corners Monument.

In 1878, Rollin J. Reeves surveyed and marked the border between the newly created State of Colorado and the Utah Territory. Reeves located the sandstone shaft marker placed by Robbins at today's Four Corners Monument. He then began to survey and mark the border between Colorado and Utah from this point northward. In 1901, Howard B. Carpenter surveyed and marked the border between Arizona and Utah, completing the survey of borders making up the Four Corners Monument.

The results of these surveys and the markers placed were later accepted as the legal boundaries between the various states.

=== Development into a monument ===
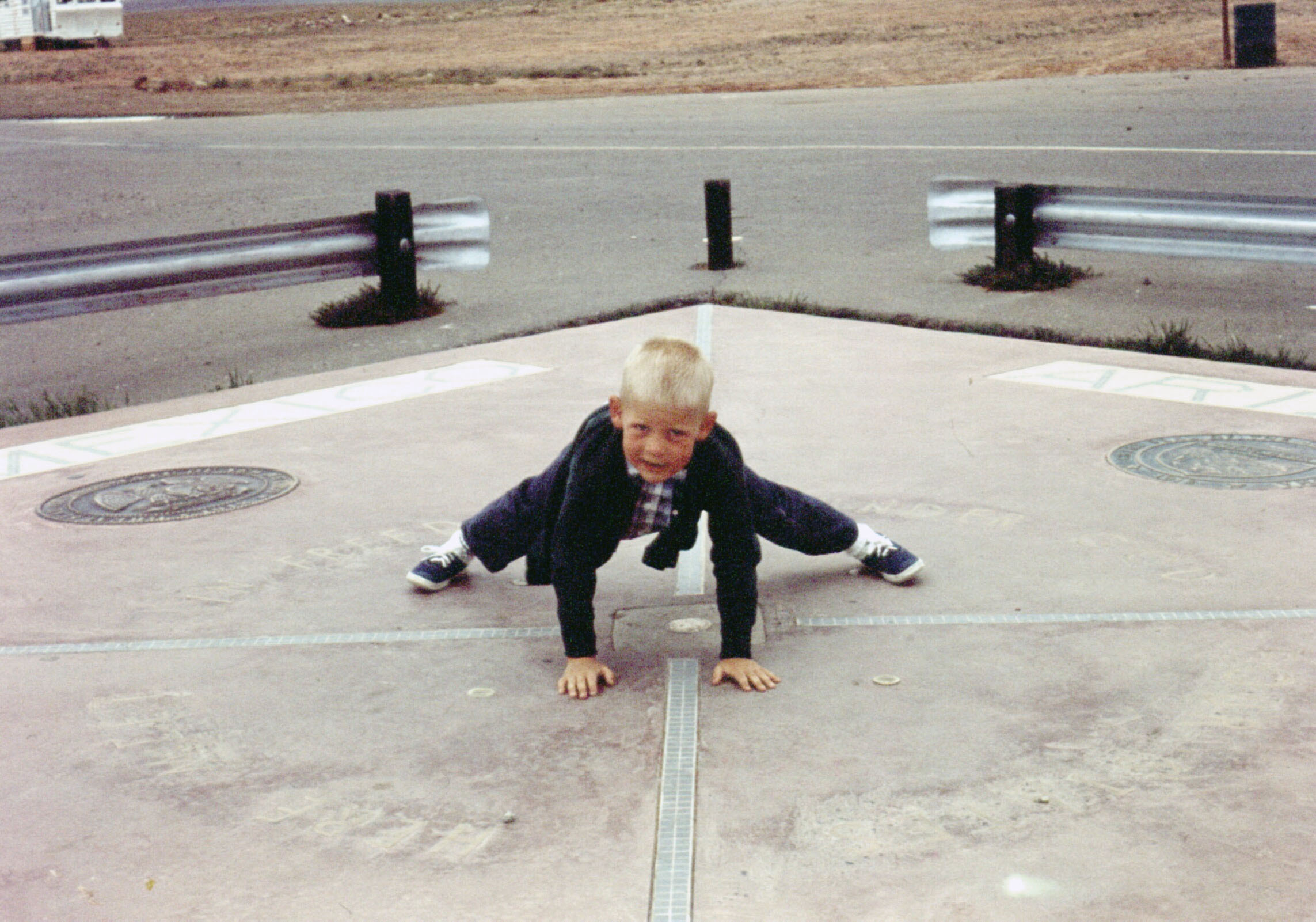
A child straddling all four states, on the monument as it looked following the 1962 reconstruction.

By 1899, the sandstone shaft marker placed by Chandler Robbins in 1875 had been disturbed and broken, so it was replaced with a new stone by two U.S. surveyors, Hubert D. Page and James M. Lentz. In 1912, a simple concrete pad was poured around the marker. The first modern Navajo government convened in 1923 in an effort to organize and regulate an increasing amount of oil exploration activities on Navajo lands, and they played a significant role in the monument's further development. In 1931, Everett H. Kimmell, another U.S. surveyor, found this newer stone had been broken too, and he replaced it with a brass disc marker set in concrete. In 1962, the Bureau of Land Management and the Bureau of Indian Affairs poured an elevated concrete pad around the 1931 brass marker; this pad included the state border lines and names in tile. The monument was rebuilt in 1992, and the 1931 brass marker was replaced with a disc-shaped aluminum-bronze plate set in granite. The monument was again rebuilt in 2010, although the disc-shaped plate from 1992 remained in place.

=== Misplacement controversy ===
Since the early 20th century, controversies have arisen regarding the accuracy of the monument's placement. After the initial surveys, it was found that the borders did not always follow the lines of meridian and parallel (as had been intended) due to the primitive surveying technology available at the time. This discrepancy left the four states asking if the correct borders were the exact lines of meridian and parallel (and if new, more accurate, surveys needed to be done), or if the markers placed during the initial surveys were now the actual border.

New Mexico sued Colorado in 1919, and when the Supreme Court in 1925 ruled that the markers placed during the initial surveys were the actual borders, even if the markers were off in some locations (including the Four Corners Monument and the Preston Monument to the east), the issue was resolved. Today's legal description of these border lines is based on the original markers, and not the written description of the borders created when the territories were formed. Because of this, the borders between these states are not perfectly straight and often zigzag.

One example is the border between Colorado and Utah, where in one area the border jogs west about 1.5 miles (2.4 km) from where it was intended to be placed by the written description (i.e. the 32nd meridian west from Washington – 38°16′34″N 109°03′38″W). Because of the Supreme Court decision, the border set out by the markers remains the border between the two states.

This issue resurfaced briefly in 2009 with U.S. media reports that the monument was placed 2.5 miles (4.0 km) west of its intended location. This was soon found to be the result of a mistaken assumption: that the Prime Meridian, used in the United States since 1912, was used. In actuality, the 19th century surveys used the previous Washington meridian. A spokesperson for the U.S. National Geodetic Survey (USNGS) has stated that the USNGS has determined that the modern monument is located roughly 1,800 feet (550 m) east of where the Four Corners marker had originally been intended to be located by the US Congress in 1863. The spokesperson, however, reiterated that the 1875 survey was accepted by all states and therefore its markers, including the Four Corners Monument, are legally binding. Similar statements were issued by the Navajo Nation, defending their work in maintaining and promoting the monument.

== See also ==
- Four Corners
- Navajo Nation
  - Navajo Indian Reservation
- Ute Mountain Ute Tribe
  - Ute Mountain Ute Indian Reservation
- 37th parallel north – Congressionally defined border running east–west through the monument
- 32nd meridian west from Washington – Congressionally defined border running north–south through the monument
- New Mexico State Road 597 – Highway used to access the monument
- Cornered (Breaking Bad) – Episode of the television series Breaking Bad that features the monument

=== Similar places ===
- Cameron's Corner
- Canadian four corners
- No Man's Heath
- Tres Fronteras
- Triple Frontier
- Three-Country Cairn
- Vaalserberg
