= Red Valley/Cove High School =

Secondary school in Apache County, Arizona

Coordinates: 36°34′34″N 109°03′29″W

Location
- North Route 13, milepost 22; Red Valley, Arizona 86544; United States

Information
- School type: Public high school
- Established: 2006 (20 years ago)
- School district: Red Mesa Unified School District
- CEEB code: 030595
- Grades: 9-12
- Enrollment: 13 (2023-2024)
- Colors: Black and red
- Mascot: Miners
- Website: rvchs.rmusd.net

Red Valley/Cove High School is a high school in the community of Red Valley, Arizona, also serving Cove, Arizona. It is operated by the Red Mesa Unified School District. It was created to allow students in the Red Valley and Cove area to attend high school within Arizona; prior to Red Valley/Cove's opening, these areas were served by schools in New Mexico.

The school, with a campus built in 2006, opened in 2007 with 27 students; 3 of them graduated that year. As of 2015 the employees include five teachers, seven classified staff members, a principal, and two bus drivers. The school is about 11 miles (18 km) northeast of Lukachukai, Arizona and 22 miles (35 km) southwest of Shiprock, New Mexico. The campus is in proximity to the Arizona-New Mexico state line. The sports team is the "Miners".

The school became a member of the Arizona Interscholastic Association in the 2013–14 school year.
