= Red Mesa Unified School District =

School district in Red Mesa, Apache County, Arizona

Red Mesa Unified School District #27 is a public school district headquartered in Red Mesa, unincorporated Apache County, Arizona, near Teec Nos Pos on the Navajo Nation. It has a five-member elected school board, who oversee operations of schools that are regulated by state standards.

The district includes Red Mesa, Dennehotso, Red Rock, Rock Point, Teec Nos Pos, and most of Round Rock.

== History ==
Originally the territory was within the Chinle Unified School District. The Red Mesa elementary school and the Red Mesa Junior High School were constructed in the 1970s. In July 1983 the Red Mesa Unified School District formed, splitting from the Chinle School District.

== Demographics ==
As of 2020 the district has about 720 students.

== Schools ==
All schools are located in unincorporated areas.

- Red Mesa High School - Red Mesa
- Red Mesa Junior High School (RMJHS) - Red Mesa
  - In 1972 the brick building was completed. Thomas Brady, a medicine man from Sweetwater, dedicated the building.
- Red Mesa Elementary School (RMES) - Red Mesa
  - In 1967 the ground was prepared for construction of the school, which began in 1970. Originally its attendance boundary included Red Mesa, Baby Rocks, Dennehotso, Mexican Water, Sweetwater, and Teec Nos Pos in Arizona.
- Round Rock K-8
  - Located off Arizona State Highway 191
- Red Valley/Cove High School (2005), serving the Red Valley area

== Other facilities ==
In the main RMUSD complex, the RMUSD administration building opened in 1988. The parent education center opened in 1996. The staff development center opened in 1998. The Music Art Preschool (MAP) building opened in 1999.
