= Ganado =

Ganado may refer to:

- Ganado, Arizona
  - Ganado Airport
- Ganado, Texas
- Ganado High School (disambiguation)
- Ganado Independent School District, Texas
- Ganado Unified School District, Arizona
- Albert Ganado (1924–2025), Maltese lawyer and historian
- Herbert Ganado (1906–1979), Maltese writer and politician
- Maria Grech Ganado (born 1943), Maltese author and academic

== See also ==
- Ganado bravo, a term for a Spanish Fighting Bull
- Ganados, enemy characters from Resident Evil 4
- Gazini Ganados (born 1995), Filipino-Palestinian fashion model and beauty pageant titleholder
