= Klagetoh, Arizona =

CDP in Apache County, Arizona

Klagetoh, Arizona Łeeyiʼtó (Navajo)
- Census-designated place
- Location within Arizona Location within the United States
- Coordinates: 35°30′03″N 109°31′41″W
- Country: United States
- State: Arizona
- County: Apache

Area
  - Total: 0.34 sq mi (0.87 km^{2})
  - Land: 0.34 sq mi (0.87 km^{2})
  - Water: 0 sq mi (0.00 km^{2})
- Elevation: 6,437 ft (1,962 m)

Population (2020)
  - Total: 181
  - Density: 540.6/sq mi (208.72/km^{2})
- Time zone: UTC-7 (MST)
  - Summer (DST): UTC-6 (MDT)
- ZIP code: 86505
- Area code: 928
- FIPS code: 04-38250
- GNIS feature ID: 2582807

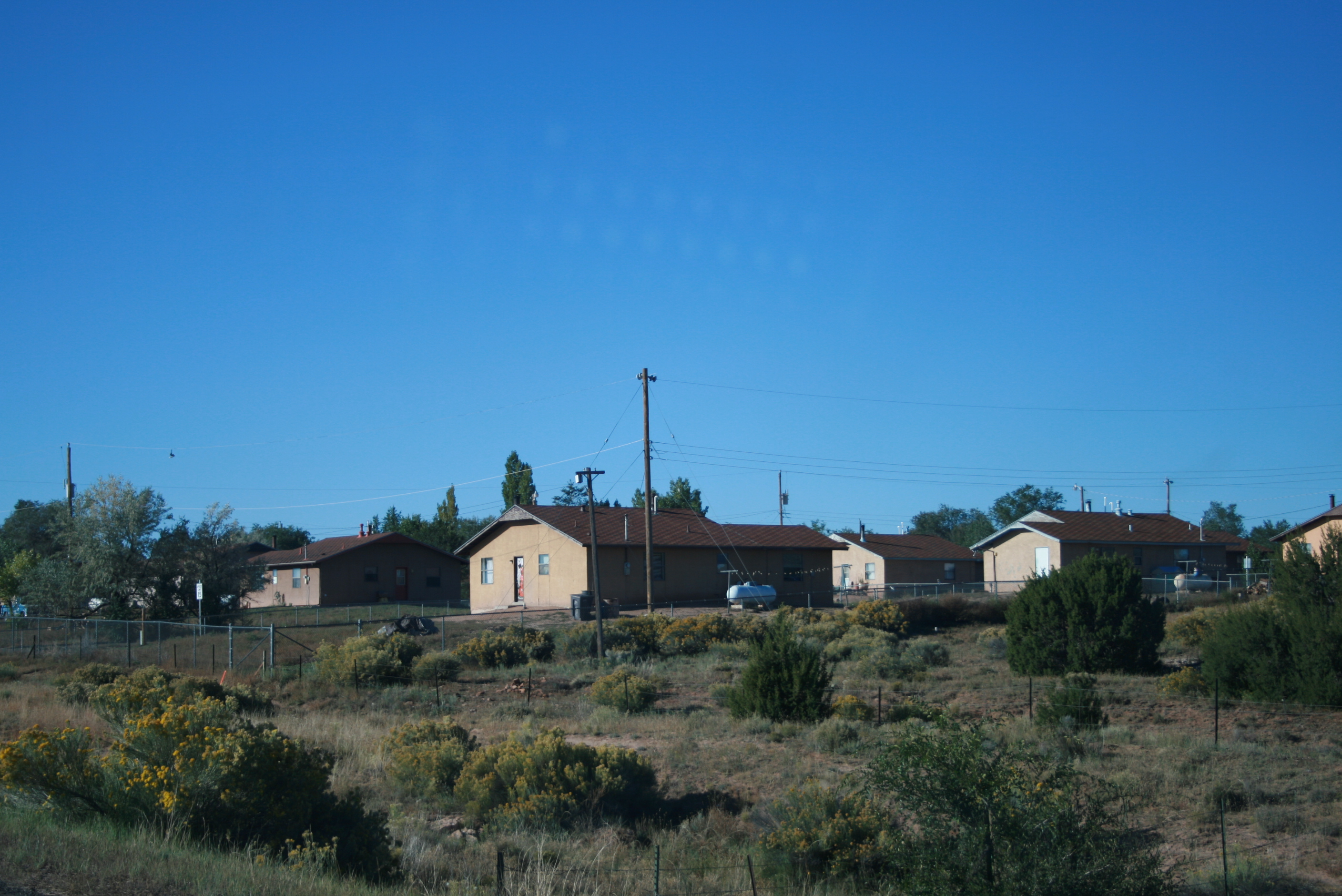

Klagetoh (Navajo: Łeeyiʼtó) is a census-designated place (CDP) in Apache County, Arizona, United States. The population was 242 at the 2010 census.

== History ==
Missionaries transcribed “Łeeyi’ tó” as Klagetoh. “Łeeyi’ tó” translates as underground water which is now an abandoned well. It was the first well to be developed and used by the community. The abandoned well is located approximately 1/8 mi (0.20 km) east of the Red Mesa Store.

The people who pioneered Klagetoh itself are not remembered, at least by name. The Anasazi had a thriving settlement here once, perhaps with almost as many residents as the 6,000-person chapter boasts today.

== Rug ==
Navajo rugs from the Klagetoh area are among the most popular because of their bold clear cut designs. The Klagetoh weaving is distinguished by strong central design motifs, complex bordering, and a combination of grey, black, white, and red yarns. It is very similar to the Ganado rugs, but with a predominantly gray background instead of the Ganado's red.

== Music ==
Klagetoh is home to the Klagetoh Maiden Singers and Klagetoh Swingers. The Klagetoh Maiden Singers are Joycetta Bonnie, Rose M. Bonnie, Winnie Bonnie, Marie E. Brown, and Bertha Johnson. The Klagetoh Swingers are Ted B. Bonnie, Ned Tsosie Clark, Frank J. Begay, Dan George, Robert P. Roan, Arthur P. Roan, Bennie Silversmith, and Johnny Dealison.

== Major clans ==
Tódich'iinii, Áshįįhí, Tsi'najinii, Tsénjikiinii, Tabaaha, Bitahnnii, Totsonii. Many Klagetoh residents have both Tsin'najinii and Tsenjikiinii in their lineage.

== Notable people ==
- Annie Dodge Wauneka (1910–1997) – member of the Navajo Nation Council.
- Albert A. Hale (1950–2021) – attorney and Democratic politician.
- Albert Tom – member of the Arizona House of Representatives from 2005 through 2009.

== Geography ==
Klagetoh is located along U.S. Route 191, approximately 14 miles (23 km) south of Ganado and 23 miles (37 km) north of Chambers.

According to the United States Census Bureau, the CDP has a total area of 0.34 square miles (0.87 km^{2}), all land.

=== Climate ===
According to the Köppen Climate Classification system, Klagetoh has a semi-arid climate, abbreviated "BSk" on climate maps. Temperatures range from an average maximum temperature in the low to mid-90s Fahrenheit (°F) during the summer months (June–August) to an average minimum temperature in the high teens to low 20s during winter months (December–January). Total average annual precipitation in the vicinity of the study area is about 6.5 inches (170 mm), with the majority typically occurring during July, August, and September. The total average annual snowfall is a little over 5 inches (130 mm), with the majority typically occurring during December (Western Regional Climate Center [WRCC] 2011).

== Education ==
It is in the Ganado Unified School District, which operates Ganado High School.

== Demographics ==
Historical population
Census	Pop.	Note	%±
2010	242		—
2020	181		−25.2%
U.S. Decennial Census
