= Cornfields, Arizona =

CDP in Apache County, Arizona

Cornfields, Arizona K’iiltsoiitah (Navajo)
- Census-designated place
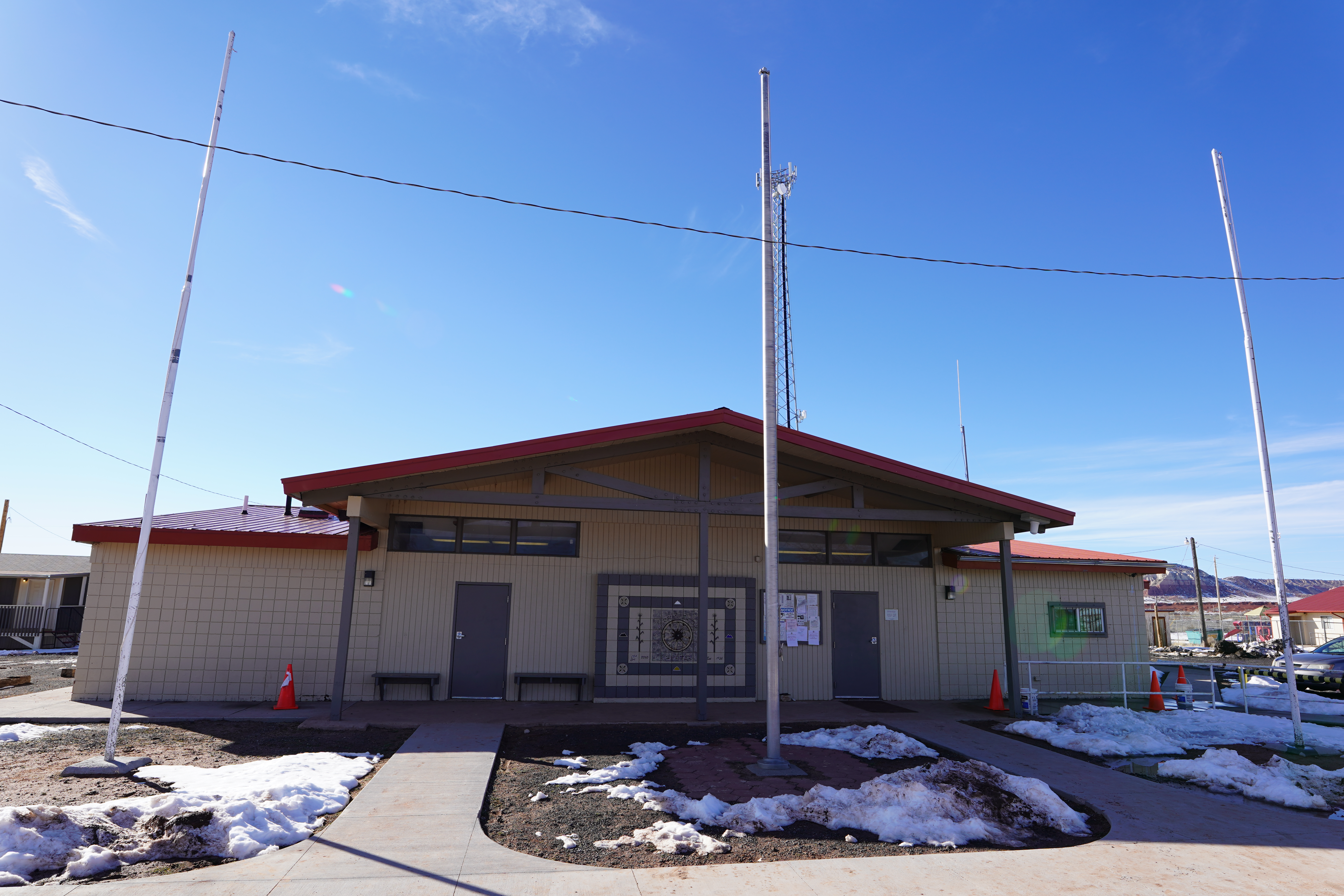
- Cornfields Chapter House

- Location within Arizona
- Coordinates: 35°39′05″N 109°40′32″W
- Country: United States
- State: Arizona
- County: Apache

Area
  - Total: 0.37 sq mi (0.97 km^{2})
  - Land: 0.37 sq mi (0.97 km^{2})
  - Water: 0 sq mi (0.00 km^{2})
- Elevation: 6,152 ft (1,875 m)

Population (2020)
  - Total: 221
  - Density: 589.3/sq mi (227.52/km^{2})
- Time zone: UTC-7 (MST)
  - Summer (DST): UTC-6 (MDT)
- ZIP code: 86505
- Area code: 928
- FIPS code: 04-15850
- GNIS feature ID: 2582763

Cornfields (Navajo: K’iiltsoiitah) is a chapter of the Navajo Nation and a census-designated place (CDP) in Apache County, Arizona, United States. The population was 255 at the 2010 census.

Cornfields is part of the Fort Defiance Agency, of the Bureau of Indian Affairs; Ganado, AZ is the delegate seat for the district that encompasses the Jeddito, Cornfields, Ganado, Kinlichee, Steamboat communities at the Navajo Nation Council.

== Geography ==
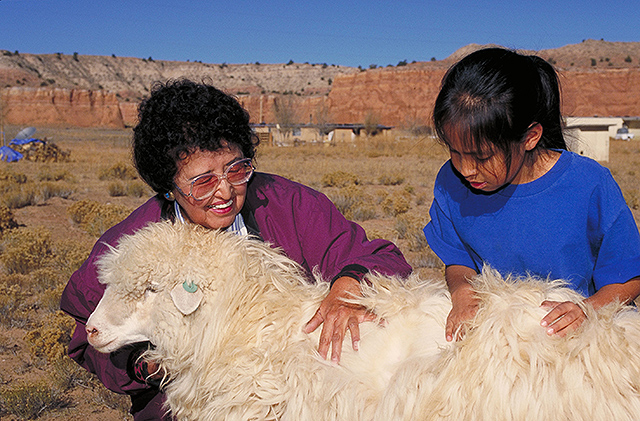
A Navajo woman shows the long, dense wool of a Navajo-Churro ewe to a Navajo girl.

Cornfields is located about 10 miles (16 km) southwest of Burnside.

According to the United States Census Bureau, the CDP has a total area of 0.39 square miles (1.0 km^{2}), all land. Cornfields is part of the greater Ganado area which includes Ganado, Burnside, Cornfields, Kinlichee, Wood Springs, Klagetoh, and Steamboat and the family ranches dispersed amongst these sub-areas.

== Education ==
It is in the Ganado Unified School District, which operates Ganado High School.

== Demographics ==
Historical population
Census	Pop.	Note	%±
2020	221		—
U.S. Decennial Census
