= Kinlichee Creek =

Stream in Apache County, Arizona

Coordinates: 35°44′23″N 109°29′41″W

Location
- Country: United States
- State: Arizona
- County: Apache

Physical characteristics
- Mouth
  - elevation: 6,463 ft (1,970 m)

Kinlichee Creek, also known as Ganado Wash and Kin(-)Li(-)Chee Creek, is a stream in the U.S. state of Arizona. It is located northeast of the census-designated place of Ganado in Apache County.

The head of Kinlichee Creek is located 7.5 miles (12.1 km) west of Fort Defiance, Arizona. It flows to the southwest 3.5 miles (5.6 km) and then west-northwest through Bear Canyon. It then joins Lone Tule Wash at the head of Pueblo Colorado Wash, which is 3.3 miles (5.3 km) northeast of Ganado.
