= Ganado High School =

Ganado High School may refer to two high schools in the United States:

- Ganado High School (Arizona): Ganado, Arizona
- Ganado High School (Texas): Ganado, Texas
