= Steamboat, Arizona =

CDP in Apache County, Arizona

Steamboat, Arizona Hóyééʼ (Navajo)
- Census-designated place
- Location in Apache County and the state of Arizona

- Location in the United States
- Coordinates: 35°44′52″N 109°51′18″W
- Country: United States
- State: Arizona
- County: Apache

Area
  - Total: 2.43 sq mi (6.29 km^{2})
  - Land: 2.43 sq mi (6.29 km^{2})
  - Water: 0 sq mi (0.00 km^{2})
- Elevation: 6,470 ft (1,970 m)

Population (2020)
  - Total: 235
  - Density: 96.8/sq mi (37.36/km^{2})
- Time zone: UTC-7 (MST)
- ZIP code: 86505
- Area code: 928
- FIPS code: 04-69585
- GNIS feature ID: 2409999

Steamboat (Navajo: Hóyééʼ) is a census-designated place (CDP) in Apache County, Arizona, United States, that includes Steamboat Canyon and Steamboat Trading Post. The population was 284 at the 2010 census.

== Geography ==
Steamboat is located in northeastern Arizona on the Colorado Plateau. Natural resources on the Colorado Plateau include coal, uranium, petroleum, and natural gas. Steamboat is located along Arizona State Route 264.

According to the United States Census Bureau, the CDP has a total area of 2.4 square miles (6.2 km^{2}), all land.

== Demographics ==
Historical population
Census	Pop.	Note	%±
2000	233		—
2010	284		21.9%
2020	235		−17.3%
U.S. Decennial Census

As of the census of 2000, there were 233 people, 56 households, and 50 families living in the CDP. The population density was 98.8 inhabitants per square mile (38.1/km^{2}). There were 92 housing units at an average density of 39.0 per square mile (15.1/km^{2}). The racial makeup of the CDP was 97% Native American, <1% from other races, and 2% from two or more races. 2% of the population were Hispanic or Latino of any race.

There were 56 households, out of which 55% had children under the age of 18 living with them, 50% were married couples living together, 32% had a female householder with no husband present, and 11% were non-families. 11% of all households were made up of individuals, and 4% had someone living alone who was 65 years of age or older. The average household size was 4.2 and the average family size was 4.5.

In the CDP, the age distribution of the population shows 40% under the age of 18, 13% from 18 to 24, 28% from 25 to 44, 17% from 45 to 64, and 3% who were 65 years of age or older. The median age was 23 years. For every 100 females, there were 118 males. For every 100 females age 18 and over, there were 106 males.

The median income for a household in the CDP was $9,276, and the median income for a family was $9,276. Males had a median income of $0 versus $0 for females. The per capita income for the CDP was $3,767. About 83% of families and 75% of the population were below the poverty line, including 85% of those under the age of 18 and none of those 65 or over.

== Education ==
Steamboat is served by the Ganado Unified School District.

The area is served by Ganado Primary School, Ganado Intermediate School, Ganado Middle School, and Ganado High School.

== Notable people ==
- Joe Hosteen Kellwood, Navajo Code Talker, was born in Steamboat Canyon.
