= Annie Dodge Wauneka =

Navajo Nation activist (1910–1997)

- Born: Annie Dodge; April 11, 1910; Deer Spring, near Sawmill, Arizona Territory, U.S.
- Died: November 10, 1997 (aged 87); Toyei, Arizona, U.S.
- Known for: Native American activist
- Office: Navajo Nation Council
- Spouse: George Wauneka (m. 1929; died 1994)
- Children: 6–10
- Parent(s): Henry Chee Dodge; K'eehabah
- Awards: Presidential Medal of Freedom; Navajo Medal of Honor; Indian Council Fire Achievement Award

Annie Dodge Wauneka (née Dodge; April 11, 1910 – November 10, 1997) was an influential member of the Navajo Nation as member of the Navajo Nation Council. As a member and three term head of the council's Health and Welfare Committee, she worked to improve the health and education of the Navajo. Wauneka is widely known for her countless efforts to improve health on the Navajo Nation, focusing mostly on the eradication of tuberculosis within her nation. She also authored a dictionary, in which translated English medical terms into the Navajo language. She was awarded the Presidential Medal of Freedom in 1963 by Lyndon B. Johnson as well as the Indian Council Fire Achievement Award and the Navajo Medal of Honor. She also received an honorary doctorate in Humanities (public health) from the University of New Mexico. In 2000, Wauneka was inducted into the National Women's Hall of Fame.

== Early life ==
Annie Dodge was the daughter of the Navajo leader Henry Chee Dodge and his third partner K'eehabah, or Mary Shirley Begaye, of Deer Spring, Arizona. K'eehabah was forced to associate with Chee and unwillingly lived with him, often returning to her family in the Deer Spring area. It was during this time Annie was born, approximately 2.5 miles (4 km) south of current-day Sawmill, Arizona. When Annie was a year old, she moved in with her father's family and was raised by her step-mother Nanabah and aunt Asdza Yazzie. At the age of five, Annie began helping her father herd various farm animals including horses, donkeys, and goats. In the summers, Annie would routinely visit her mother who also herded sheep. Annie also had a half-sister and five half brothers in Deer Spring, where their descendants still live today.

=== Education ===
In 1918 at the age of 8, she was sent to the Bureau of Indian Affairs Boarding School in Fort Defiance, Arizona, where she learned the English language. During that first year at school, the 1918 Spanish influenza pandemic struck the students and faculty. Annie recovered from a mild case of the flu and stayed at the school to help care for the other student flu victims. This experience helped inspire her later interest in public health. Annie would experience another epidemic during her fourth grade year when an outbreak of trachoma struck the Fort Defiance area. Following the outbreak, many students, including Annie, were sent to the nearby St. Michaels Catholic Mission. Beginning in the sixth grade, Annie attended the Albuquerque Indian School in Albuquerque, New Mexico. She attended the Albuquerque Indian School until she completed her studies in the eleventh grade.

Later in her life, Annie received a bachelor's degree in public health from the University of Arizona in Tucson, Arizona. She was also awarded with an honorary doctorate from the University of New Mexico.

During her time attending the Albuquerque Indian School, Annie met George Wauneka, whom she would later marry in 1929.

== Career ==
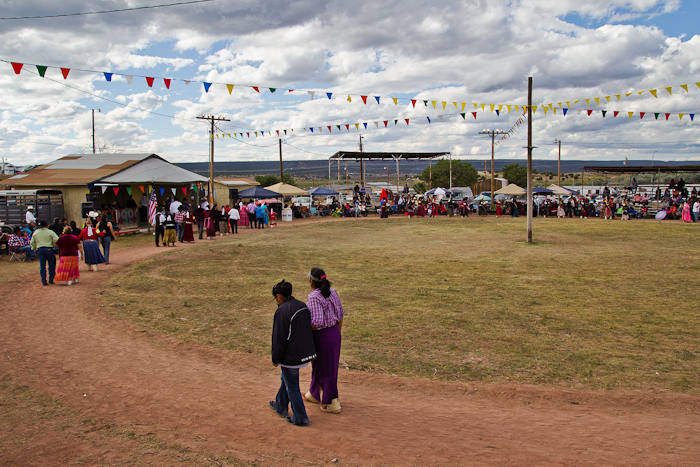
The Annie Wauneka Arena at the Navajo Nation fairgrounds in Window Rock, Arizona is named in honor of Mrs. Wauneka

Following graduation Annie married George Wauneka and traveled around the Navajo nation with her father. Seeing the lack of medical treatment and poverty Annie found her calling. In 1951, she became the second woman to be elected to the Tribal Council, after Lilly Neil. (Note: Several references, including Harrison Lapahie Annie Dodge Wauneka, 1999, have made the mistaken claim that Annie was the first women to be elected to the Council) She was immediately appointed head of the council's Health and Welfare Committee. She served in that committee for her 27 years in the council and served as its head for three terms. Wauneka accomplished much during her years on the council including translating medical terms into Navajo, a radio show explaining health issues, and better care for the community. Her work improved care for pregnant women, babies, eye and ear health, and alcoholism. Sanitation and housing improved under her term in the council. In 1953, her husband was running for the position that Wauneka had been holding, but she felt he was not a good candidate, so she ran against him and defeated him.

== Death ==
Wauneka died at a nursing home in Toyei, Arizona, on November 10, 1997.

== See also ==
- List of Native American politicians
- Native American women in politics
- Nicolle Gonzales, 21st-century Navajo women's healthcare activist
