= Toyei, Arizona =

CDP in Apache County, Arizona, US

- Census-designated place
- Location within Arizona
- Coordinates: 35°42′16″N 109°56′13″W
- Country: United States
- State: Arizona
- County: Apache

Area
  - Total: 0.33 sq mi (0.85 km^{2})
  - Land: 0.32 sq mi (0.84 km^{2})
  - Water: 0.0039 sq mi (0.01 km^{2})
- Elevation: 6,532 ft (1,991 m)

Population (2020)
  - Total: 2
  - Density: 6.2/sq mi (2.38/km^{2})
- Time zone: UTC-7 (MST)
- FIPS code: 04-75310
- GNIS feature ID: 2582882

Toyei is a census-designated place (CDP) in Apache County, Arizona, United States. The population was 13 at the 2010 census.

== Geography ==
According to the United States Census Bureau, the CDP has a total area of 0.31 square miles (0.8 km^{2}), all land.

== Demographics ==
Historical population
Census	Pop.	Note	%±
2010	13		—
2020	2		−84.6%
U.S. Decennial Census

== Education ==
It is in the Ganado Unified School District, which operates Ganado High School.

There was previously a Bureau of Indian Affairs (BIA) boarding school at Toyei. In 1979 Molly Ivins wrote that "The Toyei school used to be cited for its model dormitory program, but that has been discontinued."

== Notable people ==
- Annie Dodge Wauneka, activist and former Navajo Nation Council member
