= Ganado Airport =

Airport in Apache County, Arizona

Ganado Airport Lókʼaahnteeldi chidí naatʼaʼí ńdinibįįhígi (Navajo)
- IATA: none; ICAO: none; FAA LID: 85V

Summary
- Airport type: Public
- Owner: Navajo Nation
- Serves: Ganado, Arizona
- Elevation AMSL: 6,662 ft (2,031 m)
- Coordinates: 35°42′06″N 109°31′00″W

Map
- Location within Arizona Location within the United States

Runways
| Direction | Length | | Surface |
| Direction | ft | m | Surface |
|---|---|---|---|
| 18/36 | 4,500 | 1,372 | Dirt |
- Source: Federal Aviation Administration

Ganado Airport (FAA LID: 85V) was a public-use airport located 2.3 miles (2.0 nmi; 3.7 km) east of the central business district of Ganado, in Apache County, Arizona, United States. It is privately owned by the Navajo Nation government.

This airport was included in the FAA's National Plan of Integrated Airport Systems for 2009–2013, which categorized it as a general aviation facility.

== Facilities ==
Ganado Airport covers an area of 47 acres (19 ha) at an elevation of 6,662 feet (2,031 m) above mean sea level. It has one runway designated

- 18/36 with a dirt surface measuring 4,500 ft × 80 ft (1,372 m × 24 m).
