= Joe Hosteen Kellwood =

US Marine, Navajo code talker (1921–2016)

Joe Hosteen Kellwood (August 20, 1921 – September 5, 2016) was a United States Marine, best known for serving as a Navajo code talker during World War II.

Born in Steamboat Canyon, Arizona, on the Navajo Reservation, Kellwood was a carpenter. He served in the First Marine Division and served in the Pacific front, seeing battle in Cape Gloucester, Peleliu and Okinawa. He received the Congressional Silver Medal for his service. Kellwood died at the veterans hospital in Phoenix, Arizona.
