= Ganado Unified School District =

School district in Arizona, United States

Address
- Highway 264 Ganado, Arizona, 86505; United States

District information
- Type: Public
- Grades: PK–12
- Schools: 4
- NCES District ID: 0403290

Students and staff
- Students: 980 (2024–2025)
- Teachers: 73.00 (on an FTE basis) (2024–2025)
- Staff: 143.50 (on an FTE basis) (2024–2025)
- Student–teacher ratio: 13.42 (2024–2025)

Ganado Unified School District is located in Ganado, Arizona, Apache County. The district includes four schools: Ganado High School, Ganado Middle School, Ganado Intermediate School and Ganado Primary School. Ganado Primary School is known for effectively using a holistic approach to language and culture and as "one of the best examples of a school culture that supports professional development".

In addition to Ganado the district serves Burnside, Cornfields, Klagetoh, Steamboat, and Toyei.

Nearly 100 percent of the students in the district are Navajo, who speak Diné as their native language. Additionally 68 percent of Ganado Intermediate School's fourth, fifth, and sixth graders are classified as Limited English Proficient.
