= Burnside, Arizona =

CDP in Apache County, Arizona

Burnside, Arizona Naʼashǫ́ʼiitoʼí (Navajo)
- Census-designated place
- Location in Apache County and the state of Arizona

- Location in the United States
- Coordinates: 35°45′12″N 109°37′29″W
- Country: United States
- State: Arizona
- County: Apache

Area
  - Total: 9.27 sq mi (24.02 km^{2})
  - Land: 9.27 sq mi (24.02 km^{2})
  - Water: 0 sq mi (0.00 km^{2})
- Elevation: 6,395 ft (1,949 m)

Population (2020)
  - Total: 494
  - Density: 53.3/sq mi (20.56/km^{2})
- Time zone: UTC-7 (MST)
  - Summer (DST): UTC-6 (MDT)
- ZIP code: 86505
- Area code: 928
- FIPS code: 04-08535
- GNIS feature ID: 2407927

Burnside is a native village and census-designated place (CDP) on the Navajo Nation in Apache County, Arizona, United States. The population was 537 at the 2010 census.

== Geography ==
According to the United States Census Bureau, the CDP has a total area of 9.3 square miles (24 km^{2}), all land.

== Demographics ==
Historical population
Census	Pop.	Note	%±
2000	632		—
2010	537		−15.0%
2020	494		−8.0%
U.S. Decennial Census

Languages (2000)	Percent
Spoke English at home	57%
Spoke Navajo at home	43%

Burnside first appeared on the 2000 U.S. Census as a census-designated place (CDP).

As of the census of 2000, there were 632 people, 173 households, and 134 families residing in the CDP. The population density was 67.9 inhabitants per square mile (26.2/km^{2}). There were 216 housing units at an average density of 23.2 per square mile (9.0/km^{2}). The racial makeup of the CDP was 92% Native American, 7% White, 1% from other races, and <1% from two or more races. 1% of the population were Hispanic or Latino of any race.

There were 173 households, out of which 49% had children under the age of 18 living with them, 38% were married couples living together, 33% had a female householder with no husband present, and 22% were non-families. 21% of all households were made up of individuals, and 4% had someone living alone who was 65 years of age or older. The average household size was 3.65 and the average family size was 4.35.

In the CDP, the age distribution of the population shows 45% under the age of 18, 10% from 18 to 24, 27% from 25 to 44, 14% from 45 to 64, and 4% who were 65 years of age or older. The median age was 21 years. For every 100 females, there were 92.7 males. For every 100 females age 18 and over, there were 85.6 males.

The median income for a household in the CDP was $24,063, and the median income for a family was $25,441. Males had a median income of $18,661 versus $21,389 for females. The per capita income for the CDP was $8,236. About 31% of families and 39% of the population were below the poverty line, including 48% of those under age 18 and 13% of those age 65 or over.

== Education ==
Burnside is served by the Ganado Unified School District.

The area is served by Ganado Primary School, Ganado Intermediate School, Ganado Middle School, and Ganado High School.

== See also ==
- List of census-designated places in Arizona
