= Lilakai Julian Neil =

Lilakai (Lily) Julian Neil

Chairwoman of the Navajo Tribal Council leader

Personal details
- Born: 1900 Crownpoint, New Mexico
- Died: 1961 (aged 60–61)
- Nickname(s): Lily Neil, Lilly Neil, Lilly Neill

Lilakai (Lily) Julian Neil (1900 – 1961) was the first woman elected to the Navajo Tribal Council. After a serious automobile accident, she withdrew from public service.

In September 1947, Neil wrote a letter to Mr. Beatty, the General Director of Indian Education for the Education Division of the Department of the Interior. In her letter she was critical of the double bind placed upon the Navajo residents in the chapter that she represented (Delegate to the Navajo Nation Tribal Council, district 19). On the one hand the government encouraged the Navajos to get education so that they could get better employment and become self-sufficient. On the other hand, the government neglected agreements to supply adequate education and schools placed roadblocks to Navajos getting the necessary education. She pointed out that in the period after World War “when the (US) government is making all these big loans to foreign countries… Who tried to ruin us…, it seems as if they would try to do something for their poor little neglected children or wards at home who they made treaties with but most of them were never kept…”. This portion of the letter was cited by other authors to emphasize the mood of the Native Americans about post-war race relations and proposals to improve economic status of the Navajo Nation by dividing into four parts corresponding to the separate boundaries in the four states of the Four Corners.

Neil testified in hearings about the immunity of Indian territories from state jurisdiction and the tribal self-determination policy of the twentieth century.

Neil is associated with the founding of La Vida Mission, a Seventh-day Adventist mission center for the Navajo Nation in Farmington, New Mexico. A church at the mission, “Lily Neil Memorial Chapel”, is named in her honor.

== See also ==
- Bureau of Indian Education
- List of Native American politicians
- Native American women in politics
- Reservation poverty
- Stereotypes about indigenous peoples of North America
