= Ganado High School (Arizona) =

Public high school

Coordinates: 35°45′04″N 109°37′50″W

Location
- Hwy 264; Ganado, Arizona 86505; United States

Information
- School type: Public high school
- School district: Ganado Unified School District #20
- CEEB code: 030128
- Principal: Thomas Rowland
- Teaching staff: 28.00 (FTE)
- Grades: 9-12
- Enrollment: 390 (2024–2025)
- Student to teacher ratio: 13.93
- Colors: Maroon, white and Columbia blue
- Mascot: Hornets
- Website: ghs.ganado.k12.az.us

Ganado High School is a high school in Ganado, Arizona. It is the only high school under the jurisdiction of the Ganado Unified School District.

In addition to Ganado the district serves Burnside, Cornfields, Klagetoh, Steamboat, and Toyei.

== Notable alumni ==
- Shelly Lowe - chairperson of the National Endowment for the Humanities
