= Kids' Choice Award for Favorite Movie Actor =

Award

The Nickelodeon Kids' Choice Awards, run annually on United States television since 1988, includes a category for "Favorite Movie Actor".

The actor with most wins is Adam Sandler with 7 wins, following Jim Carrey with 5 wins and he also have received the most nominations as of the 2025 with 14 nominations.

== Winners and nominees ==
The winners are listed in bold.

Year	Actor	Role(s)	Film
**1988**; 2nd
**1988**; 2nd	**Eddie Murphy**	**Detective Axel Foley**	**Beverly Hills Cop II**
**1988**; 2nd	Arnold Schwarzenegger	Ben Richards	The Running Man
**1988**; 2nd	Patrick Swayze	Johnny Castle	Dirty Dancing
**1989**; 3rd
**1989**; 3rd	**Arnold Schwarzenegger**	**Julius Benedict**	**Twins**
**1989**; 3rd	Eddie Murphy	Prince Akeem	Coming to America
**1989**; 3rd	Paul Reubens	Pee Wee Herman	Big Top Pee-wee
**1990**; 4th
**1990**; 4th	**Michael J. Fox**	**Marty McFly / Marty McFly Jr. / Marlene McFly**	**Back to the Future Part II**
**1990**; 4th	Chevy Chase	Clark W. "Sparky" Griswold Jr.	National Lampoon's Christmas Vacation
**1990**; 4th	Eddie Murphy	Vernest "Quick" Brown	Harlem Nights
**1991**; 5th
**1991**; 5th	**Arnold Schwarzenegger**	**John Kimble**	**Kindergarten Cop**
**1991**; 5th	Johnny Depp	Edward Scissorhands	Edward Scissorhands
**1991**; 5th	Eddie Murphy	Reggie Hammond	Another 48 Hrs.
**1992**; 6th
**1992**; 6th	**Arnold Schwarzenegger**	**Terminator**	**Terminator 2**
**1992**; 6th	Ice Cube	Darrin "Doughboy" Baker	Boyz n the Hood
**1992**; 6th	Kid 'n Play	Duncan Pinderhughes and Michael Charles "Blade" Brown	Class Act
**1994**; 7th
**1994**; 7th	**Robin Williams**	**Daniel Hillard / Mrs. Euphegenia Doubtfire**	**Mrs. Doubtfire**
**1994**; 7th	Arnold Schwarzenegger	Jack Slater / Himself	Last Action Hero
**1994**; 7th	John Candy	Irving "Irv" Blitzer	Cool Runnings
**1995**; 8th
**1995**; 8th	**Jim Carrey**	**Ace Ventura**	**Ace Ventura: Pet Detective**
**1995**; 8th	Keanu Reeves	Jack Traven	Speed
**1995**; 8th	Tim Allen	Scott Calvin/Santa Claus	The Santa Clause
**1996**; 9th
**1996**; 9th	**Jim Carrey**	**Edward Nygma / The Riddler and Ace Ventura**	**Batman Forever and Ace Ventura: When Nature Calls**
**1996**; 9th	Tom Hanks	Jim Lovell	Apollo 13
**1996**; 9th	Jonathan Taylor Thomas	Tom Sawyer	Tom and Huck
**1996**; 9th	Robin Williams	Alan Parrish	Jumanji
**1997**; 10th
**1997**; 10th	**Jim Carrey**	**Ernie "Chip" Douglas**	**The Cable Guy**
**1997**; 10th	Tom Cruise	Ethan Hunt	Mission: Impossible
**1997**; 10th	Will Smith	Captain Steven Hiller	Independence Day
**1997**; 10th	Robin Williams	Jack Powell	Jack
**1998**; 11th
**1998**; 11th	**Will Smith**	**James Darrell Edwards III / Agent J**	**Men in Black**
**1998**; 11th	Tim Allen	Michael Cromwell	Jungle 2 Jungle
**1998**; 11th	Jim Carrey	Fletcher Reede	Liar Liar
**1998**; 11th	Robin Williams	Professor Philip Brainard	Flubber
**1999**; 12th
**1999**; 12th	**Adam Sandler**	**Robbie Hart and Bobby Boucher**	**The Wedding Singer and The Waterboy**
**1999**; 12th	Jim Carrey	Truman Burbank	The Truman Show
**1999**; 12th	Eddie Murphy	Dr. John Dolittle	Dr. Dolittle
**1999**; 12th	Chris Tucker	Detective James Carter	Rush Hour
**2000**; 13th
**2000**; 13th	**Adam Sandler**	**Sonny Koufax**	**Big Daddy**
**2000**; 13th	Mike Myers	Austin Powers/Dr. Evil/Fat Bastard	Austin Powers: The Spy Who Shagged Me
**2000**; 13th	Will Smith	Captain James T. West	Wild Wild West
**2000**; 13th	Robin Williams	Andrew Martin	Bicentennial Man
**2001**; 14th
**2001**; 14th	**Jim Carrey**	**The Grinch**	**Dr. Seuss' How the Grinch Stole Christmas**
**2001**; 14th	Tom Cruise	Ethan Hunt	Mission: Impossible II
**2001**; 14th	Martin Lawrence	Malcolm Turner / Hattie Mae 'Big Momma' Pierce	Big Momma's House
**2001**; 14th	Eddie Murphy	Professor Sherman Klump / Buddy Love / Cletus Klump / Young Cletus Klump / Ernie Klump Sr. / Anna Pearl Jenson-Klump / Ida Mae Jenson / Lance Perkins	Nutty Professor II: The Klumps
**2002**; 15th
**2002**; 15th	**Chris Tucker**	**Detective James Carter**	**Rush Hour 2**
**2002**; 15th	Jackie Chan	Chief Inspector Yan Naing Lee	Rush Hour 2
**2002**; 15th	Brendan Fraser	Rick O'Connell	The Mummy Returns
**2002**; 15th	Eddie Murphy	Dr. John Dolittle	Dr. Dolittle 2
**2003**; 16th
**2003**; 16th	**Adam Sandler**	**Longfellow Deeds**	**Mr. Deeds**
**2003**; 16th	Jackie Chan	Jimmy Tong	The Tuxedo
**2003**; 16th	Mike Myers	Austin Powers / Dr. Evil / Fat Bastard / Goldmember	Austin Powers in Goldmember
**2003**; 16th	Will Smith	James Darrell Edwards III / Agent J	Men in Black II
**2004**; 17th
**2004**; 17th	**Jim Carrey**	**Bruce Nolan**	**Bruce Almighty**
**2004**; 17th	Ashton Kutcher	Tom Leezak	Just Married
**2004**; 17th	Eddie Murphy	Charlie Hinton and Jim Evers	Daddy Day Care and The Haunted Mansion
**2004**; 17th	Mike Myers	The Cat in the Hat	The Cat in the Hat
**2005**; 18th
**2005**; 18th	**Adam Sandler**	**Henry Roth**	**50 First Dates**
**2005**; 18th	Tim Allen	Luther Krank	Christmas with the Kranks
**2005**; 18th	Jim Carrey	Count Olaf	Lemony Snicket's A Series of Unfortunate Events
**2005**; 18th	Tobey Maguire	Peter Parker / Spider-Man	Spider-Man 2
**2006**; 19th
**2006**; 19th	**Will Smith**	**Alex "Hitch" Hitchens**	**Hitch**
**2006**; 19th	Jim Carrey	Richard "Dick" Harper	Fun with Dick and Jane
**2006**; 19th	Johnny Depp	Willy Wonka	Charlie and the Chocolate Factory
**2006**; 19th	Ice Cube	Nicholas "Nick" Persons	Are We There Yet?
**2007**; 20th
**2007**; 20th	**Adam Sandler**	**Michael Newman**	**Click**
**2007**; 20th	Jack Black	Ignacio / Nacho	Nacho Libre
**2007**; 20th	Johnny Depp	Captain Jack Sparrow	Pirates of the Caribbean: Dead Man's Chest
**2007**; 20th	Will Smith	Chris Gardner	The Pursuit of Happyness
**2008**; 21st
**2008**; 21st	**Johnny Depp**	**Captain Jack Sparrow**	**Pirates of the Caribbean: At World's End**
**2008**; 21st	Ice Cube	Nicholas "Nick" Persons	Are We Done Yet?
**2008**; 21st	Dwayne "The Rock" Johnson	Joseph "Joe" Kingman	The Game Plan
**2008**; 21st	Eddie Murphy	Norbit Albert Rice / Rasputia Latimore / Mr. Hangten Wong	Norbit
**2009**; 22nd
**2009**; 22nd	**Will Smith**	**John Hancock**	**Hancock**
**2009**; 22nd	Jim Carrey	Carl Allen	Yes Man
**2009**; 22nd	George Lopez	Papi	Beverly Hills Chihuahua
**2009**; 22nd	Adam Sandler	Skeeter Bronson	Bedtime Stories
**2010**; 23rd
**2010**; 23rd	**Taylor Lautner**	**Jacob Black**	**The Twilight Saga: New Moon**
**2010**; 23rd	Zac Efron	Michael "Mike" O'Donnell	17 Again
**2010**; 23rd	Shia LaBeouf	Sam Witwicky	Transformers: Revenge of the Fallen
**2010**; 23rd	Tyler Perry	Mabel "Madea" Simmons / Uncle Joe Simmons / Brian Simmons	Madea Goes to Jail
**2011**; 24th
**2011**; 24th	**Johnny Depp**	**Tarrant Hightopp / The Mad Hatter**	**Alice in Wonderland**
**2011**; 24th	Jack Black	Lemuel Gulliver	Gulliver's Travels
**2011**; 24th	Dwayne Johnson	Derek Thompson / Tooth Fairy	Tooth Fairy
**2011**; 24th	Jaden Smith	Dre Parker	The Karate Kid
**2012**; 25th
**2012**; 25th	**Adam Sandler**	**Jack Sadelstein / Jill Sadelstein**	**Jack and Jill**
**2012**; 25th	Jim Carrey	Thomas "Tom" Popper Jr.	Mr. Popper's Penguins
**2012**; 25th	Johnny Depp	Jack Sparrow	Pirates of the Caribbean: On Stranger Tides
**2012**; 25th	Daniel Radcliffe	Harry Potter	Harry Potter and the Deathly Hallows – Part 2
**2013**; 26th
**2013**; 26th	**Johnny Depp**	**Barnabas Collins**	**Dark Shadows**
**2013**; 26th	Andrew Garfield	Peter Parker / Spider-Man	The Amazing Spider-Man
**2013**; 26th	Zachary Gordon	Gregory "Greg" Heffley	Diary of a Wimpy Kid: Dog Days
**2013**; 26th	Will Smith	James Darrell Edwards III / Agent J	Men in Black 3
**2014**; 27th
**2014**; 27th	**Adam Sandler**	**Lenny Feder**	**Grown Ups 2**
**2014**; 27th	Johnny Depp	Tonto	The Lone Ranger
**2014**; 27th	Robert Downey Jr.	Tony Stark / Iron Man	Iron Man 3
**2014**; 27th	Neil Patrick Harris	Patrick Winslow	The Smurfs 2
**2015**; 28th
**2015**; 28th	**Ben Stiller**	**Larry Daley**	**Night at the Museum: Secret of the Tomb**
**2015**; 28th	Will Arnett	Vern Fenwick	Teenage Mutant Ninja Turtles
**2015**; 28th	Steve Carell	Benjamin "Ben" Cooper	Alexander and the Terrible, Horrible, No Good, Very Bad Day
**2015**; 28th	Jamie Foxx	Max Dillon / Electro	The Amazing Spider-Man 2
**2015**; 28th	Hugh Jackman	Logan / Wolverine	X-Men: Days of Future Past
**2015**; 28th	Mark Wahlberg	Cade Yeager	Transformers: Age of Extinction
**2016**; 29th
**2016**; 29th	**Will Ferrell**	**Brad Whitaker**	**Daddy's Home**
**2016**; 29th	John Boyega	Finn	Star Wars: The Force Awakens
**2016**; 29th	Robert Downey Jr.	Tony Stark / Iron Man	Avengers: Age of Ultron
**2016**; 29th	Chris Evans	Steve Rogers / Captain America	Avengers: Age of Ultron
**2016**; 29th	Chris Hemsworth	Thor	Avengers: Age of Ultron
**2016**; 29th	Chris Pratt	Owen Grady	Jurassic World
**2017**; 30th
**2017**; 30th	**Chris Hemsworth**	**Kevin Beckman**	**Ghostbusters**
**2017**; 30th	Ben Affleck	Bruce Wayne / Batman	Batman v Superman: Dawn of Justice
**2017**; 30th	Will Arnett	Vern Fenwick	Teenage Mutant Ninja Turtles: Out of the Shadows
**2017**; 30th	Henry Cavill	Kal-El / Clark Kent / Superman	Batman v Superman: Dawn of Justice
**2017**; 30th	Robert Downey Jr.	Tony Stark / Iron Man	Captain America: Civil War
**2017**; 30th	Chris Evans	Steve Rogers / Captain America	Captain America: Civil War
**2018**; 31st
**2018**; 31st	**Dwayne Johnson**	**Dr. Smolder Bravestone**	**Jumanji: Welcome to the Jungle**
**2018**; 31st	Ben Affleck	Bruce Wayne / Batman	Justice League
**2018**; 31st	Will Ferrell	Brad Whitaker	Daddy's Home 2
**2018**; 31st	Kevin Hart	Franklin "Mouse" Finbar	Jumanji: Welcome to the Jungle
**2018**; 31st	Chris Hemsworth	Thor	Thor: Ragnarok
**2018**; 31st	Chris Pratt	Peter Quill / Star-Lord	Guardians of the Galaxy Vol. 2
**2019**; 32nd
**2019**; 32nd	**Noah Centineo**	**Peter Kavinsky**	**To All the Boys I've Loved Before**
**2019**; 32nd	Chadwick Boseman	T'Challa / Black Panther	Black Panther
**2019**; 32nd	Chris Evans	Steve Rogers / Captain America	Avengers: Infinity War
**2019**; 32nd	Chris Hemsworth	Thor	Avengers: Infinity War
**2019**; 32nd	Dwayne Johnson	Will Sawyer	Skyscraper
**2019**; 32nd	Jason Momoa	Arthur Curry / Aquaman	Aquaman
**2020**; 33rd
**2020**; 33rd	**Dwayne Johnson**	**Dr. Xander "Smolder" Bravestone and Luke Hobbs**	**Jumanji: The Next Level and Hobbs & Shaw**
**2020**; 33rd	Chris Evans	Steve Rogers / Captain America	Avengers: Endgame
**2020**; 33rd	Kevin Hart	Franklin "Mouse" Finbar	Jumanji: The Next Level
**2020**; 33rd	Chris Hemsworth	Thor and Henry / Agent H	Avengers: Endgame and Men in Black: International
**2020**; 33rd	Tom Holland	Peter Parker / Spider-Man	Spider-Man: Far From Home
**2020**; 33rd	Will Smith	Genie	Aladdin
**2021**; 34th
**2021**; 34th	**Robert Downey Jr.**	**Dr. John Dolittle**	**Dolittle**
**2021**; 34th	Jim Carrey	Dr. Robotnik	Sonic the Hedgehog
**2021**; 34th	Will Ferrell	Lars Erickssong	Eurovision Song Contest: The Story of Fire Saga
**2021**; 34th	Lin-Manuel Miranda	Alexander Hamilton	Hamilton
**2021**; 34th	Chris Pine	Steve Trevor	Wonder Woman 1984
**2021**; 34th	Adam Sandler	Hubie Dubois	Hubie Halloween
**2022**; 35th
**2022**; 35th	**Tom Holland**	**Peter Parker / Spider-Man**	**Spider-Man: No Way Home**
**2022**; 35th	John Cena	Jakob Toretto	F9: The Fast Saga
**2022**; 35th	Vin Diesel	Dominic Toretto	F9: The Fast Saga
**2022**; 35th	LeBron James	Himself	Space Jam: A New Legacy
**2022**; 35th	Dwayne Johnson	Frank Wolff and John Hartley	Jungle Cruise and Red Notice
**2022**; 35th	Ryan Reynolds	Guy and Nolan Booth	Free Guy and Red Notice
**2023**; 36th
**2023**; 36th	**Dwayne Johnson**	**Black Adam/Teth-Adam**	**Black Adam**
**2023**; 36th	Jim Carrey	Dr. Robotnik	Sonic the Hedgehog 2
**2023**; 36th	Chris Hemsworth	Thor	Thor: Love and Thunder
**2023**; 36th	Chris Pratt	Owen Grady	Jurassic World Dominion
**2023**; 36th	Ryan Reynolds	Big Adam	The Adam Project
**2023**; 36th	Tom Cruise	Capt. Pete "Maverick" Mitchell	Top Gun: Maverick
**2024**; 37th
**2024**; 37th	**Timothée Chalamet**	**Willy Wonka**	**Wonka**
**2024**; 37th	Adam Sandler	Danny Friedman	You Are So Not Invited to My Bat Mitzvah
**2024**; 37th	Chris Pratt	Peter Quill/Star-Lord	Guardians of the Galaxy Vol. 3
**2024**; 37th	Jason Momoa	Arthur Curry/Aquaman	Aquaman and the Lost Kingdom
**2024**; 37th	John Cena	Jakob Toretto	Fast X
**2024**; 37th	Paul Rudd	Gary Grooberson	Ghostbusters: Frozen Empire
**2024**; 37th	Ryan Gosling	Ken	Barbie
**2024**; 37th	Ryan Reynolds	Cal	IF
**2025**; 38th
**2025**; 38th	**Jack Black**	**Steve**	**A Minecraft Movie**
**2025**; 38th	Chris Pratt	Keats	The Electric State
**2025**; 38th	Dwayne Johnson	Callum Drift	Red One
**2025**; 38th	Jason Momoa	Garrett Garrison	A Minecraft Movie
**2025**; 38th	Chris Evans	Jack O'Malley	Red One
**2025**; 38th	Jim Carrey	Dr. Robotnik	Sonic the Hedgehog 3
**2026**; 39th
**2026**; 39th	**Tom Holland**	**Peter Parker / Spiderman**	**Spider-Man: Brand New Day**
**2026**; 39th	Adam Sandler	Happy Gilmore	Happy Gilmore 2
**2026**; 39th	David Corenswet	Clark Kent / Superman	Superman
**2026**; 39th	Dwayne Johnson	Maui	Moana
**2026**; 39th	Hugh Jackman	George Handy	The Sheep Detectives
**2026**; 39th	John Cena	Buddy Crane	Coyote vs. Acme
**2026**; 39th	Ryan Gosling	Ryland Grace	Project Hail Mary
**2026**; 39th	Zach Galifianakis	Dr. Jumba Jookiba	Lilo & Stitch

== Most wins ==
7 wins

- Adam Sandler (2 consecutive)

5 wins

- Jim Carrey (3 consecutive)

3 wins

- Johnny Depp
- Dwayne Johnson
- Arnold Schwarzenegger (2 consecutive)
- Will Smith

2 wins

- Tom Holland

== Most nominations ==
14 nominations

- Jim Carrey

11 nominations

- Adam Sandler

9 nominations

- Dwayne Johnson
- Eddie Murphy
- Will Smith

8 nominations

- Johnny Depp

6 nominations

- Chris Hemsworth

5 nominations

- Chris Evans
- Chris Pratt
- Arnold Schwarzenegger
- Robin Williams

4 nominations

- Robert Downey Jr.

3 nominations

- Tim Allen
- Jack Black
- John Cena
- Tom Cruise
- Ice Cube
- Tom Holland
- Will Ferrell
- Mike Myers
- Jason Momoa
- Ryan Reynolds

2 nominations

- Ben Affleck
- Will Arnett
- Jackie Chan
- Ryan Gosling
- Kevin Hart
- Hugh Jackman
