= 2000 Kids' Choice Awards =

Children's television awards show program broadcast in 2000

- Date: April 15, 2000
- Location: Hollywood Bowl
- Hosted by: Rosie O'Donnell

Highlights
- Most awards: Will Smith (3)
- Most nominations: Will Smith (4)

Television/radio coverage
- Network: Nickelodeon
- Runtime: 61 minutes
- Viewership: 3.70 million
- Produced by: Marilyn Seabury
- Directed by: Glenn Weiss

The 13th Annual Nickelodeon Kids' Choice Awards was held on April 15, 2000, at the Hollywood Bowl in Los Angeles, live on Nickelodeon, with around 17,000 in attendance at the venue. Rosie O'Donnell hosted for the fifth consecutive year, along with LL Cool J, David Arquette, Mandy Moore, and Frankie Muniz as co-hosts. The show featured a SpongeBob SquarePants short to introduce the Favorite Cartoon nominees and announce the winner.

Over 15 million voters cast ballots for the ceremony, including for ten online-only categories.

== Performers ==
- Goo Goo Dolls - "Broadway" & "Slide"
- Jennifer Lopez - Intro: "Let's Get Loud", "Feelin' So Good"
- *NSYNC - "Bye, Bye, Bye"
- Jessica Simpson & Nick Lachey - "Where You Are"

== Winners and nominees ==
Winners are listed first and in boldface.

=== Movies ===
Favorite Movie	Favorite Movie Actor
**Big Daddy**; Austin Powers: The Spy Who Shagged Me; Pokémon: The First Movie; Toy Story 2	**Adam Sandler (Sonny Koufax)** – Big Daddy; Mike Myers (Austin Powers/Dr. Evil/Fat Bastard) – Austin Powers: The Spy Who Shagged Me; Will Smith (Captain James T. West) – Wild Wild West; Robin Williams (Andrew Martin) – Bicentennial Man
Favorite Movie Actress	Favorite Voice from an Animated Movie
**Melissa Joan Hart (Nicole Maris)** – Drive Me Crazy; Drew Barrymore (Josie Geller) – Never Been Kissed; Sandra Bullock (Sarah Lewis) – Forces of Nature; Julia Roberts (Anna Scott; Maggie Carpenter) – Notting Hill and Runaway Bride	**Rosie O'Donnell (Terk)** – Tarzan; Tim Allen (Buzz Lightyear) – Toy Story 2; Michael J. Fox (Stuart Little) – Stuart Little; Tom Hanks (Sheriff Woody) – Toy Story 2
Favorite Movie Couple
**Freddie Prinze Jr. (Zack Siler) and Rachael Leigh Cook (Laney Boggs)** – She's All That; Ben Affleck (Ben Holmes) and Sandra Bullock (Sarah Lewis) – Forces of Nature; Mike Myers (Austin Powers) and Heather Graham (Felicity Shagwell) – Austin Powers: The Spy Who Shagged Me; Julia Roberts (Anna Scott) and Hugh Grant (William Thacker) – Notting Hill

=== Television ===
Favorite TV Show	Favorite TV Actor
**All That**; 7th Heaven; Boy Meets World; Sabrina the Teenage Witch	**Kenan Thompson (Various Characters)** – All That; Drew Carey (Drew Carey) – The Drew Carey Show; Michael J. Fox (Mike Flaherty) – Spin City; Jamie Foxx (Jamie King) – The Jamie Foxx Show
Favorite TV Actress	Favorite Cartoon
**Amanda Bynes (Various Characters)** – The Amanda Show & All That; Brandy (Moesha Mitchell) – Moesha; Melissa Joan Hart (Sabrina Spellman) – Sabrina the Teenage Witch; Jennifer Love Hewitt (Sarah Reeves Merrin) – Party of Five	**Rugrats**; CatDog; Pokémon; The Simpsons
Favorite TV Friends
**Ben Savage (Cory Matthews) and Rider Strong (Shawn Hunter)** – Boy Meets World; Jennifer Aniston (Rachel Green), Courteney Cox (Monica Geller), and Lisa Kudrow (Phoebe Buffay) – Friends; David Duchovny (Fox Mulder) and Gillian Anderson (Dana Scully) – The X-Files; Sarah Michelle Gellar (Buffy Summers) and David Boreanaz (Angel) – Buffy the Vampire Slayer

=== Music ===
Favorite Male Singer	Favorite Female Singer
**Will Smith**; Jordan Knight; Ricky Martin; Tyrese	**Britney Spears**; Christina Aguilera; Brandy; Jennifer Lopez
Favorite Music Group	Favorite Band
**Backstreet Boys**; 98 Degrees; *NSYNC; TLC	**Smash Mouth**; Dixie Chicks; Sixpence None the Richer; Sugar Ray
Favorite Song	Favorite New Music Artist
**"Wild Wild West"** – Will Smith; "(You Drive Me) Crazy" – Britney Spears; "All Star" – Smash Mouth; "Bug-a-Boo" – Destiny's Child	**Jennifer Lopez**; Christina Aguilera; Lou Bega; LFO
Favorite Song from a Movie
**"Wild Wild West"** – Will Smith (from Wild Wild West); "Beautiful Stranger" – Madonna (from Austin Powers: The Spy Who Shagged Me); "Music of My Heart" – Gloria Estefan & *NSYNC (from Music of the Heart); "Two Worlds" – Phil Collins (from Tarzan)

=== Sports ===
Favorite Male Athlete	Favorite Female Athlete
**Shaquille O'Neal**; Mark McGwire; Deion Sanders; Tiger Woods	**Tara Lipinski**; Mia Hamm; Lisa Leslie; Venus Williams
Favorite Sports Team	Favorite MVP
**New York Yankees**; Dallas Cowboys; Los Angeles Lakers; San Francisco 49ers	**Cynthia Cooper**; Tim Duncan; Chipper Jones; Kurt Warner

=== Others ===
Favorite Video Game	Favorite Animal Star
**Pokémon**; Donkey Kong 64; Mario Party; Toy Story 2: Buzz Lightyear to the Rescue	**Salem** – Sabrina the Teenage Witch; Happy – 7th Heaven; Stuart Little – Stuart Little; Rowdy – 100 Deeds for Eddie McDowd
Favorite Book	Favorite Rising Star
**Harry Potter series**; Animorphs series; Chicken Soup for the Child's Soul; Star Wars: Episode I – The Phantom Menace	**Mandy Moore** – I Wanna Be With You; Vince Carter – Toronto Raptors; Frankie Muniz (Malcolm) – Malcolm in the Middle; Haley Joel Osment (Cole Sear) – The Sixth Sense

== Hall of Fame ==
- Rosie O'Donnell

This was the final Hall of Fame award because the next year would introduce the Wannabe Award.
