= List of Austin Powers characters =

The following is a list of fictional characters from the Austin Powers film series, which includes Austin Powers: International Man of Mystery (1997), Austin Powers: The Spy Who Shagged Me (1999) and Austin Powers in Goldmember (2002). The films are written by Mike Myers and directed by Jay Roach. Many of the characters are based on characters from the James Bond films.

== Characters ==
- Alotta Fagina is the secretary of Number 2 in Austin Powers: International Man of Mystery. According to ScreenRant, Alotta is based on the James Bond characters Pussy Galore and Fiona Volpe. Alotta is portrayed by Fabiana Udenio.
- Austin Powers is a flamboyant English spy and the protagonist of the series. The character is based on James Bond and is portrayed by Mike Myers in all three Austin Powers films.
- Basil Exposition works for British Intelligence as Austin's controller. According to ScreenRant, the character is based on M from the James Bond films. Basil is portrayed by Michael York in all three Austin Powers films.
- Dr. Evil is the archenemy of Austin and the main antagonist of the series. He is a criminal mastermind who concocts diabolical schemes. In Goldmember, it is revealed that he is Austin's brother. The character is based on Ernst Stavro Blofeld, and is portrayed by Mike Myers in all three Austin Powers films.
- Fat Bastard is a Scottish henchman of Dr. Evil. He is obese and is described as weighing a metric ton. In The Spy Who Shagged Me, he steals Austin's mojo. In Goldmember, he has become a professional sumo wrestler in Japan. He is portrayed by Mike Myers.
- Felicity Shagwell is a CIA agent who is Austin's spy partner in The Spy Who Shagged Me. Throughout the course of the film, the two develop a romantic relationship. According to ScreenRant, the character is based on Anya Amasova. Felicity was originally intended to appear in Goldmember, but the scene was cut. Felicity is portrayed by Heather Graham.
- Foxxy Cleopatra is Austin's spy partner in Austin Powers in Goldmember. She is an African-American woman from the 1970s who works for Goldmember. Her character was inspired by Rosie Carver and blaxploitation-style characters played by Pam Grier and Tamara Dobson. Foxxy is portrayed by Beyoncé Knowles.
- Frau Farbissina is one of Dr. Evil's lieutenants and Scott's mother. The character is a parody of Rosa Klebb from From Russia With Love. She is portrayed by Mindy Sterling in all three Austin Powers films.
- Ivana Humpalot is a Russian model who is sent by Dr. Evil to kill Austin, but ends up falling for his charms. According to ScreenRant, the character is based on Xenia Onatopp. She is portrayed by Kristen Johnston in The Spy Who Shagged Me.
- Johann van der Smut, also known as Goldmember, is an antagonist in Austin Powers in Goldmember. He is the Dutch owner of a roller disco club who lost his genitals in a smelting accident. The character is based on Auric Goldfinger and is portrayed by Mike Myers.
- Mini-Me is a dwarf clone of Dr. Evil who cannot talk. He eventually develops a rivalry with Scott Evil for Dr. Evil's affection. After being rejected by Dr. Evil, Mini-Me defects and joins Austin at British Intelligence. The character is based on the characters Nick Nack and Majai and is portrayed by Verne Troyer in The Spy Who Shagged Me and Goldmember.
- Mr. Roboto is a Japanese businessman and the owner of Roboto Industries. He builds a tractor beam for Dr. Evil in Goldmember. He is based on Mr. Osato and portrayed by Nobu Matsuhisa.
- Mrs. Kensington is Austin's spy partner from the 1960s, and Vanessa's mother. The character is based on Emma Peel and is portrayed by Mimi Rogers in Austin Powers: International Man of Mystery.
- Mustafa is one of Dr. Evil's henchmen who is seemingly killed by Dr. Evil in the first film. In The Spy Who Shagged Me, Mustafa returns and is interrogated by Austin and Felicity Shagwell. He is portrayed by Will Ferrell in Austin Powers: International Man of Mystery and The Spy Who Shagged Me.
- Nigel Powers is a British spy and the father of Austin and Dr. Evil (Dougie Powers). Nigel was absent for much of Austin's childhood, and his relationship with Austin is strained during Austin's adulthood. Nigel is portrayed by Michael Caine and Scott Aukerman in Goldmember.
- Number 2 is Dr. Evil's second-in-command. In the first film, he has developed Virtucon, the legitimate face of Dr. Evil's empire, into a multibillion-dollar enterprise. Number 2 later attempts to betray Dr. Evil, but Dr. Evil uses a trap door to eliminate him. In The Spy Who Shagged Me, it is revealed that Number 2 has survived. According to ScreenRant, Number 2 is based on Emilio Largo, a henchman of Ernst Stavro Blofeld who uses the codename "Number 2" in the 1965 James Bond film Thunderball. Number 2 is portrayed by Robert Wagner in all three films. Rob Lowe plays a younger version of the character in The Spy Who Shagged Me and Goldmember; since 2022, Lowe replaced Wagner as the main Number 2 in television commercials featuring Dr. Evil's organization.
- Number 3 is an undercover British agent. He is assigned as a mole in Dr. Evil's organization, and he has a large mole on his face. Number 3 is portrayed by Fred Savage in Goldmember.
- Paddy O'Brien is an Irish assassin hired by Dr. Evil to kill Austin. In the first film, Austin thwarts O'Brien's assassination attempt in a Las Vegas casino bathroom and kills him. O'Brien is portrayed by Paul Dillon.
- Random Task is a Korean assassin who throws his shoe at his targets. He is based on the character Oddjob from the James Bond film Goldfinger, and is portrayed by Joe Son in Austin Powers: International Man of Mystery.
- Scott Evil is Dr. Evil's son. Upset that Dr. Evil was absent his entire life, Scott at first refuses to bond with him. Later, Scott competes with Mini-Me for Dr. Evil's affection. Scott is portrayed by Seth Green in all three Austin Powers films.
- Vanessa Kensington is Austin's spy partner in Austin Powers: International Man of Mystery. At the end of the film, she and Austin get married. In The Spy Who Shagged Me, Vanessa is revealed to be an android "fembot" controlled by Dr. Evil, who causes her to self-destruct. According to ScreenRant, the character is based on Tracy Bond. Vanessa is portrayed by Elizabeth Hurley.
