= Beautiful Stranger =

1999 single by Madonna

Single by Madonna

from the album Austin Powers: The Spy Who Shagged Me
- Released: May 19, 1999
- Recorded: February 1999
- Studio: Guerilla Beach; (Los Angeles, California); Enterprise; (Burbank, California)
- Genre: Psychedelic pop; disco
- Length: 4:22
- Label: Maverick; Warner Bros.
- Songwriters: Madonna; William Orbit
- Producers: Madonna; William Orbit

Madonna singles chronology
"Nothing Really Matters" (1999)	"Beautiful Stranger" (1999)	"American Pie" (2000)

Music video
- "Beautiful Stranger" on YouTube

"Beautiful Stranger" is a song by American singer and songwriter Madonna. It was released on May 19, 1999, by Maverick and Warner Bros. Records as a single from the soundtrack of the film, Austin Powers: The Spy Who Shagged Me. Madonna co-wrote and co-produced the song with William Orbit. The soundtrack for Austin Powers: The Spy Who Shagged Me was a much expected release and Madonna's song was chosen by the album's executive producers to promote it. "Beautiful Stranger" has appeared on three separate Madonna greatest hits collections: GHV2 (2001), Celebration (2009) and Finally Enough Love: 50 Number Ones (2022). Musically, "Beautiful Stranger" is a psychedelic pop and disco song that features heavily reverberated guitars and bouncy drum loops. Its lyrics tell the tale of a romantic infatuation.

The song received positive feedback from music critics who praised the production and Madonna's musical progression. It was a commercial success reaching the top of the charts in Canada, Finland, Iceland and Italy, number two in the United Kingdom and top-ten in many markets. Although the song was not commercially released in the United States, it reached number 19 on the Billboard Hot 100 due to airplay. It reached number one on the US dance charts. "Beautiful Stranger" also earned Madonna her fifth Grammy Award, winning the trophy for Best Song Written for Visual Media.

The song's music video, directed by Brett Ratner, prominently features Madonna singing in a club, visited by Mike Myers as his character Austin Powers. At the end of the video Madonna seduces Myers and goes off in his car. It won the MTV Video Music Award for Best Video from a Film in 1999. Madonna performed the song on her 2001 Drowned World Tour, and it has been covered by some artists, including a critically acclaimed version by Australian rock band DMA's.

== Background and release ==
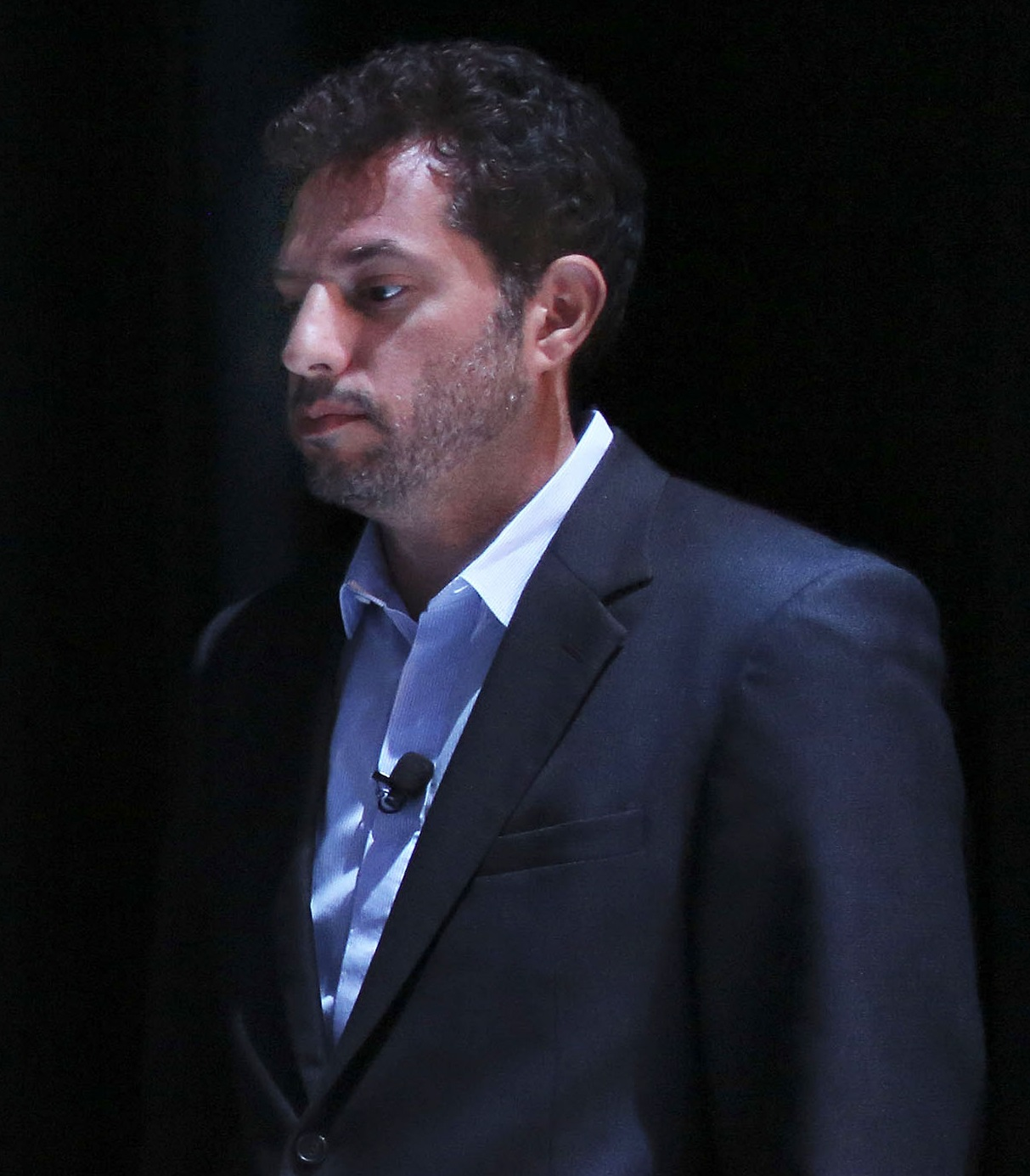
Guy Oseary was one of the executive producers on the Austin Powers soundtrack and chose "Beautiful Stranger" as the first single.

Madonna and Canadian actor Mike Myers had previously collaborated for an episode of Saturday Night Live in 1991, when the singer hosted the show and invited Myers' character, Wayne Campbell to play a game of truth or dare, while pitching her documentary Madonna: Truth or Dare. According to Gwen Ihnat from The A.V. Club, the "creative partnership [between them] works because Madonna, though serious, always seems game, and Myers, though frequently goofy, is also creatively inventive". In 1999, the singer was chosen to contribute a single on the soundtrack for Myers' second film about the spy character Austin Powers, titled Austin Powers: The Spy Who Shagged Me. Madonna's former boyfriend, British screenwriter Andy Bird, was reportedly the inspiration for "Beautiful Stranger."

The soundtrack to The Spy Who Shagged Me led to the teaming up of two music executives, Warner Bros. Records senior vice president Danny Bramson and Madonna's Maverick Records' co-owner Guy Oseary; both of them served as executive producer on the soundtrack. By May 1999, expectations were already high for the release, so the producers decided to include Madonna's track along with a song from a number of other high-profile artists like R.E.M., Lenny Kravitz and Mel B from the Spice Girls.

As recalled by Oseary, there was intense competition among artists to have their songs placed in the soundtrack, with one manager connected to the project describing the fight for the first potential single release as "a blood bath". The main intention of the producers was to have the artists contribute music which would abide by the predominant 1960s mood of the film. Ultimately, it was decided that "Beautiful Stranger" was suitable for this, and it was chosen as the first single from the soundtrack. However, Madonna's recording company Warner Bros. decided not to release any CD single or remix singles to accompany the release in the United States, only promo 12-inch discs were sent to the dance club DJs. The song was only released to the CHR top 40 radio for airplay on May 19, 1999. In the United Kingdom, the single was released on June 7, 1999, as a CD single, 12-inch single, and cassette single, while in Canada, a CD was issued on July 20, 1999. "Beautiful Stranger" has appeared on two separate Madonna greatest hits collections: GHV2 (2001) and Celebration (2009). On May 21, 2021, Madonna released the "Beautiful Stranger" remix EP to all digital and streaming outlets.

== Recording and composition ==
Recording for "Beautiful Stranger" took place in February 1999 at the Guerilla Beach Studios in Los Angeles, California, as well as the Enterprise Studio in Burbank, California. Along with writing and producing the song with Madonna, Orbit also played the keyboards and the guitar on the track. Damian LeGassick did the programming and additional keyboard while Emma Fowler played the flute. The engineering team included Pat McCarthy, Mark Endert and Dave Chelsea, with McCarthy also mixing the track. Jeff Gregmay and Wassim Zartek were the assistant recording engineers. According to the sheet music published by Musicnotes.com, "Beautiful Stranger" is set in common time and is composed in a key of F♯ major with a mid dance tempo of 128 beats per minute. The song begins with a basic sequence of E–B–F♯–A–C♯ before moving to the main chord progression of C♯_{sus4}–C♯_{7}.

"Beautiful Stranger" is a psychedelic pop and disco song and begins with a musical instrumentation reminiscent of "Light My Fire" (1967) by The Doors and "Lucy in the Sky with Diamonds" (1967) by The Beatles. The song's main structure is backed by guitar, while drums come in during the choruses. Around the 1:06 mark, there is a hint of mellotron and flute being played like The Beatles' 1967 songs "Strawberry Fields Forever" or "The Fool on the Hill". The song has similar composition to Madonna's endeavors with her previous album Ray of Light, mixed with psychedelic music. USA Today's Ken Barnes has suggested that the chorus, riff, instrumentation and structure of "Beautiful Stranger" were based on American rock band Love's 1966 single "She Comes in Colors". The band's record company—Rhino Records—executive Gary Stewart stated that "Certainly, the riff and instrumentation [of 'Beautiful Stranger'] are reminiscent of 'She Comes in Colors,'" and that the "da da da da da" chorus on the track seems to be based upon "an instrumental flourish that's an integral part of the [Love] record. It may be a conscious or an unconscious homage." Madonna denied any such influence, claiming that she had never heard of Love.

Blur guitarist Graham Coxon later recalled hearing an early version of this song's backing track in 1998, while the band was working with Orbit on their album 13: "We had a go at doing something over a beat that William had put together. I remember really, really liking jamming over it, but we didn’t get anywhere with it. And then later on that same year, Madonna came out with 'Beautiful Stranger.' I’m like, 'Oh, that’s that track!'”

According to Michael Paoletta from Billboard, "no fierce-ruling club DJ in 1999 would [have] dared play the original jangly rock-etched version of the song". Hence the song was remixed by Victor Calderone, who kept the basic structure of the song, while mixing it with tribal infused beats. Unlike many of his then releases—where he removed the bulk of the song's lyrics for remixing—with "Beautiful Stranger" he kept them. Paoletta described the remixes as "if Calderone fully understands the importance of a song and understands how best to unite deft beats and a dazzling vocal performance." The remixes include a rock-leaning version as well as Calderone's Club and Radio mixes.

== Critical reception ==
"It's always a joy when a well-established artist is able to show that he or she is as creatively inspired as ever. ['Beautiful Stranger'] does nothing but further Madonna's essential place in pop culture through the '80s, '90s, and now, beyond. Credible and utterly exceptional."

— Chuck Taylor from Billboard reviewing "Beautiful Stranger".

"Beautiful Stranger" received generally positive reviews. Chuck Taylor from Billboard denoted the song as a "new shift in the wind for [Madonna]", calling it another creative high for her. He also complimented the production saying that "this latest partnership with [Orbit] taps into a walloping romp of guitars and enough cascading organs to prompt an urge to listen to your Monkees collection." Taylor ended the review with positive feedback for Madonna's vocals, likening them to those for the Evita album, along with commending the chorus. In a different article for Billboard talking about the song's remixes, Paoletta described the track as "effervescent blast of psychedelic electronica". Writing for the Philippine Daily Inquirer, Gino DeLa Paz found it "cute but forgettable". Gwen Ihnat, from the entertainment website The A.V. Club, labeled it as "Madonna's best song that never appeared on one of her regular albums [...] a psychedelic pop confection that offered a few of her most indelible hooks". Ihnat also wrote that "although less ethereal than 1998's Ray of Light, ['Beautiful Stranger'] is just as dance-floor ready [...] dance flute has never sounded so enticing, and Madonna's voice so sweetly seductive". AllMusic's Jose F. Promis listed the track "as one of the singer's more memorable moments, coupling 1960s go-go rock with 1990s electronica, resulting in nothing less than a true slice of old fashioned rock & roll"; Promis also praised the two Calderone mixes.

Slant Magazine's Sal Cinquemani gave the song a rating of B− and wrote: "Like any good throwaway track, 'Beautiful Stranger' doesn't pretend to be much more than it is. Whiny guitars and flutes abound, Madonna and Orbit concocted a perfect theme song for friend Mike Myers's cooky Austin Powers: The Spy Who Shagged Me. Playful, wispy and ultimately forgettable". In August 2018, Paul Schrodt from the same magazine, placed it at number 53 on his ranking of the singer's singles, calling it "the antithesis of Ray of Light. The hooky, psychedelic track is more accessible than Madonna’s previous work with Orbit. The innocuous lyrics could’ve been ghostwritten for anyone, but the song endears due to Madge’s playful delivery and Orbit’s sonic details". Ken Tucker from Entertainment Weekly, declared it as the "song of the summer", and praised it for being "a piece of psychedelic pop at once so 60s and so 90s that to sully it with a 'shagalicious' joke would be an insult... The way [Madonna] has of making her voice merge into indistinguishability with the surging instrumentation in the chorus, the way she sings the title phrase with an ache in her voice, that's at once urgent and playful." Matthew Jacobs from The Huffington Post ranked the song 22 on their list of "The Definitive Ranking Of Madonna Singles". Medium's Richard LaBeau called it a "bold, clever and interesting bridge between the Ray of Light and Music eras". In March 2023, Billboard ranked the song as Madonna's 88th greatest ever, with Andrew Unterberger writing: "Madonna's still in too reflective a mindset to go full incense and peppermints with it, but she's game enough to meet Orbit's woozy reverb-soaked groove..."

Louis Virtel, from TheBacklot.com, placed "Beautiful Stranger" at number 36 of his list "The 100 Greatest Madonna Songs"; he felt that "Orbit's psychedelic styling suit Madonna's groovy wistfulness perfectly". Author Phil Dellio wrote in his book Interrupting My Train of Thought that although "Beautiful Stranger" had similarities to Madonna's own "Ray of Light" (1998), it had "better melody, better vocal, better light show. It's about the trippiest, most propulsive above-ground dance music since the first two minutes of Led Zeppelin's 'How Many More Times'." J. Randy Taraborrelli wrote in Madonna: An Intimate Biography that Madonna's 2000 song "Amazing", from her eighth studio album Music sounded like a cousin to "Beautiful Stranger" with its inspired composition. While ranking Madonna's singles, in honor of her 60th birthday, The Guardian's Jude Rogers placed "Beautiful Stranger" at number 34, calling it a "gorgeously slinky, impish love song". In a list of the "99 Best Songs of 1999", Rolling Stone writer Rob Sheffield placed the track at number 27 and praised it for being "the most shagadelic disco hit by a megastar shimmying into the big 4-0", adding that "Madonna has never sounded so loose, so lithe, so funny". The song received a Grammy Award at the 42nd ceremony, in the category of Best Song Written for Visual Media. It was also nominated in the category of Best Female Pop Vocal Performance. It was also nominated for a Golden Globe award for Best Original Song, but lost to Phil Collins's "You'll Be in My Heart". At the 2000 ASCAP Pop Awards it was awarded the Most Performed Song. It also won the Ivor Novello Award for Most Performed Work, while also being nominated for Best Contemporary Song. The 1999 MTV Europe Music Awards also nominated the track in the category of Best Song. "Beautiful Stranger" was nominated as Favorite Song From a Movie at the 1999 Nickelodeon Kids' Choice Awards.

== Chart performance ==
In the United States, "Beautiful Stranger" debuted on the Billboard Hot 100 at number 78 on June 12, 1999. It was Madonna's first soundtrack single to chart on the Hot 100 since her rendition of "Don't Cry for Me Argentina" reached number eight in March 1997. "Beautiful Stranger" also debuted at number 28 on the Mainstream Top 40 chart. It gradually climbed up the Hot 100 and peaked at number 19 on July 13, 1999, on the strength of radio airplay only. Promis said that the relative low placement was due to the CD singles not being released. "Beautiful Stranger" was successful on the Billboard Dance Club Play chart, reaching number one. It placed at number 31 on the year-end ranking for the Dance Club Play chart in 1999. In Canada, "Beautiful Stranger" was able to top both the RPM 100 Hit Tracks and Adult Contemporary charts, while also reaching a peak of number four on the Dance 30 chart. While the song was commercially released in Canada, it was ineligible to chart on the Canadian Singles Chart as Warner did not submit the necessary barcode information to Nielsen SoundScan.

In Australia, "Beautiful Stranger" debuted at number eight on the ARIA Singles Chart and reached its peak of number five the next week, staying there for two weeks in total. It gradually descended down the charts, present within the top 50 for a total of 16 weeks. It was certified gold by the Australian Recording Industry Association (ARIA) for shipment of 35,000 copies of the single. On the year end tabulation, the song ranked at number 34. In New Zealand, "Beautiful Stranger" debuted at its peak position of number five. The single gradually descended down the chart and was present for a total of 14 weeks.

In the United Kingdom, the song debuted at its peak of number two on the UK Singles Chart with first-week sales of over 135,000 copies. The song spent 16 weeks on the singles chart, with seven of those being within the top 20. "Beautiful Stranger" also became one of the most played songs on UK radio, receiving over 2,462 plays per week, breaking the previous record held by Cher with her single "Believe". According to the Official Charts Company, the song has sold 535,000 copies in the United Kingdom as of August 2016 and was certified gold by the British Phonographic Industry (BPI). Across Europe, "Beautiful Stranger" reached the top 20 of the charts in Austria, Belgium, Denmark, France, Germany, Ireland, Netherlands, Norway, Scotland, Spain, Sweden and Switzerland, while reaching the top of the charts in Finland and Italy. It received a silver certification in France for shipment of 125,000 copies. The song reached a peak of number two on the European Hot 100 Singles chart, also ranking number two in the 1999 year-end tabulation behind Britney Spears' "...Baby One More Time".

== Music video ==
Madonna and Austin Powers (Mike Myers) are shown in various scenes in the "Beautiful Stranger" video.

The song's accompanying music video was directed by Brett Ratner and filmed at Universal Studios in Los Angeles on May 1, 1999. Madonna had previously shown interest in working with Ratner after seeing his video for D'Angelo's "Brown Sugar" (1995). Her make-up was done by Kevyn Aucoin, with whom she had previously worked on her music video for "The Power of Good-Bye". According to Ratner, it was a rather jovial shooting:

Mike was in character the entire time. He and Madonna really had a great chemistry together. This video shows her absolutely hysterical sense of humour, and it's great for everyone to see that side of her. This was by far the most fun I've ever had making a video.

The video begins with Myers as Austin Powers, receiving a call from his boss Basil Exposition (Michael York), who warns him against a dangerous spy describing her as a "master of disguise". The screen of his car depicts five images of Madonna wearing different looks, and Exposition clarifies that she has been "seducing our top agents". He also warns Powers "whatever you do don't fall in love. We've already lost 007 and 008". As the video continues, Powers finds Madonna at a club performing in front of a crowd, which includes Verne Troyer in character as Mini-Me. As he watches her perform, Powers finds himself fantasizing about the two of them dancing in front of a white background with psychedelic fluorescent whirls. He also imagines her in the passenger seat of his car, where she playfully teases him whilst he is driving through London at night.

According to Ratner, Myers was not comfortable with these scenes, as he felt it was too sexual and inappropriate; he even asked him to cut that particular shot. Madonna on the other hand, thought it was fun and convinced the director to keep it. The video ends with Powers' car fantasy, with Powers telling Madonna “You’re going the right way for a smackbottom”, to which Madonna replies “I hope so”. Author Georges Claude Guilbert wrote in his book, Madonna as Postmodern Myth, that "Beautiful Stranger" denoted one of the series of looks reinvented by Madonna around that time, and was a "radical" change from the geisha look of her previous video for "Nothing Really Matters", released the same year. Matthew Rettenmund wrote in his Encyclopedia Madonnica that "Madonna probably gave very little thought [behind the video]" but he felt that it was better than being a "couple of steps above a clips compilation".

At the 1999 MTV Video Music Awards, the video was nominated in the categories of Best Female Video and Best Cinematography, and won for Best Video from a Film. It also received a nomination for Best Pop Clip of the Year at the 1999 Billboard Music Video Awards. The clip won Best Cinematography and Best Make-Up at the 2000 MVPA Awards; it was also nominated for Soundtrack Video of the Year. At the 1999 VH1 Fashion Awards, the video received a nomination in the category of Most Stylish Video. The video can be found on the Madonna compilations, The Video Collection 93:99 (1999) and Celebration: The Video Collection (2009).

== Live performances and covers ==
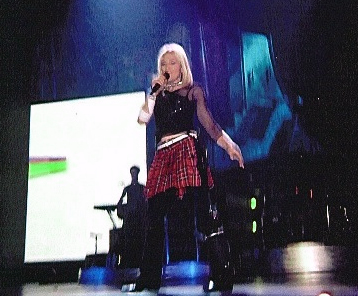
Madonna performing "Beautiful Stranger" during the Drowned World Tour in 2001

Madonna performed "Beautiful Stranger" on her 2001 Drowned World Tour, where it was the fourth song on the setlist. It began with an introduction by Myers as Austin Powers on the video screens, the singer then asked the crowd "Do I make you horny?" (one of Powers' catchphrases) before performing the song. She was joined by backup singers Niki Haris and Donna DeLory, who also contributed with background vocals on the track. Costumes for the performance included spiked dog collars, Swarovski crystal-encrusted bracelets and tattered tops; Madonna herself wore a sleeveless black top, crossover top with one net sleeve, jeans with zips and bondage straps and a tartan kilt. The backdrop during the performance displayed scenes from the movie and psychedelic fluorescent whirls. It also featured a lost technician at the end and elements of "Soul Bossa Nova (Dim's Space-A-Nova)", another song from the film's soundtrack. On September 15, 2001, the tour's final date, Madonna's then husband Guy Ritchie joined her onstage as the lost technician. Michael Hubbard from MusicOMH noted that "things quickly hotted up with [...] 'Beautiful Stranger'". The performance on August 26, 2001, at The Palace of Auburn Hills, outside of Madonna's hometown of Detroit was recorded and released in the live video album, Drowned World Tour 2001.

On October 26, 2008, Madonna performed a snippet of "Beautiful Stranger" as the request song during the Chicago stop of her Sticky & Sweet Tour. An a cappella version of the song was also performed during the Nashville stop of her Rebel Heart Tour in January 2016. In December 2016, Madonna performed "Beautiful Stranger" during her Tears of a Clown show as part of a benefit dinner for her charity, Raising Malawi, at Miami, Florida.

Jon Auer, co-founder of the American power pop band The Posies, recorded a cover of the song on his 2001 solo EP 6 ½. Website Stereogum listed the cover at number five on their list of The 20 Best Indie Rock Madonna Covers. A 2007 folk music tribute compilation to Madonna, entitled Through the Wilderness, features a cover of the song by Golden Animals. Australian rock band DMA's covered the song during their BBC Radio 1 sessions with Annie Mac on March 8, 2016. Michelle Geslani from Consequence of Sound website praised the cover saying that it would "undoubtedly be hailed as yet another successful entry in DMA's young career" and described the cover as "easily tweaking the swirling, retro number into a psychedelic, arena-ready anthem". Michael Carr from Music Feeds magazine also praised the cover saying "Lending itself surprisingly well to the boys’ shoegazey brit pop treatment, the lads absolutely nail it... To be honest though, they kind of won on song choice alone". American punk band Skating Polly released a cover of the song on the 2020 re-release of their album, The Make It All Show, as one of the bonus tracks. The band had previously covered the song on their 2016 tour.

== Formats and track listings ==
- New Zealand and UK cassette; European 2-track CD single
1. "Beautiful Stranger" (Album Version) – 4:22
2. "Beautiful Stranger" (Calderone Radio Mix) – 4:03
- European and UK 12-inch vinyl; Australian, Canadian, European, Japanese, Malaysian, Mexican, South African and UK CD maxi-single
1. "Beautiful Stranger" (Album Version) – 4:22
2. "Beautiful Stranger" (Calderone Club Mix) – 10:12
3. "Beautiful Stranger" (Calderone Radio Mix) – 4:03
- Digital remix EP (2021)
1. "Beautiful Stranger" (Calderone Club Mix) – 10:12
2. "Beautiful Stranger" (Calderone Dub Mix) – 6:21
3. "Beautiful Stranger" (Calderone Radio Mix) – 4:03
4. "Beautiful Stranger" (New Club Edit) – 5:13
5. "Beautiful Stranger" (William Orbit Radio Edit) – 3:56

== Credits and personnel ==
Credits and personnel are adapted from Beautiful Stranger promo single liner notes.

- Madonna – vocals, songwriter, producer
- William Orbit – songwriter, producer, guitar, keyboards
- Victor Calderone – additional producer, remixer
- Emma Fowler – flute
- Damian LeGassick – keyboards, programming
- Pat McCarthy – engineering
- Mark Endert – engineering
- Dave Chelsea – engineering
- Jeff Gregmay – assistant engineering
- Wassim Zartek – assistant engineering

== Charts ==
=== Weekly charts ===
Weekly chart performance for "Beautiful Stranger"
Chart (1999)	Peak position
Australia (ARIA)	5
Austria (Ö3 Austria Top 40)	14
Brazil International (Crowley Broadcast Analysis)	18
Belgium (Ultratop 50 Flanders)	15
Belgium (Ultratop 50 Wallonia)	12
Canada Top Singles (RPM)	1
Canada Adult Contemporary (RPM)	1
Canada Dance/Urban (RPM)	4
Canada CHR (Nielsen BDS)	3
Czech Republic (ČNS IFPI)	5
Denmark (Tracklisten)	4
European Hot 100 (Music & Media)	2
European Radio Top 50 (Music & Media)	1
Finland (Suomen virallinen lista)	1
France (SNEP)	17
Germany (GfK)	13
Greece (IFPI)	3
Hungary (Mahasz)	2
Iceland (Íslenski Listinn Topp 40)	1
Ireland (IRMA)	3
Italy (FIMI)	1
Italy Airplay (Music & Media)	2
Netherlands (Dutch Top 40)	6
Netherlands (Single Top 100)	6
New Zealand (Recorded Music NZ)	5
Norway (VG-lista)	8
Scottish Singles Sales (Official Charts)	2
Spain (Promusicae)	4
Sweden (Sverigetopplistan)	15
Switzerland (Schweizer Hitparade)	6
UK Singles (Official Charts)	2
UK Dance (Official Charts)	7
US Billboard Hot 100	19
US Adult Contemporary (Billboard)	23
US Adult Pop Airplay (Billboard)	9
US Dance Club Songs (Billboard)	1
US Pop Airplay (Billboard)	8

=== Year-end charts ===
Year-end chart performance for "Beautiful Stranger"
Chart (1999)	Position
Australia (ARIA)	34
Belgium (Ultratop 50 Flanders)	68
Belgium (Ultratop 50 Wallonia)	55
Canada Top Singles (RPM)	14
Canada Adult Contemporary (RPM)	16
Canada Dance/Urban (RPM)	29
European Hot 100 (Music & Media)	45
European Radio Top 100 (Music & Media)	2
France (SNEP)	48
Germany (Media Control)	98
Italy (Musica e dischi)	8
Netherlands (Dutch Top 40)	49
Netherlands (Single Top 100)	54
Romania (Romanian Top 100)	98
Spain (AFYVE)	16
Switzerland (Schweizer Hitparade)	45
UK Singles (OCC)	23
UK Airplay (Music Week)	1
US Dance Club Play (Billboard)	31
US Mainstream Top 40 (Billboard)	47

Chart (2001)	Position
Canada (Nielsen SoundScan)	132

== Certifications and sales ==
Certifications and sales for "Beautiful Stranger"
Region	Certification	Certified units/sales
Australia (ARIA)	Gold	35,000^{^}
Belgium (BRMA)	Gold	25,000^{*}
France (SNEP)	Gold	250,000^{*}
Italy	—	50,000
United Kingdom (BPI)	Platinum	600,000^{‡}
^{*} Sales figures based on certification alone.^{^} Shipments figures based on certification alone.^{‡} Sales+streaming figures based on certification alone.

== Release history ==
Release dates, formats and versions for "Beautiful Stranger"
Region	Date	Format(s)	Version(s)	Label(s)	Ref.
Various	May 19, 1999	Radio airplay	Original	Maverick	
United States	May 25, 1999	Contemporary hit radio	Original	Maverick; Warner	
United States	June 4, 1999	Bright AC; hot AC; modern AC	Original	Maverick; Warner	
United Kingdom	June 7, 1999	12-inch vinyl; cassette; CD	Original; remixes	Maverick	
Japan	July 17, 1999	CD	Original	Maverick; WEA Japan	
Canada	July 20, 1999	CD	Original; remixes	Maverick; Warner	
Various	May 21, 2021	Digital download; streaming	Remixes	Warner	

== See also ==
- List of number-one singles of 1999 (Canada)
- List of number-one singles of 1999 (Finland)
- List of number-one hits of 1999 (Italy)
- List of number-one dance singles of 1999 (U.S.)

== Bibliography ==
- Austerlitz, Saul (2007). Money for Nothing: A History of the Music Video, from the Beatles to the White Stripes. Continuum Publications. ISBN 978-0-8264-1818-0.
- Clerk, Carol (2002). Madonnastyle. Omnibus Press. ISBN 0-7119-8874-9.
- Diamond, Kerry; Aucoin, Kevyn (2004). Kevyn Aucoin a Beautiful Life: The Success, Struggles, and Beauty Secrets of a Legendary Makeup Artist. Simon and Schuster. ISBN 978-0-7432-3583-9.
- Fouz-Hernández, Santiago; Jarman-Ivens, Freya (2004). Madonna's Drowned Worlds. Ashgate Publishing, Ltd. ISBN 0-7546-3372-1.
- Dellio, Phil (2014). Interrupting My Train of Thought. Lulu Publishers. ISBN 978-1-312-49197-7.
- Guilbert, Georges-Claude (2002). Madonna as Postmodern Myth: How One Star's Self-Construction Rewrites Sex, Gender, Hollywood and the American Dream. McFarland. ISBN 0-7864-1408-1.
- Morgan, Michelle (2015). Madonna. Hachette UK. ISBN 978-1-4721-1943-8.
- Rettenmund, Matthew (2016). Encyclopedia Madonnica 20. Boyculture Publications. ISBN 978-0-692-51557-0.
- Rooksby, Rikky (2004). The Complete Guide to the Music of Madonna. Omnibus Press. ISBN 0-7119-9883-3.
- Taraborrelli, J. Randy (2008). Madonna: An Intimate Biography. Simon & Schuster. ISBN 978-1-4165-8346-2.
