= Austin Powers: International Man of Mystery =

1997 film by Jay Roach

- Theatrical release poster
- Directed by: Jay Roach
- Written by: Mike Myers
- Produced by: Suzanne Todd; Demi Moore; Jennifer Todd; Mike Myers
- Starring: Mike Myers; Elizabeth Hurley; Michael York; Robert Wagner; Mindy Sterling; Seth Green; Mimi Rogers
- Cinematography: Peter Deming
- Edited by: Debra Neil-Fisher
- Music by: George S. Clinton
- Production companies: Moving Pictures; Eric's Boy; KC Medien
- Distributed by: New Line Cinema (United States); Capella International (International)
- Release date: May 2, 1997
- Running time: 95 minutes (international); 89 minutes (United States)
- Country: United States
- Language: English
- Budget: $16.5–18 million
- Box office: $67.7 million

Austin Powers: International Man of Mystery (or simply Austin Powers) is a 1997 American spy comedy film directed by Jay Roach and written by Mike Myers. It is the first installment in the Austin Powers film series and stars Myers as both the British spy Austin Powers and his nemesis Dr. Evil, alongside Elizabeth Hurley, Michael York, Robert Wagner, Seth Green and Mindy Sterling. The film is a parody of James Bond films and the Swinging Sixties.

The film follows Austin Powers, a flamboyant secret agent who is cryogenically frozen in the late 1960s and revived in the late 1990s to stop the criminal mastermind Dr. Evil, who has returned to carry out a scheme for global extortion. As Austin adjusts to modern society, he partners with Vanessa Kensington (Hurley) while attempting to thwart Dr. Evil's plans.

Austin Powers: International Man of Mystery was released by New Line Cinema in the United States on May 2, 1997 with Capella International handling international sales. It grossed roughly $67 million worldwide against a production budget of around $16–18 million. Although its initial box office performance was modest in some markets, it later developed a wider audience through home media and word of mouth. The film received generally positive reviews from critics. It was followed by two sequels, Austin Powers: The Spy Who Shagged Me (1999) and Austin Powers in Goldmember (2002).

== Plot ==
In 1967, Austin Powers is a flamboyant British spy, renowned for his charm, style, and embodiment of the era's free-spirited hedonism. Unable to defeat Austin, his nemesis Dr. Evil cryogenically freezes himself, intending to return when free love has waned, and greed and corruption dominate society once more. Austin volunteers to be frozen as well, so he can confront Dr. Evil when he returns.

In 1997, Dr. Evil is revived and discovers that many of the evil schemes he planned, like damaging the ozone layer and fabricating a sexual scandal involving Prince Charles, have already occurred without his involvement. Meanwhile, his lieutenant Number Two has transformed Virtucon, the legitimate front of Dr. Evil's criminal empire, into a multibillion-dollar corporation. Uninterested in business, Dr. Evil threatens to hold the world ransom with nuclear weapons until he is paid $100 billion. He meets his teenage son, Scott, conceived with Dr. Evil's preserved sperm; Scott rejects Dr. Evil's attempts to form a relationship out of anger at his absence.

The British Ministry of Defence revives Austin and assigns agent Vanessa Kensington—daughter of his former spy partner Mrs. Kensington—to help him adjust to the late 1990s. Unlike her mother, who shared an unspoken love with Austin, the no-nonsense Vanessa is unimpressed by Austin's outdated attitude toward casual sex and relationships. However, she is won over by his charm and the two soon develop a romantic connection.

Undercover as a married couple, Austin and Vanessa travel to Las Vegas and encounter Number Two and his secretary, Alotta Fagina. Austin infiltrates Alotta's penthouse and discovers Project Vulcan, Dr. Evil's plan to detonate a nuclear warhead in the Earth's core, which will trigger volcanic eruptions around the world. After learning that Austin had sex with Alotta, Vanessa is upset, and warns him that he will end up alone if he does not adapt to modern values. As Austin catches up on the historic events he has missed, he contemplates his isolation, his friends who have died or outgrown him, and society's disdain for his archaic behavior.

Austin and Vanessa infiltrate Dr. Evil's lair at Virtucon headquarters, but are captured by his henchman, Random Task. Despite the United Nations agreeing to pay Dr. Evil, he continues with his plan. Austin and Vanessa escape, then Vanessa summons reinforcements. Austin encounters Dr. Evil's fembots—irresistibly beautiful female androids with machine guns concealed in their breasts—and destroys them by overloading their systems with a striptease. British forces storm the lair as Austin disables Project Vulcan. He confronts Dr. Evil, who mocks Austin's outdated ideals. Austin retorts that the core value of the late 1960s was freedom—a principle that remains timeless. Activating the lair's self-destruct mechanism, Dr. Evil escapes in a rocket, and Austin and Vanessa evacuate the lair before it explodes. Three months later, Austin and Vanessa are married. During their honeymoon, Random Task attacks, but they subdue him. In a cryogenic chamber aboard his rocket, Dr. Evil vows revenge.

== Cast ==
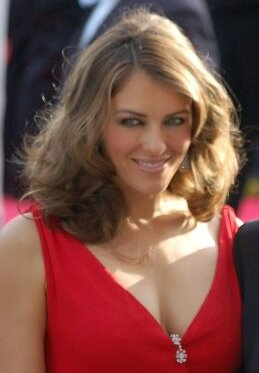
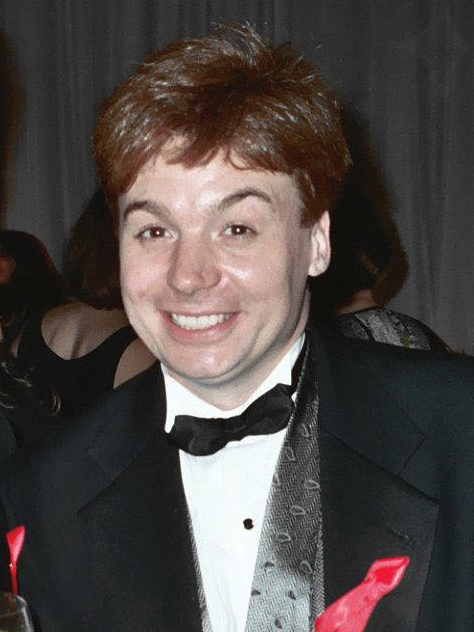
Elizabeth Hurley (pictured in 2007) and Mike Myers (1994)
- Mike Myers as Austin Powers and Dr. Evil
- Elizabeth Hurley as Vanessa Kensington
- Michael York as Basil Exposition
- Mimi Rogers as Mrs. Kensington
- Robert Wagner as Number Two
- Seth Green as Scott Evil
- Fabiana Udenio as Alotta Fagina
- Mindy Sterling as Frau Farbissina
- Joe Son as Random Task
- Paul Dillon as Paddy O'Brien
- Charles Napier as Commander Gilmour

The film also features Will Ferrell as Mustafa, Clint Howard as Johnson Ritter, Elya Baskin as General Borschevsky, and Neil Mullarkey as the quartermaster clerk. Larry Thomas plays a casino dealer and Brian George portrays the United Nations secretary. Carrie Fisher plays a therapist, Mike Hagerty portrays a hotel manager, and Michael McDonald appears as henchman Steve. Cheryl Bartel, Cindy Margolis, Donna W. Scott, Barbara Ann Moore, and Cynthia Lamontagne appear as the fembots. Tom Arnold plays Texan, while Burt Bacharach appears as himself. The United Kingdom release includes additional scenes featuring Lois Chiles as Steve's wife, Christian Slater as a hypnotized guard, Rob Lowe as John's friend (Bill), and Kelly Preston as a Hooters waitress.

== Production ==
=== Inspiration ===
Mike Myers created the character Austin Powers for the faux 1960s rock band Ming Tea that he started with Matthew Sweet and Susanna Hoffs following his Saturday Night Live stint in the early 1990s. Myers said the character and the original film were inspired by British films, music and comedy of the 1960s and 1970s that his father had introduced him to as a child. Myers said that after his father died in 1991, he reflected on the ways his father had influenced him. He explained that Austin was a "tribute" to his father, who had introduced him to James Bond, Peter Sellers, the Beatles, The Goodies, Peter Cook and Dudley Moore. Myers also said hearing the Burt Bacharach song "The Look of Love" (itself from the Peter Sellers Bond parody film Casino Royale) on the radio led to him reminiscing about the 1960s, which helped inspire the movie. Dana Carvey, Myers' collaborator on Saturday Night Live and on the Wayne's World movies, felt that the character of Dr. Evil was copied from Carvey's impression of long-time SNL executive producer Lorne Michaels and was unhappy about it. Myers has denied that Michaels was the inspiration for Dr. Evil, but has said "[t]he Lorne of it is just a little tiny overlay."

=== Casting ===
Myers initially did not intend to play multiple characters in the film, and sought Jim Carrey to play Dr. Evil. Carrey was interested in the role, but had to decline due to scheduling conflicts with Liar Liar (1997). Rhea Perlman turned down the role of Frau Farbissina, while Colin Quinn turned down the role of Scott Evil. Both later expressed regret for declining Austin Powers. Myers cast Robert Wagner and Michael York in supporting roles because of their prominence in late-1960s culture. Myers said Wagner is the "coolest guy" he knows, while York is the "classiest guy" he knows. The popularity of the film revived the careers of both actors.

=== Filming ===
Myers estimated that 30–40% of the film was improvised. Filming locations included Millennium Biltmore Hotel, Riviera Hotel & Casino, and Stardust Resort & Casino on the Las Vegas Strip.

== Reception ==
=== Box office ===
Austin Powers: International Man of Mystery opened on May 2, 1997, to $9.5 million in North American theaters, coming in second that weekend to the thriller film Breakdown, a Paramount release which opened with $12.3 million. In its second weekend, Austin Powers fell to $7 million. Its overall take after it left theaters was $53.8 million domestically and $13.8 million overseas for a worldwide total of $67.8 million, four times the amount of its production budget.

The low grosses in the UK have been partly attributed to the death of Princess Diana, which occurred in August 1997 just prior to the film's UK September release date. The film grew a steady following due to strong word of mouth and its release on VHS and DVD.

=== Critical reception ===
Austin Powers: International Man of Mystery received average to positive reviews. On the review aggregator website Rotten Tomatoes, 72% of 71 critics' reviews are positive. The website's consensus reads: "A light and goofy comedy which provides laughs, largely due to performances and screenwriting by Myers." Metacritic, which uses a weighted average, assigned the film a score of 51 out of 100, based on 25 critics, indicating "mixed or average" reviews. Audiences polled by CinemaScore gave the film an average grade of "B−" on an A+ to F scale.

Roger Ebert of the Chicago Sun-Times praised the film's humor and said it "only gets funnier" if the viewer is familiar with James Bond films and other 1960s films. Andrew Johnston of Time Out New York wrote: "The film's greatest asset is its gentle tone: rejecting the smug cynicism of Naked Gun–style parodies, it never loses the earnest naiveté of the psychedelic era." Malcolm Johnson of the Hartford Courant described Myers as "a gifted comic with a knack for transformation" but criticized Roach for being unable to cut Myers' worst jokes and fully capitalize on his best ones. Austin Powers was ranked No. 42 on Bravo's "100 Funniest Movies of All Time" list.

== Soundtrack ==
Track listing

1. "The Magic Piper (of Love)" by Edwyn Collins
2. "BBC" by Ming Tea
3. "Incense and Peppermints" by Strawberry Alarm Clock
4. "Carnival" by The Cardigans
5. "Mas Que Nada" by Sérgio Mendes & Brasil '66
6. "Female of the Species" (Fembot Mix) by Space
7. "You Showed Me" by The Lightning Seeds
8. "Soul Bossa Nova" by Quincy Jones and His Orchestra
9. "These Days" by Luxury
10. "Austin's Theme" by The James Taylor Quartet
11. "I Touch Myself" by Divinyls
12. "Call Me" by The Mike Flowers Pops
13. "The Look of Love" by Susanna Hoffs
14. "What the World Needs Now Is Love" by Burt Bacharach and The Posies
15. "The Book Lovers" by Broadcast
16. "Austin Powers" by Wondermints
17. "The 'Shag-adelic' Austin Powers Score Medley" by George S. Clinton

There are two notable omissions: "Secret Agent Man", which is played during the attack on Dr. Evil's compound, and "These Boots Are Made for Walkin'", which plays during the Fembot presentation.

Another CD featuring George S. Clinton's scores to the film and its sequel was later released in 2000.

== Home media ==
First released on VHS on October 21, 1997. Austin Powers: International Man of Mystery was released to region 1 double-sided DVD on October 22, 1997, by New Line Home Video, with widescreen and full-screen versions on opposing sides of the disc. It was one of the first movies to be released in the DVD market. The widescreen transfer is unusual in that it is a modified version of the theatrical ratio: despite being filmed in 2.39:1 aspect ratio via Super 35, on DVD it is presented in a Univisium 2:1 ratio, "as specified by the director", according to the disc packaging. The film was featured in the correct theatrical aspect ratio for the first time when it was released on Blu-ray in the Austin Powers Collection. It proved highly successful in the home video market, and was the best-selling video of 1998 in the United States, and the 10th most-rented film of the same year.

All versions of the film released on home video (including VHS) have two alternate endings and a set of deleted scenes, which were then rare to include on VHS. The DVD and Blu-ray versions also feature a commentary. However, all American versions of the film are the 89-minute PG-13 cut, with edits to sexual humor/language. International versions are uncut and 94 minutes long (assuming the correct frame rate).

== Legacy ==
Daniel Craig, who portrayed James Bond on screen from 2006 to 2021, credited the Austin Powers franchise with the relatively serious tone of later Bond films. In a 2014 interview, Craig said, "We had to destroy the myth because Mike Myers fucked us", making it "impossible" to do the gags of earlier Bond films which Austin Powers satirized.

American Film Institute recognition:

- AFI's 100 Years...100 Laughs – Nominated
- AFI's 100 Years...100 Movie Quotes:
  - "Yeah, baby!" – Nominated Quote
  - "One million dollars!" – Nominated Quote
- AFI's 100 Years... 100 Heroes and Villains - Austin Powers - Nominated Hero
- AFI's 100 Years... 100 Heroes and Villains - Dr. Evil - Nominated Villain
