= List of number-one singles of 1999 (Finland) =

This is the list of the number-one singles of the Finnish Singles Chart in 1999.

== Chart history ==
Week	Artist	Title
1	Nightwish	"Sacrament of Wilderness"
2	Nylon Beat	"Viimeinen"
3	The Offspring	"Pretty Fly (For A White Guy)"
4	Nightwish	"Sacrament of Wilderness"
5	Nightwish	"Sacrament of Wilderness"
6	Don Huonot	"Tule sellaisena kuin olet"
7	Don Huonot	"Tule sellaisena kuin olet"
8	Children of Bodom	"Downfall"
9	Children of Bodom	"Downfall"
10	Aikakone	"Anna mun bailaa"
11	Aikakone	"Anna mun bailaa"
12	Aikakone	"Anna mun bailaa"
13	Aikakone	"Anna mun bailaa"
14	Nightwish	"Walking in the Air"
15	Apulanta	"Hallaa"
16	Britney Spears	"...Baby One More Time"
17	Apulanta	"Hallaa"
18	A-Tyyppi featuring Antero Mertaranta	"Ihanaa, Leijonat, ihanaa"
19	A-Tyyppi featuring Antero Mertaranta	"Ihanaa, Leijonat, ihanaa"
20	A-Tyyppi featuring Antero Mertaranta	"Ihanaa, Leijonat, ihanaa"
21	Mr. Oizo	"Flat Beat"
22	Mr. Oizo	"Flat Beat"
23	Aikakone	"Anna mun bailaa"
24	Aikakone	"Anna mun bailaa"
25	Aikakone	"Anna mun bailaa"
26	Madonna	"Beautiful Stranger"
27	Aikakone	"Anna mun bailaa"
28	Madonna	"Beautiful Stranger"
29	Jennifer Lopez	"If You Had My Love"
30	Lou Bega	"Mambo No. 5"
31	Lou Bega	"Mambo No. 5"
32	Lou Bega	"Mambo No. 5"
33	Lou Bega	"Mambo No. 5"
34	Lou Bega	"Mambo No. 5"
35	Eiffel 65	"Blue (Da Ba Dee)"
36	Eiffel 65	"Blue (Da Ba Dee)"
37	Eiffel 65	"Blue (Da Ba Dee)"
38	Eiffel 65	"Blue (Da Ba Dee)"
39	Eiffel 65	"Blue (Da Ba Dee)"
40	Eiffel 65	"Blue (Da Ba Dee)"
41	Eiffel 65	"Blue (Da Ba Dee)"
42	Apulanta & Don Huonot	"Torremolinos 2000"
43	Apulanta & Don Huonot	"Torremolinos 2000"
44	Apulanta & Don Huonot	"Torremolinos 2000"
45	Apulanta & Don Huonot	"Torremolinos 2000"
46	Apulanta & Don Huonot	"Torremolinos 2000"
47	Apulanta & Don Huonot	"Torremolinos 2000"
48	HIM	"Join Me in Death"
49	Apulanta	"Käännä se pois"
50	Apulanta	"Käännä se pois"
51	HIM	"Join Me in Death"
52	HIM	"Join Me in Death"
