= Mini-Me =

Character in the Austin Powers films

- Austin Powers character
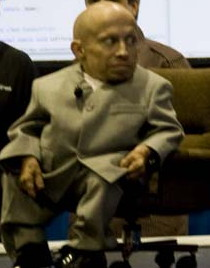
- Photo of Mini-Me's actor, Verne Troyer
- First appearance: Austin Powers: The Spy Who Shagged Me (1999)
- Last appearance: Austin Powers in Goldmember (2002)
- Created by: Mike Myers; Michael McCullers
- Based on: Nick Nack (The Man with the Golden Gun); Majal (The Island of Dr. Moreau)
- Portrayed by: Verne Troyer; Danny DeVito (in Austinpussy)

In-universe information
- Alias: Mini-Austin
- Nickname: My Special Boy
- Species: Human clone
- Gender: Male
- Family: Dr. Evil (parent organism/surrogate father); Scott Evil (surrogate brother); Frau Farbissina (surrogate mother)

Mini-Me is a fictional character from the Austin Powers film franchise, portrayed by Verne Troyer. He debuts in the second film in the trilogy, Austin Powers: The Spy Who Shagged Me, and appears again in the third film, Austin Powers in Goldmember.

== History ==
Before Dr. Evil was sent back in time to 1969, his minions made him a clone. The clone was similar in every manner although he was one-eighth his size (although Mini-Me is approximately one-third Dr. Evil’s size). Upon being introduced to his clone, Dr. Evil immediately declared, "Breathtaking. I shall call him... Mini-Me."

Mini-Me has almost no spoken dialogue in the films beyond an occasional frightened "Eeeee!". Otherwise, he is silent except for when he does his evil laugh with Dr. Evil. He also likes to lip sync the occasional line when Dr. Evil raps. At the beginning of Goldmember, Dr. Evil asks him to "Use your words like a big boy clone!". At one point, he asks Dr. Evil to hug him after meeting Fat Bastard, who wants to eat him. Mini-Me often uses the middle finger as a means of insulting someone (even though he only uses it once during the third movie). On most other occasions, Mini-Me prefers to express himself through written notes.

Mini-Me has a pet called Mini-Mr. Bigglesworth, which has only appeared once in the series, in which Mini-Me tried to gnaw on his ear. Mini Mr. Bigglesworth is a kitten version of Dr. Evil's cat. Mini-Me loves chocolate and disrespecting Scott Evil, Dr. Evil's son and his rival for affection. He is sometimes referred to and treated as a dog or other small objects. Scott refers to him as "That vicious little... Chihuahua thing", and Dr. Evil illustrates him like a small carry-on luggage, as "he fits easily into most overhead storage bins". Austin says upon Mini-Me being knocked out, "Poor little bugger... he's like a dog or something." In the third movie's opening scenes, Dr. Evil uses a leash to restrain Mini-Me from attacking Scott, saying, "Heel, Mini-Me! Heel!" He also tends to dry hump random things. Nigel Powers, upon seeing him, says "Blimey, I thought I smelled cabbage," thinking he is a carny (referring back to a quip from the first Austin Powers movie). Mini-Me is appropriately confused by the remark.

Despite his small size, Mini-Me is a powerful and effective fighter, once giving Austin Powers a considerable thrashing, until the spy took advantage of his small size and flushed him out into space through a toilet. Despite being a clone of Dr. Evil, Mini-Me is shown to be far stronger and tougher than his larger counterpart, as seen in Goldmember when they're lifting weights in prison. He was also given a significant beating in Goldmember, in which he was tied in a pillowcase by Powers and slammed through shelves and glass tables, only to stand up without a scratch.

A memorable gag had him passing a series of notes to Foxxy Cleopatra, first stating she was so beautiful, she must be the clone of an angel. When she smilingly disagreed, the second note asked if she was sure she didn't have a little clone in her. The third asked if she'd like to. As seen by Nigel Powers' reaction to Mini-Me's genitals ("My Word! You're a tripod!" and "If you ever get tired, you can use it as a kickstand"), he seems to have a large penis. He uses this as an advantage at the end of Goldmember when he gets Britney Spears' cell phone number.

== History of appearances ==
He debuts in the second film in the trilogy, Austin Powers: The Spy Who Shagged Me, and appears again in the third film, Austin Powers in Goldmember.

In Austinpussy, the film within a film in Goldmember, the role is played in cameo by Danny DeVito.

Mini-Me has a brief cameo in the music video for Madonna's song, "Beautiful Stranger".

In Space Jam: A New Legacy, where Looney Tunes characters have scattered to different digital worlds based on Warner Bros. films, Elmer Fudd takes on the role of Mini-Me in the Austin Powers world, while Sylvester the Cat has become Mr. Bigglesworth.

== Inspiration ==
Mike Myers has acknowledged that the character was directly inspired by the character of Majai in the 1996 film The Island of Dr. Moreau, who is similarly a miniature version of Marlon Brando's character Dr. Moreau.

== Reception ==
Mini-me is Troyer's best-known character. He is remembered as a silent role. After the actor's suicide, a column in The Guardian wrote that Mini-me had caused a lot of harm to people with dwarfism.

Although the character was supposed to die in the first film, spectators present at a test-screen complained so much about that part of the plot that the producers decided to change his fate.

== In popular culture ==
In 2021, the Hungarian government party Fidesz released an ad based on Mini-Me's introduction scene. The ad's aim was to emphasize the alleged similarities between opposition candidate Péter Márki-Zay (Mini-Me) and former prime minister Ferenc Gyurcsány (Dr. Evil).
