= Fat Bastard =

Character in Austin Powers films

- Austin Powers character
- Mike Myers as Fat Bastard in Austin Powers in Goldmember (2002)
- First appearance: Austin Powers: The Spy Who Shagged Me (1999)
- Last appearance: Austin Powers in Goldmember (2002)
- Created by: Mike Myers; Michael McCullers
- Portrayed by: Mike Myers

In-universe information
- Species: Human
- Gender: Male
- Occupation: Henchman; Sumo wrestler
- Affiliation: British Army: Scots Guards
- Nationality: Scottish

Fat Bastard is a fictional character appearing in the second and third films of the Austin Powers series: Austin Powers: The Spy Who Shagged Me and Austin Powers in Goldmember. A morbidly obese henchman hailing from Clydebank, Scotland, Fat Bastard serves Dr. Evil in his quest to destroy Austin Powers. The character is portrayed by series creator Mike Myers.

Fat Bastard is noted for his foul temper, his emotional monologues that culminate in flatulence, his vulgar, crude manners, and his unusual diet. These go as far as to include a cannibalistic taste for human infants and people with dwarfism, whom he calls "the other, other white meat." In Austin Powers: The Spy Who Shagged Me, he boasts that he once ate a baby and tries to refuse Dr. Evil's money for his services in exchange for getting to eat Mini-Me. Despite this, his extreme size and weight (1 tonne, according to Dr. Evil) endow him with massive strength. He exhibits his physical prowess while working as a sumo wrestler in Goldmember.

Fat Bastard speaks with a thick Scottish accent, which Myers based on his Scottish family members. Myers had previously used the same Scottish accent to portray Charlie Mackenzie in So I Married an Axe Murderer, and would later use a similar voice to portray Shrek in the Shrek franchise.

The character employs many tropes associated with negative stereotypes of fat people, namely that they are greedy, obsessed with eating, possibly cannibalistic, and grotesque.

== Appearances ==
=== Austin Powers: The Spy Who Shagged Me ===
Fat Bastard had stolen Austin's mojo in 1969, as he is a guard in the facility and has knocked out the other guards using bagpipes that spray gas, leaving Austin impotent in 1999. After seducing and sleeping with Fat Bastard, secret agent—and Austin's ally—Felicity Shagwell (Heather Graham) places a homing device in his rectum. During this time with Felicity, Fat Bastard is also eating a whole chicken while in bed with her. However, the device is ineffective, lost and left in a toilet before he returns to Dr. Evil's island. However, traces of rare vegetables are found in a stool sample, enabling the island to be tracked down. Fat Bastard often declares himself "dead sexy," but he is really hiding his true feelings of rejection from society. During an assassination attempt against Austin and Felicity in 1999, Fat Bastard dresses as a package delivery man and literally breaks in through the front door. When Felicity asks if he is happy, Fat Bastard has an emotional breakdown, tearfully confessing, "I eat because I'm unhappy, and I'm unhappy because I eat. It's a vicious cycle. Now if you'll excuse me, there's someone I need to get in touch with and forgive. Myself." He then farts, which makes Austin and Felicity disgusted. Fat Bastard is slightly embarrassed and says, "Sorry, I farted. It's a long road ahead." He then changes his mind and decides to kill them both anyway. Before he can, Felicity incapacitates him by kicking him in the genitals. He groans and calls his scrotum "the mommy daddy button"; she tells him she did it for insulting her sexual prowess, and he faints, shaking the whole room in the process.

=== Austin Powers in Goldmember ===
In the next film, Fat Bastard retires from being a henchman and moves to Japan. There, he becomes a sumo wrestler, and despite trying to go straight, he still carries out the occasional job for Dr. Evil. During his bathroom time, Foxxy Cleopatra and Austin sneak in using a disguise and catch him. Austin starts shouting to him, "You really are a Fat Bastard"; to which he replies, "You know that hurts my feelings. I've tried going on a diet, you know." Fat Bastard then says he did the Zone diet, stating that "carbs are the enemy," though the Zone diet promotes equal amounts of carbs and protein, and Fat Bastard probably meant the Atkins diet, which emphasizes low carbs. After tearfully telling Austin and Foxxy that he's happy as a sumo wrestler, he farts. Austin asks him if he soiled himself. Fat Bastard replies, "maybe" and laughs. He then jokes about how it sounded wet and smells it. He is disgusted by how it smells, stating it smells like "Carrots and throw-up."

By the end of Austin Powers in Goldmember, he has lost his excessive weight, crediting it to the Subway diet and citing Jared Fogle as a hero. However, he points out that he still has a lot of excess skin and further notes that his neck resembles a vagina. In the film audio commentary, Mike Myers states that Fat Bastard will probably not remain thin (as he called him, "Thin Bastard") and will most likely return to his overweight state.

== Censorship ==
In newspaper reviews of the movie, film critic Roger Ebert referred to him as "We can't even say his name!" while others called him "Obese Illegitimate Child."

The mass-retail action figures sold of the character had the name "Fat Man" on the box, even though the patch on his blazer clearly displayed "FB." Specialty stores, such as comic book shops, had figures in packaging that referred to him as "Fat Bastard," however.
