= Frau Farbissina =

Character in the Austin Powers film series

- Austin Powers character
- Mindy Sterling as Frau Farbissina
- First appearance: Austin Powers: International Man of Mystery (1997)
- Last appearance: Austin Powers in Goldmember (2002)
- Created by: Mike Myers
- Portrayed by: Mindy Sterling

In-universe information
- Gender: Female
- Occupation: Attack and defense specialist, Founder of the militant wing of The Salvation Army, Henchwoman
- Significant others: Dr. Evil; Una Brau
- Children: Scott Evil
- Nationality: German

Frau Farbissina is a fictional character played by Mindy Sterling in the Austin Powers film series.

Farbissina is a German attack and defense specialist and the founder of "the militant wing of the Salvation Army". She is also Dr. Evil's henchwoman and tries to help in his schemes to terrorize and take over the world. She has a heavy German accent, and a running gag sees her shout her orders needlessly loudly, often startling Dr. Evil. For her performances, Sterling was nominated for Favorite Supporting Actress in a Comedy at the BMI Film & TV Awards.

== Biography ==
=== Characterization ===
Frau Farbissina's look and demeanour are parodies of several female villains from early James Bond films, namely From Russia with Love's Rosa Klebb (played by Lotte Lenya), On Her Majesty's Secret Service's Irma Bunt (played by Ilse Steppat), and particularly the character of Frau Hoffner (played by Anna Quayle) in the 1967 Bond spoof Casino Royale. In Mike Myers' book Canada, he states that Frau Farbissina was a mixture of Rosa Klebb and Lotta Hitschmanova, who appeared in commercials for the Unitarian Service Committee of Canada on weekend mornings.

Farbissina asserts that she would eventually like to get out of the criminal mastermind business and open a boarding school for girls. This is another reference to Quayle's "Frau Hoffner" role in Casino Royale in which Hoffner heads an international spy school in East Berlin known as the "Mata Hari School of Dancing", where she boards and trains young women to be agents for both sides of the Cold War.

==== Surname ====
Her surname derives from the Yiddish word farbissen, meaning "embittered"; a farbissiner is an angry, bitter, vocal (male) person, while farbissina is the corresponding female form.

=== Background ===
She has a heavy German accent; in the German dubbed versions of the films, she speaks with an Upper Saxon dialect. In Comedy Central's Canned Ham: The Doctor Evil Story, a half-hour-long preview special of The Spy Who Shagged Me, Dr. Evil states that he met Farbissina "at gymnasia in Baden-Baden at a street corner next to the McDonald's."

=== Austin Powers: International Man of Mystery ===
Farbissina participates in helping Dr. Evil hijack a nuclear warhead and hold the world hostage. It is revealed that Farbissina used a sample of Evil's semen just a couple of years after Dr. Evil's cryostasis to artificially create his son, Scott Evil (played by Seth Green), now a Generation X young adult. Scott is resentful of his father, but close to Farbissina, the only one who cares about his wellbeing. In the first film, Dr. Evil is about to press a button that would kill Scott for his insolence by burning him alive, but Farbissina swats his hand away, then winks at Scott.

=== The Spy Who Shagged Me ===
The second film jumps from the 1990s to the 1960s due to time travel. Frau Farbissina looks exactly the same in the 1960s as she did in the 1990s, which was used for comedic effect in the film.

In the present, she states that she is homosexual and is in a relationship with Una Brau, a woman she met on a golf tour. However, when Dr. Evil goes back in time, after imbibing some of Austin Powers' mojo, he has sex with Farbissina. This leads to an uncomfortable morning-after encounter and Farbissina swearing she will never love another man. It is also revealed that Scott was not the result of artificial creation from Dr. Evil's frozen sperm, but was naturally conceived as a result of the sexual encounter.

In the closing credits, Scott Evil is on The Jerry Springer Show again in which he learns that Farbissina is his mother. She says she never told him because she did not want him to be hurt. He forgives her and they embrace.

=== Goldmember ===
Frau Farbissina is still helping Dr. Evil with his evil schemes. Farbissina and Dr. Evil also kiss while he is in prison; although the two enjoy it (despite her having been established as a lesbian in the previous movie), the purpose was to transfer a key to Dr. Evil so that he could escape. Once her son Scott begins to become evil, she shows that she is very proud.

== Reception and legacy ==
The character is described as striking and memorable and as the actress's best known role. She appeared in a Super Bowl advertising in 2022.
