= Mindy Sterling =

American actress (born 1953)

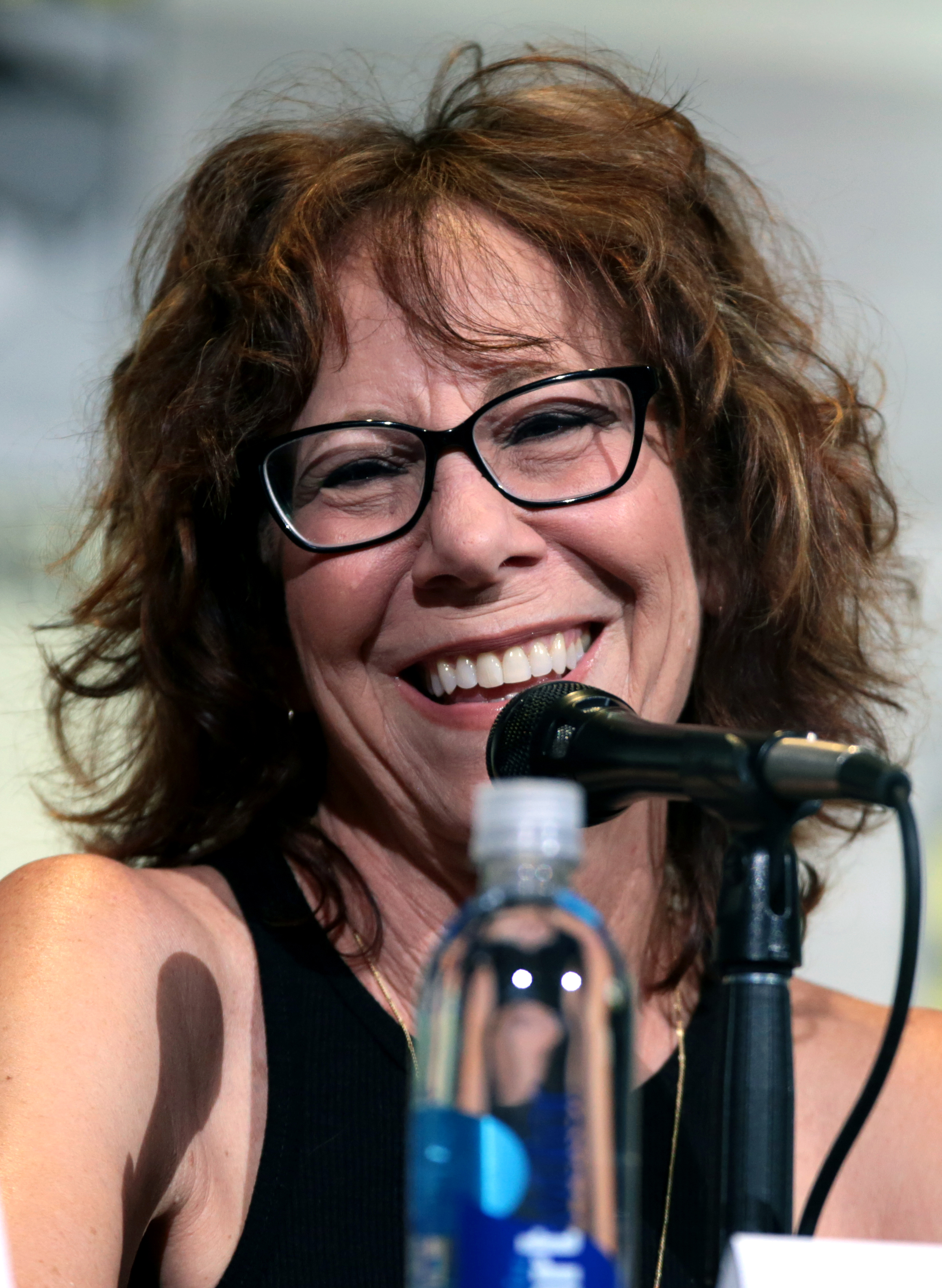
- Sterling at the 2016 San Diego Comic-Con
- Born: Mindy Lee Sterling; July 11, 1953 (age 73); Paterson, New Jersey, U.S.
- Occupation: Actress
- Years active: 1973–present
- Spouse: Brian Gadson (divorced)
- Children: 1

Mindy Lee Sterling (born July 11, 1953) is an American actress. She is primarily known as a character actress who has amassed multiple live action and voice-over credits across film and television. Her accolades include nominations for two Primetime Emmy Awards.

In film, Sterling played Frau Farbissina in the Austin Powers series (1997–2002) and appeared in Drop Dead Gorgeous (1999), How the Grinch Stole Christmas (2000), All About Nina (2018), and Bobcat Moretti (2023). On television, she played Francine Briggs on the Nickelodeon series iCarly (2007–2012), Mitzi Kinsky on the ABC series Desperate Housewives (2010–2011), Susan Skidmore on the Disney Channel series A.N.T. Farm (2011–2013), Bobbie on the Vimeo series Con Man (2015–2017), and Linda Schwartz on the ABC series The Goldbergs (2017–2023).

Sterling provided the voice of Endive on the Cartoon Network series Chowder (2007–2010), Lin Beifong on the Nickelodeon series The Legend of Korra (2012–2014), and Morgana in the Nickelodeon version of Winx Club (2012). She has also done voice-over work for Alpha and Omega (2010), Monsters University (2013), Despicable Me 3 (2017), and The Grinch (2018).

== Early life and education ==
Sterling was born into a Jewish family in Paterson, New Jersey, on July 11, 1953. Her father Dick Sterling was an actor and nightclub comedian who collaborated with Shecky Greene and Sammy Shore, and her mother Florence Adele "Bookie" Sterling (née Pushkin) was a dancer. She has one brother, Mark Sterling. Sterling grew up in Miami.

As a child, she was terribly shy so she took drama in high school to "get out of my insecurity and my shell". She was in several plays throughout high school. She graduated from Miami Norland Senior High School in 1972 and earned a degree in acting at Miami Dade College.

== Career ==
Around 1973, Sterling landed a recurring role on the syndicated children's series Dusty's Treehouse. She later joined the L.A.-based comedy troupe The Groundlings in the 1980s. From 1990 to 1991, she was one of the comedians in the satirical show On the Television. Despite having starred in numerous films in the 1980s and 1990s, it was her character Frau Farbissina, the diminutive and domineering Germanic cohort of Dr. Evil (Mike Myers) in Austin Powers: International Man of Mystery (1997), that brought Sterling high praise for her work in films. In 1999, she starred in the sequel Austin Powers: The Spy Who Shagged Me, and also appeared in Drop Dead Gorgeous. She later reprised the character Frau Farbissina in Austin Powers in Goldmember (2002) for the third and final time.

Sterling played one of the townspeople in the 2000 live-action adaptation of How the Grinch Stole Christmas, and also provided additional voices in the 2018 CGI version, The Grinch. Also in 2000, Sterling appeared as a celebrity guest on Hollywood Squares; she returned to the show in 2002. Between 2002 and 2004, Sterling made guest appearances on the Donny Osmond version of the game show Pyramid. In 2004, she was the casting director on the episode "Joey and the Big Audition" of Joey. In 2005, she played Judge Foodie on the Disney show That's So Raven and a volleyball coach on The Suite Life of Zack & Cody in 2006. In 2008, Sterling played Christian Slater's secretary Arlene Scott in the show My Own Worst Enemy.

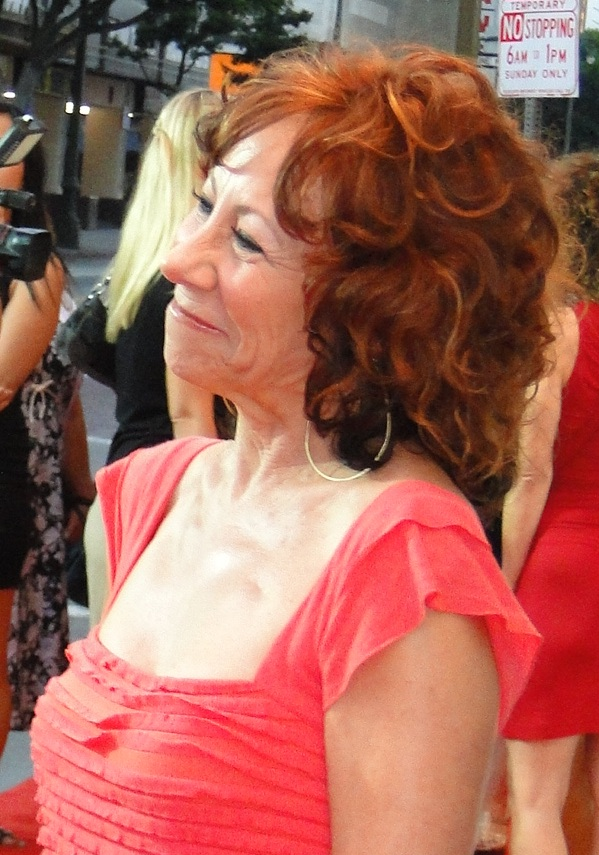
Sterling on the red carpet at the premiere of Cats for Cats at the Orpheum Theatre in Los Angeles (2011)

From 2007 to 2010, Sterling voiced Endive, the main antagonist to Mung Daal in Chowder. She voiced the character Lin Beifong, the second Police Chief of Republic City and daughter of original chief Toph Beifong, in The Legend of Korra. She also had a recurring voice role as Morgana on the Nickelodeon version of Winx Club in 2012. Her many other voice-over credits include guest roles on The Wild Thornberrys, Invader Zim, Ice Age: The Meltdown, American Dragon: Jake Long, Higglytown Heroes, Robot Chicken, Mars Needs Moms, The Looney Tunes Show, Justice League Unlimited, Kick Buttowski: Suburban Daredevil, and Scooby-Doo! Mystery Incorporated.

Sterling has achieved success in teen sitcoms, playing Ms. Francine Briggs on iCarly, and in A.N.T. Farm as Principal Susan Skidmore. In 2010, she had a recurring role as bitter neighbour Mitzi Kinsky in Desperate Housewives. In 2012, she appeared in a book trailer for a parody of The Hunger Games entitled The Hunger Pains. In 2013, she starred as Janice Nugent in the comedy series Legit. In 2018, she appeared in Netflix's A Series of Unfortunate Events. From 2017 to 2023, she appeared on the sitcom The Goldbergs as Linda Schwartz, the mother of Geoff Schwartz. In 2024, Sterling guest starred on the series premiere of St. Denis Medical.

== Personal life ==
Sterling has a son from her previous marriage to Brian Gadson.

In 1998, Sterling was diagnosed with breast cancer after a routine mammogram. After a lumpectomy, chemotherapy, radiation treatment and tamoxifen, she has remained cancer-free.

== Filmography ==
=== Film ===
Year	Title	Role	Notes
1981	The Devil and Max Devlin	Fan #1 at Grammy's	
1985	House	Woman in Bookstore	
1987	The Brave Little Toaster	Rob's mother, Two-Faced Sewing Machine	Voice; credited as Mindy Stern
1994	The Favor	Debbie Rollins	
1995	The Crazysitter		
1995	Man of the Year	Cindee	
1997	Austin Powers: International Man of Mystery	Frau Farbissina	
1997	Road Rules: All Stars	Herself	
1999	Idle Hands	Lady Bowler	
1999	Austin Powers: The Spy Who Shagged Me	Frau Farbissina	
1999	Drop Dead Gorgeous	Iris Clark	
2000	How the Grinch Stole Christmas	Clair Nella Who	
2001	Barstow 2008	Mona Finch	
2001	The Sky Is Falling	Doris	
2001	Totally Blonde	Ramona	
2002	Austin Powers in Goldmember	Frau Farbissina	
2004	EuroTrip	Old Woman in Confessional	Uncredited
2005	The 12 Dogs of Christmas	Mrs. Walsh	
2006	The Enigma with a Stigma	Patricia Riley	
2006	Domestic Import	Bernice Kimmelman	
2006	Ice Age: The Meltdown	Female Ox	Voice
2006	Pro-Choice	Danny's Mother	Short film
2006	The Amazing Screw-On Head	Aggie, Geraldine	Voice
2007	Frank	Monica Loveless	
2007	Reno 911!: Miami	Spoder's Mom	
2007	The Captain	Nedra	Short film
2007	Surf's Up	Doris Flipkitz	Voice, Deleted scenes
2007	Goldfish	Teacher	Short film
2007	Beyond the Pale	Mrs. Plotzkin	
2008	Wieners	Mrs. Applebaum	
2008	Happy Wednesday	Deana Williams	Short film
2008	Extreme Movie	Jane	
2009	Spring Breakdown	Lavonne	
2009	The Big Idea	Iris Pikarski	Short film
2009	Jesus People: The Movie	Claudia	
2010	Alpha and Omega	Debbie	Voice
2011	The Newest Pledge	President Dumervile	
2011	Monster Mutt	Helen	
2011	Mars Needs Moms	The Supervisor	Voice
2011	Transformers: Dark of the Moon	Female Insurance Agent	
2012	Any Day Now	Miss Mills	
2012	The Dog Who Saved the Holidays	Grandma Bannister	Video
2012	Scooby-Doo! Music of the Vampire	Lita Rutland	Voice, direct-to-video
2013	Scooby-Doo! Mask of the Blue Falcon	Caterer	Voice, direct-to-video
2013	Monsters University	Additional Voices	
2014	The Dog Who Saved Easter	Grandma Bannister	Voice, direct-to-video
2015	The Dog Who Saved Summer	Grandma Bannister	Video
2015	Minions	Additional Voices	
2016	The Good Neighbor	Mae	
2017	Despicable Me 3	Additional Voices	
2017	Batman and Harley Quinn	Project Supervisor	Voice
2017	The 60 Yard Line	Linda Zagowski	
2018	Seven Stages to Achieve Eternal Bliss	Beatrice	
2018	All About Nina	Amy	
2018	The Grinch	Additional Voices	
2022	Minions: The Rise of Gru	Additional Voices	
2023	Bobcat Moretti	Jean	
2026	Quarter	Liz	Post-production

=== Television ===
Year	Title	Role	Notes
1986	Perfect Strangers	Hostess	Episode: "First Date"
1990	Working Tra$h	Mary	Television film
1991	On the Television	Various roles	7 episodes
1991	Riders in the Sky	Lois, Stage Mother	2 episodes
1991	Evening Shade	La Wanda	Episode: "The Thanksgiving Show"
1992	The Larry Sanders Show	Writer	3 episodes
1993	Saved by the Bell: The College Years	Clara Meade	2 episodes
1993, 1995	Family Matters	Coach, Woman	2 episodes
1994	Good Advice	Jill	Episode: "Two Times Twenty"
1995	Sister, Sister	Denise's Mom	Episode: "Single White Teenager"
1995	Beyond Family	Mom Zumwalt	Television film
1996	Friends	Wedding Planner	Episode: "The One with Barry and Mindy's Wedding"
1996	Nick Freno: Licensed Teacher	Mrs. Fleckner	Episode: "Some Assembly Required"
1997	Ellen	June Haddassi	Episode: "Makin' Whoopie"
1997	Alright Already	Maxine	Episode: "Again with the Black Box"
2000	The Wild Thornberrys	Lemur #2, Newscaster	Voice, episode: "Bogged Down"
2000	Manhattan, AZ	Lona	Recurring role; 8 episodes
2001	Just Shoot Me!	Mrs. Lubitz	Episode: "The Gift Piggy"
2001	Even Stevens	Ms. Lynch	Episode: "Uncle Chuck"
2002	Invader Zim	Countess von Verminstrasser	Voice, episode: "Lice"
2002	As Told by Ginger	Ms. Powell, Song Leader	Voice, 2 episodes
2002	She Spies	Ylva Gallo	Episode: "The Martini Shot"
2003	Hidden Hills		2 episodes
2003	On the Spot	Fifi	5 episodes
2004	Reno 911!	Mrs. Leonard	2 episodes
2004	Joey	The Casting Director	Episode: "Joey and the Big Audition"
2004	30 Days Until I'm Famous	Lupe Horowitz	Television film
2005	Unfabulous	Superintendent Jackie Bell	Episode: "The Grey Area"
2005	That's So Raven	Judge Foodie	Episode: "Food for Thought"
2005	Cuts	Ms. Fennell	Episode: "Hair Tease"
2005	Justice League Unlimited	Enid Clinton	Voice, 2 episodes
2006	The King of Queens	Sherry	Episode: "Gambling N' Diction"
2006	Lovespring International	Monica	Episode: "The Loser Club"
2006	The Replacements	Scoutleader Susan	Voice, episode: "The Jerky Girls"
2006	The Suite Life of Zack & Cody	Sister Rose	Episode: "Volley Dad"
2006	American Dragon: Jake Long	Pix McGee, Mrs. Grumplestock	Voice, 2 episodes
2006	Haversham Hall	Headmistress Moira Grodnickel	Television film
2006	Come On Over	Grandy	2 episodes
2006	Getting Played	Lydia	Television film
2006–2007	Higglytown Heroes	Aunt Mellie	Voice, recurring role
2007	Curb Your Enthusiasm	Nurse	Episode: "The Bat Mitzvah"
2007	Shredderman Rules	Dr. Sheila Voss	Television film
2007–2008	Tak and the Power of Juju	Chaka Ungataka	Voice, 2 episodes
2007–2010	Chowder	Endive, additional voices	Voice, 49 episodes
2007–2012	iCarly	Miss Francine Briggs	Recurring role; 9 episodes
2008	Scrubs	Mrs. Cropper	Episode: "My Manhood"
2008	My Name Is Earl	Mrs. Zaks	Episode: "The Magic Hour"
2008	Rita Rocks	Mrs. Portman, Towel customer	Episode: "Take This Job and Shove It"
2008	My Own Worst Enemy	Arlene Scott	Recurring role; 5 episodes
2008	Worst Week	Elka	Episode: "The Gift"
2008	Unknown Sender	Doris	Episode: "Spin Cycle"
2009	The Dog Who Saved Christmas	Grandma Bannister	Television film
2010	10 Things I Hate About You	Cosmetics Shopper	Episode: "Too Much Information"
2010	Svetlana	Mama	Episode: "Throw Mama Back on the Plane"
2010	Warren the Ape	Judge	Episode: "Anger Management"
2010	Glory Daze	Ticket Lady	Episode: "What's Love Got to Nude with It"
2010	U.S.S. Alabama	Dr. Lila Corn	Television film
2010	Dick Tracy Special	Bernice	Television film
2010	Lilly's Light	Peaches	Television film
2010	The Dog Who Saved Christmas Vacation	Grandma Bannister	Television film
2010–2011	Desperate Housewives	Mitzi Kinsky	Recurring role; 9 episodes
2010–2012	Kick Buttowski: Suburban Daredevil	Ms. Chicarelli	Voice, 10 episodes
2011	Elvira's Movie Macabre	Ethel, Mistress of Crafts	Episode: "Untamed Women"
2011	The Looney Tunes Show	Beauty School Instructor	Voice, episode: "Beauty School"
2011	The League	Nadia	Episode: "The Out of Towner"
2011	Scooby-Doo! Mystery Incorporated	Dean Fenk, Mom, Abigail Gluck	Voice, 2 episodes
2011	2 Broke Girls	Mrs. Stein	Episode: "And the Very Christmas Thanksgiving"
2011	The Dog Who Saved Halloween	Grandma Bannister	Television film
2011–2013	A.N.T. Farm	Principal Susan Skidmore	Recurring role; 21 episodes
2012	Winx Club (Nickelodeon version)	Morgana	Voice, recurring role
2012	Fish Hooks	Lunchlady Latoada	Voice, episode: "Get a Yob!"
2012–2014	The Legend of Korra	Lin Beifong, additional voices	Voice, recurring role
2013	Incredible Crew	Teacher	Special Guest Role; "Student Dictator" sketch
2013	Legit	Janice Nugent	Recurring role; 14 episodes
2013	Raising Hope	Prosecutor	Episode: "Adoption"
2014	Good Morning Today	Dr. Wilma Frank	Episode: "#1.20"
2014	Kung Fu Panda: Legends of Awesomeness	Master Snow Leopard	Voice, episode: "The First Five"
2014	Franklin & Bash	Irina Tanya	Episode: "Spirits in the Material World"
2014	A to Z	Aunt Jo	Episode: "D Is for Debbie"
2015	Breadwinners	Buhdeuce's Mom	Voice, episode: "Birds of a Feather"
2015	The Soul Man	Ms. Stroman	Episode: "Who Let the Dog In?"
2015	Pig Goat Banana Cricket	Brainy Jane, Brainy Jane's Brain	Voice, episode: "The Tooth of My True Love"
2015	Be Cool, Scooby-Doo!	Lady Pipi Wuthering	Voice, episode: "Party Like It's 1899"
2015	Young & Hungry	Matilda	Episode: "Young & Christmas"
2015	TripTank	Caller, Fisherman Face, Older Woman	Voice, 3 episodes
2015–2017	Black-ish	Pamela	4 episodes
2015–2017	Con Man	Bobbie	Main cast; 16 episodes Web series
2016	Animals.	Psychic Lady	Voice, 2 episodes
2016	The Detour	Bev	Episode: "The Pilot"
2016–2019	Mike Tyson Mysteries	Bitsy Morgan, Miriam Schulwitz	Voice, 2 episodes
2016–2018	The Adventures of Puss in Boots	Miguela	Voice, 3 episodes
2017	Secs & Execs	Shirla	Television film
2017	Voltron: Legendary Defender	Ryner	Voice, 3 episodes
2017	School of Rock	Gloria	Episode: "School of Trust"
2017	Hell's Kitchen	Herself	Guest diner and Leukemia & Lymphoma Society contributor; Episode: "It's All Gravy"
2017	Grace and Frankie	Sally Gaspar	Episode: The Death Stick
2017–2018	The Loud House	Dr. Shuttleworth, Officer Schoffner, Angry Driver #1	Voice, Recurring role
2017–2023	The Goldbergs	Linda Schwartz	Recurring role
2018	Hot Streets	Dr. Jane Brainbrook	Episode: "Pilot"
2018	Life in Pieces	Desiree	Episode: "Reading Egg Nurse Neighbor"
2018	One Day at a Time	Delia	Episode: "Citizen Lydia"
2018	A Series of Unfortunate Events	Elder Annabelle	Episode: "The Vile Village"
2018	Nobodies	Deborah Diamond	Episode: "Kristen's Wiig"
2018	Ghosted	Gloria Stevens-Jennifer	Episode: "The Article"
2018–2019	The Epic Tales of Captain Underpants	Mrs. Sneedly	Voice, 3 episodes
2019	Fuller House	Gloria Feinstein	Episode: "Hale's Kitchen"
2020	Raven's Home	Grandma Zo	Episode: "The Story So-fa"
2020	Kipo and the Age of Wonderbeasts	Bev	Voice, episode: "The Goat Cheese Prophecy"
2021	The Shrink Next Door	Mrs. Zicherman	Miniseries, 1 episode
2022	Madagascar: A Little Wild	Thelma the Space Monkey	Voice, episode: "The Final Fur-tier"
2024	St. Denis Medical	Laurie	Episode: "Welcome to St. Denis"
2025	Phineas and Ferb	Veterinarian	Voice, episode: "A Chip to the Vet"
2026	The Legend of Vox Machina	Lusia	Voice, episode: "We Are His Blood"

=== Video games ===
Year	Title	Role	Notes
2004	Spider-Man 2	Aunt May, Female Pedestrian, Scientist	
2004	EverQuest II	Oracle Ulinara, Darmen Sproutmore, Merchant Novak	
2006	Superman Returns	The Citizens of Metropolis	
2016	Con Man: The Game	Bobbie	Mobile game

== Awards and nominations ==
Award	Year	Category	Work	Result	Ref.
Blockbuster Entertainment Awards	2000	Favorite Supporting Actress – Comedy	Austin Powers: The Spy Who Shagged Me	Nominated	
Teen Choice Awards	2000	Choice Movie Chemistry	Austin Powers: The Spy Who Shagged Me	Nominated	
Primetime Emmy Awards	2017	Outstanding Actress in a Short Form Comedy or Drama Series	Con Man	Nominated	
Primetime Emmy Awards	2017	Outstanding Actress in a Short Form Comedy or Drama Series	Sex & Execs	Nominated	
