= Austin Powers in Goldmember =

2002 film by Jay Roach

- Theatrical release poster
- Directed by: Jay Roach
- Written by: Mike Myers; Michael McCullers
- Based on: Characters by Mike Myers
- Produced by: Suzanne Todd; Jennifer Todd; John Lyons; Eric McLeod; Demi Moore; Mike Myers
- Starring: Mike Myers; Beyoncé Knowles; Seth Green; Michael York; Robert Wagner; Mindy Sterling; Verne Troyer; Michael Caine
- Cinematography: Peter Deming
- Edited by: Greg Hayden; Jon Poll
- Music by: George S. Clinton
- Production companies: New Line Cinema; Gratitude International; Team Todd; Moving Pictures
- Distributed by: New Line Cinema
- Release date: July 26, 2002
- Running time: 94 minutes
- Country: United States
- Language: English
- Budget: $63 million
- Box office: $296.9 million

Austin Powers in Goldmember is a 2002 American spy comedy film directed by Jay Roach and written by Mike Myers and Michael McCullers. It is the third (and, to date, most recent) installment in the Austin Powers film series. Myers stars in four different roles alongside Beyoncé Knowles, Seth Green, Michael York, Robert Wagner, Mindy Sterling, Verne Troyer, and Michael Caine. The plot follows the flamboyant British secret agent Austin Powers as he confronts his former nemesis Dr. Evil, partners with fellow agent Foxxy Cleopatra, and encounters the criminal mastermind from the past Goldmember.

Austin Powers in Goldmember was released in the United States on July 26, 2002, by New Line Cinema. It received mixed reviews from critics and grossed $297 million. It was the seventh-highest-grossing film of the year in the U.S. and Canada.

== Plot ==
In 2002, from his lair behind the Hollywood Sign, Dr. Evil unveils to Number 2, Mini-Me, Frau Farbissina, and Scott Evil his plan for world domination: traveling back in time to 1975 and partnering with the Dutch, gold-obsessed Johan van der Smut, who, after losing his genitalia in a smelting accident, is known as "Goldmember". Goldmember developed a power unit for a tractor beam and intends to use it to pull a meteor into the earth. Moments after unveiling this plan, Austin Powers arrests Dr. Evil and Mini-Me. Queen Elizabeth knights Austin for his service, but he is disappointed when his father, the famous spy Nigel Powers, does not attend the ceremony. During an after party, Basil Exposition informs Austin that his father has been kidnapped. Their only clue is that the crew of Nigel's yacht have had their genitalia painted gold.

Austin seeks help from the imprisoned Dr. Evil to find the kidnapper. Dr. Evil antagonizes Austin by reminding him that Nigel was also absent when Austin and Dr. Evil graduated from the British Intelligence Academy. Dr. Evil tells Austin that Goldmember was behind the abduction, and in exchange Austin transfers Dr. Evil to a regular prison so he can be with Mini-Me. Austin travels to 1975 and infiltrates Studio 69, Goldmember's roller disco club in New York City. He is reunited with his former lover, undercover FBI agent Foxxy Cleopatra. Austin locates his father but is unable to rescue him. Goldmember takes Nigel through Dr. Evil's time machine to 2002 and Austin and Foxxy also escape back to 2002. Dr. Evil and Mini-Me instigate a prison riot and escape. Number 3, a British Intelligence mole, informs Austin that Dr. Evil has moved to a new lair near Tokyo.

Austin and Foxxy travel to Tokyo and confront Fat Bastard, who is now a sumo wrestler. Fat Bastard reveals that businessman Mr. Roboto is working on a device for Dr. Evil and Goldmember. Austin and Foxxy meet with Roboto, who pleads ignorance. The duo infiltrate Roboto's factory where the command unit for the tractor beam is being loaded into Goldmember's car. Foxxy confronts Goldmember while Austin attempts to free Nigel. However, Goldmember escapes and flees to Dr. Evil's submarine with the tractor beam. Dr. Evil's son Scott, now interested in taking over the family business, offers his father a gift: a tank of sharks with laser beams attached to their heads. Scott then kills Roboto by feeding him to the sharks. Dr. Evil shows favoritism towards Scott over Mini-Me, which motivates Mini-Me to defect and join Austin and Foxxy.

Austin, Foxxy and Mini-Me infiltrate the submarine, where Austin is captured. Before Dr. Evil can activate the tractor beam, Foxxy steals the key and frees Austin. When Austin prepares to shoot Dr. Evil, Nigel appears and reveals that Austin and Dr. Evil are brothers, and that Dr. Evil's name is actually Dougie. Austin, Doug, Nigel, and Mini-Me embrace in reconciliation, which enrages Scott. Goldmember commandeers the tractor beam's controls, revealing his golden genitalia to be a spare key. He activates the tractor beam, but Austin and Doug work together to reverse its polarity, destroying the meteor and saving the world, which results in Goldmember getting arrested.

The entire story is later adapted into the film Austinpussy. After watching the film in a theater, Austin and Foxxy encounter Fat Bastard, who is now thin but with sagging flesh thanks to the Subway diet. Austin and Foxxy kiss, while Scott, now bald and behaving like his father—declares he will take his revenge against Austin and Doug and take over the world. During the end credits, Mini-Me talks with Britney Spears, who wants to give him her phone number.

== Cast ==
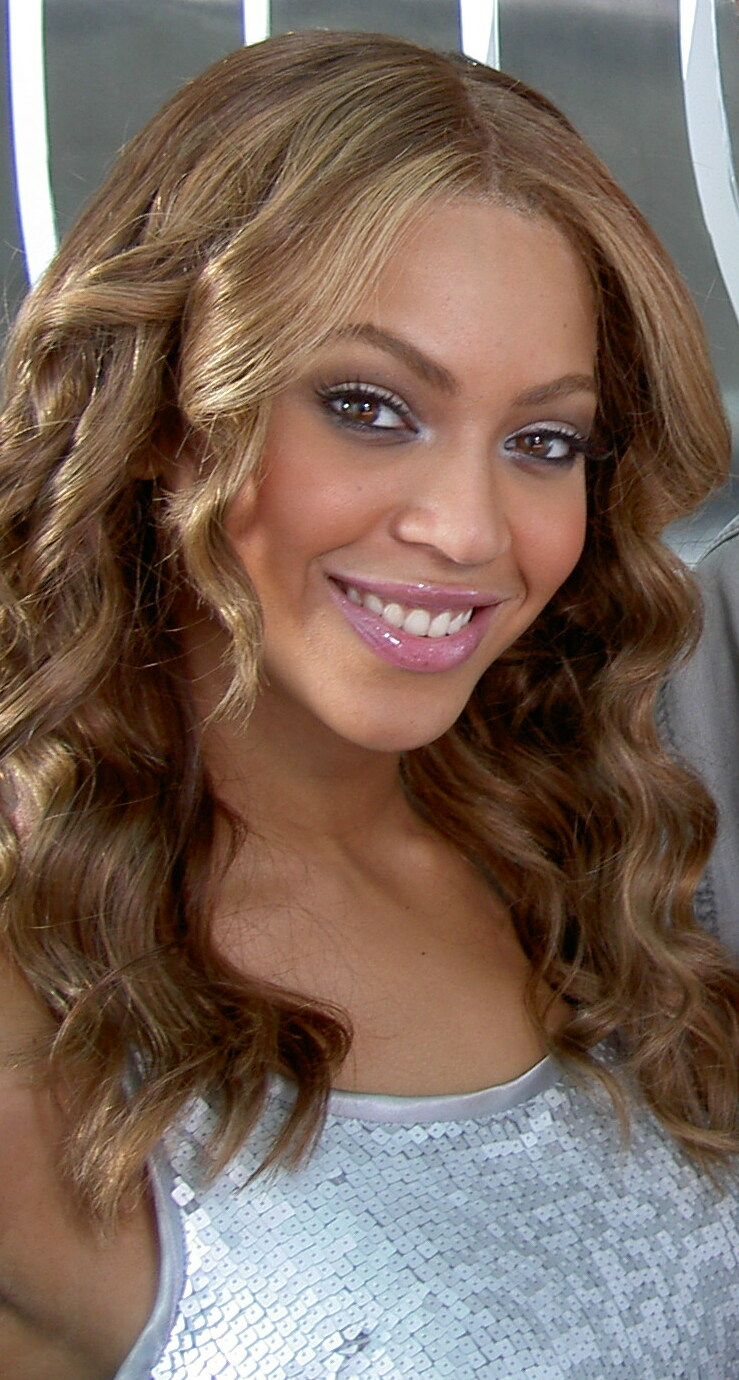
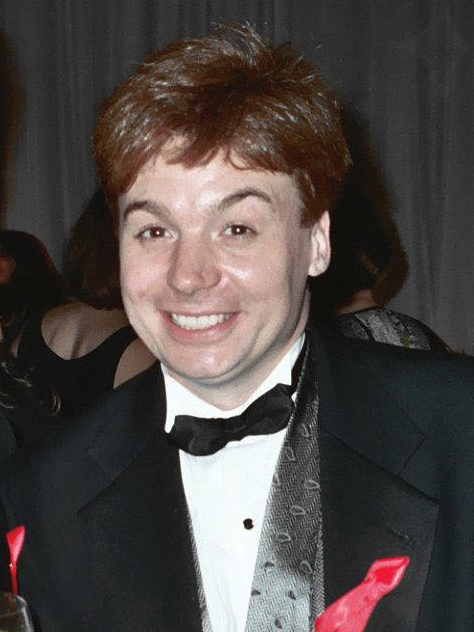
Beyoncé Knowles (pictured in 2004) and Mike Myers (1995)
- Mike Myers as:
  - Austin Powers, a British agent from the late 1960s and Dr. Evil's long lost older twin brother who was frozen for 30 years to stop his brother.
    - Aaron Himelstein as young Austin
  - Dr. Evil, Austin Powers' long-time nemesis who, during the film's climax, is revealed to be his long-lost younger twin brother, Douglas Powers. He then redeems himself and makes amends with his family.
    - Josh Zuckerman as young Evil
  - Goldmember (born Johan van der Smut), a gold-hungry Dutch supervillain who, due to a smelting accident, uses a prosthetic from which he takes his name. A sometime ally of Dr Evil, he is the titular main antagonist of the film.
  - Fat Bastard, an obese Scottish former Ministry of Defence soldier and agent of Dr Evil. Now a sumo wrestler in Japan, he secretly works for Goldmember.
- Beyoncé Knowles as Foxxy Cleopatra, Austin's spy partner
- Michael York as Basil Exposition, Austin's boss
  - Eddie Adams as young Basil Exposition
- Michael Caine as Nigel Powers, a British agent and Austin and Dr. Evil's father
- Robert Wagner as Number 2, Dr. Evil's business-savvy henchman with an eyepatch
  - Rob Lowe as Middle Number 2
  - Evan Farmer as Young Number 2
- Seth Green as Scott Evil, Dr. Evil's son
- Verne Troyer as Mini-Me, Dr. Evil/Doug's dwarf clone who is jealous of Scott.
- Mindy Sterling as Frau Farbissina, Dr. Evil's loud-mouthed henchwoman from Germany.
- Fred Savage as Number Three / Mole
- Brian Tee as Godzilla Pedestrian
- Masi Oka as Godzilla Copyright Pedestrian
- Clint Howard as Radar Operator Johnson Ritter
- Michael McDonald as Royal Guard
- Greg Grunberg as the shirtless fan with the letter "T"
- Kinga Philipps as Mrs. Powers, Nigel's wife and Austin and Dr. Evil's mother
- Kevin Stea as Assistant Director of "Austinpussy" / Dancer
- Anna-Marie Goddard, Nina Kaczorowski, and Nikki Ziering as henchwomen
- Rachel Roberts as The Model
- Ming Tea as Themselves
  - Susanna Hoffs as Gillian Shagwell
  - Matthew Sweet as Sid Belvedere
  - Christopher Ward as Trevor Algberth
- Carrie Ann Inaba as Fook Yu
- Diane Mizota as Fook Mi
- Tom Lister Jr. as Prisoner #2
- Kristen Johnston as Dancer at Austin's pad
- Neil Mullarkey as Physician
- Nobu Matsuhisa as Mr. Roboto
- Peter Tuiasosopo as Sumo Wrestler with Beard
- Jeannette Charles as Queen Elizabeth II
- Perry Caravello (extra)

=== Cameos ===
- Tom Cruise as Himself as Austin Powers (during Austinpussy)
- Danny DeVito as Himself as Mini-Me (during Austinpussy)
- Gwyneth Paltrow as Herself as Dixie Normous (during Austinpussy)
- Kevin Spacey as Himself as Dr. Evil (during Austinpussy)
- Steven Spielberg as Himself
- Quincy Jones as Himself
- John Travolta as Himself as Goldmember (during the Austinpussy ending)
- Britney Spears as a Fembot version of Herself (during the opening credits) and as Herself talking with Mini-Me (during the end credits)
- Donna D'Errico as Female Vendor
- Fred Stoller as Melon Guy
- Ozzy Osbourne as Himself
- Sharon Osbourne as Herself
- Kelly Osbourne as Herself
- Jack Osbourne as Himself
- Burt Bacharach (during the end credits) as Himself
- Nathan Lane as Mysterious Disco Man (non-speaking role)
- Spencer Kayden as Jenny
- Katie Couric as Georgia State Prison guard
- Scott Aukerman as Nigel Powers (in flashback, having a tinkle)

== Production ==
=== Title concerns ===
The title of the film, Goldmember, led to legal action being taken by MGM, the distributors of the James Bond film franchise, that briefly led to the film's title being removed from promotional material and trailers. Several potential replacement titles were prepared, including License to Shag, Live and Let Shag, You Only Shag Thrice and Never Say Member Again. The dispute was quickly resolved and the film title remained unchanged on the provision that the film would include trailers in its cinema releases for the then-upcoming James Bond film, Die Another Day, and The Lord of the Rings: The Two Towers.

=== Characters ===
Austin Powers (Myers), having conquered the 1990s and the 1960s, travels back to the 1970s and teams up with his nemesis Dr. Evil (also played by Myers) to thwart a new villain, Goldmember (also played by Myers). Myers also plays Fat Bastard for the second time, this time parodying the kind of "wire fight" seen in Crouching Tiger, Hidden Dragon. The film also stars Beyoncé Knowles as Foxxy Cleopatra (parodying blaxploitation heroines, primarily Foxy Brown and Cleopatra Jones, as well as Christie Love when she says, "You're under arrest, sugah!"), Michael York, reprising the role of Basil Exposition, and Verne Troyer in his second appearance as Mini-Me. The film also introduced a new character named Number 3 (a.k.a. the Mole), who is portrayed by former child star Fred Savage. Clint Howard plays a radar operator in all three films. Michael Caine guest stars as Austin's father, Nigel; this role was inspired by the character of Harry Palmer from The Ipcress File, a 1965 film starring Caine. Sean Connery was originally considered for the role of Nigel Powers and Honor Blackman for that of Mrs. Powers.

Four actors who appeared in the earlier films play different characters in Goldmember. Rob Lowe, who played the friend of a dead guard in International Man of Mystery, reprises his role as a younger Number 2 from The Spy Who Shagged Me, while Neil Mullarkey (quartermaster clerk in International Man of Mystery) and Eric Winzenried (army private soldier in The Spy Who Shagged Me) appear as the Physician and Henchman Sailor in the Sick Bay. Michael McDonald (the Virtucon guard who got run over by a steamroller in International Man of Mystery and a NATO soldier in The Spy Who Shagged Me) appears as the royal guard.

In 2023, Heather Graham revealed that she had filmed a scene reprising her role as Felicity Shagwell for the film which was ultimately cut.

==== Goldmember ====
Johann van der Smut, better known as Goldmember, is a villain played by Myers (John Travolta plays the character in a cameo at the end of the film). The name was inspired by the James Bond villain Auric Goldfinger. Goldmember's Dutch origins and character traits were, according to Myers, inspired by an episode of the HBO TV series Real Sex featuring a Dutchman who operated a "sex barn" north of Rotterdam. The man's distinct forms of expression caught Myers' attention while he was writing.

== Home media ==
Austin Powers in Goldmember was released on VHS and DVD on December 3, 2002, by New Line Home Entertainment. The DVD was released under the Infinifilm label, and was re-packed in 2011 as part of the Austin Powers 3 Film Collection. The film debuted on Blu-ray for the first time on December 2, 2008 in a three-film collection with its predecessors.

== Reception ==
=== Box office ===
Austin Powers in Goldmember took in £6,364,796 in the United Kingdom on its opening weekend. In the United States, it broke the opening weekend record for a spoof movie, surpassing the previous Austin Powers films. It grossed $73.1 million during its opening weekend, surpassing Planet of the Apes for the biggest July opening of all time. The latter record would be held for two years until Spider-Man 2 took it in 2004. The film also surpassed Rush Hour 2 as the biggest opening for a comedy film. This was the fourth-highest opening weekend of all time, behind Star Wars: Episode II – Attack of the Clones, Harry Potter and the Sorcerer's Stone and Spider-Man. The film grossed a total of $213.3 million in the United States and $296.9 million worldwide.

=== Critical response ===
On Rotten Tomatoes, the film holds an approval rating of 52% based on 184 reviews, with an average rating of 5.8/10. The site's critical consensus reads, "While the narrative structure is messy and doesn't make much sense, the third installment of the Austin Powers franchise contains enough inspired bits to entertain." On Metacritic, the film has a weighted average score of 62 out of 100, based on 34 critics, indicating "generally favorable" reviews. Audiences polled by CinemaScore gave the film an average grade of "B+" on an A+ to F scale.

Lisa Schwarzbaum of Entertainment Weekly wrote in her review: "I’ll just suggest that the caliber of guests eager to be seen under the same glitter ball with Austin Powers is a credit to the in-crowd popularity of the groovy International Man of Mystery in his third caper."

Todd McCarthy of Variety wrote in his review: "The laughs are here, to be sure, although even some of the best of them are retreads and the Swinging ’60s recycling act is now feeling a bit past its zeitgeist prime."

=== Accolades ===
Myers was nominated for the MTV Movie Award for Best Villain for the third time, but lost against Daveigh Chase for her role as Samara Morgan in The Ring, making it the first time Myers lost the award. However, he did win the award for Best Comedic Performance, making it the first time he won the award, having previously lost twice for the first two films.

== Soundtrack ==
The song "Hey Goldmember" interpolates and is a parody of four 1970s disco songs formed into a medley; "Sing a Song" by Earth, Wind & Fire, "Get Down Tonight", "(Shake, Shake, Shake) Shake Your Booty", and "That's the Way (I Like It)", all by KC and the Sunshine Band.

== Possible sequel ==
In October 2005, in an interview with Entertainment Weekly, Mike Myers discussed the possibility of studio sources moving forward with a fourth film. "There is hope!". "We're all circling and talking to each other. I miss doing the characters." In May 2007, in an interview with IGN, "So no more Austin Powers?" was asked, and Myers replied, "No, no, there is a fully conceived idea for a fourth and I can just say that it's from Dr. Evil's point of view. So if you balanced how much of it was Austin with Dr. Evil, it's more about Dr. Evil than Austin." In the audio commentary from the DVD release of Goldmember, Myers revealed that in the fourth film, Fat Bastard would return and regain the weight that he lost in Goldmember.

In May 2007, at the Shrek the Third premiere, Myers announced that a fourth Austin Powers film was planned, reiterating that it would focus more on Dr. Evil rather than Austin. He also said that he would start work on it after he started work on The Love Guru, which became a box office bomb. In February 2008, it was announced that Jay Roach would return as director. In April 2008, it was reported that Gisele Bündchen had been offered a role in the film. However, Seth Green, who played Scott Evil, stated that there was no script at the moment and that Austin Powers 4 would be made if a script is written and approved. In June 2008, when asked about another Austin Powers film in an interview, Myers stated, "I have an idea, and again it's one of those things that will emerge or it won't." In July 2008, Myers stated that he had begun writing Austin Powers 4, and that the plot is "really about Dr. Evil and his son."

In March 2010, Jay Roach indicated to MTV that Myers is working on ideas for a fourth film. In August 2011, Myers revealed he would return, and had begun writing a script for a fourth installment. In September 2013, when asked about the future of Austin Powers, Myers answered "I'm still figuring that out." In September 2015, Verne Troyer expressed his desire to return as Mini-Me if he was asked to do so.

In May 2016, Roach was asked about the fourth Austin Powers film during an interview with Larry King, and he stated the ideas for the fourth film that he and Myers have are good and interesting. In August 2016, in a telephone interview, Myers stated "Everything is being negotiated and worked out and all that stuff" in regards to the fourth installment of the Austin Powers film series.

In April 2017, as the twentieth anniversary approached for Austin Powers: International Man of Mystery, Myers claimed he would love to do another Austin Powers film, but audiences would "just have to see". Two days later, Roach stated that a fourth film would only occur if Myers creates a good story for it. In May 2017, Troyer stated that Mini-Me will reveal that he can speak in the fourth movie. However, Troyer's death on April 21, 2018, delayed the production of a fourth film and prevented him from reprising his role as Mini-Me. In May 2018, Myers reiterated his interest in making a fourth Austin Powers, stating that it would be fun, also hinting that some tribute to Troyer might be included. In November 2018, Myers stated that the project's future is "looking good" with the script already written and that Austin Powers and Dr. Evil will return soon, citing his parenthood as the reason for how long the production has lasted and that Roach will most likely reprise his directorial duties.

In January 2020, Roach again indicated that he was interested in doing a fourth film. In February 2022, Myers told The Today Show he "would love to do" a fourth Austin Powers movie but could "neither confirm nor deny" whether it would be made. In October 2022, Myers stated on the Tonight Show that he would "love" to make another Austin Powers film, again citing parenting as the main reason as to why the film has not yet been made.

On June 16, 2026, during Trevor Noah's World Cup watch party, Myers simply answered "yes" when asked if there would be a fourth film.

== See also ==
- Outline of James Bond
