= Dr. Evil =

Austin Powers character

- Austin Powers character
- Mike Myers as Dr. Evil
- First appearance: Austin Powers: International Man of Mystery (1997)
- Last appearance: Austin Powers in Goldmember (2002)
- Created by: Mike Myers
- Based on: Ernst Stavro Blofeld
- Portrayed by: Mike Myers; Josh Zuckerman (young)

In-universe information
- Full name: Douglas Powers
- Family: Nigel Powers (father); Austin Powers (brother); Scott Evil (son); Chloé (adoptive mother); Mini-Me (clone)
- Nationality: British (former nationality); Belgian

Dr. Evil is a fictional character portrayed by Mike Myers in the Austin Powers film series. He is the main antagonist, and Austin Powers' nemesis and secret twin brother. He is a parody of James Bond villains, primarily Ernst Stavro Blofeld. Dr. Evil routinely hatches schemes to terrorize and take over the world, and is usually accompanied by "Number Two", his second-in-command who fronts his evil corporation Virtucon Industries, his personal assistant Frau Farbissina, and his sidekick Mini-Me, a dwarf clone of himself.

His name is a parody of villainous characters with the title "Doctor" who are often portrayed as mad scientists—which includes James Bond villain Dr. Julius No.

American costume maker Pp Morris had also created a long-running character named Dr. Evil in 1959. After an eight-year legal battle, New Line Cinema paid him a settlement in response to a trademark dispute.

== Creation ==
In 1997, an unnamed Saturday Night Live writer claimed Dr. Evil was based on SNL creator Lorne Michaels, saying: "It's the lower lip, the eyebrows, the whole way he talks." Another unnamed former SNL actor cited Michaels' "obsessing about minutiae, the way he ends everything by bringing his pinkie up and chewing the fingernail". Myers' former SNL castmate Dana Carvey claimed the character is based on a Michaels impersonation he performed, including the pinkie mannerism.

Myers disagreed, insisting the character was based on Donald Pleasence's portrayal of Bond villain Ernst Stavro Blofeld in You Only Live Twice. He later stated, "The Dr. Evil voice is a little bit Lorne Michaels ... but there is a lot more Donald Pleasence in there than Lorne. Lorne has a pinky thing, but he doesn’t do it anymore."

Myers initially did not intend to play Dr. Evil, and sought Jim Carrey for the role. Carrey was interested, but had to decline due to scheduling conflicts with Liar Liar (1997).

== Character background ==
In the first film, Austin Powers: International Man of Mystery, Dr. Evil is an internationally known criminal genius, cryogenically frozen in 1967 and reawakened in 1997. According to his own account, Dr. Evil's upbringing went as follows:

My father was a relentlessly self-improving boulangerie owner from Belgium, with low-grade narcolepsy and a penchant for buggery. My mother was a 15-year-old French prostitute named Chloe with webbed feet. My father would womanize, he would drink, he would make outrageous claims like he invented the question mark. Sometimes, he would accuse chestnuts of being lazy... the sort of general malaise that only the genius possess and the insane lament. My childhood was typical... summers in Rangoon, luge lessons. In the spring, we'd make meat helmets. When I was insolent, I was placed in a burlap bag and beaten with reeds. Pretty standard, really. At the age of 12, I received my first scribe. At the age of 14, a Zoroastrian named Vilma ritualistically shaved my testicles.

In the second film, he went on The Jerry Springer Show and declared that he was the "Princess of Canada".

In the third film, Goldmember, Nigel Powers reveals that Dr. Evil is in fact Austin Powers' twin brother, Douglas "Dougie" Powers. He explains that Douglas and Austin were separated as babies following a car explosion, and that he had thought that only Austin had survived. Following the explosion, Dougie was raised in Bruges, Belgium.

== Relationships with other characters ==
=== Scott Evil ===
Dr. Evil has a strained relationship with his son Scott (played by Seth Green), even liquidating their therapy group over an accusation of insolence. Scott points out Dr. Evil's incompetence and immaturity, as well as obvious mistakes and flaws in his plans. Scott later grows more "evil" and momentarily gains his father's respect, especially after Scott provides him a pool filled with sharks with laser-beams attached to their heads. When Dr. Evil switches sides to help Austin save the world, Scott takes over as the head of the evil organization.

=== Mr. Bigglesworth ===
Ted Nude Gent as Mr. Bigglesworth

Mr. Bigglesworth is Dr. Evil's cat. He initially appears similar to Blofeld's cat from the James Bond films, a typical white Persian cat with long fur. However, he emergers from Dr. Evil's in a cryonic capsule hairless, having lost all his fur due to an error in the thawing process. His bald incarnation is played by a Sphynx cat named Ted Nude Gent. Dr. Evil's miniature clone, Mini-Me, has a kitten named Mini Mr. Bigglesworth.

=== Minions ===
Dr. Evil employs a stereotypical and diverse group of minions.

- His personal assistant Frau Farbissina (played by Mindy Sterling) is the founder of the militant wing of The Salvation Army. ("Farbissina" is Yiddish for "embittered".) In the second film, Austin Powers: The Spy Who Shagged Me, after imbibing some of Austin Powers' mojo, Dr. Evil becomes temporarily irresistible to Frau Farbissina, who is portrayed as a lesbian. Their brief sexual encounter led to the conception and eventual birth of Scott Evil. In Goldmember, Farbissina and Dr. Evil kiss while he is in prison; the purpose was to transfer a key to Evil so that he could escape.
- Number Two (played by Robert Wagner, while the younger Number Two is portrayed by Rob Lowe, and the teenage Number Two by Evan Farmer) leads Dr. Evil's industrial empire Virtucon and is primarily concerned with the financial aspects of world domination. In successive films, his schemes and ventures garner massive profits for Virtucon without straying very far into illegality.
- Fat Bastard (also portrayed by Mike Myers) is a morbidly obese henchman hailing from Scotland, said to weigh a metric ton. His extreme size endows Fat Bastard with super-human strength. Fat Bastard is noted for his foul temper, frequent flatulence, vulgar manners, and cannibalism. Fat Bastard reappears at the end of Austin Powers in Goldmember, having lost most of his girth and attributing the loss to the "Subway diet".
- Random Task is an ex-wrestler whose personality and assassination style parody those of Oddjob from Goldfinger, except that he throws his shoe instead of his hat.
- Patty O'Brien is an ex-assassin who is extremely superstitious, leaving a keepsake from his good-luck charm bracelet on the body of every victim he kills. Apparently Scotland Yard has been trying to recover that bracelet for some time.
- Mustafa (played by Will Ferrell) designs the cryogenic freezing process that preserves Dr. Evil for 30 years.
- The second film introduces Dr. Evil's clone Mini-Me (played by Verne Troyer) who is "one-eighth his size but twice as evil." Dr. Evil considers him more of a real son than Scott, provoking the latter's jealousy. Mini-Me later joins Austin to become a miniature version of him. As revealed by Myers in the audio commentary for The Spy Who Shagged Me, Mini-Me is a parody of the character Majai, from the film The Island of Dr. Moreau, as played by Nelson de la Rosa, whose sole purpose in that film is to follow Marlon Brando's Dr. Moreau character and copy his every move, dressing identically to Brando. Majai never speaks in the film, and similarly, Mini-Me does not speak either. At their secret Island hideout in Austin Powers: The Spy Who Shagged Me, Dr. Evil plays a Bösendorfer Imperial piano; incidentally, 'böse' means evil in German. While Mini-Me plays a "mini Bösendorfer Imperial" piano

== In television ==
Myers later revived the Dr. Evil character for a brief appearance on the December 20, 2014 episode of Saturday Night Live, a show on which Myers had previously had a regular role. During the sketch, Dr. Evil lampooned North Korea and Sony Pictures on their spat over The Interview. Myers once again revived the character for a brief appearance on a 2018 episode of The Tonight Show Starring Jimmy Fallon in a sketch where Dr. Evil has been fired from President Trump's cabinet, and again on Election Day to announce his run for Congress.

Myers subsequently played Dr. Evil in a Super Bowl LVI commercial for General Motors. Seth Green, Rob Lowe, and Mindy Sterling also reprised their roles as Scott Evil, Number Two, and Frau Farbissina. In the commercial, Dr. Evil along with his henchmen take over General Motors, but his henchmen tell him that climate change is the biggest threat of the planet, making Dr. Evil the second threat on the planet. So, Evil decides he and his henchmen will save the planet, with the lineup of the company's electric vehicles. Scott Evil also informs his father he has a grandson named Kyle (but Dr. Evil names him Baby Me).

Myers once again revived the character in a 2026 Verizon Wireless commercial, with Seth Green, Rob Lowe, and Mindy Sterling returning to their roles as Scott Evil, Number Two, and Frau Farbissina.
