= Austin Powers (character) =

Fictional character

- Austin Powers character
- Mike Myers as Austin Powers in Austin Powers: International Man of Mystery
- First appearance: Austin Powers: International Man of Mystery (1997)
- Last appearance: Austin Powers in Goldmember (2002)
- Created by: Mike Myers
- Based on: James Bond
- Portrayed by: Mike Myers; Aaron Himelstein (young); Tom Cruise (in Austinpussy)

In-universe information
- Full name: Austin Danger Powers
- Alias: Richie Cunningham
- Occupation: Spy for the Ministry of Defence
- Family: Nigel Powers (father); Douglas Powers (twin-brother)
- Spouse: Vanessa Kensington (deceased)
- Significant others: Felicity Shagwell; Foxxy Cleopatra
- Relatives: Mini-Me (nephew); Scott Evil (nephew); Frau Farbissina (sister-in-law); Helga Powers (grandmother); Kyle (great-nephew)
- Nationality: English

Austin Danger Powers is a fictional character from the Austin Powers series of films, created and portrayed by Mike Myers. He is the protagonist of Austin Powers: International Man of Mystery (1997), Austin Powers: The Spy Who Shagged Me (1999) and Austin Powers in Goldmember (2002).

He is a womanizing, hard-partying English spy embodying the Swinging London mod and hippie culture of the late 1960s. Along with his nemesis Dr. Evil, he was frozen in a cryonics experiment, then unfrozen years later. The series' humor follows his attempts to adjust to the modern world as he continues to try to save it from terrorism.

== Personality ==
The character of Austin Powers was primarily a spoof of secret agents in 1960s spy films and spy spoof films, being influenced by Sean Connery's James Bond, Peter Sellers's Evelyn Tremble in Casino Royale (1967), Matt Helm in Dean Martin's films, James Coburn's Derek Flint in Our Man Flint (1966) and In Like Flint (1967), and Michael Caine's Harry Palmer in films such as The Ipcress File (1965) and Funeral in Berlin (1966), especially his thick horn-rimmed glasses. Myers was also influenced by the flamboyant dress sense of Jason King, played by Peter Wyngarde.

The character of Austin Powers represents an archetype of 1960s Swinging London, with his advocacy for free love, his use of obscure expressions and his clothing style (including crushed velvet suits and Beatle boots).

== Development ==
Myers, Matthew Sweet and Susanna Hoffs formed the faux British 1960s band Ming Tea after Myers's Saturday Night Live stint in the early 1990s. The band members all performed under pseudonyms with 1960s' personas. Myers adopted the pseudonym and character of Austin Powers.

This group made a number of live club and television performances in character. Myers's then wife, Robin Ruzan, encouraged him to write a film based on Austin Powers. Obituaries of Simon Dee (1935–2009), the radio and BBC television presenter, stated that his "Sixties grooviness" made him the inspiration for the character.

Heavily influenced by British pop culture growing up, Myers has claimed that his British-born father was the inspiration behind Austin Powers.

== Other media ==
- HBO purchased the rights to produce an animated series based on the Austin Powers films in May 1999. Despite announcing plans for a thirteen-episode season, HBO ultimately shelved the project.
- Austin Powers has been used for advertising numerous products and endorsements, such as Pepsi.
- He also appears in the music videos for Madonna's "Beautiful Stranger", Beyoncé's "Work It Out" and Britney Spears' "Boys".
- Powers appears in all video games based on the film series, including Austin Powers Pinball, Austin Powers: Welcome to My Underground Lair!, Austin Powers: Oh, Behave!, and Austin Powers Operation: Trivia.
- Powers is featured in an episode of the web show Epic Rap Battles of History, where he is pitted against James Bond. He is performed by the series co-creator Peter Shukoff.

== In popular culture ==
The May 2010 game Red Dead Redemption features an achievement called Austin Overpowered, requiring players to clear out hideouts in the New Austin region of the game.

In November 2010, he was voted #23 in Entertainment Weekly's list "The 100 Greatest Characters of the Last 20 Years."

== See also ==
- Outline of James Bond
- Our Man Flint, another James Bond parody film; Austin calls its sequel, In Like Flint, his favorite movie
- Matt Helm as played in 1960s' films by Dean Martin shares many qualities with Austin Powers, including his cover profession as a fashion photographer.
