= List of Take-Two Interactive games =

Headquartered in Manhattan, New York, Take-Two Interactive is an American video game holding company founded in September 1993 by Ryan Brant. It publishes games through 2K Games (Battleborn, BioShock, Borderlands, Evolve, Mafia, Sid Meier's Civilization, The Darkness, XCOM), 2K Play (Carnival Games), 2K Sports (NBA 2K, WWE 2K), Ghost Story Games, Private Division (Kerbal Space Program), Rockstar Games (Bully, Grand Theft Auto, L.A. Noire, Manhunt, Max Payne, Midnight Club, Red Dead) and Zynga (FarmVille, Zynga Poker). In the past, Take-Two operated Gathering of Developers (May 1998–September 2004), Global Star Software (August 1999–September 2007), Gotham Games (July 2002–December 2003), Mission Studios (September 1996 – 2001), On Deck Interactive (May 2000–March 2001), Take-Two Licensing (September 2003–January 2005) and TalonSoft (December 1998 – 2002).

== Games developed ==
Title	Platform	Release date	Developer(s)	Publisher	Ref.
Star Crusader	MS-DOS, Amiga, CD32	February 11, 1994	Take-Two Interactive	GameTek	
Hell: A Cyberpunk Thriller	MS-DOS, 3DO	October 4, 1994	Take-Two Interactive	GameTek	
Star Crusader: Bonus Missions Pack	MS-DOS	November 16, 1994	Take-Two Interactive	GameTek	
Master of Orion	Mac OS	April 28, 1995	Take-Two Interactive	GameTek	
Bureau 13	MS-DOS	September 18, 1995	Take-Two Interactive	GameTek	
Iron & Blood: Warriors of Ravenloft	PlayStation	October 3, 1996	Take-Two Interactive	Acclaim Entertainment	
Iron & Blood: Warriors of Ravenloft	MS-DOS	January 7, 1997	Take-Two Interactive	Acclaim Entertainment	
Black Dahlia	Microsoft Windows	February 28, 1998	Take-Two Interactive	Interplay Entertainment	

== Games published ==
This list includes all games developed by external and/or internal developers that were published by On Deck Interactive and Take-Two Interactive.

Title	Platform	Release date	Developer(s)	Publisher	Ref.
Millennia: Altered Destinies	MS-DOS	May 12, 1995	Take-Two Interactive	Take-Two Interactive	
Ripper	MS-DOS	March 4, 1996	Take-Two Interactive	Take-Two Interactive	
Ripper	Mac OS	March 4, 1996	Take-Two Interactive	Take-Two Interactive	
Maximum Roadkill	MS-DOS	March 12, 1996	Bits Studios	Take-Two Interactive	
Battlecruiser 3000AD	MS-DOS	September 20, 1996	3000AD	Take-Two Interactive	
Callahan's Crosstime Saloon	MS-DOS	April 4, 1997	Legend Entertainment	Take-Two Interactive	
The Reap	Microsoft Windows	August 6, 1997	Housemarque	Take-Two Interactive	
Wheel of Fortune	Nintendo 64	November 28, 1997	GameTek	Take-Two Interactive	
Jeopardy!	Nintendo 64	February 25, 1998	GameTek	Take-Two Interactive	
Scenery Pack for Microsoft Flight Simulator: Great Britain Part 1 for Microsoft Windows '95	Microsoft Windows	April 3, 1998	Flight Simulations	Take-Two Interactive	
Dark Colony	Mac OS	May 5, 1998	Alternative Reality Technologies	Take-Two Interactive	
Lula: Virtual Babe	Microsoft Windows	May 5, 1998	CDV Software	Take-Two Interactive	
Grand Theft Auto	PlayStation	June 30, 1998	Visual Sciences	Take-Two Interactive	
Montezuma's Return!	Microsoft Windows	September 30, 1998	Utopia Technologies	Take-Two Interactive	
Lula: The Sexy Empire	Microsoft Windows	October 17, 1998	Interactive Strip	Take-Two Interactive	
Space Station Silicon Valley	Nintendo 64	October 21, 1998	DMA Design	Take-Two Interactive	
Scenery Pack for Microsoft Flight Simulator: Great Britain Part 2 for Microsoft Windows '95	Microsoft Windows	December 8, 1998	Flight Simulations	Take-Two Interactive	
Las Vegas Cool Hand	Game Boy	December 11, 1998	Tarantula Studios	Take-Two Interactive	
Las Vegas Cool Hand	Game Boy Color	December 11, 1998	Tarantula Studios	Take-Two Interactive	
Montezuma's Return!	Game Boy	December 11, 1998	Tarantula Studios	Take-Two Interactive	
Montezuma's Return!	Game Boy Color	December 11, 1998	Tarantula Studios	Take-Two Interactive	
Rats!	Game Boy	December 11, 1998	Tarantula Studios	Take-Two Interactive	
Biosys	Microsoft Windows	February 16, 1999	JumpStart Interactive	Take-Two Interactive	
Monkey Hero	PlayStation	February 26, 1999	Blam!	Take-Two Interactive	
Rats!	Game Boy Color	March 10, 1999	Tarantula Studios	Take-Two Interactive	
Alexi Lalas International Soccer	PlayStation	May 21, 1999	Z-Axis	Take-Two Interactive	
Hollywood Pinball	Game Boy Color	June 1, 1999	Tarantula Studios	Take-Two Interactive	
Scenery Pack for Microsoft Flight Simulator: Great Britain Part 3 for Microsoft Windows '95	Microsoft Windows	June 16, 1999	Flight Simulations	Take-Two Interactive	
Space Station Silicon Valley	Game Boy Color	July 1, 1999	Tarantula Studios	Take-Two Interactive	
A Bug's Life	PlayStation	July 2, 1999	Traveller's Tales	Take-Two Interactive	
Three Lions/Golden Goal	Game Boy Color	July 9, 1999	Tarantula Studios	Take-Two Interactive	
In-Fisherman Bass Hunter 64	Nintendo 64	July 30, 1999	GearHead Entertainment	Take-Two Interactive	
Jim Henson's Muppets	Game Boy Color	October 12, 1999	Tarantula Studios	Take-Two Interactive	
Railroad Tycoon II	PlayStation	February 1, 2000	Tremor Entertainment	Take-Two Interactive	
Wetrix+	Dreamcast	April 5, 2000	Zed Two Game Design Studio	Take-Two Interactive	
Grudge Warriors	PlayStation	April 27, 2000	Tempest Software	Take-Two Interactive	
Lemmings Revolution	Microsoft Windows	April 28, 2000	Psygnosis	Take-Two Interactive	
Flying Heroes	Microsoft Windows	May 2, 2000	Pterodon / Illusion Softworks	Take-Two Interactive	
Spec Ops: Stealth Patrol	PlayStation	June 5, 2000	Runecraft	Take-Two Interactive	
Evo's Space Adventures	PlayStation	June 13, 2000	Runecraft	Take-Two Interactive	
Action Bass	PlayStation	July 14, 2000	Vingt-et-un Systems	Take-Two Interactive	
Ball Breakers	PlayStation	July 26, 2000	Lost Toys	Take-Two Interactive	
Formula One 2000	Game Boy Color	October 4, 2000	Tarantula Studios	Take-Two Interactive	
Death Track Racing	Microsoft Windows	October 10, 2000	Attention to Detail	Take-Two Interactive	
Pro Pinball: Fantastic Journey	PlayStation	October 17, 2000	Cunning Developments	Take-Two Interactive	
Q-Ball: Billiards Master	PlayStation 2	October 26, 2000	Ornith Studio	Take-Two Interactive	
Bugdom	Microsoft Windows	October 27, 2000	Contraband Entertainment	On Deck Interactive	
KISS: Psycho Circus – The Nightmare Child	Dreamcast	October 29, 2000	Tremor Entertainment	Take-Two Interactive	
Motocross Mania	Microsoft Windows	October 31, 2000	Deibus Studios	On Deck Interactive	
The Devil Inside	Microsoft Windows	October 31, 2000	Cryo Interactive Entertainment	Take-Two Interactive	
Ball Breakers	Microsoft Windows	November 3, 2000	Broadsword Interactive	Take-Two Interactive	
Soul Ride	Microsoft Windows	November 4, 2000	Slingshot Game Technology	On Deck Interactive	
Ball Breakers	Dreamcast	November 24, 2000	Broadsword Interactive	Take-Two Interactive	
Sheep	Microsoft Windows	November 29, 2000	Minds Eye Productions	Take-Two Interactive	
Lemmings & Oh No! More Lemmings	Game Boy Color	December 20, 2000	J-Wing Co.	Take-Two Interactive	
Aqua GT	Dreamcast	December 22, 2000	Promethean Designs	Take-Two Interactive	
The Ward	Microsoft Windows	January 22, 2001	Fragile Bits	On Deck Interactive	
Aqua GT	PlayStation	January 26, 2001	Promethean Designs	Take-Two Interactive	
UEFA Champions League Season 2000/2001	PlayStation	February 9, 2001	Silion Dreams Studio	Take-Two Interactive	
Darkstone	PlayStation	March 1, 2001	Delphine Software International	Take-Two Interactive	
Outlive	Microsoft Windows	March 19, 2001	Continuum Entertainment	Take-Two Interactive	
Kiss Pinball	Microsoft Windows	April 25, 2001	Wildfire Studios	On Deck Interactive	
Kiss Pinball	PlayStation	April 25, 2001	Tarantula Studios	Take-Two Interactive	
Spec Ops: Ranger Elite	PlayStation	April 26, 2001	Runecraft	Take-Two Interactive	
Spec Ops: Covert Assault	PlayStation	June 28, 2001	Runecraft	Take-Two Interactive	
Motocross Mania	PlayStation	July 13, 2001	Deibus Studios	Take-Two Interactive	
The Corporate Machine	Microsoft Windows	July 14, 2001	Stardock Entertainment	Take-Two Interactive	
City Crisis	PlayStation 2	July 18, 2001	Syscom Entertainment	Take-Two Interactive	
Rune: Viking Warlord	PlayStation 2	July 28, 2001	Human Head Studios	Take-Two Interactive	
Green Berets: Powered by Myth II	Microsoft Windows	July 30, 2001	Take-Two Interactive	Take-Two Interactive	
Green Berets: Powered by Myth II	Mac OS	July 30, 2001	Take-Two Interactive	Take-Two Interactive	
MTV Total Request Live Trivia	Microsoft Windows	August 15, 2001	Hypnotix	Take-Two Interactive	
Tang Tang	Game Boy Advance	August 28, 2001	GameVision Corporation	Take-Two Interactive	
Gadget Tycoon	Microsoft Windows	September 19, 2001	Monte Cristo	Take-Two Interactive	
Martian Gothic: Unification	PlayStation	November 4, 2001	Coyote Developments	Take-Two Interactive	
Hidden & Dangerous	PlayStation	November 23, 2001	Tarantula Studios	Take-Two Interactive	
Saltwater Sportfishing	PlayStation	November 28, 2001	Coresoft	Take-Two Interactive	
UEFA Champions League Season 2001/2002	Microsoft Windows	February 1, 2002	Silicon Dreams Studio	Take-Two Interactive	
UEFA Champions League Season 2001/2002	PlayStation 2	February 1, 2002	Silicon Dreams Studio	Take-Two Interactive	
Mall Tycoon	Microsoft Windows	February 4, 2002	Holistic Design	Take-Two Interactive	
Emergency 2: The Ultimate Fight for Life	Microsoft Windows	April 8, 2002	Sixteen Tons Entertainment	Take-Two Interactive	
Big Bass Fishing	PlayStation	May 3, 2002	Coresoft	Take-Two Interactive	
Loco-Commotion	Microsoft Windows	September 8, 2002	Plastic Reality Technologies / Fanatic Games	Take-Two Interactive	
Fatal Frame III: The Tormented	PlayStation 2	February 24, 2006	Tecmo	Take-Two Interactive	

== Games distributed ==
Title	Platform	Release date	Developer(s)	Publisher	Ref.
Armor Command	Microsoft Windows	May 19, 1998	Ronim Entertainment	Take-Two Interactive	
Tom Clancy's Rainbow Six	Microsoft Windows	October 6, 1998	Red Storm Entertainment	Take-Two Interactive	
Centipede	Game Boy Color	November 30, 1998	The Code Monkeys	Take-Two Interactive	
Battleship: The Classic Naval Combat Game	Game Boy Color	March 18, 1999	Use Corporation	Take-Two Interactive	
Aironauts	PlayStation	August 6, 1999	Red Lemon Studios	Take-Two Interactive	
Spec Ops II: Green Berets	Microsoft Windows	October 31, 1999	Zombie Studios	TalonSoft	
Tom Clancy's Rainbow Six: Rogue Spear	Microsoft Windows	October 31, 1999	Red Storm Entertainment	Take-Two Interactive	
Dirt Track Racing	Microsoft Windows	November 15, 1999	Ratbag	Take-Two Interactive	
Rocket: Robot on Wheels	Nintendo 64	November 17, 1999	Sucker Punch Productions	Jack of All Games	
You Don't Know Jack: Volume 3	Microsoft Windows	December 9, 1999	Jellyvision Games	Take-Two Interactive	
Tom Clancy's Rainbow Six: Rogue Spear Mission Pack – Urban Operations	Microsoft Windows	April 21, 2000	Red Storm Entertainment	Take-Two Interactive	
XS Moto	PlayStation	April 22, 2000	Interactive Entertainment	Take-Two Interactive	
Spin Jam	PlayStation	July 27, 2000	H2O Entertainment	Take-Two Interactive	
Tunguska: Legend of Faith	PlayStation	October 5, 2000	Exortus	Take-Two Interactive	
Pipe Dreams 3D	PlayStation	October 23, 2000	Sick Puppies Studio	Take-Two Interactive	
Spec Ops II: Operation Bravo	Microsoft Windows	October 31, 2000	Zombie Studios	TalonSoft	
Speedball 2100	PlayStation	November 30, 2000	The Bitmap Brothers	Take-Two Interactive	
You Don't Know Jack: Volume 4 – The Ride	Microsoft Windows	December 16, 2000	Jellyvision Games	Take-Two Interactive	
Duke Nukem: Land of the Babes	PlayStation	April 6, 2001	N-Space / 3D Realms	Take-Two Interactive	
Leadfoot: Stadium Off-Road Racing	Microsoft Windows	August 21, 2001	Ratbag	Take-Two Interactive	
Carrera Grand Prix	Microsoft Windows	October 30, 2001	Intelligent Games	Take-Two Interactive	
Trade Empires	Microsoft Windows	November 13, 2001	Frog City Software	Take-Two Interactive	
Monsters Inc.: Pinball Panic Mini Game	Microsoft Windows	March 19, 2002	Sapient Interactive	Take-Two Interactive	
Duke Nukem Advance	Game Boy Advance	August 12, 2002	Torus Games	Take-Two Interactive	
Another War	Microsoft Windows	September 30, 2002	Alien Artefact / Mirage Interactive	Gathering of Developers	
Another War	Macintosh	December 31, 2002	MacPlay	Gathering of Developers	
Football Generation	Microsoft Windows	January 31, 2003	Trecision	Take-Two Interactive	
Sternenschiff Catan: Das Strategische Weltraumabenteuer	Microsoft Windows	April 29, 2003	Rockazonga	Take-Two Interactive	
Chrome	Microsoft Windows	September 19, 2003	Techland	Gathering of Developers	
Pirate Hunter	Microsoft Windows	October 24, 2003	Ascaron	Take-Two Interactive	
You Don't Know Jack: Volume 6 - "The Lost Gold"	Microsoft Windows	December 1, 2003	Jellyvision Games	Take-Two Interactive	
Sacred	Microsoft Windows	February 27, 2004	Ascaron	Take-Two Interactive	
Fallout: Brotherhood of Steel	PlayStation 2	April 2, 2004	Interplay Entertainment	Take-Two Interactive	
Fallout: Brotherhood of Steel	Xbox	April 2, 2004	Interplay Entertainment	Take-Two Interactive	
Port Royale 2	Microsoft Windows	April 30, 2004	Ascaron	Take-Two Interactive	
Drakengard	PlayStation 2	May 21, 2004	Cavia	Gathering of Developers	
John Deere: American Farmer	Microsoft Windows	June 23, 2004	Gabriel Entertainment	Global Star Software	
Traumschiff Surprise	Microsoft Windows	July 1, 2004	Phenomedia / Sproing	Take-Two Interactive	
Arena Wars	Microsoft Windows	July 16, 2004	ExDream	Gathering of Developers	
Holiday World	Microsoft Windows	July 30, 2004	Island Games	Gathering of Developers	
The Great Art Race	Microsoft Windows	September 10, 2004	Ascaron	Take-Two Interactive	
Emergency 3	Microsoft Windows	January 21, 2005	Sixteen Tons Entertainment	Take-Two Interactive	
Sacred: Underworld	Microsoft Windows	March 24, 2005	Studio II Software	Take-Two Interactive	
Cross Racing Championship 2005	Microsoft Windows	July 22, 2005	Invictus Games	Take-Two Interactive	
Ankh	Microsoft Windows	February 24, 2006	Deck 13 Interactive	Take-Two Interactive	
Alfa Romeo Racing Italiano	PlayStation 2	March 14, 2006	Milestone	Jack of All Games	
Tokobot	PlayStation Portable	April 7, 2006	Tecmo	Take-Two Interactive	
Emergency 4: Global Fighters for Life	Microsoft Windows	April 13, 2006	Sixteen Tons Entertainment	Take-Two Interactive	
Die Kicker Quiz-WM	Microsoft Windows	November 28, 2006	Coda Entertainment	Take-Two Interactive	
The Show	Microsoft Windows	February 23, 2007	Sixteen Tons Entertainment	Take-Two Interactive	

== See also ==
- List of 2K games, for a list of all 2K Games, 2K Play and 2K Sports titles
- List of Private Division games
- List of games by Rockstar Games
- List of Global Star Software games
