= List of video games published by Rockstar Games =

Rockstar Games is a video game publisher established under Take-Two Interactive in 1998. It is best known for the Grand Theft Auto series; other well-known releases include Bully, L.A. Noire, and the Red Dead, Max Payne and Midnight Club series.

== List ==
Title	Platform	Release date	Developer(s)	Ref.
Grand Theft Auto: Mission Pack #1 – London 1969	MS-DOS	April 6, 1999	Rockstar Canada	
Grand Theft Auto: Mission Pack #1 – London 1969	Windows	April 6, 1999	Rockstar Canada	
Grand Theft Auto: Mission Pack #1 – London 1969	PlayStation	April 30, 1999	Runecraft	
Grand Theft Auto: Mission Pack #2 – London 1961	MS-DOS	July 1, 1999	Rockstar Canada	
Grand Theft Auto: Mission Pack #2 – London 1961	Windows	July 1, 1999	Rockstar Canada	
Monster Truck Madness 64	Nintendo 64	July 30, 1999	Edge of Reality	
Grand Theft Auto 2	Windows	October 22, 1999	DMA Design	
Grand Theft Auto 2	PlayStation	October 22, 1999	DMA Design	
Grand Theft Auto 2	Dreamcast	April 30, 2000	DMA Design	
Grand Theft Auto 2	Game Boy Color	December 12, 2000	Tarantula Studios	
Earthworm Jim 3D	Nintendo 64	October 31, 1999 (Note: North American release, European release was published by Interplay Entertainment.)	VIS Entertainment	
Thrasher: Skate and Destroy	PlayStation	November 15, 1999	Z-Axis	
Evel Knievel	Game Boy Color	November 22, 1999 (Note: North American release, European release is under the standard Take-Two Interactive label.)	Tarantula Studios	
Grand Theft Auto	Game Boy Color	November 22, 1999	Tarantula Studios	
Wild Metal	Dreamcast	February 1, 2000	DMA Design	
Austin Powers: Oh, Behave!	Game Boy Color	September 17, 2000	Tarantula Studios	
Austin Powers: Welcome to My Underground Lair!	Game Boy Color	September 17, 2000	Tarantula Studios	
Midnight Club: Street Racing	PlayStation 2	October 26, 2000	Angel Studios	
Smuggler's Run	PlayStation 2	October 26, 2000	Angel Studios	
Surfing H3O	PlayStation 2	October 27, 2000	Opus Corp.	
Oni	PlayStation 2	January 29, 2001	Rockstar Canada / Tarantula Studios	
You Don't Know Jack	PlayStation	April 21, 2001 (Note: Published by Rockstar exclusively in Germany. Original North American release was published by Sierra Attractions.)	Starsphere	
Grand Theft Auto III	PlayStation 2	October 22, 2001	DMA Design	
Grand Theft Auto III	Windows	May 21, 2002	Rockstar North	
Grand Theft Auto III	Xbox	November 4, 2003	Rockstar North	
Grand Theft Auto III	macOS	November 12, 2010	TransGaming	
Grand Theft Auto III	Android	December 15, 2011	War Drum Studios	
Grand Theft Auto III	iOS	December 15, 2011	War Drum Studios	
Grand Theft Auto III	Amazon Fire TV	May 15, 2014	War Drum Studios	
Grand Theft Auto III	Fire OS	May 15, 2014	War Drum Studios	
Smuggler's Run 2: Hostile Territory	PlayStation 2	October 29, 2001	Angel Studios	
Max Payne	PlayStation 2	December 6, 2001	Neo Software Produktions	
Max Payne	Xbox	December 12, 2001	Rockstar Canada	
Max Payne	Game Boy Advance	December 16, 2003	Möbius Entertainment	
Max Payne	iOS	April 12, 2012	War Drum Studios	
Max Payne	Android	June 14, 2012	War Drum Studios	
State of Emergency	PlayStation 2	February 13, 2002	VIS Entertainment	
State of Emergency	Xbox	March 26, 2003	VIS Entertainment	
The Italian Job	PlayStation	May 3, 2002 (Note: North American release. The European release was published by SCi Games.)	Pixelogic Limited	
Smuggler's Run: Warzones	GameCube	August 6, 2002	Angel Studios	
Grand Theft Auto: Vice City	PlayStation 2	October 29, 2002	Rockstar North	
Grand Theft Auto: Vice City	Windows	May 13, 2003	Rockstar North	
Grand Theft Auto: Vice City	Xbox	November 4, 2003	Rockstar North	
Grand Theft Auto: Vice City	macOS	November 12, 2010	TransGaming	
Grand Theft Auto: Vice City	iOS	December 6, 2012	War Drum Studios	
Grand Theft Auto: Vice City	Android	December 12, 2012	War Drum Studios	
Grand Theft Auto: Vice City	Amazon Fire TV	May 15, 2014	War Drum Studios	
Grand Theft Auto: Vice City	Fire OS	May 15, 2014	War Drum Studios	
Midnight Club II	PlayStation 2	April 8, 2003	Rockstar San Diego	
Midnight Club II	Xbox	June 3, 2003	Rockstar San Diego	
Midnight Club II	Windows	July 2, 2003	Rockstar San Diego	
Max Payne 2: The Fall of Max Payne	Windows	October 14, 2003	Remedy Entertainment	
Max Payne 2: The Fall of Max Payne	Xbox	November 25, 2003	Rockstar Vienna	
Max Payne 2: The Fall of Max Payne	PlayStation 2	December 2, 2003	Rockstar Vienna	
Manhunt	PlayStation 2	November 18, 2003	Rockstar North	
Manhunt	Windows	April 20, 2004	Rockstar North	
Manhunt	Xbox	April 20, 2004	Rockstar North	
Red Dead Revolver	PlayStation 2	May 4, 2004	Rockstar San Diego	
Red Dead Revolver	Xbox	May 4, 2004	Rockstar San Diego	
Grand Theft Auto Advance	Game Boy Advance	October 26, 2004	Digital Eclipse	
Grand Theft Auto: San Andreas	PlayStation 2	October 26, 2004	Rockstar North	
Grand Theft Auto: San Andreas	Windows	June 7, 2005	Rockstar North	
Grand Theft Auto: San Andreas	Xbox	June 7, 2005	Rockstar North	
Grand Theft Auto: San Andreas	macOS	November 12, 2010	TransGaming	
Grand Theft Auto: San Andreas	iOS	December 12, 2013	War Drum Studios	
Grand Theft Auto: San Andreas	Android	January 7, 2014	War Drum Studios	
Grand Theft Auto: San Andreas	Fire OS	January 7, 2014	War Drum Studios	
Grand Theft Auto: San Andreas	Windows Phone	January 28, 2014	War Drum Studios	
Grand Theft Auto: San Andreas	Microsoft Windows Apps	February 17, 2014	War Drum Studios	
Grand Theft Auto: San Andreas	Amazon Fire TV	May 15, 2014	War Drum Studios	
Grand Theft Auto: San Andreas	Xbox 360	October 26, 2014	War Drum Studios	
Grand Theft Auto: San Andreas	PlayStation 3	December 1, 2015	War Drum Studios	
Midnight Club 3: DUB Edition	PlayStation 2	April 12, 2005	Rockstar San Diego	
Midnight Club 3: DUB Edition	Xbox	April 12, 2005	Rockstar San Diego	
Midnight Club 3: DUB Edition	PlayStation Portable	June 26, 2005	Rockstar Leeds	
The Warriors	PlayStation 2	October 17, 2005	Rockstar Toronto	
The Warriors	Xbox	October 17, 2005	Rockstar Toronto	
The Warriors	PlayStation Portable	February 12, 2007	Rockstar Leeds	
Grand Theft Auto: Liberty City Stories	PlayStation Portable	October 24, 2005	Rockstar Leeds / Rockstar North	
Grand Theft Auto: Liberty City Stories	PlayStation 2	June 6, 2006	Rockstar Leeds / Rockstar North	
Grand Theft Auto: Liberty City Stories	iOS	December 17, 2015	Lucid Games	
Grand Theft Auto: Liberty City Stories	Android	February 11, 2016	Lucid Games	
Grand Theft Auto: Liberty City Stories	Amazon Fire TV	March 11, 2016	Lucid Games	
Grand Theft Auto: Liberty City Stories	Fire OS	March 11, 2016	Lucid Games	
Midnight Club 3: DUB Edition Remix	PlayStation 2	March 13, 2006	Rockstar San Diego	
Midnight Club 3: DUB Edition Remix	Xbox	March 13, 2006	Rockstar San Diego	
Rockstar Games Presents Table Tennis	Xbox 360	May 22, 2006	Rockstar San Diego / Rockstar Vienna	
Rockstar Games Presents Table Tennis	Wii	October 16, 2007	Rockstar Leeds	
Bully	PlayStation 2	October 17, 2006	Rockstar Vancouver	
Grand Theft Auto: Vice City Stories	PlayStation Portable	October 31, 2006	Rockstar Leeds / Rockstar North	
Grand Theft Auto: Vice City Stories	PlayStation 2	March 6, 2007	Rockstar Leeds / Rockstar North	
Manhunt 2	PlayStation 2	October 30, 2007	Rockstar London / Rockstar North	
Manhunt 2	PlayStation Portable	October 30, 2007	Rockstar Leeds	
Manhunt 2	Wii	October 30, 2007	Rockstar Toronto	
Manhunt 2	Windows	November 6, 2009	Rockstar London	
Bully: Scholarship Edition	Wii	March 4, 2008	Rockstar Toronto	
Bully: Scholarship Edition	Xbox 360	March 4, 2008	Mad Doc Software	
Bully: Scholarship Edition	Windows	October 21, 2008	Rockstar New England	
Grand Theft Auto IV	PlayStation 3	April 29, 2008	Rockstar North	
Grand Theft Auto IV	Xbox 360	April 29, 2008	Rockstar North	
Grand Theft Auto IV	Windows	December 2, 2008	Rockstar Toronto	
Midnight Club: Los Angeles	PlayStation 3	October 21, 2008	Rockstar San Diego	
Midnight Club: Los Angeles	PlayStation Portable	October 21, 2008	Rockstar San Diego	
Midnight Club: Los Angeles	Xbox 360	October 21, 2008	Rockstar San Diego	
Grand Theft Auto IV: The Lost and Damned	Xbox 360	February 17, 2009	Rockstar North	
Grand Theft Auto IV: The Lost and Damned	Windows	April 13, 2010	Rockstar Toronto / Rockstar New England	
Grand Theft Auto IV: The Lost and Damned	PlayStation 3	April 13, 2010	Rockstar North	
Grand Theft Auto: Chinatown Wars	Nintendo DS	March 17, 2009	Rockstar Leeds / Rockstar North	
Grand Theft Auto: Chinatown Wars	PlayStation Portable	October 20, 2009	Rockstar Leeds / Rockstar North	
Grand Theft Auto: Chinatown Wars	iOS	January 18, 2010	War Drum Studios	
Grand Theft Auto: Chinatown Wars	Android	December 18, 2014	War Drum Studios	
Grand Theft Auto: Chinatown Wars	Fire OS	December 18, 2014	War Drum Studios	
Beaterator	iOS	September 29, 2009	Rockstar Leeds	
Beaterator	PlayStation Portable	September 29, 2009	Rockstar Leeds	
Grand Theft Auto: The Ballad of Gay Tony	Xbox 360	October 29, 2009	Rockstar North	
Grand Theft Auto: The Ballad of Gay Tony	Windows	April 13, 2010	Rockstar Toronto / Rockstar New England	
Grand Theft Auto: The Ballad of Gay Tony	PlayStation 3	April 13, 2010	Rockstar North	
Red Dead Redemption	PlayStation 3	May 18, 2010	Rockstar San Diego / Rockstar North / Rockstar Leeds / Rockstar New England	
Red Dead Redemption	Xbox 360	May 18, 2010	Rockstar San Diego / Rockstar North / Rockstar Leeds / Rockstar New England	
Red Dead Redemption	Nintendo Switch	August 17, 2023	Double Eleven	
Red Dead Redemption	PlayStation 4	August 17, 2023	Double Eleven	
Red Dead Redemption	Windows	October 29, 2024	Double Eleven	
Red Dead Redemption	Android	December 2, 2025	Double Eleven / Cast Iron Games	
Red Dead Redemption	iOS	December 2, 2025	Double Eleven / Cast Iron Games	
Red Dead Redemption	Nintendo Switch 2	December 2, 2025	Double Eleven / Cast Iron Games	
Red Dead Redemption	PlayStation 5	December 2, 2025	Double Eleven / Cast Iron Games	
Red Dead Redemption	Xbox Series X/S	December 2, 2025	Double Eleven / Cast Iron Games	
Red Dead Redemption: Undead Nightmare	PlayStation 3	October 26, 2010	Rockstar San Diego	
Red Dead Redemption: Undead Nightmare	Xbox 360	October 26, 2010	Rockstar San Diego	
Red Dead Redemption: Undead Nightmare	Nintendo Switch	August 17, 2023	Double Eleven	
Red Dead Redemption: Undead Nightmare	PlayStation 4	August 17, 2023	Double Eleven	
Red Dead Redemption: Undead Nightmare	Windows	October 29, 2024	Double Eleven	
Red Dead Redemption: Undead Nightmare	Android	December 2, 2025	Double Eleven / Cast Iron Games	
Red Dead Redemption: Undead Nightmare	iOS	December 2, 2025	Double Eleven / Cast Iron Games	
Red Dead Redemption: Undead Nightmare	Nintendo Switch 2	December 2, 2025	Double Eleven / Cast Iron Games	
Red Dead Redemption: Undead Nightmare	PlayStation 5	December 2, 2025	Double Eleven / Cast Iron Games	
Red Dead Redemption: Undead Nightmare	Xbox Series X/S	December 2, 2025	Double Eleven / Cast Iron Games	
L.A. Noire	PlayStation 3	May 17, 2011	Team Bondi / Rockstar North / Rockstar Leeds / Rockstar San Diego / Rockstar New England	
L.A. Noire	Xbox 360	May 17, 2011	Team Bondi / Rockstar North / Rockstar Leeds / Rockstar San Diego / Rockstar New England	
L.A. Noire	Windows	November 8, 2011	Rockstar Leeds	
L.A. Noire	Nintendo Switch	November 14, 2017	Rockstar San Diego / Rockstar Toronto / Rockstar North / Rockstar Leeds / Virtuos	
L.A. Noire	PlayStation 4	November 14, 2017	Rockstar San Diego / Rockstar Toronto / Rockstar North / Rockstar Leeds / Virtuos	
L.A. Noire	Xbox One	November 14, 2017	Rockstar San Diego / Rockstar Toronto / Rockstar North / Rockstar Leeds / Virtuos	
Max Payne 3	PlayStation 3	May 15, 2012	Rockstar Studios	
Max Payne 3	Xbox 360	May 15, 2012	Rockstar Studios	
Max Payne 3	Windows	May 29, 2012	Rockstar Studios	
Max Payne 3	macOS	June 20, 2013	Rockstar Studios	
Grand Theft Auto: iFruit	iOS	September 16, 2013	Rockstar North	
Grand Theft Auto: iFruit	Android	October 28, 2013	Rockstar North	
Grand Theft Auto: iFruit	Windows Phone	November 19, 2013	Rockstar North	
Grand Theft Auto: iFruit	PlayStation Vita	April 2, 2014	Lucid Games	
Grand Theft Auto V	PlayStation 3	September 17, 2013	Rockstar North / Rockstar San Diego / Rockstar Leeds / Rockstar Toronto / Rockstar New England / Rockstar London	
Grand Theft Auto V	Xbox 360	September 17, 2013	Rockstar North / Rockstar San Diego / Rockstar Leeds / Rockstar Toronto / Rockstar New England / Rockstar London	
Grand Theft Auto V	PlayStation 4	November 18, 2014	Rockstar North / Rockstar San Diego / Rockstar Leeds / Rockstar Toronto / Rockstar New England / Rockstar London	
Grand Theft Auto V	Xbox One	November 18, 2014	Rockstar North / Rockstar San Diego / Rockstar Leeds / Rockstar Toronto / Rockstar New England / Rockstar London	
Grand Theft Auto V	Windows	April 14, 2015	Rockstar North / Rockstar San Diego / Rockstar Leeds / Rockstar Toronto / Rockstar New England / Rockstar London	
Grand Theft Auto V	PlayStation 5	March 15, 2022	Rockstar North / Rockstar San Diego / Rockstar Leeds / Rockstar Toronto / Rockstar New England / Rockstar London	
Grand Theft Auto V	Xbox Series X/S	March 15, 2022	Rockstar North / Rockstar San Diego / Rockstar Leeds / Rockstar Toronto / Rockstar New England / Rockstar London	
Grand Theft Auto Online	PlayStation 3	October 1, 2013	Rockstar North	
Grand Theft Auto Online	Xbox 360	October 1, 2013	Rockstar North	
Grand Theft Auto Online	PlayStation 4	November 18, 2014	Rockstar North	
Grand Theft Auto Online	Xbox One	November 18, 2014	Rockstar North	
Grand Theft Auto Online	Windows	April 14, 2015	Rockstar North	
Grand Theft Auto Online	PlayStation 5	March 15, 2022	Rockstar North	
Grand Theft Auto Online	Xbox Series X/S	March 15, 2022	Rockstar North	
Bully: Anniversary Edition	Android	December 8, 2016	War Drum Studios	
Bully: Anniversary Edition	iOS	December 8, 2016	War Drum Studios	
L.A. Noire: The VR Case Files	HTC Vive	December 15, 2017	Video Games Deluxe / Rockstar San Diego / Rockstar Toronto / Rockstar North / Rockstar Leeds / Virtuos	
L.A. Noire: The VR Case Files	Oculus Rift	March 29, 2018	Video Games Deluxe / Rockstar San Diego / Rockstar Toronto / Rockstar North / Rockstar Leeds / Virtuos	
L.A. Noire: The VR Case Files	PlayStation VR	September 24, 2019	Video Games Deluxe / Rockstar San Diego / Rockstar Toronto / Rockstar North / Rockstar Leeds / Virtuos	
Red Dead Redemption 2	PlayStation 4	October 26, 2018	Rockstar Games	
Red Dead Redemption 2	Xbox One	October 26, 2018	Rockstar Games	
Red Dead Redemption 2	Windows	November 5, 2019	Rockstar Games	
Red Dead Redemption 2	Stadia	November 19, 2019	Rockstar Games	
Red Dead Online	PlayStation 4	May 14, 2019	Rockstar Games	
Red Dead Online	Xbox One	May 14, 2019	Rockstar Games	
Red Dead Online	Windows	November 5, 2019	Rockstar Games	
Red Dead Online	Stadia	November 19, 2019	Rockstar Games	
Grand Theft Auto: The Trilogy – The Definitive Edition	Windows	November 11, 2021	Grove Street Games	
Grand Theft Auto: The Trilogy – The Definitive Edition	Nintendo Switch	November 11, 2021	Grove Street Games	
Grand Theft Auto: The Trilogy – The Definitive Edition	PlayStation 4	November 11, 2021	Grove Street Games	
Grand Theft Auto: The Trilogy – The Definitive Edition	PlayStation 5	November 11, 2021	Grove Street Games	
Grand Theft Auto: The Trilogy – The Definitive Edition	Xbox One	November 11, 2021	Grove Street Games	
Grand Theft Auto: The Trilogy – The Definitive Edition	Xbox Series X/S	November 11, 2021	Grove Street Games	
Grand Theft Auto: The Trilogy – The Definitive Edition	Android	December 14, 2023	Video Games Deluxe	
Grand Theft Auto: The Trilogy – The Definitive Edition	iOS	December 14, 2023	Video Games Deluxe	
Grand Theft Auto VI	PlayStation 5	November 19, 2026	Rockstar Games	
Grand Theft Auto VI	Xbox Series X/S	November 19, 2026	Rockstar Games	
Max Payne & Max Payne 2 remakes	Windows	TBA	Remedy Entertainment	
Max Payne & Max Payne 2 remakes	PlayStation 5	TBA	Remedy Entertainment	
Max Payne & Max Payne 2 remakes	Xbox Series X/S	TBA	Remedy Entertainment	

=== Cancelled ===
Title	Platform	Developer(s)	Ref.
Duke Nukem: D-Day	PlayStation 2	n-Space	
We Are the Mods	PlayStation 2 (formerly)	Rockstar Toronto	
We Are the Mods	Xbox 360	Rockstar Toronto	
Agent	PlayStation 3	Rockstar North	
