= Austin Powers Pinball =

2002 video game

- North American PlayStation cover art
- Developer: Wildfire Studios
- Publisher: Gotham Games
- Platforms: PlayStation, Windows
- Release: PlayStation: NA: October 25, 2002; EU: October 25, 2002; Windows: NA: January 29, 2003
- Genre: Pinball
- Modes: Single-player, Multiplayer

Austin Powers Pinball is a pinball-based video game released in 2002 and 2003 for PlayStation and Windows. The game is thematically based on the first two installments in the Austin Powers series of films. It features two playable pinball machines: one for the original movie, Austin Powers: International Man of Mystery, and one for the second movie, Austin Powers: The Spy Who Shagged Me. The third film, Austin Powers in Goldmember, was released months before Pinball but is not featured.

Austin Powers Pinball is the fourth video game in the Austin Powers series, following the PC game Austin Powers Operation: Trivia, Game Boy Color tie-ins Austin Powers: Oh, Behave!, and Austin Powers: Welcome to My Underground Lair!. It received mixed reviews upon release.

== Gameplay ==
Dr. Evil is determined on defeating Austin once and for all, and the most effective way to end the threat this time is by accumulating points on the pinball table. Using the flippers, the player can destroy the fembots, escape the mutant sea bass, and more. If the player makes it to the Moonbase Showdown, they will take on the toughest enemies.

== Development and release ==
On December 19, 2002, Global Star Software announced Austin Powers Pinball for a February 2003 release on PC. Copies of this version, developed by Wildfire Studios, were shipped by January 30, 2003.

== Reception ==
Reception

Aggregate score
Aggregator	Score
GameRankings	(PC) 51% (PS) 43%

Review scores
Publication	Score
GameZone	4/10
Official U.S. PlayStation Magazine	2/5
PC Gamer (US)	46%

The game was met with mixed reception. In a January 2003 review by Sam Kennedy of Official U.S. PlayStation Magazine, Kennedy stated that Austin Powers Pinball "does an adequate job of representing a real pinball machine" and called the controls "spot-on." He lamented that "what's really missing here is the humor of the films [...] Everything fits, but there's no wit or excitement. Even the music, though Austin Powers-ish, seems stale." GameRankings gave it a score of 51% for the PC version, and 43% for the PlayStation version.
