= Montezuma's Revenge (video game) =

1984 video game

- Commodore 64 cover
- Developer: Utopia Software
- Publisher: Parker Brothers
- Designer: Robert Jaeger
- Platforms: Apple II, Atari 2600, Atari 5200, Atari 8-bit, ColecoVision, Commodore 64, IBM PC, Master System; As Panama Joe: ZX Spectrum
- Release: NA: 1984
- Genre: Platform
- Mode: Single-player

Montezuma's Revenge is a platform game for the Atari 8-bit computers, Atari 2600, Atari 5200, Apple II, ColecoVision, Commodore 64, IBM PC (as a self-booting disk), and ZX Spectrum (as Panama Joe). It was designed and programmed by Robert Jaeger and published by Parker Brothers in 1984. The game's title references a colloquial expression for diarrhea contracted while visiting Mexico.

In 1988, a port was published for the Master System, which retains the basic gameplay and level structure, but with improved graphics, sound, and additional features.

A substantially updated version entitled Montezuma's Revenge - Director's Cut was released in 2025. This version updates stages, added new features, and allowed the player to fight King Montezuma as a final boss.

== Gameplay ==
Gameplay screenshot (Atari 8-bit)

The player controls a character called Panama Joe (a.k.a. Pedro), moving him from room to room in the labyrinthine underground pyramid of the 16th century Aztec temple of emperor Montezuma II, filled with enemies, obstacles, traps, and dangers. The objective is to score points by gathering jewels and killing enemies. Panama Joe must find keys to open doors, collect and use equipment such as torches, swords, amulets, etc., and avoid or defeat the challenges in his path. Obstacles are laser gates, conveyor belts, disappearing floors and fire pits.

Movement is achieved by jumping, running, sliding down poles, and climbing chains and ladders. Enemies are skulls, snakes, and spiders. The player has a limited number of inventory slots for carrying items, and cannot collect any other items or jewels if all slots are filled. A further complication arises in the bottom-most floors of each pyramid, which must be played in total darkness unless a torch is found.

The pyramid is nine floors deep, not counting the topmost entry room that the player drops into at the start of each level, and has 99 rooms to explore. The goal is to reach the Treasure Chamber through the entrance in the center room of the lowest level. Upon entry, the player has a short time to jump from one chain to another and pick up as many jewels as possible. However, jumping onto a fireman's pole will immediately take the player to the next level; when time runs out, the player is automatically thrown onto the pole.

There are nine difficulty levels in all. Though the basic layout of the pyramid remains the same from one level to the next, small changes in details force the player to rethink their strategy. These changes include:

- Blocking or opening up certain paths (by adding/removing walls or ladders)
- Adding enemies and obstacles
- Rearrangement of items
- More dark rooms and fewer torches (in level 9, the entire pyramid is dark)
- Enemies that do not disappear after they kill Panama Joe (starting with level 5)

The player can reach only the left half of the pyramid in level 1, and only the right half in level 2. Starting with level 3, the entire pyramid is open for exploration.

== Development ==
Robert Jaeger had previously written Chomper (a Pac-Man clone) and Pinhead (a Kick Man clone) for the Atari 800 computer. In 1983, Jaeger's friend Mark Sunshine suggested Jaeger make a game with a Meso-American theme and call it Montezuma's Revenge. Jaeger, who was only 16 at the time, developed the game on an Atari 800 and exhibited the still-unfinished game with his father at a Consumer Electronics Show in 1983. At the time, the game lacked proper ending, featuring a gigantic King Montezuma as a boss who can stomp the player character to death but cannot be defeated; the game's labyrinth was also unfinished with half of its rooms being empty. The prototype game contained an animated title sequence, accompanied by a rendition of "Spanish Flea" as a placeholder music, with Mark Sunshine being credited on-screen for the concept.

Parker Brothers officials expressed interest and quickly convinced Jaeger to sign the rights over to them. The original prototype that Jaeger developed required 48 KB of RAM and a disk drive. Parker Brothers decided to convert the game to cartridge format, to allow it to reach a wider audience of computer owners with 16 KB of RAM and no disk drives, and to convert the game to the Atari 5200 console. The conversion was performed by Bob Halliday and Charlie Sebor of Base Two. The developers finished the game and replaced the unfinished boss sequence with a final treasure room, introduced levels with increasing difficulty, and also removed several minor gameplay features, including the animated title screen, to fit the game in a 16 KB cartridge.

Parker Brothers released versions for the ColecoVision, Atari 2600, and Atari 5200 consoles, and for the Apple II, Commodore 64, IBM PC, and Atari 8-bit computers. To reduce costs, Parker Brothers released the Commodore 64 and Atari 8-bit versions on disk instead of cartridge. In the UK and Ireland, it was also released on cassette tape for the Atari and Commodore 64 . The C64 and Atari versions came on a single flippy disk–likewise for the IBM PC and Apple II versions.

The IBM PC port uses a CPU-based speed loop and is too fast to be playable on 286 and up machines. A cassette tape version was developed separately in the UK for the Sinclair Spectrum. The Atari 2600 cartridge is 8K and has half the levels of the other versions.

== Reception ==
From contemporary reviews, The Video Game Update described the game as "exciting and frustrating", explaining that "There's nothing more endearing to a dedicated game player than the challenge of beating a seemingly impossible situation, of finding just one more chamber, or of discovering the perfect combination of moves to reach a formerly unreachable object. Montezuma's Revenge provides just this kind of challenge."

Computer and Video Games rated the ColecoVision version 87% in 1989.

The games sold over 600,000 copies by 1997.

== Legacy ==
In 1998, a 3D first-person game was developed for Microsoft Windows by Utopia Technologies called Montezuma's Return! A 2D version for the Game Boy and Game Boy Color was developed by Tarantula Studios.

An enhanced version of Montezuma's Revenge was released for iOS and Android.

A reviewer for the GamesTM magazine called Montezuma's Revenge an early example of what later became known as the Metroidvania genre.

Atari 2600 games were used as challenges for Artificial intelligence researchers. In 2013, progress was made on general algorithms which could learn to play multiple games, but they failed on Montezuma's Revenge and Pitfall!. In 2018, researchers from OpenAI made progress on Montezuma's Revenge. Later in the year, Uber developed Go-Explore, a new approach to reinforcement learning, which could easily handle both games.

A remake titled Montezuma’s Revenge 40th Anniversary Edition was released on 16 January 2025. Robert Jaeger was involved with the production. A previously unreleased Director’s Cut version of the original game was announced as part of this remake. This Director's Cut is available as part of Montezuma's Revenge - The 40th Anniversary Deluxe Edition.
