= Pinball World =

1995 video game

- box for 1995 European release
- Developer: Spidersoft
- Publisher: 21st Century Entertainment
- Platforms: original release: DOS 2014 release: Linux, Windows
- Release: 1995

Pinball World is a 1995 video game from 21st Century Entertainment.

In 2014 GoG released a version for Linux.

== Gameplay ==
part of "Far East" table

Pinball World has a world travel motif with players going through nine main themed tables based on the United Kingdom, Germany, Africa, Australia, Far East, New York, Hollywood, South America, and the North Pole. The player does not plunge the ball, instead it appears in the middle of the table. An animation or skill-based mini-game is played between tables.

All tables scroll vertically, with wider tables also scrolling horizontally.

== Reception ==
Reception

Review scores
Publication	Score
Computer Gaming World	2/5
Joystick	50%
PC Joker	68%
PC Player	68%
Software Gids	35/50

Computer Gaming World said "Although Pinball World gives you 20 tables, while more extravagant pinball games usually offer only four or five, in overall appearance this game just can't compete with the more sophisticated titles. So, unless you've exhausted the other options, you might want to pass on it"

Software Gids found the graphics to be lackluster, and while the music from the CD was good, that played through the soundcard was mediocre. The ball physics were called merely passable, and the game was not a pinball simulator.
