= Austin Powers =

American film series

- Directed by: Jay Roach
- Written by: Mike Myers; Michael McCullers (2–3)
- Produced by: Mike Myers; Demi Moore; Jennifer Todd; Suzanne Todd
- Starring: Mike Myers; Elizabeth Hurley; Michael York; Seth Green; Heather Graham; Mindy Sterling; Robert Wagner; Verne Troyer; Beyoncé Knowles; Michael Caine
- Music by: George S. Clinton
- Distributed by: Warner Bros. Pictures (through New Line Cinema)
- Running time: 286 minutes
- Country: United States
- Language: English
- Budget: $112.5 million
- Box office: $676.3 million

Austin Powers is a series of American satirical spy comedy films created by Mike Myers, who stars as the British spy Austin Powers as well as his arch-nemesis, Dr. Evil. The series consists of International Man of Mystery (1997), The Spy Who Shagged Me (1999) and Goldmember (2002), all of which were directed by Jay Roach, and co-produced and released by New Line Cinema.

The series is a satire of numerous films and characters, particularly the James Bond series and Jason King, and incorporates many other elements of popular culture as it follows a British spy's quest to bring down his nemesis. The character of Powers represents an archetype of the late 1960s Swinging London, with his advocacy of free love, his use of obscure impressions, and his clothing style. The films also poke fun at the outrageous plots, rampant sexual innuendo, and one-dimensional stock characters associated with 1960s spy films.

== Development ==
Myers himself has stated in interviews that the idea for Austin Powers came to him one night while driving home from ice hockey practice. Hearing the song "The Look of Love" by Burt Bacharach on his car radio, he wondered "Where have all the swingers gone?" and conceived the character who would become Austin Powers.

In an interview in November 2018 with Access Hollywood, Myers stated, "After my dad died in 1991, I was taking stock of his influence on me as a person and his influence on me with comedy in general. So Austin Powers was a tribute to my father, who [introduced me to] James Bond, Peter Sellers, The Beatles, The Goodies, Peter Cook and Dudley Moore."

The Austin Powers character first appeared in the band Ming Tea, with Myers as Powers, Susanna Hoffs as Jillian Shagwell, and Matthew Sweet as Sid Belvedere. Myers' wife Robin Ruzan said Myers should write a movie based on Powers.

The first phrase he thought the character might say was "Do I make you horny?", which later did indeed become a catchphrase for the character. He has also disclosed that the character also draws on his recollections of former Radio Caroline DJ Simon Dee, who hosted the first real television chat show in the United Kingdom in 1967, which ended with his driving off in a sports car with a young blonde in the passenger seat. An important inspiration for the series is British super spy James Bond. Myers said of Bond: "I can't even tell you how huge it was in our house ... That's really why I wanted to do Austin Powers. Austin Powers is out of pure love for James Bond."

Though Myers is Canadian by birth, his parents are natives of Liverpool, England, and Myers holds dual nationality. Although the films parody the plots and characters of 1960s spy movies and the Swinging London fashion scene of the era, the humour is influenced by Myers's British heritage, particularly the Carry On films and the comedic works of Benny Hill and Peter Sellers, the latter of whom Myers is a self confessed fan (his favorite films being the Bond spoof Casino Royale and The Party).

Austin Powers is everything I watched (on TV in the late sixties). My parents were from Liverpool, and there's no one more English than an Englishman who no longer lives there. Every molecule of British culture that came across the Atlantic was tasted and worshipped.

— Mike Myers

Powers' bad teeth were created by Los Angeles dental technician Gary Archer. Myers came to Archer and told him: "I want bad British 1960s teeth", based on a widely held stereotype. Archer took pictures of expat patrons at an English pub that he frequented in the San Fernando Valley, made sketches, and showed Myers the design. Myers told him that he had "nailed it".

Influences from Sellers' films are apparent throughout the series; the character of Austin Powers reflects the inspiration of Sellers' portrayal of the character Robert Danvers in the 1970 film There's a Girl in My Soup. Myers states Powers' dandyish appearance was also inspired by that of Jason King – the adventurous character (played by Peter Wyngarde) from the ITV Spy fi series Department S who was featured in the eponymous spin off series. Myers was also influenced by the comedy troupe Monty Python, with film critic Robbie Collin writing "the Austin Powers series chugs along on Pythonisms."

Other obviously apparent influences are the BBC's Adam Adamant Lives! television series, whose protagonist was a Victorian era spy, who was frozen in 1902, and then revived in the year 1966; The 1965 James Bond parody Dr. Goldfoot and the Bikini Machine, in which a mad scientist builds a small army of attractive female robots; the Matt Helm series of films starring Dean Martin; the Derek Flint movies starring James Coburn; The Beatles films, The Monkees television series, and the "cocktail party" skits from Rowan & Martin's Laugh-In. Powers was also influenced by the secret agent Harry Palmer (played by Michael Caine in three films, beginning with the 1965 film The Ipcress File), especially Caine's thick horn-rimmed glasses. Caine himself starred in Austin Powers in Goldmember (2002), with his portrayal of Nigel Powers, father of Austin Powers, spoofing Harry Palmer.

== Cast ==
Actor	Films			Commercial	
Actor	Austin Powers: International Man of Mystery	Austin Powers: The Spy Who Shagged Me	Austin Powers in Goldmember	Wood Wheaton Supercentre: Dr. EVil – GM Superbowl Commercial	Verizon: Menace Mobile – Dr Evil Returns!
Actor	1997	1999	2002	2022	2026
Mike Myers	Austin Powers	Austin Powers	Austin Powers		
Mike Myers	Dr. Evil	Dr. Evil	Dr. Evil	Dr. Evil	Dr. Evil
Mike Myers		Fat Bastard	Fat Bastard		
Mike Myers			Goldmember		
Michael York	Basil Exposition	Basil Exposition	Basil Exposition		
Robert Wagner	Number 2				
Rob Lowe	John's friend (Bill)^{C}	Young Number 2		Number 2	
Mindy Sterling	Frau Farbissina	Frau Farbissina	Frau Farbissina	Frau Farbissina	Frau Farbissina
Seth Green	Scott Evil	Scott Evil	Scott Evil	Scott Evil	Scott Evil
Will Ferrell	Mustafa	Mustafa			
Verne Troyer		Mini-Me	Mini-Me		
Elizabeth Hurley	Vanessa Kensington	Vanessa Kensington^{C}			
Heather Graham		Felicity Shagwell			
Beyoncé Knowles			Foxxy Cleopatra		
Michael Caine			Nigel Powers		

== Crew ==
Credit	Austin Powers: International Man of Mystery	Austin Powers: The Spy Who Shagged Me	Austin Powers in Goldmember
Credit	1997	1999	2002
Director	Jay Roach		
Producers	Mike Myers, Demi Moore, Jennifer Todd & Suzanne Todd	Mike Myers, Demi Moore, Eric McLeod, Jennifer Todd, John S. Lyons & Suzanne Todd	
Writers	Mike Myers	Mike Myers & Michael McCullers	
Composer	George S. Clinton		
Cinematographer	Peter Deming	Ueli Steiger	Peter Deming
Editors	Dawn Hoggatt & Debra Neil-Fisher	Jon Poll & Debra Neil-Fisher	Jon Poll & Greg Hayden
Production company	Eric's Boy; Moving Pictures; Capella International	Eric's Boy; Team Todd; Moving Pictures	Team Todd; Moving Pictures; Gratitude International
Distributor	New Line Cinema		

== Cars ==
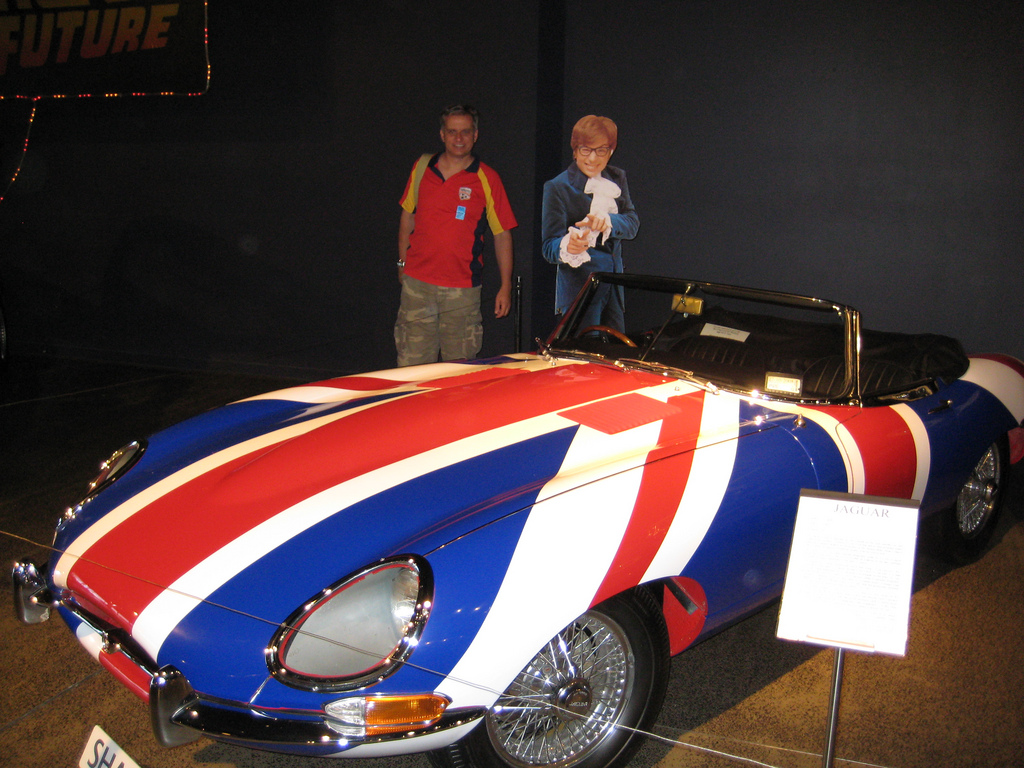
Powers' "Shaguar"

The series featured two cars with license plates reading "SWINGER" and "SWINGER2" and collectively dubbed the "Shaguars" that were portrayed by a 1961 Jaguar E-Type and a 2001 Jaguar XK8 convertible, with a Union Jack paint scheme. The Ministry of Defence creates two cars to transport Powers through time: a psychedelic rainbow painted 1999 Volkswagen "New Beetle" convertible in the second film, and a purple 1975 Cadillac Eldorado Fleetwood "pimpmobile" (license plate "SWNGR 3") in the third.

In the second film, Felicity Shagwell drives a 1965 Chevrolet Corvette with an American flag paint scheme. In the third, Nigel Powers has a 2001 Mini Cooper which can travel underwater, and which bears the license plate "GR8 SHAG".

== Reception ==
=== Box office performance ===
Film	Release date	Box office revenue			Box office ranking		Budget	Ref.
Film	Release date	United States	Foreign	Worldwide	All time domestic	All time worldwide	Budget	Ref.
Austin Powers: International Man of Mystery	May 2, 1997	$53,883,989	$13,800,000	$67,683,989	#1,171		$16.5–18 million	
Austin Powers: The Spy Who Shagged Me	June 11, 1999	$206,040,086	$105,976,772	$312,016,858	#119 and #152 (Note: Adjusted totals based on current ticket prices by Box Office Mojo.)	#257	$33 million	
Austin Powers in Goldmember	July 26, 2002	$213,307,889	$83,347,542	$296,655,431	#110 and #188	#283	$63 million	
Total		$473,231,964	$203,124,314	$676,356,278			$112.5 million	

=== Critical response ===
Film	Rotten Tomatoes	Metacritic	CinemaScore
Austin Powers: International Man of Mystery	73% (70 reviews)	51 (25 reviews)	B−
Austin Powers: The Spy Who Shagged Me	53% (90 reviews)	59 (34 reviews)	B+
Austin Powers in Goldmember	52% (186 reviews)	62 (34 reviews)	B+

== Media ==
=== Films ===
The series consists of three films:

- Austin Powers: International Man of Mystery released on May 2, 1997
- Austin Powers: The Spy Who Shagged Me released on June 11, 1999
- Austin Powers in Goldmember released on July 26, 2002

=== Television ===
- Austin Powers' Electric Psychedelic Pussycat Swingers Club aired April 1997

=== Games ===
==== Video games ====
- Austin Powers Operation: Trivia (PC, Macintosh, 1999)
- Austin Powers: Oh, Behave! (Game Boy Color, 2000)
- Austin Powers: Welcome to My Underground Lair! (Game Boy Color, 2000)
- Austin Powers Pinball (PlayStation and PC, 2002)
- Austin Powers: Mojo Rally (Dreamcast, Cancelled)

==== Other ====
- Austin Powers, a ticket redemption game by Sega Pinball (1997)
- Austin Powers Collectible Card Game by Decipher Inc (1999)
- Austin Powers (pinball) (Stern Pinball, 2001)

== Cancelled animated series ==
HBO purchased the rights to produce an animated series based on the Austin Powers films in May 1999. Despite announcing plans for a thirteen-episode season, HBO ultimately shelved the project. Writer Donick Cary originally left The Simpsons after writing the first draft of the first segment of the eleventh season episode "Treehouse of Horror X" to work on the Austin Powers cartoon.

== Possible fourth film ==
In an interview in October of 2005, with Entertainment Weekly, Mike Myers discussed the possibility of studio sources moving forward with a fourth film: "There is hope! We're all circling and talking to each other. I miss doing the characters."

In May 2007, in an interview with IGN, Myers was asked "So no more Austin Powers?". He replied: "No, no, there is a fully conceived idea for a fourth and I can just say that it's from Dr. Evil's point of view. So if you balanced how much of it was Austin with Dr. Evil, it's more about Dr. Evil than Austin". In the audio commentary from the DVD release of Austin Powers in Goldmember, Myers revealed that in the fourth film, Fat Bastard would return and regain the weight that he lost in Goldmember. He also said that he would start work on it after he finished work on The Love Guru, which became a box office bomb. In February 2008, it was announced that Jay Roach would return as director. In April 2008, it was reported that Gisele Bündchen had been offered a role in the film.

However, Seth Green, who played Scott Evil, stated that there was no script at the moment and that Austin Powers 4 would be made if a script is written and approved. In June 2008, in an interview, when asked about another Austin Powers film, Myers stated, "I have an idea, and again it's one of those things that will emerge or it won't." In July 2008, Mike Myers stated that he had begun writing Austin Powers 4, and that the plot is "really about Dr. Evil and his son."

Jay Roach indicated in March 2010 to MTV that Myers is working on ideas for a fourth film. In August 2011, Mike Myers revealed he would return, and had begun writing a script for a fourth installment. In September 2013, when asked about the future of Austin Powers, Myers answered "I'm still figuring that out." In September 2015, Verne Troyer expressed his desire to return as Mini-Me if he was asked to do so.

In May 2016, Roach was asked about the fourth Austin Powers film during an interview with Larry King, and he stated the ideas for the fourth film that he and Myers have are good and interesting. In August 2016, in a telephone interview, Mike Myers stated "Everything is being negotiated and worked out and all that stuff" regarding the fourth installment of the Austin Powers film series.

As the 20th anniversary approached in April 2017, for Austin Powers: International Man of Mystery, Myers claimed: "I would love to do another, but you just have to see". Two days later, Roach stated that a fourth film would only occur if Myers creates a good story for it. In May 2017, Troyer stated that Mini-Me would reveal that he can speak in the fourth movie. On April 5, 2018, Myers reprised his role as Dr. Evil on a segment of The Tonight Show Starring Jimmy Fallon complaining about having been dismissed from a Cabinet post in the Trump administration, raising speculation that a fourth film was in development. Following the death of Verne Troyer on April 21, 2018, questions have been raised about the potential for a fourth film without the character of Mini-Me, or with the part recast. Roach claimed in an interview that a fourth Austin Powers film may not be possible without Troyer.

In May 2018, Myers reiterated his interest in making a fourth Austin Powers, stating that it would be fun, also hinting that some tribute to Troyer might be included. In November 2018, Myers stated that the project's future is "looking good" with the script already written and that Austin Powers and Dr. Evil will return soon, citing his parenthood as the reason for how long the delays in development in the film have lasted and that Roach will most likely reprise his directorial duties.

Roach again indicated in January 2020 that he was interested in doing a fourth film. In February 2022, Myers told The Today Show he "would love to do" a fourth Austin Powers movie but could "neither confirm nor deny" whether it would be made.

In October 2022, Myers stated on the Tonight Show that he would "love" to make another Austin Powers film, again citing parenting as the main reason as to why the film has not yet been made.

Myers said in an interview December 2024, that a fourth film in the Austin Powers franchise would more likely than not be happening sometime very soon stating he would be "very surprised" if the film doesn't get materialized.

In June 2026, when asked by a fan on Trevor Noah’s World Cup Watch Party about the possibility of a fourth film, Myers responded "yes," but did not elaborate any further.

On July 6, 2026, Myers posted on Instagram confirming the fourth movie was "coming soon".

== Social concerns ==
The Austin Powers films have attracted controversy for their adult content while receiving the less-restricted PG-13-rating in the United States, prior to critics' protests against the MPAA's ratings in 2010. Nell Minow of Common Sense Media expressed concern about the films exposing minors to explicit sexual content. In Malaysia, the films were regarded to be almost pornographic; The Spy Who Shagged Me was banned from being screened, while Goldmember was released with the 18SX-rating.
