= Cliffhanger (video game) =

1993 video game

- North American NES cover artwork featuring Sylvester Stallone as Ranger Gabriel "Gabe" Walker
- Developers: Spidersoft (NES, Game Boy, Game Gear, Amiga); Malibu Interactive (SNES, Genesis, Sega CD)
- Publishers: Sony Imagesoft; Psygnosis (Amiga) Virgin Games, Infogrames
- Composers: Brian Howarth (SNES); Dave Lowe (Game Gear); Graham Gray (Amiga); Mark Cooksey (NES); Martin Walker (Game Boy); Eric Hammond (Genesis/Sega CD)
- Platforms: Amiga, Genesis, Sega CD, SNES, NES, Game Boy, Game Gear
- Release: Super NES: NA: October 1993; NES, Genesis, Sega CD: NA: November 1993; EU: February 4, 1994
- Genres: Platform game, beat 'em up
- Mode: Single-player

Two beat 'em up platform video games based on the film Cliffhanger (1993) were released in 1993. One was developed by Spidersoft for the Nintendo Entertainment System (NES), Game Boy, Game Gear and Amiga. Another was developed by Malibu Interactive for the Super Nintendo Entertainment System (SNES), Sega Genesis, and Sega CD. Sony Imagesoft published all except the Amiga version, which was published by Psygnosis.

== Plot ==
A plane filled with terrorists attempting to steal money from a treasury plane while airborne is shot down by an FBI plane. The terrorists survive and send out a distress signal, to which the main character, Gabe, responds. However, Gabe does not know that the mayday signal is coming from a group of terrorists, and after reaching them, the terrorists capture Gabe's partner, Hal, and hold him hostage. Gabe must then set out and retrieve the money in order to save Hal.

== Gameplay ==
The game begins with Gabe responding to the call, before Hal being captured. In order to progress through the game, the player must watch out for enemies and either avoid them by jumping or defeat them by attacking with various weapons, such as a knife or a gun. There are also bosses after every few levels, the final boss being Qualen, the leader of the terrorist group. In some versions of the game the player can also collect money bags scattered throughout the levels to increase their game score, up to the possible maximum of 958845.

== Versions ==
There are major gameplay differences between the Spidersoft versions (largely released on 8-bit consoles like the NES and the Game Boy, but also the Amiga port) and the Malibu Interactive versions (largely released on 16-bit consoles). The Genesis/Mega Drive, SNES and Sega CD versions are almost identical and feature gameplay similar to street brawlers like Double Dragon and Final Fight. The Sega CD version contains a 3D snowboarding sequence where the player has to escape from an avalanche. Otherwise the gameplay on the 16-Bit systems is the same across the board. The Amiga, NES, Game Boy and Game Gear versions however contain lower resolution graphics and a simpler side scrolling gameplay.

== Reception ==
Spidersoft versions

Review scores
Publication	Score
AllGame	1/5 (NES)
Electronic Gaming Monthly	3/10 (NES)
Amiga World	F (Amiga)

Malibu Interactive versions

Review scores
Publication	Score	
Publication	Sega Genesis	SNES
Electronic Gaming Monthly	N/A	6/10, 5/10, 4/10, 4/10
Game Players	N/A	4/10
Hyper	64/100	64/100
M! Games	48% 54% (CD)	48%
Mega	29%	N/A
Play Time	72/100	N/A

In their review of the Super NES version, Electronic Gaming Monthly deemed the game a poor Double Dragon clone, citing a lack of originality, poor controls, tiresome gameplay, and below average graphics. They were even more condemning of the NES version, saying that the controls suffer from a delay, the soundtrack is grating, and the graphics look like they're from one of the first wave of NES games. Reviewing the Sega CD version, GamePro criticized that the five platforming levels are repetitive to the point of monotony, praised the two snowboarding levels as "extremely challenging and fun", and complained at the game being weighted more towards the platforming levels than the snowboarding levels. Peter Olafson savaged the Amiga version with an "F" score, writing that it was the "worst major-label Amiga game I've ever seen".

In a retrospective review of the NES version AllGame editor Christopher Michael Baker was heavily critical of the game, calling it "one of the worst gaming experiences you'll ever encounter on any system". Baker criticized the graphics and controls, and referred to it as a "disgrace to video games".

The game was awarded Worst Movie-to-Game of 1994 by Electronic Gaming Monthly. Mega said it was "a truly disgusting piece of software".

== Legacy ==
In December 2012 programmer Chris Shrigley, who worked on the Sega Genesis version, released the source code for educational purposes to the public.
