= Poker Face Paul =

- Developers: Spidersoft (Blackjack, Solitaire); Adrenalin Entertainment (Poker, Gin)
- Publisher: Sega of America
- Platform: Game Gear
- Release: NA: 1994
- Genre: Sports (cards)
- Modes: Single-player, multiplayer

Poker Face Paul is a series of four video games for Game Gear that simulates various card games, all released in 1994. The individual games are Poker Face Paul's Blackjack, Poker Face Paul's Gin, Poker Face Paul's Poker, and Poker Face Paul's Solitaire.

== Development ==
Blackjack and Solitaire were developed by Spidersoft, with both games taking twenty-five days each to be completed.

== Reception ==
Reception

Review score
Publication	Score
Electronic Gaming Monthly	5/10, 6/10, 5/10, 5/10 (Blackjack)

In their July 1994 issue GamePro reviewed all of the Poker Face Paul games except Gin. They gave Poker a mostly negative review and outright panned both Blackjack and Solitaire, remarking that all three games suffer from poor graphics and sounds, and that aside from Poker they offer less fun than can be had by playing the game with a real deck of cards, which also cost far less than a Game Gear cartridge.

Electronic Gaming Monthly's four were lukewarm to the game with one happy that it taught them basics of Blackjack, while another said users would be better off with a pair of cards.
