= Tunguska: Legend of Faith =

- Developer: Exortus GmbH
- Publisher: Project Two Interactive
- Platforms: Windows, PlayStation
- Release: PAL: October 27, 2000
- Genre: Action-adventure

Tunguska: Legend of Faith (Russian: Тунгусский синдром) is an action-adventure video game by German-based studio Exortus GmbH, released on PC (Windows 9x) and later PlayStation. It received largely negative reviews from critics.

== Plot and gameplay ==
The game is set in a fantasy world that incorporates elements of medieval culture. After having been executed by electric chair, the player character, Jack Riley, unexpectedly wakes up in a castle in Tunguska, the site of a mysterious meteor impact rumored to have otherworldly causes. Riley decides to explore the castle, fighting various monsters and investigating the area's mysteries.

Players move from screen to screen while the camera changes accordingly. The game's combat is inspired by arcade video games; players fight using a combination of the arrow keys, shift, and control.

== Production ==
The title's music was recorded at B & T Records studio. The game was previewed at E3 1999.

The Windows version was released in the United States in 1998 by Project Two Interactive, while a Russian version was localised and released by Amber Company in 1999 (alongside Liath: WorldSpiral). It was released in Poland by LK Avalon on October 12, 1998. The PlayStation version was released in France on December 20, 1999, by Take-Two Interactive, and in Germany by the same publisher in 2000.

== Critical reception ==
Game Reactor harshly criticized the game as obsolete and lacking in innovation. Przygodoskop described the title as "master-shit". IGN noted the game's action is very hard and that players should take time to navigate its controls and techniques in order to achieve competency and progress. Meristation felt that it wasn't particularly impressive but that it my be appealing to fans of the genre. PC World Poland felt that negative aspects included the dynamism of the camera and the lack of handling with the player character. VR Games panned the "boring and monotonous gameplay" and "unbalanced and rather inconvenient controls". Game Sector, noting that by 2001 Tunguska was in the bargain bin, said the game illustrated the phrase 'you get what you paid for'. Gamer.no examined the game as part of a 2004 article entitled 'Is cheap good?', and noted the pleasure gained from now bad certain aspects were. Computer Inform did appreciate the full Russiafication of the game. Fatal Game deemed it an amateur title. Game.exe thought the game was an unpleasant mix of Myst-like games and Virtua Fighter-like games. Gambler Magazine deemed the quality as "a little bit over average". SuperJuegos lamented that the game had few opportunities to interact with the environment, and that there no characters with which to share engage in a dialogue.

In a rare positive review, PC Action compared the game to Alone in the Dark and complimented its "sophisticated, yet logical puzzles". Planet PLaystation noted in a preview that in opposition to Resident Evil, the game's camera the will scroll in the player's direction quickly and smoothly, without "detaching". PC Joker described it as a "playful mix of Resident Evil and Virtua Fighter.

== See also ==
- Tunguska event in fiction
