= Pinball Builder =

1996 video game

- Developer: Spidersoft
- Publisher: 21st Century Entertainment
- Platform: Windows
- Release: November 1996
- Genre: Home

Pinball Builder, also known as Pinball Builder: A Construction Kit for Windows is a 1996 video game from 21st Century Entertainment.

== Gameplay ==
Pinball Builder is a creative simulation tool that empowers players to design and play their own custom pinball tables. Gameplay begins with a conceptual phase, encouraging players to imagine their ideal layout. From there, users choose one of 32 base configurations pre-equipped with ramps, flippers, and side guards. Through an intuitive drag-and-drop interface, players can place additional components like bumpers, kickers, lights, and drop targets—each available in a wide range of designs and styles. Customization goes further, as the game supports imported graphics, MIDI music, and sound effects. A bundled copy of PaintShop Pro allows players to craft unique artwork for their tables. Gameplay parameters are also adjustable, including table angle, ball speed, number of players, and multi-ball settings. Once assembled, players can test their creations using the game's built-in play mode, which supports five resolutions and both scrolling and static screens. The package also includes eight completed tables for immediate play. Tables can be shared via disk or internet, with standout designs featured monthly by the developer.

== Development ==
The game released on a CD-ROM and could run tables in Windows or DOS, but the table editor only ran on Windows.

An upgrade was planned, but never released.

== Reception ==
Reception

Review scores
Publication	Score
GameSpot	6.8/10
Gamezilla	58/100
PC Games	53%
PC Player	2/5

Gamezilla said "Pinball Builder is a great idea, hearkening back to...Pinball Construction Set on the Apple II and Commodore 64. Building your own tables is fun and the game has a lot of potential, but it fails to live up to it due to the many bugs and design problems"

GameSpot found the game to be sluggish on computers with minimum system requirements. A bug with ball speed was found on certain graphics cards. The ability to run tables created by other users was praised.
