= Pool Hustler =

1998 video game

- Developer: Ornith
- Publishers: JP: ASK; WW: Activision
- Composer: Jun Washida
- Platform: PlayStation
- Release: JP: May 21, 1998; NA: September 30, 1998; EU: August 1999
- Genre: Sports
- Modes: Single-player, multiplayer

Pool Hustler, known in Japan as Dōkyū: Billiard Master (撞球 ビリヤード・マスター, Dōkyū Biriyādo Masutā), and in Europe as Pool Palace, is a video game developed by Ornith and published by ASK and Activision for PlayStation in 1998. A sequel to the game, entitled Q-Ball: Billiards Master, was released for PlayStation 2 in 2000.

== Characters ==
- (United States) Joseph (or known as Joe)
  - Born into a traditional working-class family, Joe has faced an uphill battle since childhood. Quick to anger, Joe plays an impatient game of pool. His straight-forward style uses center ball hits almost exclusively. He does have raw power though, so be careful not to let him build up steam. If you play him intelligently, you should be able to beat him regularly.
- (South Korea) Yung
  - Yung is a college student from Seoul studying at a university in Central City through an exchange program. With a famous pool player for a father, Yung naturally learned to handle a cue at an early age. Although she doesn't have much power in her stroke, Yung makes up for it with a soft touch on the ball. She also has a good grasp of the fundamentals. She should offer a good challenge.
- (United States) Elizabeth (or known as Liz)
  - Liz runs a pool bar in Central City. She dyed her hair bright red after splitting up with her husband eight years ago. It was a messy divorce. A bitter legal battle gave Liz the pool bar she now runs. Her personality and style of play are every bit as wild as her appearance. Watch yourself.
- (Jamaica) Morgan
  - Having learned to play pool as a way of killing time while serving a 35-year prison sentence, Morgan has a certain disdain for people who take pool seriously. He has a very strange shooting style that might lead one to believe that he is just goofing around. Don't let him fool you—he's playing to win.
- (United States) Timothy (or known as Tim)
- (United Kingdom) Mario
- (Australia) Samuel (or known as Sam)
- (United States) Sarah
- (United Kingdom) Nelson
- (United States) Nicholas (or known as Nico)
- (Italy) Roberto Bettini (or known as Robi)
  - Otherwise, in Japan, he was known as Theodore Marchione (or Theo).
- (France) Serge
  - Serge is used to be known as the King of Pool. He lived in the residence of the Bettini family where Roberto lives in Williamsburg at Central City. His skills are pretty impossible to aim, and he gets his opportunity to win a single game. To show him that you beat Serge, he says, "The truth is, being called the King of Pool was getting somewhat tiresome."

== Trivia ==
- In the billiards lesson mode, Yoshikazu Kimura appears as the instructor on the Japanese release. Roberto appears as the instructor on the North American and European release.

== Reception ==
Reception

Aggregate score
Aggregator	Score
GameRankings	69%

Review scores
Publication	Score
AllGame	3/5
CNET Gamecenter	7/10
Electronic Gaming Monthly	6.25/10 (Note: In Electronic Gaming Monthly's review of the game, two critics gave it each a score of 7/10, one gave it 5/10, and the other gave it 6/10.)
EP Daily	4.5/10
Famitsu	28/40
Game Informer	7.25/10
GameRevolution	A−
GameSpot	6.4/10
IGN	6.7/10
Jeuxvideo.com	16/20
Official U.S. PlayStation Magazine	4/5

The game received average reviews according to the review aggregation website GameRankings. In Japan, Famitsu gave it a score of 28 out of 40. GamePro said, "If you're going solo and [you] want to shoot straight pool, Pool Hustler will suit you nicely, but if you're looking for variety, Backstreet Billiards is the tops." (Note: GamePro gave the game two 4.5/5 scores for graphics and control, 3.5/5 for sound, and 4/5 for fun factor.)
