= Another War =

2002 video game

- Developer: Mirage Interactive
- Publisher: Cenega
- Platforms: Microsoft Windows; Mac OS X
- Release: Windows: NA: September 30, 2002; Mac OS X: NA: May 1, 2003
- Genre: role-playing video game
- Mode: Single-player

Another War is a role-playing video game set in World War II. The game was released for Microsoft Windows on September 30, 2002 by Czech publisher Cenega. It was later released for Mac OS X on May 1.

== Plot ==
Another War follows the story of an adventurer involved in his own private war during World War II in Nazi-occupied Europe.

After picking between three character classes (Strongman, Thief, Intelligent) the plot starts off in a small town in Nazi-occupied France called Annecy, where the protagonist and his friend Pierre are captured by the Gestapo in a cafe and imprisoned in a nearby castle. The protagonist then has to find his way out of the imprisonment and try to save his friend.

During his breakout, the protagonist finds a drunken German soldier called Johann who is willing to accompany player throughout his adventure.

After returning to Annecy, the protagonist and Johann meet Renè, a local cafe owner, who knows how to contact the local resistance. After doing a few favors around the town, the character is able to fix the car, get forged papers for Johann and find a map that leads them both to Yugoslavia.

After the car is stopped by a German patrol, Johann discovers he has lost his papers. Just as they are about to be arrested, Yugoslavian partisans arrive and scare the patrol away.

The character and Johann get escorted to a resistance camp where they find out that the camp is being run by a communist commander that hands out vouchers for different combat missions. For the vouchers the partisans get popular plum beverage called slivovitz which is highly sought after. The protagonist agrees to complete several missions, including lighting a signaling fire on a heavily guarded bridge for the allied bombers. The character gets a crate of slivovitz as a prize after returning to the camp.

After that, the character brings the crate of slivovitz to a nearby village called Slavija, where he trades the slivovitz for a drunken partisan called Ivo that they were supposed to find and bring back to the camp. After being carried back to the camp, Ivo sobers up and asks to join the character in its mission to find his friend.

After returning to the small village together, the protagonist gets to complete several small tasks until they accidentally run into a German patrol in northern part of the village. The officer, called Ribbentrop, seems weirdly off and the character finds out that the real Ribbentrop is being held in a basement in the nearby house.

After finding the proof, character returns and is being told by the real Ribbentrop to get rid of the imposter. After accusing the fake Ribbentrop to reveal his true identity, character along with his companions get arrested and are taken to the woods to be executed by a firing squad. A fight breaks out and the group escapes. After returning and talking to the fake Ribbentrop he takes them back to the woods for a fight where he reveals that he is a powerful robot instead. Character along with his friends get wounded and are then taken to a prison camp in Germany.

After finding themselves in a PoW camp, character finds out about a plot to dig a tunnel out of the camp. The protagonist is asked to supply the group some dynamite which the player needs to steal from the camp.

Along with the plotting PoWs, the player meets a woman in the camp called Hupala Prukwa that is a lover of the camp commander. She asks the protagonist for a bottle of whisky and some sexy lingerie which the player agrees to provide. After breaking out of the camp using dynamite and a spoon, the group travels all the way back to France and Yugoslavia to bring back some whiskey and lingerie. Hupala joins the group and together they find out a way to get into the secret factory near PoW camp that is filled with inhumanly powerful Nazi soldiers and other experiments.
