= Q-Ball: Billiards Master =

2000 video game

- Developer: Ornith
- Publishers: JP: ASK; WW: Take-Two Interactive
- Producer: Steve Robert
- Artists: Kurt Miller, Brian Weber
- Composers: Tomoyuki Hikasa, Jun Washida
- Platform: PlayStation 2
- Release: JP: March 30, 2000; NA: October 26, 2000; EU: January 12, 2001
- Genre: Sports
- Modes: Single-player, multiplayer

Q-Ball: Billiards Master, known in Japan as Dōkyū Billiard Master 2 (撞球 ビリヤードマスター2, Dōkyū Biriyādo Masutā 2), and in Europe as Pool Master, is a video game developed by Ornith and published by ASK and Take-Two Interactive for the PlayStation 2 in 2000-2001. It is the sequel to the 1998 video game Pool Hustler, which was released for PlayStation.

The game's working title was Cool Pool Billiards Master, which was originally set to be released on November 26, 2000, one month after the launch of the PlayStation 2. However, Take-Two Interactive launched its new website for the game while changing its name to Q-Ball: Billiards Master, but why the release date was changed back to October 26 is unclear.

== Characters ==
=== Normal Rank ===
- (United States) Ranking Abrahams
  - Cheerful and outgoing; he does not fuss over small details. He is a powerful shooter, but his span of concentration is short. He has a firm grasp of the fundamentals, however, he becomes unstoppable once on fire. If it happens, the player is in trouble. There is nothing they can do except pray that his concentration will be exhausted soon.
- (United States) Natalie Baltimore
  - Young, beautiful, and brilliant. The extremely well calculated shots she delivers explicitly reflect her strategic nature. With an unsurpassed ability to think ahead, she allows no one to take advantage of an unguarded moment. However, she is the least powerful player in the lineup.
- (Vietnam) Ton Vinh Kiem
  - A black sheep in the world of billiards, who pulled himself out of a dissipated, almost-gangster-like life. In those days, he was the king of hustling, bleeding the local young gang members dry. The word "theory" cannot be found in his book, nor can the word "basics". He plays like a shot-gun, blasting through competition with force.
- Ruth Skinny
  - Born to an upper-class family of England, he grew up playing with billiard equipment since his infancy. At the age of 17, his youth does not seem to prevent him from competing squarely against veterans. Unfortunately for him, however, his family was too indulgent with him. Once in a pinch, his mental frailty betrays him. Assail him at that moment. He's not as powerful as he seems.
- (Brazil) Eli Golding
  - She is neither a powerful nor strategic player. However, she turns into a brilliant player at critical moments. Her resilience and outstanding ability to do the impossible are almost supernatural. Her staying power is high despite her fragile appearance.

=== Professional Rank ===
To unlock the Professional Rank opponents, the player must beat any of the Normal Rank opponents and collect four colored portrait pieces on Panel Bingo in VS. Player Game mode. Once he or she found all four portrait pieces, a roulette will decide which billiard game to compete with a Professional Rank opponent. When one game is selected, rules will be set automatically. Then, the player must defeat one of the Professional Rank opponents. If the player wins the games, the Professional Rank opponent will be unlocked. If the player loses, he or she will lose one portrait piece as a penalty, and the roulette will decide which piece will be removed.

==== North America and Europe ====
- (United States) Jethro Madison (Unlock by collecting four magenta portrait pieces in Normal Rank)
  - Starting to play at the age of 17, Jethro became known as the best amateur player in history. Now an all-around Q-Ball Pro with substantial stamina and techniques, he is not easily bent at times of crisis.
- (United States) Nick Jericho (Unlock by collecting four yellow portrait pieces in Normal Rank)
  - Immediately upon joining the Q-Ball Pro Rank at the age of 23, Mr. Jericho won Billiard Master's Professional Championship, giving the public a powerful impression of his coming of age. He continued to win many tournaments in the following decade, earning a nickname "Young Jericho". He later stepped onto the World stage and is highly regarded as a "tough-hearted player." Steady at all times, he does not have any particular weakness and waits patiently for the opponent's mistakes.
- (United States) Heather Huntington (Unlock by collecting four green portrait pieces in Normal Rank)
  - Learning to play at the age of 18, Heather turned pro in 1990. She does not budge even an inch against male opponents. Do not take her lightly by any means, or you are going to be sorry. However, she occasionally makes careless mistakes; make sure to seize those opportunities.
- (England) Andy Siegel (Unlock by collecting four orange portrait pieces in Normal Rank)
  - Turning pro in 1996, Andy gained popularity with his explosive performance. An aggressive player, he is difficult to defeat once he gets on a roll. His ups and downs are rather drastic, however. Be careful not to give him the initiative of the game.
- (United States) Theodore "Buzz" Fletcher (Unlock by collecting four blue portrait pieces in Normal Rank)
  - A year after turning pro at the age of 20, Buzz won the Q-Ball Professional Championship and held the title for four years consecutively. He turned his eyes to the world after playing in American games and started attending tournaments held in various countries. He is an all-around player in all styles of play, but you might have a chance of victory if you succeed in turning the game into a test of endurance.

==== Japan ====
- (Japan) Satoshi Kawabata
- (Japan) Akikumo Toshikawa
- (Japan) Akimi Kajitani
- (Japan) Takeshi Okumura
- (Japan) Kunihiko Takahashi

=== Extra Rank ===
To unlock the Extra Rank opponents, a player must beat all opponents in both Normal and Professional Ranks with all billiard games (8-Ball, US 9-Ball, International 9-Ball, Rotation, and Straight Pool) on Panel Bingo in VS. Player Game mode.

- Jamie (in the yellow outfit)
- Stevie (in the pink outfit)
- Sammy (in the blue outfit)

== Cue Sticks ==
The cue sticks can be unlocked by doing a vertical bingo in VS. Player Mode. The full list of all cue sticks is outlined below:

No.	Cue Type	Shot Power	"English"	Strike Point Area	CPU Opponent
1	Mezz Cues SA-1	Medium	Medium	Medium	—N/a
2	Mezz Cues SA-3	Medium	Medium	Medium	—N/a
3	Mezz Cues SA-6	Medium	Medium	Medium	—N/a
4	Mezz Cues SA-8	Medium	Medium	Medium	—N/a
5	Mezz Cues SA-9	Medium	Medium	Medium	—N/a
6	Mezz Cues SA-10	Medium	Medium	Medium	—N/a
7	Mezz Cues SA-11	Medium	Medium	Medium	—N/a
8	Mezz Cues SA-12	Medium	Medium	Medium	—N/a
9	Mezz Cues Professional UJ-1*	Medium	Medium	Medium	Ranking Abrahams
10	Mezz Cues Professional UJ-2*	Strong	Medium	Medium	Natalie Baltimore
11	Mezz Cues Professional UJ-3*	Medium	Medium	Large	Ton Vinh Kiem
12	Mezz Cues Professional UJ-4*	Strong	Strong	Medium	Ruth Skinny
13	Mezz Cues Professional UJ-5*	Medium	Strong	Large	Eli Golding
14	Mezz Cues Professional UJ-6*	Strong	Medium	Medium	Andy Siegel; Satoshi Kawabata
15	Mezz Cues Professional UJ-7*	Strong	Strong	Medium	Nick Jericho; Akikumo Toshikawa
16	Mezz Cues Professional UJ-8*	Medium	Strong	Large	Heather Huntington; Akimi Kajitani
17	Mezz Cues Professional UJ-9*	Strong	Medium	Medium	Theodore "Buzz" Fletcher; Takeshi Okumura
18	Mezz Cues Professional UJ-10*	Medium	Strong	Large	Jethro Madison; Kunihiko Takahashi
19	Billiards Master Original Cue 1 (Yellow)*	Weak	Weak	Small	Jamie
20	Billiards Master Original Cue 2 (Pink)*	Weak	Very Strong	Very Large	Stevie
21	Billiards Master Original Cue 3 (Blue)*	Very Strong	Weak	Small	Sammy

- * Represents as an unlockable cue stick.

== Music soundtrack ==
The soundtrack for Q-Ball: Billiards Master was composed by Tomoyuki Hikasa and Jun Washida. The music was recorded in early 2000. A player can select a track to listen in the in-game options. The list of tracks was shown below:

1. "A Certain Vibration" (4:44)
2. "At Liberty to Go" (6:22)
3. "Dic Dic Dan" (2:12)
4. "Is This Meaningful Try?!" (5:49)
5. "Morning Fright" (5:03)
6. "Soul of Jazz" (1:34)
7. "Spice" (2:24)
8. "With Modern Sense" (3:08)
9. "Your Chaos" (3:54)

== Reception ==
Reception

Aggregate score
Aggregator	Score
Metacritic	65/100

Review scores
Publication	Score
AllGame	3/5
Electronic Gaming Monthly	6.5/10
EP Daily	6/10
Famitsu	29/40
Game Informer	4.5/10
GameSpot	6.6/10
IGN	5/10
Next Generation	3/5
PlayStation Official Magazine – UK	5/10
Official U.S. PlayStation Magazine	3.5/5

The game received "mixed" reviews according to the review aggregation website Metacritic. Mike Wolf of NextGen said, "We wouldn't label this a must-buy, but it's certainly worth a look." In Japan, Famitsu gave it a score of 29 out of 40.
