= Action Bass =

2000 fishing video game

- Developer: Vingt-et-un Systems Corporation
- Publishers: JP: Syscom; WW: Take-Two Interactive
- Platform: PlayStation
- Release: JP: December 9, 1999; NA: July 27, 2000; EU: September 29, 2000
- Genre: Fishing
- Mode: Single-player

Action Bass (アクションバス, Akushon Basu) is a fishing video game developed by Vingt-et-un Systems Corporation and published by Syscom in 1999 and Take-Two Interactive in 2000 for PlayStation.

== Gameplay ==
Action Bass is a fast‑paced, arcade‑style fishing experience rather than a realistic simulation. Players enter short, three‑minute rounds in Challenge mode, where the goal is to catch as many heavy fish as possible before time runs out. Success unlocks new areas and lures. Outside of timed competitions, Free mode allows leisurely fishing without restrictions, giving players a chance to experiment with different lures that skim the surface or dive deep. These choices directly affect which fish appear. Fish saved in Free mode can be viewed later in an Aquarium. Gameplay tension comes from the fragile fishing line: the line breaks once the caution bar flashes.

== Development ==
The game was developed by Vingt-et-un Systems Corporation, a company founded in November 1992.

== Reception ==
Reception

Aggregate score
Aggregator	Score
Metacritic	51/100

Review scores
Publication	Score
AllGame	3/5
CNET Gamecenter	2/10
Electronic Gaming Monthly	4.5/10
EP Daily	6.5/10
Eurogamer	4/10
Famitsu	22/40
Game Informer	7/10
GameFan	66% (Note: In GameFan's viewpoint of the game, one critic gave it 72, and the other 59.)
GameSpot	5.2/10
IGN	5/10
Official U.S. PlayStation Magazine	2/5

The game received "mixed" reviews according to the review aggregation website Metacritic. In Japan, Famitsu gave it a score of 22 out of 40.
