= Grudge Warriors =

2000 video game

- Developer: Tempest Software
- Publisher: Take-Two Interactive
- Platform: PlayStation
- Release: NA: April 27, 2000; UK: April 28, 2000
- Genres: Action, car combat
- Modes: Single-player, multiplayer

Grudge Warriors is a car combat video game released by Take-Two Interactive on April 27, 2000. The game retailed for the low price of $9.99, a response by Take-Two to the recent decision of Sony to drop PlayStation licensing fees. Similar to the earlier PlayStation title Twisted Metal, players control a powerful tank-like armored vehicle, which they used to destroy enemy vehicles, weapons, and generators, solve puzzles, and collect tokens to upgrade their weapons. There are a total of twenty-three missions, and the game allows two players to battle each other in split screen multiplayer.

Upon its release, Grudge Warriors was received unfavorably; critics bashed the game as having mediocre graphics, poor sounds, and botched gameplay. IGN and Gaming Age declared the game was not even worth the low price of ten dollars. Despite the overwhelmingly critical reception, there were a few points of the game that were praised, including the occasional puzzles during missions.

== Gameplay ==
Screenshot of the Grudge Warriors campaign

Grudge Warriors places the player in control of one of eleven special armored cars. Each one is equipped with five types of weaponry. Four of the weapons are similar on all the cars; the fifth weapon is unique to the vehicle. In single-player, the objective for each mission is to destroy enemy tanks, gun emplacements, vehicles, and generators; there are always eight at each base which must be destroyed. In addition, players can collect tokens as an optional objective; these tokens allow for upgrades and boost the player's score. Some generators can only be reached by solving puzzles; for example, toggling switches which lower otherwise-impenetrable shields surrounding a generator. Every player vehicle features both armor and health; powerups which replenish both can be found scattered throughout the maps. In addition, the player has only a finite amount of ammunition for each weapon. When the player's health is reduced to zero, the game is over and the mission must be restarted.

In addition to the campaign, Grudge Warriors supports two-player splitscreen combat on one of seven multiplayer maps. Unlike the single-player, there are no objectives other than destroying the opponents' vehicle, and no other turrets or enemies besides the other player.

== Plot ==
Grudge Warriors occurs in a future Earth, where nations and governments have been replaced with rival thugs and gangs. These gangs not only stage raids and assaults on their enemies, but also run "Death Rings", where the most powerful gangs have duels between their highly armored vehicles. There are a total of eleven gangs, who each occupy different parts of the world, operating from strongholds.

Players assume the role of an upstart gang member who is attempting to defeat his rivals. Players are allowed to begin the mission by selecting a gang and car; the player then proceeds to play through the campaign using that vehicle. Each mission starts with the player being dropped off at an enemy base, then fighting through defenses to destroy the team's generators. If the player defeats all ten rival gangs, he or she will be invited to fight "the Crime Lord", head of the Death Rings.

== Reception ==
Reception

Aggregate score
Aggregator	Score
GameRankings	48%

Review scores
Publication	Score
AllGame	1/5
Consoles +	65%
Electronic Gaming Monthly	1.5/10
Game Informer	5/10
GameFan	70%
GameSpot	5.1/10
IGN	5.5/10
Official U.S. PlayStation Magazine	2/5

The game received "unfavorable" reviews according to the review aggregation website GameRankings.

IGN noted that Grudge Warriors' "manual reads like a Twisted Metal rip-off. The game controls mirror Twisted Metal. Even the title—Grudge Warriors—is Twisted Metal-ish", yet the publication compared its gameplayer to Blaster Master. The publication praised both the bizarre setup of the game, and the fully playable nature of the game as soon as the disc was inserted; the praised ended there.

IGN strongly criticized the fundamental gameplay, where it took a player thousands of shots to destroy a single enemy, which combined with poor camera control led to constant frustration. GameSpot noted that the single-player mode was essentially deathmatch with some slight semblance of objectives thrown in, and decided the title was "best ignored by fans of meaningful gameplay". The sound was similarly lambasted for being cheap and lackluster. Gaming Age found that though the added complexity and puzzle-solving to find the generators was enjoyable at first, it grew boring after all enemies on the match were dispatched, and the player was left running in circles to find the last generator.

== See also ==
- Re-volt
- Twisted Metal
