= Liath: WorldSpiral =

1998 video game

- Cover of the game
- Platform(s): Windows
- Release: 1998
- Genre(s): Adventure

Liath: WorldSpiral (Russian: Лиат: Спираль мира) is a 1998 Russian adventure video game developed by Amber Company and Exortus, and published by Project Two Interactive for Windows.

== Production ==
The surrealist design of the game took around two years to develop. Oleg Kozhukhov served as the game's director and producer.

== Plot and gameplay ==
The player is a magician named Criss who is looking for a friend named Tiche, who disappeared many years ago in a place called Azeretus.

Gameplay involves talking to characters, solving puzzles, and exploring the environment.

== Critical reception ==
Adventure Gamers was not impressed with the English translation of the game. Just Adventure gave high praise to the title's visual aesthetic. NQuest felt the game didn't have a very distinct plot. Game Over felt the game promised too much and undelivered. Quandaryland thought the game had charm despite its many flaws.
