= Surfing H3O =

2000 video game

Surfing H^{3}O
- Developer: Opus
- Publishers: JP: ASCII Entertainment; WW: Rockstar Games
- Platform: PlayStation 2
- Release: JP: August 10, 2000; NA: October 27, 2000; EU: January 5, 2001
- Genre: Sports
- Modes: Single-player, multiplayer

Surfing H^{3}O, known in Japan as Surfroid: Densetsu no Surfer (サーフロイド 伝説のサーファー, Sāfuroido Densetsu no Sāfā; lit. "Surfroid: The Legendary Surfer"), is a surfing video game developed by Opus and published by ASCII Entertainment in Japan and Rockstar Games internationally for the PlayStation 2.

== Gameplay ==
There are two play modes that can be chosen from the main menu: Tournament which contains a collection of levels with different conditions, and Vs. Mode that is designed as same as the Tournament, only for two players. The latter is not played simultaneously but the players will alternate their turns instead. The goal is to travel through the waves that are moving in a certain direction while picking up the buoys scattered around and doing specific tricks, before the time limit expires. Each course requires the players to collect a certain number of points before progressing to the next one. They can be obtained by collecting markers or performing tricks.

In the Tournament mode, each series consists of six stages. Once a single series is completed, the next competition starts with the same amount of levels and with progressively more difficult conditions. At the beginning, only two difficulty levels are unlocked, easy and intermediate. As each of these are completed, new ones are opening, such as pro or semi pro. The players can choose from eleven different characters, like Kelly Sunset or Mark Mavericks. Each of them have slightly different stats.

== Development ==
Surfing H^{3}O is a reworked version of Surfroid. As a result, the plot that revolved around aliens and the planetary doomsday was cut off from this version.

== Reception ==
Reception

Aggregate score
Aggregator	Score
Metacritic	46/100

Review scores
Publication	Score
AllGame	1.5/5
CNET Gamecenter	5/10
Edge	4/10
Electronic Gaming Monthly	4.5/10
EP Daily	6/10
Famitsu	30/40
Game Informer	3/10
GameRevolution	D−
GameSpot	4.8/10
GameSpy	15%
IGN	4/10
Jeuxvideo.com	8/20
Next Generation	1/5
Official U.S. PlayStation Magazine	2/5

The game received "generally unfavorable reviews" according to the review aggregation website Metacritic. Daniel Erickson of NextGen said that the game was "One cute gimmick away from absolute crap." In Japan, Famitsu gave it a score of 30 out of 40. Four-Eyed Dragon of GamePro said, "Don't expect any Maverick thrills in this disappointing surfer. While it looks like the perfect wave and has an innovative way of controlling your boarder with a miniature surfboard that attaches to both analog sticks, Surfing H^{3}0 [sic] fails to stay afloat with fun gameplay." (Note: GamePro gave the game 4.5/5 for graphics, 3.5/5 for sound, and two 2.5/5 scores for control and fun factor.)
