= Rats! =

1998 video game

- European box art
- Developer(s): Tarantula Studios
- Publisher(s): Take-Two Interactive
- Programmer(s): Martin McKenzie
- Artist(s): Dean Atkin; Robin Taylor
- Composer(s): Anthony Paton
- Platform(s): Game Boy; Game Boy Color
- Release: Game Boy: NA: 1998; EU: 1998; Game Boy Color: NA: 14 December 1998; EU: 1999
- Genre(s): Platform, puzzle, shooter
- Mode(s): Single-player

Rats! is a 1998 2D platform video game developed by Tarantula Studios and published by Take-Two Interactive Software. The game was released in Europe for the Game Boy and Game Boy Color in 1998 under the title Reservoir Rat, and was released in the United States for only the Game Boy Color in 1998 under the title Rats!

== Gameplay ==
Example screenshot of a level within Rats!

Rats! is a 2D platform video game designed for single-player where players play as the character Mr. Rez, described as "a radical yo-yo playing rat-for-hire assassin with an attitude and cool, black shades" who was an "awful assassin".

Rats! uses a password-based save system which allows players to resume their gameplay where they last left off by inputting the correct password for the level.

There are eighty-five levels included within the game. These levels are spread over five environments (themes/worlds) with each environment spanning fifteen levels and two bonus levels and having a time limit. Failure to complete a level within the allotted time will result in black devil enemies appearing.

Each of the environments has its own enemies and unique boss at the end of the level. Each level and boss becomes increasingly harder as the player progresses.

== Release ==
The game was released in France, Germany, and the United Kingdom for Game Boy and Game Boy Color on 30 December 1998 under the title Reservoir Rat.
