= In-Fisherman Bass Hunter 64 =

1999 video game

- European box art
- Developer: GearHead Entertainment
- Publisher: Take-Two Interactive
- Platform: Nintendo 64
- Release: NA: July 30, 1999; EU: October 22, 1999
- Genres: Sports, simulation
- Mode: Single-player

In-Fisherman Bass Hunter 64 (known as Bass Hunter 64 outside North America) is a single-player fishing video game for the Nintendo 64 developed by GearHead Entertainment and published by Take-Two Interactive. It was the first Nintendo 64 fishing game outside Japan, following the region-exclusive Nushi Tsuri 64. It was released in North America on June 30, 1999 and in Europe on October 22, 1999. A Game Boy adaptation of the game, titled In-Fisherman Bass Hunter, was announced to be in development at Tarantula Studios on June 1, 1998, but ultimately stayed unreleased.

== Gameplay ==
A screenshot of In-Fisherman Bass Hunter 64 gameplay

Bass Hunter 64 is mainly a fishing tournament game with an optional "Fish for Fun" mode. The player can only play one portion of the first lake, and can choose whether they will have a male or female character to fish with. They begin with four lures, two line weights, reel, rod, and a boat, the remaining items in the game must be purchased by winning points in the tournament mode. Once each tournament is beaten another area will be unlocked for the player to use in either Tournament or Fun mode. Before a tournament begins the player can choose to shop and use their points to buy new lures, reels, and boats. There are 6 areas that can be unlocked: Lake Arthur in Pennsylvania, Hidden River, Dutch Hollow, Shannon Run, and Butler Chain Lakes in Florida
Lake Palmer, Lake Butler, Lake Chase.

When beginning to fish, the player is given a boat and can drive around in any of the areas that they have unlocked, and then can choose their reel, lure, and even the type of casting they will perform as they send the line out into the water. Once the line goes below the water a split screen view appears showing the area directly surrounding the lure. A depth finder and map are provided telling the depths of the various portions of that area, which can be accessed from the menu, that also has an option of allowing the weather to be changed. Outside of the water can be seen various man made items such as buildings, docks, bridges, while in the water are weeds, lily pads, logs, brush, and tree stumps. Nintendo World, a Future Publishing magazine, described it as "about as much fun as getting a hook in the eye", adding "ultimately it's a one-paced and pretty unimaginative fishin' sim."

This game has three internal memory save slots and supports the Nintendo 64's Rumble Pak which can be used to feel when there is a bite at the line or the player is dragging their line along the bottom, by vibration feedback.

== Game licensees ==
The game has many 3D items that are representations of fully licensed products, such as lures and other such things from such manufactures as Heddon, Rapala, and Ranger Boats. The most notable license of the game is the "In-Fisherman" sponsorship, which contributed its "scientific research and practical experience" to the game.

== Reception ==
Reception

Aggregate score
Aggregator	Score
GameRankings	63%

Review scores
Publication	Score
AllGame	2.5/5
Electronic Gaming Monthly	5/10
Game Informer	7.75/10
GameSpot	4.4/10
IGN	7.6/10
Nintendo Power	7.1/10

The game received "mixed" reviews according to the review aggregation website GameRankings.

== See also ==
- Bass Masters 2000
- Nushi Tsuri 64: Shiokaze Ninotte
