= Montezuma's Return! =

1997 video game

Montezuma's Return
- European Windows cover art
- Developers: Utopia Technologies; Tarantula Studios (GB, GBC)
- Publishers: WizardWorks(PC, US); Take-Two Interactive (GB, GBC, PC EU)
- Designer: Rob Jaeger
- Composers: Aaron Humphries; Dominic Messinger
- Platforms: Windows, Game Boy, Game Boy Color
- Release: Windows: GER: December 1997; NA: October 27, 1998; EU: December 1998; Game Boy: EU: 1998; Game Boy Color: NA: December 1998; EU: 1998
- Genre: Action-adventure
- Mode: Single-player

Montezuma's Return! is a 1997 action/adventure video game and the sequel to the original Parker Brothers game Montezuma's Revenge. While the original game was a 2D platform game, the sequel was a 3D first-person puzzle platformer. According to Steve Bergenholtz, the Utopia Technologies spokesperson, the musical score was written by a TV and film veteran. A port for Nintendo 64 was in the works but was cancelled.

== Plot ==
Max Montezuma is a soldier descended from an ancient Aztec emperor. Max stumbles across a deserted, uncharted island, and accidentally crashes his plane on it. Prior to Max's arrival, the island is undiscovered. Max only has a flashlight, canteen, and an entire lost Aztec civilization before him. He must restore the desecrated tomb of his ancestors, discover the link between the ancient Aztecs and a race of saucer-flying aliens, and more, in his adventure.

== Gameplay ==
The main objective is to guide Max to the ending destination of the level. There are eight levels (nine in newer versions). In every level the player collects treasures and defeats enemies while maneuvering across moving platforms, trampolines, and climbing ropes, or through water, until reaching the boss room. The boss must be defeated to access the level exit. Not every boss can be defeated directly and may require a specific action to affect it (e.g. Using the Lava Lord's own exploding lava rocks against him). If the player has collected 100% treasures, the player can play the bonus level.

Max may be harmed by traps or by enemies. Traps may include deep pits, spikes, or enemies that cannot be harmed (like skulls). Max can attack enemies by punching and kicking, and can kill them by pushing them into water.

There are other collectable items as well as treasures. Max can collect bananas or watermelon chunks to heal damage and key artefacts to unlock barriers.

== History ==
=== Development ===
Montezuma's Return debuted the UVision game engine, which was developed over more than two years. The game engine and tools were programmed in C, from 1995 to 1998, by Atman Binstock, Rich Geldreich, and Rob Jaeger, designer of the original Montezuma's Revenge. The game was developed by eight people. It was showcased at E3 1997.

The game features high-resolution 16-bit colour depth graphics. The object modelling takes into account physics such as gravity, reflection, and wind. The game is true 3D with movement in six degrees of freedom. Optional Fast Phong- and Gouraud shading, perspective mapping, light-sourcing, real-time shadows, bump mapping, z-buffering, MIP mapping combine with multiple movable-point and spotlight light sources, view ports, and cameras to make the graphics an outstanding visual treat. Weather effects and underwater sequences add to the effects.

=== Releases ===
There are versions of the game for Windows, Game Boy, and Game Boy Color, with the Game Boy Color version being the most common. These were developed by Tarantula Studios.

== Reception ==
Reception

Aggregate score
Aggregator	Score	
Aggregator	GBC	PC
GameRankings	69%	69%

Review scores
Publication	Score	
Publication	GBC	PC
AllGame	N/A	3/5
Computer Games Strategy Plus	N/A	3.5/5
Computer Gaming World	N/A	3/5
GamePro	N/A	5/5
GameRevolution	N/A	B
GameSpot	N/A	7.3/10
IGN	7/10	5/10
Next Generation	N/A	2/5
Nintendo Power	6.8/10	N/A
PC Gamer (US)	N/A	78%

The game received average reviews on both platforms according to the review aggregation website GameRankings. GameRevolution gave the PC version a favorable review, over two months before it was released Stateside. Next Generation, however, said that the same PC version "belongs in the 'nostalgia gone wrong' file", with the anonymous reviewer criticizing the game for having the concept of lives.

Utopia Technologies expected to sell 200,000 PC units of the game within four months of its release.
