= Hollywood Pinball =

1999 video game

- Developer: Tarantula Studios
- Publisher: Take-Two Interactive
- Platform: Game Boy Color
- Release: EU: April 1999
- Genre: Pinball
- Mode: Single-player

Hollywood Pinball is a 1999 pinball video game developed by Tarantula Studios, first published by Take-Two Interactive Software in the EU for Game Boy Color in April 1999. Hollywood Pinball was unreleased within the United States.

Hollywood Pinball is a pinball game with several different themed tables taking inspiration from popular movies of the time.

== Gameplay ==
The Shark! table

The game begins with a re-worked rendition of 20th Century Fox's fanfare. The game is played on seven tables each of which is unofficially themed on a Hollywood film. These are Shark (inspired by Jaws), Terror Dactyl, Ancient Temple of the Aztecs (Indiana Jones), Motel Hell (Psycho), Galaxy Wars (Star Wars/Star Trek), Double Agent (James Bond), and The Legend of Robin Hood. The tune on Robin Hood is recognizable, but the others have music similar to, but different from well-known theme tunes.

== Reception ==
Reception

Review scores
Publication	Score
Computer and Video Games	2/5
Planet Game Boy	2/5
Total Game Boy	64%/88%

Total Game Boy rated the game at 64%, with frustration at losing sight of the ill-defined ball. A second reviewer for Total Game Boy gave it 88%, but gave lower scores for individual elements such as sound which it called "functional at best".

Planet Game Boy found it tolerable to play in black & white, but questioned a pinball game using such a small playing window. The game was criticized for being repetitive.

CVG found the tables to be quite basic, and the scrolling to be nauseating.
