= Motocross Mania =

2000 video game

- Developer: Deibus Studios
- Publishers: On Deck Interactive (PC); Take-Two Interactive (PS)
- Platforms: Microsoft Windows, PlayStation
- Release: Microsoft Windows: NA: November 14, 2000; EU: 2000; PlayStation: EU: July 13, 2001; NA: July 17, 2001
- Genre: Racing (Motocross)
- Modes: Single-player, multiplayer

Motocross Mania is a racing game developed by Deibus Studios and published by On Deck Interactive for Microsoft Windows in 2000, and by Take-Two Interactive for PlayStation in 2001.

== Reception ==
Reception

Aggregate score
Aggregator	Score	
Aggregator	PC	PS
Metacritic	73/100	34/100

Review scores
Publication	Score	
Publication	PC	PS
CNET Gamecenter	7/10	N/A
Computer Games Strategy Plus	3/5	N/A
Game Informer	N/A	5/10
GameRevolution	N/A	F
GameSpot	7.7/10	2.1/10
GameSpy	71%	N/A
GameZone	9/10	7/10
IGN	8/10	N/A
Next Generation	N/A	1/5
Official U.S. PlayStation Magazine	N/A	1/5
PC Gamer (UK)	74%	N/A

The PC version received "average" reviews, while the PlayStation version received "unfavorable" reviews, according to the review aggregation website Metacritic. IGN said of the former, "You need guts to go head-to-head with a Microsoft title, and Motocross Mania has more than enough." GameSpot was divided between the two releases. On one hand, Tom Kayes said of the PC version, "If you're a fan of motocross, then Motocross Mania would make a great addition to your collection." However, when it came to the PS version, Jeff Gerstmann scathingly remarked that "With so many better supercross games on the market, many of them older and available at similar bargain-basement price points, Motocross Mania has no place in the market." Scott Steinberg of NextGen called the latter "A stripped-down racer running on fumes – which is exactly what you'd have to be inhaling before purchasing this game."
