= Austin Powers Operation: Trivia =

1999 video game

Austin Powers: Operation Trivia
- Developer: Berkeley Systems
- Publisher: Sierra Attractions
- Director: Martin Streicher
- Producer: Erica Leverett
- Platforms: Microsoft Windows, Macintosh
- Release: US: May 1999; UK: 1999
- Genre: Trivia game
- Modes: Single-player, multiplayer

Austin Powers Operation: Trivia is a 1999 trivia question video game based on the Austin Powers films. It was developed by Berkeley Systems and published by Sierra Attractions for Microsoft Windows and Macintosh. In North America, it was released in May 1999 to coincide with the theatrical debut of Austin Powers: The Spy Who Shagged Me.

== Gameplay ==
Austin Powers Operation: Trivia is a trivia question game based on the Austin Powers films. In the game, Dr. Evil has kidnapped Austin Powers and is holding him at the Electric Psychedelic Pussycat Swingers Club, where he forces Austin to play a trivia game show called Win, Lose or Die. If Dr. Evil wins, he takes over the Earth. Win, Lose or Die is hosted by a robot character, Host Bot, who does not appear in the Austin Powers films. The player chooses to play as either Austin Powers or Dr. Evil, and the game includes a two-player option. The game features over 500 questions, which relate to knowledge of the Austin Powers films, as well as popular culture from the 1960s through the 1990s. The questions are divided across four categories in the following order:

- Need the Info – The player is questioned about historic events and is given multiple answers to choose.
- Stop 'n Go-Go – The player is given four right answers and three false answers, and can only select four of the seven. If one of the four chosen answers is incorrect, the player loses.
- Keep Away – The player must keep answers relating to a certain topic while discarding answers that are irrelevant to the subject.
- Crazy Chain – After the first question, each subsequent question relates to the correct answer of the preceding question.

== Development and release ==
Austin Powers Operation: Trivia was developed by Berkeley Systems and published by Sierra Attractions. The game includes clips of Mike Myers in his dual role as Austin Powers and Dr. Evil. Excluding the clips, the characters are otherwise voiced by Colin Mahan, who also provides the voice of the Host Bot. In the United States, the game was released in late May 1999, coinciding with the theatrical release of Austin Powers: The Spy Who Shagged Me. The game was also released in the United Kingdom that year. It was published as a Microsoft Windows/Macintosh hybrid game. To promote the game, Berkeley Systems launched a sweepstakes in which players could win prizes from various co-sponsors.

== Reception ==
Reception

Aggregate score
| Aggregator | Score |
|---|---|
| GameRankings | 56.50% |

Review scores
| Publication | Score |
|---|---|
| AllGame | 4/5 |
| Computer Gaming World | 2/5 |
| Computer and Video Games | 1/10 |
| GameRevolution | B− |
| GameSpot | 3.8/10 |
| IGN | 8/10 |
| PC Zone | 5.5/10 |
| Entertainment Weekly | B− |
| Inside Mac Games | 8.25/10 |

Michael Marriott, writing for The New York Times, described the game as a "miss," stating that while the game "captures the look and sound" of the films, it "has little to do with the real spirit of Austin Powers and his battles with his chief nemesis, Dr. Evil." Woody Phillips of Macworld stated that the game succeeded as being "groovier than the average pub quiz, but there's no depth – not enough questions and too few rounds." Phillips further stated, "The cheesy graphics and throwback music are mildly amusing – but not for long." Critics believed the game would have particular appeal to Austin Powers fans. Brad Cook of AllGame wrote that the game "is a lot of fun to play, even if you're not a fan of either of the Austin Powers films." Critics stated that the game would be more fun when playing with friends. Some critics considered the Keep Away mode to be confusing, and U.K. publications were disappointed that the game focuses heavily on American trivia, making the questions difficult for non-Americans.

Critics compared the game to the You Don't Know Jack series, also by Berkeley Systems. Mark Hill of PC Zone wrote that while You Don't Know Jack "is consistently funny and throws surprises at you every time you play it, Austin Powers is repetitive and gets irritating rather quickly." Hill was particularly disappointed by Myers' limited involvement in the game. Kim Randell of Computer and Video Games negatively described the game as You Don't Know Jack "with a psychedelic paint job." Agata Budinska of PC PowerPlay stated that there was not much difference between the game and You Don't Know Jack, other than the addition of the Austin Powers theme. Marcel Meyer of The Austin Chronicle believed that fans of You Don't Know Jack would enjoy the game.

Budinska was disappointed that a number of questions seemed unrelated to Austin Powers, writing "don't expect to have your vast and expansive bank of Austin Powers related trivia put to the test." Charles Ardai of Computer Gaming World wrote that many questions "fall flat," while "the ones that actually require knowledge of Austin Powers trivia rather than of general pop-culture arcana will please only hard-core fans of the films." Cook stated that "there are too many questions taken directly from the Austin Powers films, and they're usually the kind that you would only know if you were a big fan of them." Game Revolution also complained about an abundance of questions related to Austin Powers, calling it "shameless self-promotion" of the films. John Broady of GameSpot believed that the questions were generally too difficult, and stated that players would need to be familiar with the films to compete in the game.

Mahan's voiceover work received praise and criticism. Tal Blevins of IGN praised the soundtrack as well as Mahan's voiceovers, writing, "While his Austin Powers is a little bit off, he has Dr. Evil to a tee." Game Revolution praised the voiceover work and considered Mahan to be a good impersonator of Myers. James Turner of GamePro also considered the voiceover work to be authentic. Zack Stern of Inside Mac Games wrote that the voicework "is always good, and at times it is superb." Cook stated that Mahan "does a pretty good job, although there are a few spots where his imitation falls flat." Ardai stated that while the impersonation "isn't bad, it's not quite right, either." Budinska criticized the voiceovers as being very poor, while Broady criticized the "impostor who tries desperately to mimic the intonations of Austin, but who instead comes off like a bad actor in a high school play." Broady also criticized the game's repeated usage of limited catchphrases from Austin Powers and Dr. Evil. Neva Chonin of SFGate.com wrote that many of the game's jokes "get tired fast, as does the sound of Dr. Evil and Austin Powers trading well-worn quips and curses."

For the 1999 Game Critics Awards, Austin Powers Operation: Trivia was nominated in the category of "Best Puzzle/Trivia/Parlor" game, but it lost to Um Jammer Lammy.
