= Austin Powers: Oh, Behave! and Welcome to My Underground Lair! =

2000 action video games

Austin Powers: Oh, Behave! Austin Powers: Welcome to My Underground Lair!
- Box art for Austin Powers: Oh, Behave!
- Developer: Tarantula Studios
- Publisher: Rockstar Games
- Platform: Game Boy Color
- Release: NA: 18 September 2000; EU: 3 November 2000
- Genre: Action
- Modes: Single-player, multiplayer

Austin Powers: Oh, Behave! and Austin Powers: Welcome to My Underground Lair! are minigame-based action games based on the Austin Powers franchise. They were developed by Tarantula Studios, and published by Rockstar Games. Both games were released simultaneously for Game Boy Color, on September 18, 2000, in North America and November 3, 2000, in Europe. The two games are able to connect to one another, with Oh, Behave starring Austin Powers and Welcome to My Underground Lair! starring Dr. Evil.

The games were poorly received by critics.

== Gameplay ==
=== Oh, Behave! ===
Austin Powers: Oh, Behave! is an action game designed for single-player (with some multiplayer functionality) featuring a series of Austin Powers-themed mini-games. International Man in a Platform Game is the largest of the mini-games included within Austin Powers: Oh, Behave!. Within this mini-game, the player plays as Austin Powers in a side-scrolling adventure game inspired by the movie series. The mini-game involves the player climbing obstacles and dispatching foes in an effort to find their way to the end of each level.

Mojo Maze is an Austin Powers-themed Pac-Man mini-game included within Austin Powers: Oh, Behave!. Domination is a board game similar to Othello in which the player flips chips over their opponent's to change the color of the chips. Whoever has the most chips of their color on the board by the end of the game wins. The mini-game Rock, Paper, Scissors included within Austin Powers: Oh, Behave! has the player compete in a timed game of rock paper scissors against a villain from the Austin Powers film series. The player is able to pick the villain that they face as well as the difficulty setting of the game.

=== Welcome to My Underground Lair ===
Mini-games included are Mojo Maze, a Pac-Man-style maze game; Domination, an Austin Powers-themed version of Reversi; and a digitized version of Rock-Paper-Scissors. 'Kin'-Evil, a motorbike racing game whose name is a play on Evel Knievel, is also available. IGN noted that this mini-game is similar to Evel Knievel, another Game Boy Color game developed by Tarantula Studios and published by Rockstar Games. The desktop computer mode features customizable backgrounds, themes, sounds, and screensavers, a movie clip, a calculator, and simulated Internet with information on the Austin Powers films and the actors.

== Development ==
Both versions were developed by Tarantula Studios and published by Rockstar Games for the Game Boy Color, released simultaneously on 28 September 2000 in North America and 3 November 2000 in Europe respectively. Two additional games, Yeah, Baby, Yeah! and Why Make Millions...?, were planned but never released. However, prototypes of both games were later discovered as part of the 2020 Nintendo data leak.

== Reception ==
Reception (Welcome to My Underground Lair!)

Review score
Publication	Score
Hyper	6/10

Both games were met with generally negative reception from critics, including IGN writer Chris Carle who found Oh, Behave! to be bad. Austin Powers: Welcome to My Underground Lair! received mostly poor reviews, holding an average score of 43.75% on GameRankings. IGN's Chris Carle rated the game 3 out of 10, calling it "derivative and boring" and a "shameless abuse of a license". Carle concluded, "Let's put it this way: I'd rather drink what's in the beaker than play this game for an extended period of time." The Tampa Bay Times rated it an F, with the reviewer stating, "I'd take it, but only for $1 million." Robb Guido from Tampa Bay Times gave Oh, Behave! an F stating, "I love Austin Powers as much as anybody, but that's not enough to make me like this non-game. There are a few activities and some funny sound bites, but it takes more than that to be groovy." They also gave Welcome to My Underground Lair! an F for lacking gameplay.

Total Game Boy gave Oh, Behave! a 97% positive review, even featuring the game on the cover of its October 2000 issue, calling it "the most smashing idea since bread was put into a slicer and sold."
