= Jim Henson's Muppets (video game) =

2000 video game

- Cover art
- Developer: Tarantula Studios
- Producer: Take-Two Interactive
- Platform: Game Boy Color
- Release: UK: 31 March 2000; NA: 6 April 2000
- Genre: Platformer
- Mode: Single-player

Jim Henson's Muppets is a 2000 platform game, based on The Muppets franchise, developed by Tarantula Studios and published by Take-Two Interactive for Game Boy Color.

== Gameplay ==
A screenshot of Jim Henson's Muppets.

Jim Henson's Muppets is a platform game in which Dr. Bunsen Honeydew's time machine sends the Muppets back in time. The player is able to play as Kermit and Animal and must travel through different eras time to save the rest of their friends. The game features six zones with a time travel theme, spanning the prehistoric era to the wild west. Each zone features four stages, with a boss level at the end of each zone. Gameplay involves navigating levels to find keys, energy and other bonuses, and using projectiles, such as paper planes and drumsticks, to defeat enemies.

== Reception ==
Reception

Review scores
| Publication | Score |
|---|---|
| AllGame | 3/5 |
| Computer and Video Games | 2/5 |
| Hyper | 5/10 |
| IGN | 2/10 |
| Game Boy Xtreme | 49% |
| Nintendo Pro | 30% |

Muppets received mixed to negative reviews, with many critics focused on the lackluster gameplay and poor connection of the game to the Muppets franchise with few unique features for a platform game.

IGN dismissed the game as a "badly-botched license game" with "wretched" gameplay, stating "the control sucks, the graphics are sloppy, the game's music is [...] not related at all to the Muppets, the action is tedious, the enemies follow patterns and have no intelligence, and aside from the cuts scenes, there's nothing Muppety about this game". Game Boy Xtreme stated Muppets was a "terrible platformer with use of colour and poorer playability". Writing for Hyper, Frank Dry stated the game was a "generic platformer with a few vaguely interesting ideas", with the game "lacking serious entertainment value". Computer and Video Games observed "the action is negative and the characters move along clumsily". Milder reviews included those from Nick Woods of Allgame, who described the game as a "suitable choice for smaller kids", whilst noting "the rest of the gameplay is not unique".
