= Bureau 13 (video game) =

1995 video game

- Developer: Take-Two Interactive
- Publisher: GameTek
- Platforms: MS-DOS, Windows
- Release: 1995
- Genre: Graphic adventure
- Mode: Single-player

Bureau 13 is a graphic adventure game developed by Take-Two Interactive and published by GameTek for MS-DOS compatible operating systems and Microsoft Windows in 1995. It is based on the role-playing game system Bureau 13 and was created by the authors of Hell: A Cyberpunk Thriller. Ports to the Amiga and CD32 were cancelled.

== Reception ==
A reviewer for Next Generation commented that "Although in some ways it's a bit basic compared to its competition, Bureau 13 has enough originality to make it worth a second look." He gave it two out of five stars.

Retrospectively, Richard Cobbett of PC Gamer opined "Bureau 13 is a really dumb game with some clever ideas - one of the kind that doesn't actually work, but really should have," having "the clumsiest interfaces ever inflicted on the world, and one of the dullest worlds."
