= Aqua GT =

2000 video game

- Developer: East Point Software
- Publisher: Take-Two Interactive
- Platforms: Dreamcast, PlayStation
- Release: Dreamcast: EU: December 22, 2000; PlayStation: EU: January 26, 2001
- Genre: Racing
- Modes: Single-player, multiplayer

Aqua GT is an inshore powerboat racing video game developed by East Point Software and published by Take Two Interactive for the Dreamcast in 2000 and PlayStation in 2001. A PC release was previewed in PC Zone but this was not released.

== Gameplay ==
The game sees players racing one of 20 boats through rivers in several major European cities including the Thames and the Seine. Tracks are playable with day and night-time settings, and at high and low tides which alters the difficulty. The game offers three modes: Championship, Arcade and Two-Player (split-screen).

== Reception ==
Steve Boxer of The Daily Telegraph rated the PlayStation release as 4/5, describing it as "surprisingly addictive...mindless but action-packed game", praising the "great courses", "sensible learning curve" and "seriously swift and responsive water-borne machines".

Writing in Official Dreamcast Magazine Philippa Norman gave a score of 3/10, stating that the game was "very repetitive" and had "no replay value", arguing that "crash damage, open-water courses or decent graphics could have been included to improve the game". Alex Warren of Dreamcast Magazine was more positive, pointing to "enough challenge and enjoyment to make it grippingly compulsive and genuinely good fun", but lamenting the unrealistic rendering of water and the movement of the boats upon it.
