= Tang Tang =

2000 video game

- Developers: Excellent Soft Design; GameVision Corporation (GBA)
- Publishers: Excellent Soft Design (Arcade, South Korea); GameVision Corporation (Arcade, North America); Take-Two Interactive (GBA)
- Director: Tony Jeong (arcade)
- Producers: James Park (arcade); Jamie King (GBA); Chris Lacey (GBA)
- Programmer: Jeong Hun Kim (arcade)
- Composer: Manfred Linzner (GBA)
- Platforms: Arcade, Game Boy Advance
- Release: Arcade: KR/NA: May 23, 2000; Game Boy Advance: NA: August 28, 2001; PAL: October 19, 2001
- Genre: Platform
- Mode: Single-player

Tang Tang is a platform game released in arcades in 2000 by the South Korean arcade game developer Excellent Soft Design (ESD). It received a port on the Game Boy Advance which released on August 28, 2001.

== Plot ==
The plot of the game, shown in attract mode, tells that the earth seems to be peaceful forever. But due to the increasing population, there is a big trouble on the earth, making the characters no longer feasible to live on earth. Thankfully, the four characters decided to find out another planet to live on. The four playable characters consists of Cyki, a warm hearted and brave man (Yellow and blue suit). Nana, a broad-minded and cheerful girl (Red and green suit). Niki, a hot-blooded and tough guy (Blue and yellow suit) and Ruru, a shy and timid girl (Green and orange suit).

== Gameplay ==
The game plays similarly to Solomon's Key which is developed by Japanese video game developer Tecmo.

As one of four space soldiers, one or two players place and remove blocks and collect a certain number of crystals to reveal the teleporter which leads to the next level. There are enemies in the game which can be eliminated by shooting fireballs .(the fireball count is labeled 'P'). There are bosses given for each planet, each of which represents a different level, in which players are given unlimited fireballs and unlimited time to eliminate the boss.

Upon completion of a game, players can enter their name in the high score leaderboard. However, there's a glitch where in the arcade version, once all levels are completed, the score cannot be ranked in regardless of how many points the player received throughout the game.

== Reception ==
The GBA version currently has a Metacritic score of 56%, indicating "mixed or average reviews". Frank Provo of GameSpot on the other hand gave it a negative review of 4.8/10, indicating "poor". He commented on the game, calling it "an uninspiring puzzle game with an equally lifeless plot". He said the levels all felt the same and criticized the control scheme.Andrew Blanchard of EAGB Advance gave the Game Boy Advance version a positive review of 4/5 stars, indicating "Good!" He praised the simple controls, colorful graphics, and fast-paced music.
