= Las Vegas Cool Hand =

1998 video game

- North American cover art
- Developer: Tarantula Studios
- Publisher: Take-Two Interactive
- Producer: Steve Marsden
- Designers: Steve Marsden; James Whitfield
- Programmer: James Whitfield
- Artists: Dean Atkin; Robin Taylor
- Composer: Antony Paton
- Platforms: Game Boy Color, Game Boy
- Release: Game Boy Color: NA: December 1, 1998; EU: 1998; Game Boy: EU: 1998
- Genre: Casino
- Modes: Single-player, multiplayer

Las Vegas Cool Hand, known as Cool Hand in Europe, is a casino game developed by Tarantula Studios and published by Take-Two Interactive for the Game Boy Color. It was released on December 1, 1998 in North America and Europe. The game was ported exclusively in Europe on 1998 for the Game Boy.

== Gameplay ==
This video game features blackjack, cribbage, and solitaire. Blackjack can be played by either Las Vegas Strip rules, Downtown Las Vegas rules, London rules, or Atlantic City rules. Cribbage simply requires players to earn 121 points in order to beat the dealer in five different variations of play. Solitaire requires players to remove cards in sequential order while placing them in order on the top of the screen. Other varieties of play for the solitaire round include Elevens, Calculation (also known as Broken Intervals), and Monte Carlo (also known as Weddings and Double and Quits).

The player starts out with a certain amount of pretend money that can be used to practice for the real casino. A complete instruction manual in addition to the online help provided within the cartridges helps first-time players how to play each and every individual game. Players have an option to set the number of decks, the time limit in solitaire games, along with other options that are specific to each game. Statistics are held for each game but are deleted once the console is deactivated.

== Reception ==
Reception

Review score
Publication	Score
IGN	4/10
