= Evel Knievel (video game) =

1999 racing video game

- Developer: Tarantula Studios
- Publishers: NA: Rockstar Games; EU: Take-Two Interactive
- Platform: Game Boy Color
- Release: NA: November 1999
- Genres: action-adventure, racing
- Mode: Single-player

Evel Knievel is an action-adventure racing video game for the Game Boy Color developed by Tarantula Studios.

== Gameplay ==
The game has the player control the titular stuntman Evel Knievel.

== Development ==
Evel Knievel was developed by Tarantula Studios and published in the United States by Rockstar Games and Take-Two Interactive in Europe. Tarantula had also developed the Game Boy Color version of Grand Theft Auto.

== Reception ==
Reception

Review scores
Publication	Score
Computer and Video Games	2/5
GameSpot	6.9/10
IGN	2/10
Total Game Boy	75%

Reviews for Evel Knievel varied from various video game publications.

IGN would label it the worst Game Boy Color game they reviewed. Game Revolution ranked the game as the fifth worst game from Rockstar.
