= Rockstar Lincoln =

British video game developer

Rockstar Lincoln Limited

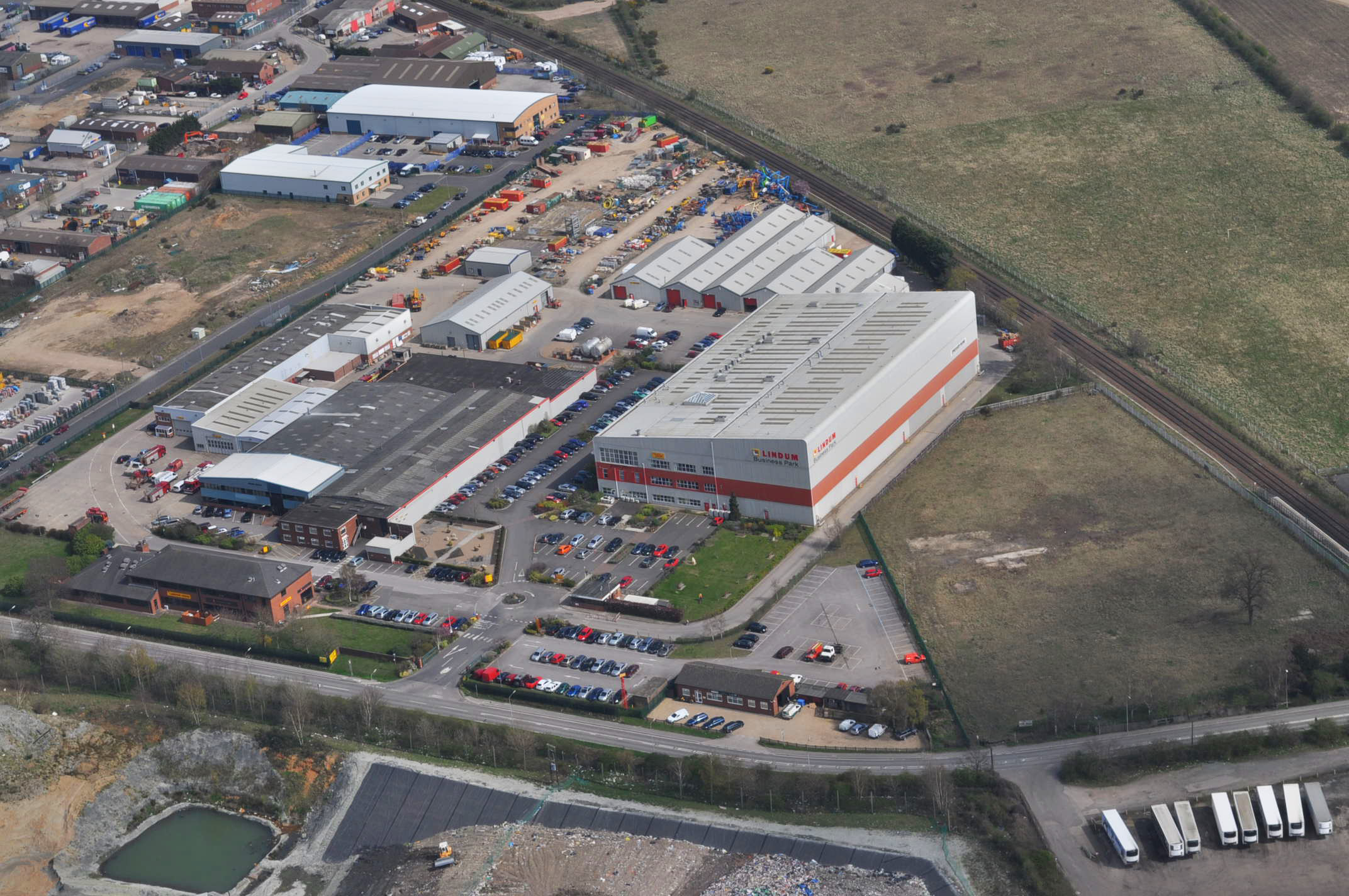
- Headquarters at the Lindum Business Park, North Hykeham (pictured in 2010)
- Formerly: Spidersoft Limited (1992–1998); Tarantula Studios (1998–2002)
- Type: Subsidiary
- Industry: Video games
- Founded: 5 May 1992; 34 years ago in Lincoln, England
- Founders: Steve Marsden; David Cooke
- Headquarters: North Hykeham, England
- Parent: 21st Century Entertainment (1995–1998); Take-Two Interactive (1998–2002); Rockstar Games (2002–present)

Rockstar Lincoln Limited (formerly Spidersoft Limited and Tarantula Studios) is a British video game developer based in North Hykeham. It is the quality assurance and localisation studio of Rockstar Games. Steve Marsden and David Cooke founded the company as Spidersoft in May 1992. It initially developed Game Boy and Game Gear ports of various games, including several pinball video games for the publisher 21st Century Entertainment, which acquired the studio in 1995. Following 21st Century Entertainment's shutdown in 1998, Spidersoft was sold to Take-Two Interactive and renamed Tarantula Studios. The studio continued working on Game Boy and Game Boy Color games, including Grand Theft Auto (1999). In 2002, the development arm of Tarantula Studios was shut down and its quality assurance portion integrated with Take-Two's Rockstar Games label as Rockstar Lincoln.

== History ==
=== Early years and pinball games (1992–1998) ===
Rockstar Lincoln was founded as Spidersoft by Steve Marsden and David Cooke. They had previously worked together in the computer chip manufacturing department of GEC-Marconi from 1982 until 1984, when they turned to game development. They created the ZX Spectrum game Technician Ted, which was published by Andrew Hewson's company Hewson Consultants in 1984. The duo ported the game Speedball 2: Brutal Deluxe to the Game Boy while working with Mirrorsoft in 1991 and created a coin-op conversion of Time Scanner, a pinball video game, for Activision. Hewson shut down Hewson Consultants and co-founded 21st Century Entertainment in 1991. Following a meeting between him and Marsden, Marsden and Cooke established Spidersoft in Lincoln on 5 May 1992. The founders intended to name the company after an insect but found "Bugsoft" inappropriate. As arachnids "spooked them most", they settled on "Spidersoft". Marsden initially intended to keep tropical fish at the office but found that this would have required regularly cleaning their tanks. Instead, and in line with its name, the studio adopted tarantulas, starting with a Goliath birdeater and peaking at 15 specimens. The studio primarily developed ports and adaptations, including of pinball games developed by Digital Illusions and published by 21st Century Entertainment. These include Pinball Dreams, which Spidersoft worked on for six to seven months. The studio also developed a sequel, Pinball Dreams 2, in five months. Outside of pinball projects, Hewson set up the studio with Sony Imagesoft to develop Cliffhanger as a tie-in for the 1993 film. Poker Face Paul's Blackjack and Solitaire were each completed in 25 days.

21st Century Entertainment contracted Spidersoft to port the successful game Pinball Fantasies to a range of platforms, including the Atari Jaguar and Game Boy. Following these ports' 1995 releases, 21st Century Entertainment sought to ensure a steady supply of pinball games without having to rely on third-party contractors, aiming to top the pinball game niche market. To Hewson, Spidersoft appeared willing to continue developing pinball games, whereas Digital Illusions was looking to move away from developing games in the genre. Consequently, 21st Century Entertainment acquired a controlling stake in Spidersoft. As the publisher increasingly focused on pinball games, Hewson lost his passion for the business, which he felt had become "formulaic". In 1997, he was offered a position at a start-up founded by old contacts of his, so he agreed with his co-investors to part ways and wind down the company. 21st Century Entertainment was defunct by March 1998.

=== Acquisition and handheld games (1998–2000) ===
On 1 June 1998, Take-Two Interactive announced its acquisition of Spidersoft, renaming it Tarantula Studios. The studio shifted its focus to game development for the Game Boy and Game Boy Color, starting with Montezuma's Return!, In-Fisherman Bass Hunter, and an unannounced project for the former platform, as well as Three Lions and Space Station Silicon Valley for the latter. Marsden remained with Tarantula Studios as the studio director. In October 1999, the studio employed 24 development staff and was in the process of hiring 15 quality assurance workers. It also held five tarantulas at this time, residing in Marsden's office. Tarantula Studios developed multiple games concurrently, each with a team of two programmers and two artists. Later games by Tarantula Studios include Rats! (1998) and Jim Henson's Muppets (1999), as well as Evel Knievel (1999), Grand Theft Auto (1999), Grand Theft Auto 2 (2000), Austin Powers: Welcome to My Underground Lair! (2000), and Austin Powers: Oh, Behave! (2000), which were published by Take-Two's Rockstar Games label. Evel Knievel became the lowest-scored Game Boy Color game on IGN at 2.0/10, with the site's writers describing it as "ruthlessly hard and impossible to play".

=== Transition to quality assurance (2001–present) ===
By 2001, the development and quality assurance departments of Tarantula Studios had been separated, of which the former was shut down in 2002. The remainder was integrated with Rockstar Games as Rockstar Lincoln in the same year. As part of Rockstar Games, the studio provides quality assurance and localisations—including French, German, Italian, Japanese, Russian, and Spanish—for internal projects, such as Manhunt, Max Payne 2, and the Grand Theft Auto series. In January 2011, Mark Lloyd, Rockstar Lincoln's long-time studio head who had been with the company since 1999, announced his resignation. His departure coincided with that of Mark Washbrook, the founder and studio head of Rockstar London. Rockstar Games stated that neither departure would affect the studios' active projects. Tim Bates succeeded Lloyd as general manager. Lloyd went on to found a video game consultancy service, Titanium Consultancy, which he later voluntarily wound down. Alongside Washbrook, he joined Activision's mobile-focused Activision Leeds studio in May 2012.

Around 2016, Rockstar Lincoln moved into the Lindum Business Park in North Hykeham. A survey it conducted with its employees led East Midlands Trains to provide several additional stops at Hykeham railway station, within walking distance of the office, from May 2016. Rockstar Lincoln won the "Active Workplace" award in the Lincolnshire Sports Awards in 2015 and 2016, and it was nominated again in 2017. The studio offered its employees subsidised gym memberships, and a "Sports & Social" team organised sporting and leisure activities.

Leading up to the release of Red Dead Redemption 2 in October 2018, it was reported that Rockstar Lincoln staff had, of all Rockstar Games studios, experienced the worst crunch. Former and active employees reported that testers were paid low wages, had to work long hours, and were subjected to strict security regulations. One employee stated that mandatory overtime for work on Red Dead Redemption 2 started in August 2017, prior to Rockstar Games entering "official crunch mode" that October. Testers at Rockstar Lincoln were asked to work evenings and weekends. They would initially work three nights per week, and later five. Of those working overtime, localisers and lead testers were paid annual salaries and thus were not compensated for working additional hours. In contrast, regular testers were paid by the hour and, depending on how long they worked, earned more than their leads. In response to reports of overtime, the studio's management announced in a meeting held on 19 October 2018 that overtime at the studio would immediately become optional. All testers at the studio were to be converted to full-time employees by 1 August 2019. Security measures were relaxed to allow mobile phones at the workplace, and a flexitime system was introduced.

== Games developed ==
=== As Spidersoft ===
List of games developed by Rockstar Lincoln, 1992–1996
Year	Title	Platform(s)	Publisher(s)	Notes
1992	Hook	Game Gear	Sony Imagesoft	Port development
1993	Poker Face Paul's Blackjack	Game Gear	Adrenalin Entertainment	
1993	Pinball Dreams	Game Boy, Game Gear, MS-DOS, Super Nintendo Entertainment System	21st Century Entertainment, GameTek	Port development
1993	Chuck Rock	Game Boy	Sony Electronic Publishing	Port development
1993	Cliffhanger	Amiga, Game Boy, Game Gear, Nintendo Entertainment System	Sony Imagesoft, Psygnosis	
1994	Lemmings 2: The Tribes	Game Boy	Psygnosis	Port development
1994	Andre Agassi Tennis	Game Gear	Lance Investments	Port development
1994	Pinball Arcade	MS-DOS	21st Century Entertainment	
1994	Poker Face Paul's Solitaire	Game Gear	Sega	
1994	Pinball Dreams 2	MS-DOS	21st Century Entertainment	
1994	Math Blaster Episode I: In Search of Spot	Sega Genesis, Super Nintendo Entertainment System	Davidson & Associates	Port development
1995	Pinball Fantasies	Atari Jaguar, Game Boy, PlayStation, Super Nintendo Entertainment System	21st Century Entertainment, GameTek	Port development
1995	Pinball World	MS-DOS	21st Century Entertainment, Rebellion Developments	
1995	Thomas the Tank Engine and Friends Pinball	Amiga, Amiga CD32, MS-DOS	Alternative Software	
1995	Pinball Mania	Amiga, Game Boy, MS-DOS	21st Century Entertainment, GameTek	
1996	Pinball Builder	Windows	21st Century Entertainment	
1996	Total Pinball 3D	MS-DOS	21st Century Entertainment	

=== As Tarantula Studios ===
List of games developed by Rockstar Lincoln, 1996–2001
Year	Title	Platform(s)	Publisher(s)	Notes
1998	Las Vegas Cool Hand	Game Boy, Game Boy Color	Take-Two Interactive	
1998	Montezuma's Return!	Game Boy, Game Boy Color	Take-Two Interactive	
1998	Rats!	Game Boy, Game Boy Color	Take-Two Interactive	
1999	Hollywood Pinball	Game Boy Color	Take-Two Interactive	
1999	Space Station Silicon Valley	Game Boy Color	Take-Two Interactive	
1999	Three Lions	Game Boy Color	Take-Two Interactive	
1999	Jim Henson's Muppets	Game Boy Color	Take-Two Interactive	
1999	Evel Knievel	Game Boy Color	Rockstar Games	
1999	Grand Theft Auto	Game Boy Color	Rockstar Games	
2000	Austin Powers: Oh, Behave!	Game Boy Color	Rockstar Games	
2000	Austin Powers: Welcome to My Underground Lair!	Game Boy Color	Rockstar Games	
2000	Grand Theft Auto 2	Game Boy Color	Rockstar Games	
2000	Formula One 2000	Game Boy Color	Take-Two Interactive	
2001	Kiss Pinball	PlayStation	Take-Two Interactive	Port development
2001	Hidden & Dangerous	PlayStation	Take-Two Interactive	Port development

=== Cancelled ===
- In-Fisherman Bass Hunter
