= Bill Raymond =

American actor (born 1938)

- Born: William Joseph Raymond; September 9, 1938 (age 87); San Francisco, California, U.S.
- Occupation: Actor
- Years active: 1960s–present

William Joseph Raymond (born September 9, 1938) is an American actor who has appeared in film, television, theater and radio drama since the 1960s.

== Career ==
He is featured in the second and fifth seasons of the HBO drama The Wire as "The Greek", the mysterious head of an international criminal organization. Other TV appearances include Miami Vice, Law & Order, Third Watch, Ed and As the World Turns.

Raymond co-starred as Dr. Carroll on The Cobblestone Corridor, which premiered on October 16, 2016, on Connecticut Public Television.

In 2015, Raymond played Grand Albert in the kids TV show, Super Wings.

=== Film ===
His film credits include Eight Men Out, Michael Clayton, C.H.U.D., The Crow, Quick Change, How I Got into College, My New Gun, 12 Monkeys, and Dogville.

Raymond played Speaker of the United States House of Representatives Schuyler Colfax in Steven Spielberg's Lincoln. In 2014, he played the lead role in the ghost film Foreclosure, opposite Michael Imperioli. He appeared in seven of Vermont filmmaker, Jay Craven's indie films, including Where the Rivers Flow North, A Stranger in the Kingdom, In Jest, The Year That Trembled, Windy Acres, Disappearances, and Peter and John.

=== Theater ===
Raymond was an active member and co-artistic director of the experimental theater group Mabou Mines in the 1970s and 1980s.

He played Ebenezer Scrooge in the Hartford Stage production of Charles Dickens' A Christmas Carol for 17 of its first 19 years, retiring from the role in 2016.

Raymond was also active in the early days of the R.G. Davis Mime Troupe in San Francisco in the 1960s.

=== Radio ===
Raymond has played the character T.J. Teru, archeologist on Summa Nulla, in all 13 chapters of the ZBS Foundation's audio series, Ruby the Galactic Gumshoe, produced from 1982 to 2018. Raymond has appeared in other ZBS productions as well, including Saratoga Springs, Saratoga Fat Cats, Do That in Real Life? and the audio adaptation of Dinotopia.

== Filmography ==
=== Film ===
Year	Title	Role	Notes
1977	Sudden Death	Businessman	Uncredited
1980	Christmas Evil	Priest	
1981	Strong Medicine	Young man	
1983	Baby It's You	Mr. Ripeppi	
1984	C.H.U.D.	Victor	
1988	Eight Men Out	Ben Short	
1988	Me and Him	Humphrey	
1989	How I Got into College	Flutter	
1989	Forced March	Gyorgy	
1990	Quick Change	Policeman	
1991	City of Hope	Les	
1991	True Identity	Grunfeld	
1991	Liebestraum	Matt	
1992	My New Gun	Andrew	
1993	Where the Rivers Flow North	Wayne Quinn	
1994	The Crow	Mickey	
1994	The Ref	George	
1995	12 Monkeys	Microbiologist	
1997	Ties to Rachel	Henry	
1997	One Night Stand	Gridlock Taxi Driver	
1998	Harvest	Roger Barnes	
1999	Simply Irresistible	Howard	
1999	Summer of Sam	Father Cadilli	
1999	The Hurricane	Paterson Judge	
1999	Spring Forward	Don Regan	
1999	A Stranger in the Kingdom	Resolved Kinneson	
2000	The Intern	Deep Throat	
2000	Autumn in New York	Michael	
2001	Wish You Were Dead	Dr. Norm Rollins	
2002	The Year That Trembled	Ernie Whirly	
2003	What Alice Found	Bill	
2003	Dogville	Mr. Henson	
2004	A Hole in One	Dr. Harold Ashton	
2006	Disappearances	Compton	
2007	Michael Clayton	Gabe Zabel	
2007	The Junior Defenders	Bill Samuels	
2008	Eavesdrop	Hal	
2012	Lincoln	Schuyler Colfax	
2014	Foreclosure	Raymond	
2014	Rob the Mob	Priest	
2015	Peter and John	Beausire	
2015	Five Nights in Maine	George	
2015	The Dark Side	Man Waiting For Coffee	
2021	Blood Brothers: Civil War	Captain Beausire	

=== Television ===
Year	Title	Role	Notes
1986, 1987	Miami Vice	Dave Frobel / Tommy Barkley	2 episodes
1988	Clinton and Nadine	Jewell	Television film
1991	Golden Years	Dr. Richard X. Toddhunter	7 episodes
1992–2000	Law & Order	Various roles	3 episode
1993-95	All My Children	Bill Hart	Recurring role
1993	TriBeCa	Lawyer	Episode: "Heros Exoletus"
1994, 1995	Halifax f.p.	Caretaker	2 episodes
1995	Kingfish: A Story of Huey P. Long	Oscar K. Allen	Television film
1996	If Looks Could Kill	Florida Realtor	Television film
1998	Saint Maybe	B.B. Brandt	Television film
1999	Now and Again	Reverend Miller	Episode: "A Girl's Life'
2000	Cupid & Cate	Father Francis	Television film
2000, 2003	Ed	George Wilkes	2 episodes
2002	Law & Order: Criminal Intent	Mr. Green	Episode: "Faith"
2002	A Death in the Family	Father Jackson	Television film
2003	Third Watch	Jerry	Episode: "The Spirit"
2003–2008	The Wire	The Greek	10 episodes
2004	Windy Acres	Ug	7 episodes
2005	As the World Turns	Judge	4 episodes
2010	Damages	Albert Wiggins	4 episodes
2011	Duckworth	Eli Duckworth	Episode: "Pilot"
2016	The Cobblestone Corridor	Dr. Carroll	5 episodes
2017	Super Wings	Grand Albert	3 episodes
2018	Bull	Judge Jessup	Episode: "Bad Medicine"
2019	Mrs. Fletcher	Roy Rafferty	5 episodes
