= John Rothman =

American actor (born 1949)

- Rothman in 2026
- Born: John Mahr Rothman; June 3, 1949 (age 77); Baltimore, Maryland, U.S.
- Education: Wesleyan University (BA); Yale University (MFA)
- Years active: 1980–present
- Spouse: Susan Bolotin (m. 1983)
- Children: 2
- Family: Thomas Rothman (brother); Jessica Harper (sister-in-law); Glenn Shadix (second cousin)

John Mahr Rothman (born June 3, 1949) is an American film, television, and stage actor.

== Life and career ==
Rothman was born to a Jewish family in Baltimore, Maryland, the son of Elizabeth D. (née Davidson) and Donald N. Rothman, a lawyer. He is older brother of film executive Thomas Rothman.

A graduate of Wesleyan University and the Yale School of Drama, his Broadway stage credits include Richard Nelson's Some Americans Abroad and the 2007 revival of Craig Lucas's Prelude to a Kiss. He performed in numerous Off-Broadway productions including his own one-person play The Impossible H. L. Mencken.

Rothman portrayed Union General John F. Reynolds in Gettysburg (1993). He has appeared on such shows as Guiding Light, Blue Bloods, Law & Order, and Arrested Development.

Rothman also appeared in such comedic movies as Ghostbusters (1984), Big (1988), Jingle All the Way (1996), Say It Isn't So (2001), Welcome to Mooseport (2004), Taxi (2004), and Ghostbusters: Frozen Empire (2024), and portrayed real-life September 11 terror victim Edward Felt in the 2006 film United 93.

== Filmography ==
=== Film ===
Year	Title	Role	Notes
1980	Stardust Memories	Jack Abel	
1982	Sophie's Choice	Librarian	
1983	Zelig	Paul Deghuee	
1984	Ghostbusters	Roger Delacorte, Library Administrator	
1985	The Purple Rose of Cairo	Mr. Hirsch's Lawyer	
1986	Heartburn	Jonathan Rice	
1987	Three O'Clock High	Mr. Medved	
1987	Hello Again	Bearded Man	
1988	Big	Phil	
1988	The Boost	Ned	
1989	See You in the Morning	Veterinarian	
1989	Bloodhounds of Broadway	Marvin Clay	
1991	The Boy Who Cried Bitch	Stokes	
1992	Mamma ci penso io	U.S. Consul	
1993	The Pickle	Chauffeur	
1993	Where the Rivers Flow North	The Lawyer	
1993	The Saint of Fort Washington	Irate Driver	Uncredited
1993	Mr. Wonderful	Ralph	
1993	Gettysburg	Maj. Gen. John F. Reynolds	
1995	Copycat	Andy	
1996	The Associate	Jogging Track Executive	
1996	Jingle All the Way	Mall Toy Store Manager	
1996	Childhood's End	Bernard Chute	
1997	Picture Perfect	Jim Davenport	
1997	A Further Gesture	FBI Agent No. 2	
1997	The Devil's Advocate	District Attorney Broygo	
1998	The Siege	Congressman Marshall	
1999	Two Ninas	Barry Litzer	
1999	24 Nights	Paul	
2000	Dinner Rush	Gary Lieberman	
2000	Pollock	Harold Rosenberg	
2001	Say It Isn't So	Larry Falwell	
2001	Plan B	Dr. Pete	
2001	Kate & Leopold	Executive #1	
2002	Unfaithful	Jerry	Uncredited
2002	The First $20 Million Is Always the Hardest	Ben	
2003	Daredevil	Quesada Attorney	
2003	Easy	Lawrence Harris	
2004	Welcome to Mooseport	Stu	
2004	Knots	Dave's Lawyer	
2004	The Door in the Floor	Minty O'Hare	
2004	I Heart Huckabees	Corporate Board #2	
2004	Taxi	Business Man	
2005	Brooklyn Lobster	Sal Guardino	
2005	Prime	Jack Bloomberg	
2005	The Ringer	Priest	
2006	United 93	Edward P. Felt	
2006	The Devil Wears Prada	Editor	
2006	The Hoax	Puffy Man	
2007	Dark Matter	Rene	
2007	Arranged	Matan Meshenberg	
2007	Day Zero	Rifkin's Father	
2007	Reservation Road	Minister	
2007	Enchanted	Carl	
2008	The Accidental Husband	Business Man	
2008	Synecdoche, New York	Dentist	
2008	The Understudy	Unknown	
2008	The Day the Earth Stood Still	Dr. Myron	
2009	Adam	Beranbaum	
2009	According to Greta	Edgar	
2011	Choose	Elliot Vincent	
2012	Abraham Lincoln: Vampire Hunter	Jefferson Davis	
2012	Hitchcock	Accountant	Uncredited
2013	Northern Borders	Judge Allen	
2014	That Awkward Moment	Chelsea's Father	
2014	Affluenza	Rabbi Cohen	
2015	Peter and John	Attorney Bennett	
2015	Stealing Chanel	Charles Borden	
2015	Her Composition	Dean	
2016	Good Kids	Mr. Evans	
2016	My Art	John	
2017	Fits and Starts	Publisher	
2018	Hot Air	Kent	
2019	The Report	Sheldon Whitehouse	
2019	Bombshell	Martin Hyman	
2020	Nocturne	Roger	
2021	Small Engine Repair	Mr. Walker	Uncredited
2022	Call Jane	Director McDonald	
2023	Maybe I Do	Neighbor Next Door	
2024	Ghostbusters: Frozen Empire	Roger Delacorte, Library Administrator	
2024	Lost Nation	Governor George Clinton	
2026	The Accompanist	Oscar	

=== Television ===
Year	Title	Role	Notes
1981	Ryan's Hope	Ralph Pugh	
1982	Nurse	Dr. Mitchell	
1984	How to Be a Perfect Person in Just Three Days	Contest Judge	TV movie
1985–1987	Tales from the Darkside	Young Man / Jim	
1986	Saturday Night Live	Priest	
1987	Spenser: For Hire	Stanley Michaels	
1990–2010	Law & Order	Expert Witness / Steven Strelzik / O'Hara / Internist	
1991	Separate but Equal	Jack Greenberg	
1991	Golden Years	Dr. Ackerman	
1993	Class of '96	Arthur Cohen #2	
1993	NYPD Blue	Gerald Zimmer	
1994	Birdland	Dr. Alan Bergman	
1994	The Adventures of Pete & Pete	Mr. Lerdner	
1997	Screen One	Aurora Exec. Officer	
1998	Dellaventura	Dr. Tim Spivak	
1998	From the Earth to the Moon	Warren Moburg	
1998	Witness to the Mob	White House Advisor	TV movie
1998	Rear Window	Franklin Porter	TV movie
1999	Trinity	Clayton	
1999	Third Watch	Ross Green	
2000	Mary and Rhoda	Estate Lawyer	TV movie
2000	Deadline	Joshua Roth	
2001	100 Centre Street	Dr. Diamond	
2004	Arrested Development	Charles Milford	
2005	Judging Amy	Christopher Coddington	
2006	Conviction	Martin Bernip	
2006	Rescue Me	Bud	
2007–2009	Guiding Light	Judge Joe Green	
2009	Damages	Earl Jacoby	
2009	Kings	Minister of Finance	
2009	Law & Order: Criminal Intent	Peter Evans	
2010	Bored to Death	Dean Saunders	
2011	Onion News Network	Ronald Noth	
2011	Private Practice	Lawrence Freedman	
2011	Chaos	Byron Duke	
2011	The Whole Truth	Proctor	
2012	White Collar	Graham Slater	
2012	Game Change	A. B. Culvahouse	TV movie
2012	Blue Bloods	Walter Harris	
2014	Elementary	Elias Openshaw	
2014	The Mysteries of Laura	Pastor Bob	
2014–2019	Law & Order: Special Victims Unit	Judge Edward Kofax	
2015–2017	One Mississippi	Bill	
2016	Deadbeat	Saul	
2017	Suits	Walter Samson	
2019	Bull	Blake Powers	
2022	The Blacklist	Wallace Avery	
2023	Painkiller	Mortimer Sackler	
2023	Julia	Alfred Knopf	
