= Lost Nation =

Lost Nation may refer to:

- Lost Nation, Iowa, city in Clinton County, Iowa, United States
- Lost Nation, Illinois, unincorporated community and census-designated place in Ogle County, Illinois, United States
- Lost Nation (film), American drama film by Jay Craven (2024)
