= Jay Craven =

American film director

Jay Craven is an American film director, screenwriter and former professor of film studies at Marlboro College. He is based in Vermont.

Craven is known for creating films on modest budgets, adopting many of the novels of author Howard Frank Mosher to film. He often casts from a regular troupe of Vermont actors including Tantoo Cardinal and Rusty DeWees, but has also worked with Rip Torn and Kris Kristofferson. Craven founded and runs Kingdom County Productions and recently launched Catamount Arts performing arts program, New England's largest independent arts producer and presenter. He is married to Bess O'Brien, who is also a co-founder of Kingdom County Productions.

Craven attended Boston University for undergraduate studies, where he developed a lifelong friendship with Howard Zinn. He later went on to Goddard College. He lives in the Northeast Kingdom with his family.

== Filmography ==
- Where the Rivers Flow North (1994)
- A Stranger in the Kingdom (1998)
- In Jest (1999)
- The Year That Trembled (2002)
- Disappearances (2006)
- Northern Borders (2013)
- Peter and John (2015)
- Wetware (2018)
- Lost Nation (2024)
