= Rusty DeWees =

American actor

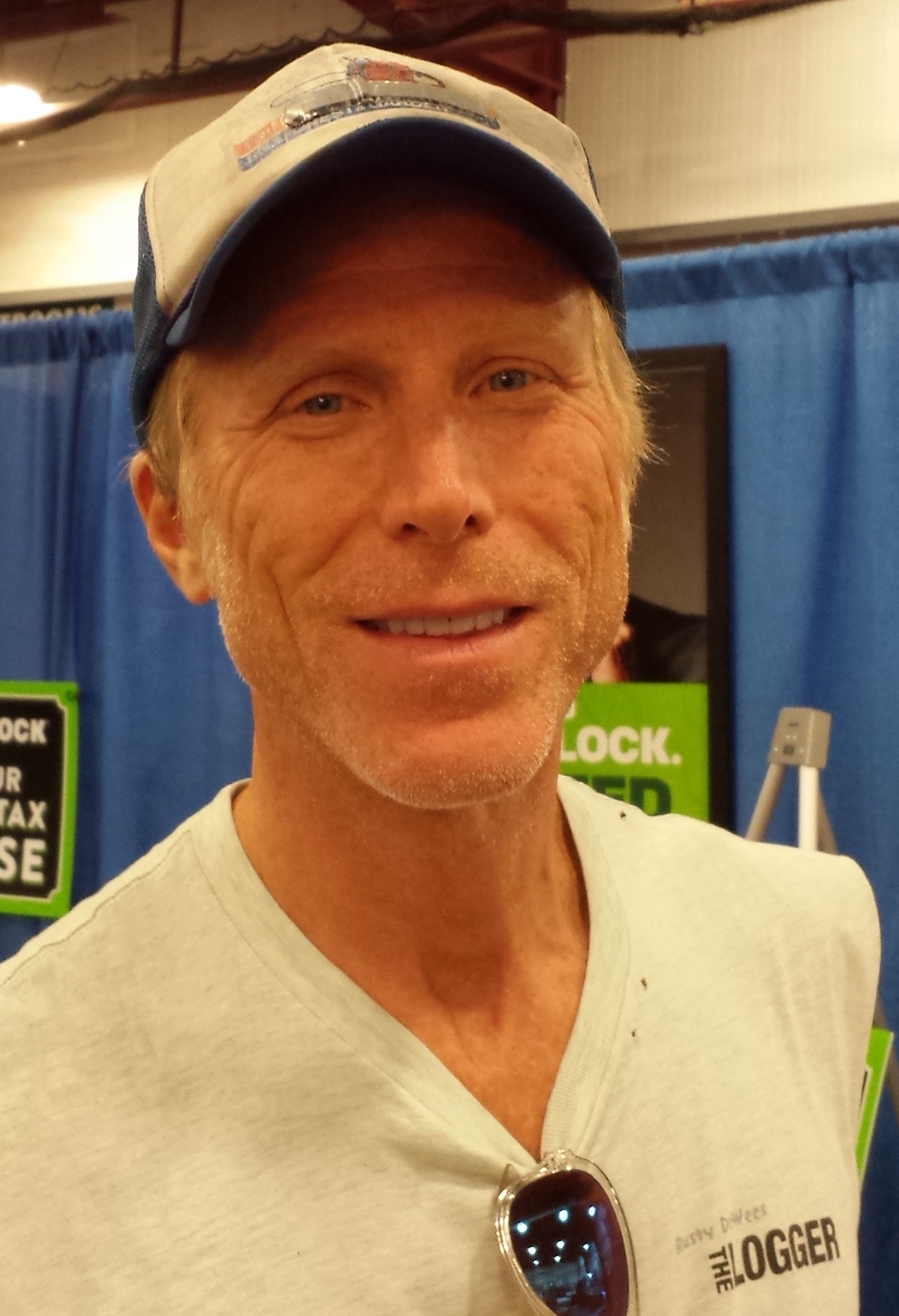
- Rusty DeWees in 2016
- Born: 15 November 1960 (age 65); Philadelphia, Pennsylvania
- Occupations: actor, producer and writer

Rusty DeWees (born November 15, 1960) is an American actor, producer and writer. He works regionally in Vermont, Off-Broadway, in television, and films. He is best known for his one-man comedy show, The Logger.

== Early life ==
Rusty DeWees was born in Philadelphia, Pennsylvania, the son of Marilyn Mason DeWees, a homemaker and newspaper business manager, and William Wallace DeWees, a Greyhound bus driver. He is the younger brother of Holly DeWees. DeWees is Dutch, meaning "the orphan". He attended Stowe High School, where he played basketball, and percussion in the school band. He also performed in high school theater productions. After graduating high school DeWees, worked as a school bus driver, basketball coach, stonemason, and logger. During a town team basketball game, Champlain College coach Robert Tipson noticed him and recruited him to play basketball on the team. After graduating, he worked as a gas jockey in Burlington, Vermont.

== Career ==
DeWees acted in Burlington with Vermont Repertory Theater under the direction of Robert R. Ringer before moving to New York City in 1989 to pursue an acting career.

In New York, DeWees worked as an assistant to William J. Doyle of William Doyle Galleries, while doing commercials and movies on the side.

Known for his authentic rural appearance, DeWees appeared in the films: Black Dog, A Stranger in the Kingdom, Pieces of April, Radical Jack, Mud Season, Where the Rivers Flow North, and The Devil's Own. DeWees also appeared in Law and Order, The Cosby Mysteries, and various soap operas.

While working on the Patrick Swayze movie, Black Dog, he met the singer Meat Loaf, who gave DeWees advice on how to produce his one-man play, The Logger, a comedy in Two Ax, for which he is best known in and around New England.

DeWees has also written two books, Scrawlins, and Scrawlins Too compilations of short essays.

He was also the host of several episodes of the series Little Hardhats, a program explaining how different machines work.

== Filmography ==
=== Film ===
Year	Title	Role	Notes
1993	Ethan Frome	Man At Post Office	
1993	Where the Rivers Flow North	The Champ	
1996	Diamond Run	Reece	
1997	Pressure Point	Local	
1998	Black Dog	Junior	
1998	My Mother's Early Lovers	Tom / Strage and Beautiful Soldier	
1999	Mud Season	Jerry	
1999	A Stranger in the Kingdom	Harlan Kittredge	
2000	Icebreaker	Timmy	
2000	The Newcomers	Dennis Brownbear	
2001	New Port South	Janitor	
2001	Ordinary Sinner	Bill Parish	
2002	The Year That Trembled	Local Cop	
2003	Pieces of April	Joy's Biker Guy	
2004	Mending Wall	"Red"	
2004	Senses of Place	Ethan Reed	
2004	Nothing Like Dreaming	"Red" Morisette	
2006	Disappearances	"Frog" LaMundy	
2008	Shout It Out	Jessie's Dad	
2010	The Sparrow and The Tigress	Jake	
2013	Northern Borders	"Bumper" Stevens	
2013	Before I Sleep	Nurse	

=== Television ===
Year	Title	Role	Notes
1991	Little Hardhats	Host	TV program; ended 1997
1994	The Cosby Mysteries	Bailiff	Season 1 Episode 8: Expert Witness
1995	Law & Order	Leon Trapp	Season 6 Episode 5: Hot Pursuit
1997	Law & Order	Dave Randall	Season 7 Episode 11: Menace
2004	Windy Acres	Lucian LaFlamme	Main Role; 7 Episodes
