= Leo & Liz in Beverly Hills =

- Created by: Steve Martin; Carl Gottlieb; Paul Perlove; Pamela Pettler
- Starring: Harvey Korman; Valerie Perrine; Sue Ball; Deborah Harmon; Michael J. Pollard; Kenneth Kimmins
- Theme music composer: David Frank
- Opening theme: "Mr. Sandman"
- Country of origin: United States
- Original language: English
- No. of seasons: 1
- No. of episodes: 6

Production
- Executive producer: Steve Martin
- Running time: 30 minutes
- Production companies: 40 Share Productions; Universal Television

Original release
- Network: CBS
- Release: April 25 – June 6, 1986

Leo & Liz in Beverly Hills is an American sitcom starring Harvey Korman, Valerie Perrine and Sue Ball broadcast from April 25 to June 6, 1986 on Friday nights at 8:30 p.m ET on CBS.

== Summary ==
Leo and Liz Green were nouveau riche social climbers who had just moved to Beverly Hills from New Jersey and were desperate to fit in with their new surroundings, which they found to be quite intimidating. They had numerous problems including zany servants, odd neighbors, and pretentious in-laws, as their daughter Mitzi (Sue Ball) had married into a family of old money.

The pilot for this program had been aired the fall before as part of George Burns Comedy Week. However, the program failed to deliver an audience as a mid-season replacement and was canceled after only six regular weekly episodes were aired.

== Cast ==
- Harvey Korman as Leo Green
- Valerie Perrine as Liz Green
- Deborah Harmon as Diane Fedderson
- Kenneth Kimmins as Jerry Fedderson
- Sue Ball as Mitzi Green
- Julie Payne as Lucille Trumbley
- Michael J. Pollard as Leonard

== Episodes ==
No.	Title	Directed by	Written by	Original release date
1	"The 'A' List"	Steve Martin	Story by : Steve Martin; Teleplay by : Pamela Pettler	April 25, 1986
2	"Perfect Days, Sleepless Nights"	Nell Cox	Stephen Schneck	May 2, 1986
3	"In the Beginning"	Nell Cox	David Axelrod	May 9, 1986
4	"Unaccustomed as I Am to Public Speaking"	Nell Cox	David Cohen & Roger S.H. Schulman	May 16, 1986
5	"Chapter Eleven"	Unknown	Paul Perlove & Carl Gottlieb	May 30, 1986
6	"Remodeling"	Unknown	David Axlerod	June 6, 1986

== Bibliography ==
- Tim Brooks and Earle Marsh, The Complete Directory to Prime Time Network and Cable TV Shows 1946–Present, Ninth edition (New York: Ballantine Books, 2007) ISBN 978-0-345-49773-4
