= The Dark Wind (1991 film) =

- Theatrical release poster
- Directed by: Errol Morris
- Screenplay by: Eric Bergren; Neal Jimenez
- Based on: The Dark Wind by Tony Hillerman
- Produced by: Patrick Markey
- Starring: Lou Diamond Phillips; Fred Ward; John Karlen; Gary Farmer
- Cinematography: Stefan Czapsky
- Edited by: Freeman Davies; Susan Crutcher
- Music by: Michel Colombier
- Production companies: Carolco Pictures; Le Studio Canal+
- Distributed by: Seven Arts (through New Line Cinema)
- Release date: November 1991; (BFI London Film Festival)
- Running time: 111 minutes
- Country: United States
- Languages: English; Navajo; Hopi

The Dark Wind is a 1991 American mystery drama film based on The Dark Wind by Tony Hillerman, one of a series of mysteries set against contemporary Navajo life in the Southwest. Directed by documentary filmmaker Errol Morris in his fiction debut, it stars Lou Diamond Phillips as Jim Chee and Fred Ward as Joe Leaphorn.

Robert Redford acted as executive producer, hoping for a series of films, but was ultimately unhappy with the result, which he called "a false start", "miscast" and "ill-conceived", and it was not distributed. However, Redford would persist in his efforts to adapt Hillerman's books, acting as executive producer on the film Skinwalkers in 2002, and on the television series Dark Winds (2022–present), which would be his final work.

== Synopsis ==
As Officer Jim Chee (Lou Diamond Phillips) watches a windmill, trying to catch the vandal repeatedly sabotaging it, a small plane crashes nearby. Thus begins a tangled story involving not only the vandalism and the crash, but also murder, drug smuggling, and burglary. Officer Chee is suspected by the FBI when drugs known to have been on the plane are missing.

== Cast ==
- Lou Diamond Phillips as Officer Jim Chee
- Fred Ward as Lt. Joe Leaphorn
- John Karlen as Jake West
- Gary Farmer as Deputy Cowboy Albert Dashee
- Michelle Thrush as Shirley Topaha
- Guy Boyd as Agent Johnson
- Blake Clark as Ben Gaines
- Gary Basaraba as Larry

== Reception ==
Director Errol Morris did not finish the film due to "artistic differences" with Redford.
