= Sean Nelson (actor) =

American actor (born 1980)

- Nelson at the 2025 Sundance Film Festival
- Born: May 9, 1980 (age 46); The Bronx, New York, U.S.
- Occupation: Actor

External image
- Sean Nelson IMDb photo

Sean Nelson (born May 9, 1980) is an American actor. Nelson began his career as a child actor, receiving notice after his film debut in Fresh (1994), as the eponymous title character.

Major roles in American Buffalo (1996) and The Wood (1999) followed, in addition to Nelson playing the recurring role of Jesse Bayliss on drama Sisters (1995−96). Nelson has continued acting in adulthood, predominantly in independent films and small roles on television.

Nelson has won an Independent Spirit Award and received a Sundance Film Festival Award, both for his role in Fresh.

== Early life ==
Nelson was born in the Co-op City section of the Bronx, New York, in a working class family. He is the son of Aubrey, a mechanical engineer, and Sonia Nelson.

In 1988, he enrolled at a local acting school. Nelson's mother had originally wanted her son to learn the piano and take voice lessons, but the instructor decided Nelson should study acting instead. As a teenager, Nelson attended the Professional Performing Arts School. Nelson studied film at Temple University and he graduated by 2007.

== Career ==
By the age of 10, he landed a role in the off-Broadway play Hey Little Walter. He made his TV debut in a 1992 episode of the NBC series Here and Now starring Malcolm-Jamal Warner. Nelson appeared on stage as Steve in a 1994 production of The Shadow Box.

Nelson made his film debut in Fresh (1994), appearing as the lead character Michael (who goes by Fresh), a young boy who works for two drug dealers. The film's director, Boaz Yakin, had originally dismissed Nelson after his first audition, but a casting director convinced Yakin to give Nelson another audition, and Nelson won the part.

His performance in the film was met with positive reception, with reviewers describing Nelson as "vibrant," "superb," and "the key to the movie's success." He earned a Sundance Film Festival Award in addition to the Independent Spirit Award for Best Breakthrough Performance. Nelson was the inaugural honoree for the latter. He also received a Young Artist Award nomination for his work on Fresh.

Throughout the 1990s, he appeared in guest roles on crime dramas Law & Order, Homicide: Life on the Street, and New York Undercover. Nelson played the role of Bobby in American Buffalo (1996), starring opposite Dennis Franz and Dustin Hoffman. A movie critic of The Deseret News stated Nelson was able to "hold his own" alongside the more experienced actors. Nelson would later reprise his role of Bobby in a theater production of American Buffalo (2005).

He portrayed young Mike in The Wood (1999), with one reviewer opining Nelson was the strongest of the three young actors in the film. Stephen Holden of The New York Times believed Nelson provided poignancy to the film. Nelson performed as DeAndre McCullough, the son of divorced drug addicts, in the HBO miniseries The Corner (2000). Tom Shales, a reviewer for The Washington Post, claimed Nelson was "magnetic" in the role of DeAndre.

Nelson appeared in the 2004 short film Date as James, and portrayed Willie in Stake Land (2010). Nelson was Charlie, a teenager newly released from juvenile hall, in the 2005 miniseries Miracle's Boys. Some of his film work as an adult includes The Gospel (2005) and Premium (2006). Nelson has guest starred on television series Elementary (2014), The Good Wife (2015), and Blue Bloods (2022).

== Filmography ==
- Fresh (1994), as Michael "Fresh"
- New York Undercover (1995) (TV) as Al
- American Buffalo (1996), as Bobby
- A Stranger in the Kingdom (1998), as Nathan Andrews
- The Wood (1999), as Young Mike
- The Year That Trembled (2002), as Phil Robbins
- Date (2004), as James
- The Gospel (2005), as Young Frank
- Their Eyes Were Watching God (2005) (TV), as Hezekiah
- The Orphan King (2005), as Damon
- Miracles Boys (2005), as Charlie
- Premium (2006), as Austin Price
- The Mannsfield 12 (2007), as Lil Rich
- The Taking of Pelham 123 (2009), as ESU One
- Stake Land (2010), as Willie
- The Breaking Point (2014), as Jay

== Television ==
- Law & Order, as Damon Fox (1 episode, 1994), Steven "Four Strike" Foreman (1 episode, 2005), and Lt. Van Buren's son (2 episodes, 2009)
- Homicide: Life on the Street, as Ronnie Sayers (1 episode, 1995)
- New York Undercover, as Alex (2 episodes, 1994–1995)
- Sisters (1991), as Jesse Bailiss (8 episodes, 1995–1996)
- The Client, as Justin Mayfield (1 episode, 1996)
- Touched by an Angel, as Calvin (2 episodes, 1997)
- The Corner (2000 miniseries), as DeAndre McCullough
- Law & Order: Special Victims Unit, as Tito Frank (1 episode, 2001)
- Law & Order: Criminal Intent, as Taye Powers (1 episode, 2003)
- The Jury, as McKinley Jones (1 episode, 2004)
- Miracle's Boys (2005 miniseries), as Charlie
- Tales as Stokley Overton ( S3. Ep.1, 2022)
- Power Book II: Ghost as Kai (3 episodes, 2023)
