= George Woodard =

American actor

- Born: June 18, 1952 (age 74); Waterbury Center, Vermont
- Occupations: Actor, director, dairy farmer
- Children: 1
- Parents: Theresa Woodard; George Woodard Sr.
- Relatives: Steve (younger brother); Bernard (elder brother); Joanna (sister)

George Woodard Jr. (born June 18, 1952 in Waterbury, Vermont) is an actor, musician, and dairy farmer.

== Early life ==
George Woodard Jr. was born on June 18, 1952 in Waterbury Center, Vermont, to George and Theresa Woodard, both of whose parents were also farmers. He had two brothers, Steve and Bernard Woodard, and a sister, Joanna Woodard. He created various short films, documenting the life of a farmer in Vermont. After watching the film The Miracle of Paradise Valley, Woodard took an interest in becoming an actor. This interest stemmed from him watching stage productions at the Hyde Park Opera House, which further persuaded him to take up acting as a career.

He experimented with acting in high school, taking part in high school and local summer stock plays and musicals, while rebuilding the family dairy business. Later he moved to Hollywood for three years to explore acting. In Hollywood, Woodard starred in a few low-budget films. The need for someone to lead the operation of the Woodard family farm brought him home to Vermont, where he ran the family's dairy business.

He appeared in the films Time Chasers, Ethan Frome, My Mother's Early Lovers, The Mudge Boy, America's Heart and Soul, along with a few TV commercials. He also appeared as the host in several episodes of the children's educational television series Little Hardhats.

In 2010, Woodard wrote the screenplay, directed, edited and acted in The Summer of Walter Hacks, a coming of age story set in rural New England of the 1950s and features Henry, his son.

In 2023, he released his second feature film The Farm Boy, a story set in the 1940s during World War II about a boy growing up and working as a milkman on the family farm. The story is based on Woodard's parents growing up on a farm. The story features Henry Woodward, George's son, playing the role of Calvin Dillard, a Vermont farmer sent to Europe during World War II.

George Woodard Jr.'s mother died in 2004. His brother, Steve, died in 2011.
