= Deborah Harmon =

American film and television actress (born 1951)

- Born: May 8, 1951 (age 75); Chicago, Illinois, United States
- Education: The Second City
- Occupation: Actress
- Years active: 1976–2009
- Spouses: Edward Leonetti (m. 1975; div. 1977) Bill Blackwell (m. 1980; div. 1989)
- Children: 1

Deborah Harmon (born May 8, 1951) is an American film and television actress.

Harmon was born in Chicago, Illinois. She attended The Second City troupe in Chicago, until moving to Los Angeles to pursue an acting career. She is probably best remembered for her role as Elizabeth Lubbock in the ABC television series Just the Ten of Us, which was a spin-off of Growing Pains, where she first appeared in the role for two episodes in 1988. She also was a regular on the short-lived television series The Ted Knight Show and Leo & Liz in Beverly Hills. She has also had parts in films such as Bachelor Party (1984) and Back to the Future (1985), and co-starred with Kurt Russell in the 1980 comedy Used Cars.

Despite her surname, Harmon is not related to popular actor Mark Harmon, nor to his family, the Harmon–Nelson family (a well-known California show-business family).

== Filmography ==
- Laverne & Shirley as Receptionist (1 episode, 1976)
- The Ghost of Flight 401 (1978) (TV) .... Mary Smith
- The Ted Knight Show (1978) TV series .... Joy (1978)
- The Paper Chase as Jeannie (1 episode, 1978)
- Space Force (1978) .... Ship's Crier
- Quincy, M.E. as Judy (1 episode, 1979)
- The T.V. Show (1979) (TV) .... various characters
- Used Cars (1980) .... Barbara Jane Fuchs
- Tales of the Unexpected as Daisy Flock (1 episode, 1981)
- Comedy of Terrors (1981) (TV) .... Molly Sutherland
- M*A*S*H as Nurse Webster (2 episodes, 1982)
- The Facts of Life as Gail Gallagher (1 episode, 1983)
- Bachelor Party (1984) .... Ilene
- My Wicked, Wicked Ways: The Legend of Errol Flynn (1985) (TV) .... Prudence
- Night Court as Sue Harper, Public Defender (1 episode, 1985)
- Back to the Future (1985) (uncredited) .... TV Newscaster
- George Burns Comedy Week (1 episode, 1985)
- The Twilight Zone as Hostess (segment 'But Can She Type?') (1 episode, 1985)
- Prince of Bel Air (1986) (TV) .... Carol Kampion
- Leo & Liz in Beverly Hills (1986) TV series .... Diane Fedderson
- All Is Forgiven as Sharon Russell (1 episode, 1986)
- When the Bough Breaks (1986) (TV) .... Lisa
- Baby Girl Scott (1987) (TV) .... Terri
- CBS Summer Playhouse as Shirley (1 episode, 1987)
- St. Elsewhere as Sally (1 episode, 1987)
- Sledge Hammer! as Angelica Delmonte (1 episode, 1987)
- Tales from the Darkside as Katie Weiderman (1 episode, 1987)
- Growing Pains as Elizabeth Lubbock (2 episodes, 1988)
- Just the Ten of Us as Elizabeth Lubbock (47 episodes, 1988–1990)
- Dear John as Wendy Lacey (2 episodes, 1990–1991)
- True Facts (1992) (TV)
- Sisters as Judy Burns (1 episode, 1994)
- Mr. Payback: An Interactive Movie (1995) .... Medical Center Woman
- The Mommies as Susan (1 episode, 1995)
- Boy Meets World as Connie (1 episode, 1995)
- Married... with Children as Mimi Stokes / ... (2 episodes, 1987–1996)
- Clueless as Rebecca Morgan (2 episodes, 1997)
- Son of the Beach as Pussy Willow (1 episode, 2002)
- Malcolm in the Middle as Parent Volunteer (1 episode, 2002)
- Imps* (2009) .... Mom (segment "3-Mile Island People")
