= Little Hardhats =

- Genre: Educational children's television series
- Created by: Fred Levine
- Directed by: Fred Levine
- Starring: George Woodard; Rusty Dewees
- Composer: Various
- Country of origin: United States
- Original language: English
- No. of episodes: 10

Original release
- Release: 1991 – 2007

Little Hardhats is an American educational children's television series. The show talks about how different machines do different jobs. Actors George Woodard and Rusty Dewees explain to the viewers how the different machines work and how they get the job done.

== List of episodes ==
The episodes are as follows:

Title	Release year
Road Construction Ahead	1991
Fire & Rescue	1993
Cleared for Takeoff	1994
Where the Garbage Goes	1996
House Construction Ahead	1997
Farm Country Ahead	1998
Road Construction Ahead 2	2007
Big Boats & Busy Harbors	2007
The Biggest Machines in the World	2011
All Aboard	2013

== Reception ==
The show received positive reviews from critics and parents alike. Harry Smith of CBS News said, "...once your kids see this, they're mesmerized".

== Collections ==
Big Machines Vol. 1 - features Road Construction Ahead, Farm Country Ahead, and House Construction Ahead

Big Machines Vol. 2 - features Fire & Rescue, Where the Garbage Goes, and Cleared for Takeoff

Big Machines Vol. 2 - features Road Construction Ahead 2. Big Boats & Busy Harbors, The Biggest Machines in the World, and All Aboard

DVD with all 10 episodes

== Awards and recognition ==
- Best Videos for Preschoolers ages 2 to 5 category - Coalition for Quality Children's Media (for "Where the Garbage Goes"); featured in A Parent's Guide to the Best Children's Videos: DVD's and CD-ROM's handbook (2001; ISBN 978-1-931199-04-9)
- Best Children's Video of the Year - Coalition for Quality Children's Media 2001 (for "Farm Country Ahead")
- Top 10 Best Films for Toddlers and Preschoolers - Parents Magazine Nov 1999 issue (for "Road Construction Ahead")
- Endorsement from Coalition for Quality Children's Media - Kids First (for "House Construction Ahead"); featured in A Parent's Guide to the Best Children's Videos: DVD's and CD-ROM's handbook (2001; ISBN 978-1-931199-04-9)
- People Magazine, June 1994 (for "Road Construction Ahead"); article titled, "Road to Riches, on Fred's success with blockbuster movie, Road Construction Ahead"
- Good Morning America with Joan Lunden ABC Feb 1994, guest appearance about Fred's success creating a new genre of big-machine movies for toddlers & preschoolers.
- Best Videos for Preschoolers ages 2 to 5 category - Coalition for Quality Children's Media 2001 (for "Fire & Rescue"); featured in A Parent's Guide to the Best Children's Videos: DVD's and CD-ROM's handbook (2001; ISBN 978-1-931199-04-9)
- CBS prime-time feature, "Eye to Eye with Connie Chung and Harry Smith" CBS News, Oct 1993
- California Children's Media Awards 1992 Winner (for "Road Construction Ahead")
