= Gary Farmer =

First Nations actor and musician (born 1953)

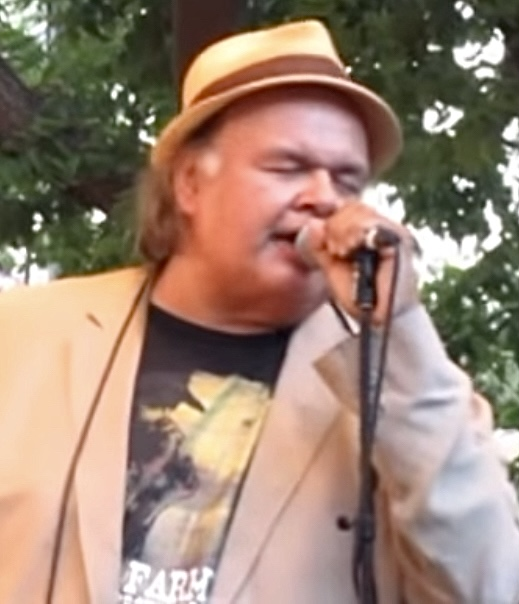
- Farmer performing with Gary Farmer and the Troublemakers in 2012
- Born: Gary Dale Farmer; June 12, 1953 (age 73); Ohsweken, Ontario, Canada
- Education: Syracuse University; Ryerson University
- Occupations: Actor, musician
- Years active: 1976–present
- Relatives: Graham Greene (second cousin once removed)

Gary Dale Farmer (born June 12, 1953) is a Canadian First Nations (Cayuga) actor and musician. He is best known for his Independent Spirit Award-nominated roles in Powwow Highway (1989), Dead Man (1995) and Smoke Signals (1998). He briefly reprised his role as Nobody from Dead Man in Ghost Dog: The Way of the Samurai (1999).

He is the founding director of an urban Indian radio network, Aboriginal Voices Radio Network.

== Early life and education ==
Farmer was born in Ohsweken, Ontario into the Cayuga Nation and Wolf Clan of the Haudenosaunee/Iroquois Confederacy. He grew up in the American city of Buffalo where his father worked as a crane operator. His second cousin once removed is fellow actor Graham Greene. Farmer attended Syracuse University and Ryerson Polytechnic University, where he studied photography and film production.

== Career ==
=== Acting ===
Farmer's first acting role was in the 1976 play On The Rim of a Curse, about the Beothuk. His first major television role was on the CBC's Spirit Bay. He subsequently played police captain Joe Stonetree on the syndicated TV series Forever Knight, and Chief Tom in the CBC first nations TV series The Rez. Farmer is best known for his role as spiritual Native American guide Nobody in Dead Man. Farmer reprised the role for a cameo in Ghost Dog: The Way of the Samurai, also directed by Jim Jarmusch.

Farmer has performed in both the film and television adaptations of Tony Hillerman's novels. He played "Cowboy" Albert Dashee (Hopi) in the 1991 film The Dark Wind, and Captain Largo (Navajo) in the television adaptations of Coyote Waits (2003) and A Thief of Time (2004).

He played a supporting character Burt in the 2001 crime thriller The Score starring Robert De Niro, Marlon Brando, Ed Norton, Angela Bassett and Paul Soles. Farmer appeared in two episodes of the popular children's television show Big Comfy Couch as Wobbly.

Farmer played the role of Fagin in Twist, the 2003 independent adaptation of the Charles Dickens classic novel Oliver Twist, and the role of "Iktome" in the 2003 all Native American cast TV film Dreamkeeper, directed by Steve Barron. He played Deputy Bob in Demon Knight. Other major roles included Henry Colville, with Kris Kristofferson, in Disappearances (2006) and Jack in Jimmy P: Psychotherapy of a Plains Indian (2013) by Arnaud Desplechin.

He recorded the audiobook version of Louise Erdrich's 2012 novel The Round House, winner of the 2012 National Book Award for Fiction.

Farmer appeared in season 1 of the Sundance TV series The Red Road in 2014.

In 2020, Farmer had brief appearances in the films First Cow and The Dark Divide.

Farmer appeared as the recurring character Uncle Brownie in the highly-acclaimed FX series Reservation Dogs from 2021-2023, and as Dan Twelvetrees in the Syfy series Resident Alien.

He was nominated for Independent Spirit Awards for his roles in the movies Powwow Highway, Dead Man, and Smoke Signals

=== Music ===
He has a blues band called Gary Farmer and the Troublemakers. The band has released two CDs, Love Songs and Other Issues in 2007 and Lovesick Blues in 2009.

=== Other ===
Farmer is a regular supporter of University of Nebraska Omaha Wambli Sapa Memorial Pow Wow, held a week before the Gathering of Nations Powwow. He makes appearances selling his CDs and occasionally giving speeches. The University of Nebraska-Omaha (UNO) considers Farmer a "very good friend". Farmer received an honorary degree from Fort Lewis College in 2022.

== Filmography ==
=== Film ===
Year	Title	Role	Notes
1984	Police Academy	Sidewalk Store Owner	
1984	Overdrawn at the Memory Bank	Tooby	
1987	The Believers	Mover	
1987	The Big Town	Duke	
1988	Blue City Slammers	Doug	
1988	Powwow Highway	Philbert Bono	
1989	Renegades	George	
1990	Still Life: The Fine Art of Murder	Billy	
1991	The Dark Wind	Cowboy Albert Dashee	
1992	Forever Knight	Captain Joe Stonetree	
1993	Ed and His Dead Mother	Big Lar	
1994	Sioux City	Russell White	
1995	Demon Knight	Deputy Bob Martel	
1995	Dead Man	Nobody	
1996	Henry & Verlin	Henry	
1996	Lilies	Timothée	
1998	Smoke Signals	Arnold Joseph	
1998	Stolen Heart	Whitaker	
1999	Ghost Dog: The Way of the Samurai	Nobody	
1999	Touched	George	
1999	Heater	Ben	
2001	Delivering Milo	Max	
2001	The Score	Burt	
2001	Route 666	Shaman	
2002	Skins	Verdell Weasel Tail	
2002	Angels Don't Sleep Here	Lou Washington	
2002	Adaptation	Buster Baxley	
2003	The Big Empty	Indian Bob	
2003	Twist	Fagin	
2003	The Republic of Love	Ted	
2004	Evergreen	Jim	
2004	Sawtooth	Seven Thumbs	
2005	3 Needles	Winker at Support Group	
2006	Disappearances	Herny Coville	
2006	One Night with You	Momo	
2007	All Hat	Billy Caan	
2007	Intervention	Bob	
2008	Swing Vote	Curly	
2009	Rejection	Albert	
2009	The Timekeeper	Cook	
2010	Good Neighbours	Roland Brandt	
2010	Ink: A Tale of Captivity	Alderman	
2010	A Windigo Tale	Harold	
2011	A Bird of the Air	Charles Ballard	
2011	California Indian	Rich Knight	
2011	Foreverland	Moe	
2012	Path of Souls	Eddie Benton Benai	
2013	Jimmy P: Psychotherapy of a Plains Indian	Jack	
2013	Winter in the Blood	Lame Bull	
2015	Peter and John	Smoke	
2019	The Incredible 25th Year of Mitzi Bearclaw	Oliver Yellowdog	
2019	First Cow	Totillicum	
2019	Blood Quantum	Moon	
2019	Santa Fake	Santa Claus	
2020	Cowboys	Robert Spottedbird	
2020	The Dark Divide	Densmore	
2021	Blood Brothers: Civil War	Smoke	
2021	Run Woman Run	Self	
2022	Quantum Cowboys	Calvin	
2023	Hey, Viktor!	Gary	
2026	How We Stand		

=== Television ===
Year	Title	Role	Notes
1983	American Playhouse	Tooby	Episode: "Overdrawn at the Memory Bank"
1985	The Undergrads	Castro	Television film
1986	Philip Marlowe, Private Eye	Masters' Bodyguard	Episode: "Spanish Blood"
1986	Doing Life	First Prisoner	Television film
1986	Unnatural Causes	—N/a	Television film
1986	Christmas Eve	Jody	Television film
1988	Miami Vice	Wilson	Episode: "Bad Timing"
1988	9B	Harry Derek	Episode: "Dropout"
1989	Friday the 13th: The Series	Rick	Episode: "Wedding Bell Blues"
1990	Sparks: The Price of Passion	Pete	Television film
1990	China Beach	Dreamwalker	Episode: "Strange Brew"
1991	Plymouth	Todd	Television film
1992	E.N.G.	Detective Brant	2 episodes
1992–1994	Forever Knight	Capt. Joe Stonetree / Detective Norton	23 episodes
1993	Street Legal	Allan Michaels	Episode: "Conduct Unbecoming"
1993	Blown Away	Anderson	Television film
1993	The Big Comfy Couch	Wobbly	2 episodes
1994	The Adventures of Dudley the Dragon	Tiny / Big Giant	Episode: "Dudley Meets a Tiny Giant"
1996	Moonshine Highway	Hooch Wilson	Television film
1997	Promised Land	Conrad Shorty	Episode: "The Outrage"
1997	Ghostwriter	Jake Rizzo	Episode: "Past Tense"
1998	The Pretender	Vincent LaPahie	Episode: "Hope & Prey"
1999	Justice	Lou Belcourt	Television film
2000	The Virginian	Buster	Television film
2001	The West Wing	Jack Lone Feather	Episode: "The Indians in the Lobby"
2001	Dice	Ernie Ross	6 episodes
2002	The Job	Injun Joe	Episode: "Soup"
2002	Screech Owls	Thomas	Episode: "Sacred Ground"
2002	Skinwalkers	Captain Largo	2 episodes
2003	Lord Have Mercy!	Marty C. Martyn	2 episodes
2003	Odd Job Jack	George Twotrees	Episode: "Go West Young Ryder"
2003	Dreamkeeper	Iktome	Television film
2003	Mutant X	Dr. Marcus	Episode: "The Taking of Crows"
2003	A Thief of Time	Captain Largo	Television film
2003	Coyote Waits	Captain Largo	Television film
2004	The Chris Isaak Show	Larry	Episode: "The Family of Man"
2006	One Dead Indian	Judas George	Television film
2006	Doomstown	Detective Jeff Norstrom	Television film
2006	Indian Summer: The Oka Crisis	Alan Montour	Television film
2007	Moose TV	Gerry Keeshig	8 episodes
2007	Elijah	Ray	Television film
2008	The Border	Reserve Police Chief	Episode: "Gray Zone"
2008–2009	Easy Money	Shep	7 episodes
2012	Blackstone	Ray Delaronde	8 episodes
2013, 2017	Longmire	Aaron Two Rivers	2 episodes
2014–2015	The Red Road	Mac	6 episodes
2015–2016	Zoo	Anik	2 episodes
2017	Guilt Free Zone	Milo	4 episodes
2019	Blackwater	Charles Goodman	Episode: "Pilot"
2021–2025	Resident Alien	Dan Twelvetrees	31 episodes
2021	Rutherford Falls	Earl	2 episodes
2021–2022	Reservation Dogs	Uncle Brownie	7 Episodes
2022	Our Flag Means Death	Chief Mabo	Episode: "A Damned Man"
2022	The English	John Clarke	2 Episodes
2023	The Curse	James Toledo	Episode: "Pressure's Looking Good So Far"
2026	The Lowdown	Otis Sharp	
2026	Avatar: Seven Havens	Toklo (voice)	2 Episodes
