= The Horse Flies =

American musical group

- Also known as: Tompkins County Horseflies, Edna's Driveway
- Origin: Ithaca, New York
- Genres: Alternative rock, folk
- Years active: c.1980–2016
- Labels: Rounder, MCA, Pest Control
- Spinoffs: Boy With A Fish, Telltale Crossing
- Past members: Judy Hyman; Jeff Claus; Rich Stearns; Taki Masuko; Jay Olsa; Rick Hansen; John Hayward; Peter Dodge; June Drucker
- Website: thehorseflies.com

The Horse Flies are an American alternative rock/folk band, founded in the late 1970s in Ithaca, NY under the name 'Tompkins County Horseflies' by husband and wife Jeff Claus and Judy Hyman, Richie Stearns and John Hayward.

== Background ==
The four original members of the Horse Flies emerged from the old-time music scene and, in collaboration with percussionist Taki Masuko and keyboardist/accordionist Peter Dodge, would develop their unique sound by twining old-time fiddle tunes with modern art/alt rock influences and world folk music traditions.

Songs by Claus and Stearns included surreal elements that simultaneously evoke Appalachian imagery and the alienated perspective British and American indie rock bands of the 1980s. This link was perhaps most explicit in their reworking of the Cramps' "Human Fly," the title cut of the Horseflies' first album. Claus's homage to their adopted hometown of Ithaca, New York, "I Live Where It's Grey" recalls early Talking Heads and Devo, but the mechanical precision is executed on traditional acoustic instruments. Stearns' adaptation of the lullaby "Hush Little Baby" transforms it into a series of heartfelt promises from someone who has little, but offers everything.

Their second album, "Gravity Dance (1991)," threw the musical balance greatly over to the rock sensibility. Claus's "Sally Ann," later re-recorded by Natalie Merchant, retains the band's connection to Appalachian balladry, while Stearns' "I Need a Plastic Bag (to Keep My Brains In)" and Claus's "Life Is a Rubber Rope" are more nearly "New Wave" pop songs, while Stearns' "Roadkill" mixes a hard rock sensibility into their repertoire.

Hayward, the band's original bassist, died of cancer in 1997. The last Horse Flies recording featuring Hayward was the serendipitously recorded "Live in the Dance Tent," which was taped "from the board" at the 6th Finger Lakes Grassroots Festival of Music and Dance in July 1996.

According to its liner notes, the sessions that form the basis of Two Traditions (2000) were recorded soon after the Live in the Dance Tent performance in an effort to capture some of the energy and beauty of that evening. After Hayward's death, the tapes for the sessions went into producer Jim Roberts closet until 1998. At that time, Roberts added some interstitial material and released the album as a fusion of African and Appalachian traditions in 1999. It was mixed at Pyramid Sound in Ithaca with engineer Alex Perialas. It includes renditions of well known old-time tunes like "Ride Ol'Buck," "Jimmy Sutton," "Emory Bailey," and "John Brown's Dream as well as various originals collaborated by on by Jim Roberts. Judy Hyman, Richie Stearns, Chad Crumm, Ricky Simpkins and Nancy Sluys.

Heartbroken after Hayward's death, the remaining band members put the Horse Flies on hiatus, eventually reemerging publicly under the name Edna's Driveway in 2003, with bassist June Drucker and keyboardist/accordionist Rick Hansen. Not long after, the band reclaimed their name, and the Horse Flies toured Europe and played festivals in the United States.

The Horse Flies' current lineup features:

- Judy Hyman: violin, vocals
- Jeff Claus: guitar, banjo ukulele, vocals
- Rich Stearns: banjo, tenor guitar, vocals
- Taki Masuko: percussion
- Jay Olsa: bass
- Rick Hansen: accordion, organ

In 2008, the band released Until the Ocean, the first album to featuring its current line-up, again reinventing their sound. Until the Ocean features a return to the band's acoustic roots while expounding upon their alternative rock and world music sensibilities. The album features Claus's "Build A House and Burn it Down", a roots-based pop song, and Stearns' "Veins of Coal", a ballad with Appalachian-echoes, as well as Doc Boggs's "Drunkard's Child" and the old-time number, "Cluck Old Hen."

== Side projects and other collaborations ==
In 2000, 2004, and 2010, Hyman and Stearns toured with Natalie Merchant and performed on Merchant's The House Carpenter's Daughter and Leave Your Sleep albums. The House Carpenter's Daughter features Claus's song, "Sally Ann".

Ithaca-based Hyman, Claus, Hansen, and Olsa played in the indie rock band, Boy With A Fish 2004-2013 (www.boywithafish).

Hyman and Claus also create music for film j2filmmusic.com, having done two feature films initially with The Horse Flies ("Where the Rivers Flow North," 1993, and "Stranger in the Kingdom," 1999), and since then working on over 25 features or documentaries.

Stearns has released albums titled Solo, on which he plays banjo, tenor guitar and sings in his back yard, and Missing (2011). He has also released "Tractor Beam" and "Nowhere in Time" with Rosie Newton as Richie and Rosie. Missing was recorded in large part with the Evil City String Band, with whom Sterns regularly plays.

Boston-based Masuko is an active performer, dance accompanist, clinician, and teacher, who frequently collaborates with the vocal ensemble Tapestry, the Zamir Chorale of Boston, Le Bon Vent, and Claire Ritter, among others). His newest project, Telltale Crossing, will release their debut album, featuring performances by Stearns and Peter Dodge, in 2019.

== Discography ==
- Chokers and Flies: Old Time Music (1985) (one-side only; shared album with the Chicken Chokers)
- Human Fly (1987)
- Gravity Dance (1992)
- Where the Rivers Flow North (film score) (1994)
- A Stranger in the Kingdom (film score) (1998)
- Two Traditions (2000)
- In the Dance Tent (2000)
- The Horse Flies at Rhythm & Roots 9/1/06 (2006)
- The Horse Flies at Rhythm & Roots 9/2/06 (2006)
- Until the Ocean (2008)
