= A Stranger in the Kingdom =

- Directed by: Jay Craven
- Written by: Don Bredes; Jay Craven
- Based on: A Stranger in the Kingdom by Howard Frank Mosher
- Produced by: Jay Craven
- Starring: Ernie Hudson; David Lansbury; Martin Sheen; Jean Louisa Kelly
- Cinematography: Philip Holahan
- Edited by: Elizabeth Schwartz
- Music by: The Horse Flies
- Release date: December 4, 1997 (Ellsworth, Maine)
- Running time: 112 minutes
- Country: United States
- Language: English

A Stranger in the Kingdom is a 1997 American drama film directed by Jay Craven and starring Ernie Hudson, David Lansbury, Martin Sheen and Jean Louisa Kelly. It is based on the novel of the same name by Howard Frank Mosher.

== Cast ==
- Ernie Hudson as Reverend Walter Andrews
- Sean Nelson as Nathan
- Bill Raymond as Resolved Kennison
- David Lansbury as Charlie
- Henry Gibson as Zachariah Barrows
- George Dickerson as Sheriff Mason White
- Jordan Bayne as Claire LaRiviere
- Jean Louisa Kelly as Athena
- Michael Ryan Segal as "Frenchy" LeMost
- Rusty DeWees as Harlan Kittredge
- Martin Sheen as Sigurd Moulton
- Larry Pine as Edward Kinneson
- Tom Aldredge as Elijah Kinneson
- Carrie Snodgress as Ruth Kinneson

== Release ==
The film made its premiere at the Grand in Ellsworth, Maine on December 4, 1997. The film was also screened at the Hollywood Film Festival on August 9, 1998.
