= Kenneth Kimmins =

American film, television and theatre actor

- Born: September 4, 1941 (age 84); Brooklyn, New York, U.S.
- Education: Catholic University of America
- Occupations: Film, television and theatre actor
- Years active: 1969–present
- Spouse: Lisa Raggio

Kenneth Kimmins (born September 4, 1941) is an American film, television and theatre actor. He is perhaps best known for playing Howard Burleigh in the American television sitcom Coach.

== Life and career ==
Kimmins was born in Brooklyn, New York, and attended the Catholic University of America. In 1969, he began his acting career playing as Charley Montgomery in the Broadway play The Fig Leaves Are Falling. His theatre credits included The Gingerbread Lady, The Magic Show and Status Quo Vadis.

In 1976, Kimmins appeared in the film Network. He guest-starred in numerous television programs including Hill Street Blues, Soap, Archie Bunker's Place, The Fall Guy, Night Court, The Bob Newhart Show, Hunter, The Love Boat, Dynasty, WKRP in Cincinnati, Cheers, Remington Steele, Highway to Heaven, The West Wing, Silver Spoons and L.A. Law. In 1986, he starred in the CBS's sitcom television series Leo & Liz in Beverly Hills playing Jerry Fedderson, the neighbor of the title characters. He appeared in films such as Invaders from Mars, My Best Friend Is a Vampire, Bridge of Tunnel, Police Academy 6: City Under Siege, Stella, Some Kind of Wonderful and Shoot the Moon. He played the recurring role of Thornton McLeish on 11 episodes in the television soap opera Dallas, and then starred as Howard Burleigh in the new ABC sitcom television series Coach. His character was the boss of the main character Hayden Fox (Craig T. Nelson).

Kimmins played the recurring role of Dr. Bernard Klein in the superhero television series Lois & Clark: The New Adventures of Superman. His final theatre credit was from the Broadway play The Music Man in 2000.
