= Coach (TV series) =

American television sitcom (1989–1997)

- Genre: Sitcom
- Created by: Barry Kemp
- Starring: Craig T. Nelson; Shelley Fabares; Jerry Van Dyke; Bill Fagerbakke; Clare Carey; Kenneth Kimmins; Katherine Helmond
- Theme music composer: John Morris
- Composer: J.A.C. Redford
- Country of origin: United States
- Original language: English
- No. of seasons: 9
- No. of episodes: 200 (list of episodes)

Production
- Executive producer: Barry Kemp
- Running time: 24 minutes
- Production companies: Bungalow 78 Productions; Universal Television

Original release
- Network: ABC
- Release: February 28, 1989 – May 14, 1997

Coach is an American television sitcom that originally ran for nine seasons on ABC from February 28, 1989, to May 14, 1997, with a total of 200 half-hour episodes. The series, created by Barry Kemp, stars Craig T. Nelson as Hayden Fox, head coach of the fictional NCAA Division I-A Minnesota State University Screaming Eagles football team. For the last two seasons, Coach Fox and the supporting characters coached the Orlando Breakers, a fictional National Football League expansion team. The program also starred Jerry Van Dyke as Luther Van Dam and Bill Fagerbakke as Michael "Dauber" Dybinski, assistant coaches under Fox. The role of Hayden's girlfriend (and later wife) Christine Armstrong, a television news anchor, was played by Shelley Fabares.

== Plot ==
In early seasons, Coach Hayden Fox continues to come to grips with the emerging womanhood of his "little girl", Kelly, now a college student played by Clare Carey, who after being raised mostly by her mother, enrolled at Minnesota State mainly because she wanted to be near her father. Kelly dated (and eventually married in the second season) theater mime Stuart Rosebrock (Kris Kamm), whom Hayden could not stand. Their marriage ended in 1991 after Stuart, returning from filming his own kids TV show, Buzzy the Beaver, told Kelly that he had met another woman. While overtly supporting Kelly with her heartbreak, Coach Fox clandestinely could not have been happier to have "Stu" out of both of their lives. After graduating from Minnesota State in 1993, Kelly was hired by a major ad agency in New York. She was only seen in occasional guest spots thereafter (and not at all after season 7).

Much of Hayden's coaching job, besides mentoring his players, was working with his defensive coordinator and assistant head coach Luther Van Dam (Jerry Van Dyke). Van Dam was a lifelong bachelor who often struggled with self-confidence, and is portrayed as Hayden's best friend. Additionally, they worked with special teams coach Michael "Dauber" Dybinski (Bill Fagerbakke). He is an ex-player at Minnesota State and a kind-hearted, naive "dumb jock" figure. Throughout the show, there is an ongoing joke that he had not yet graduated from Minnesota State, despite being enrolled there for several years. Despite his seemingly simple nature, Dauber would often surprisingly be of intellectual help to the team. This was usually learned from a class he was attending, or from being a fan of Nova. Dauber would later graduate with three bachelor's degrees in physical education, business administration, and forestry – without even knowing he was eligible for all three until he got his transcript.

Women's basketball coach Judy Watkins (Pam Stone) often engaged in prank wars with Hayden. His relationship with her was complicated by the fact that Dauber dated her until 1995, when she confessed to an affair after returning from a coaching job in Romania. Also seen throughout the run was fussy, budget-conscious Minnesota State athletic director Howard Burleigh (Kenneth Kimmins) and his cheerful wife, Shirley (Georgia Engel), who were close friends with Hayden and Christine.

At the end of season 7, Hayden is offered a job with a fictional NFL expansion team called the Orlando Breakers. Hayden agrees and takes his coaching staff with him for the final two seasons. The Foxes adopted a baby boy named Timothy (played by twins Brennan and Brian Felker). Many season 9 episodes focused on the couple's newfound joy of parenthood, as they had been unable to conceive a child together before they decided to adopt.

== Episodes ==
Season	Episodes	Originally released		Rank	Rating
Season	Episodes	First released	Last released	Rank	Rating
1	13	February 28, 1989	June 7, 1989	72	9.2
2	20	November 21, 1989	May 15, 1990	18	17.0
3	22	September 25, 1990	April 9, 1991	18	15.3
4	22	October 1, 1991	May 19, 1992	10	16.7 (Note: Tied with Room for Two.)
5	23	September 22, 1992	May 19, 1993	6	17.5
6	27	September 14, 1993	May 24, 1994	6	17.4
7	25	September 12, 1994	May 10, 1995	53	10.5
8	25	September 12, 1995	May 21, 1996	14	12.9 (Note: Tied with The NBC Monday Movie.)
9	23	September 28, 1996	May 14, 1997	64	8.1

=== "Viva Las Vegas" ===
The 9th-season episode "Viva Las Ratings" is part of a crossover with Grace Under Fire, The Drew Carey Show, and Ellen set in Las Vegas. It features Kathy Kinney as Mimi Bobeck, Drew Carey as Drew Carey, Joely Fisher as Paige Clark, and Jeremy Piven as Spence Kovak.

== Development ==
The creator and producer of the show, Barry Kemp, an alumnus of the University of Iowa, paid homage to his alma mater by naming the main character of Coach (Hayden Fox) after the University of Iowa's longtime football coach Hayden Fry. Many of the exterior shots of "Minnesota State" are actually of the University of Iowa, usually of students walking around the Iowa Memorial Union in downtown Iowa City. The screen shot when returning from commercial breaks is of the outside of the Hillcrest dormitory. There are also numerous shots of Quadrangle Residence Hall as well as the Field House, which once served as the venue for University of Iowa basketball.

== Cast ==
=== Principal cast ===
Actor	Role	Years
Craig T. Nelson	Hayden Fox	1989–1997
Shelley Fabares	Christine Armstrong	1989–1997
Jerry Van Dyke	Luther Van Dam	1989–1997
Bill Fagerbakke	Michael "Dauber" Dybinski	1989–1997
Kenneth Kimmins	Howard Burleigh	1989–1997
Clare Carey	Kelly Fox	1989–1994
Katherine Helmond	Doris Sherman	1995–1997
Kris Kamm	Stuart Rosebrock	1989–1991
Georgia Engel	Shirley Burleigh	1991–1997

=== Recurring roles and guest stars ===
- Troy Aikman as himself
- George Allen as himself
- Phyllis Avery
- Rick Barry as himself
- Raye Birk as Riley Pringle
- Jim Boeke as Mr. Dybinski
- Dick Butkus as himself
- K Callan as Marion
- Kennedy Cash as newborn Timothy David ("T.D.") Fox
- Drew Carey as himself
- Gil Christner as Father O'Malley
- Tim Conway as Kenny Montague
- Pat Crawford Brown as Mrs. Thorkelson
- Mike Ditka as himself
- Vlade Divac as Delivery Boy
- Paul Dooley as Horace Van Dam
- Elinor Donahue as Lorraine
- Christopher B. Duncan as Bo Whitley
- Georgia Engel as Shirley Burleigh
- Nanette Fabray as Mildred Armstrong
- Mike Farrell as Jeffrey
- Brennan Felker as Timothy David ("T.D.") Fox
- Brian Felker as Timothy David ("T.D.") Fox
- Eddie George as himself
- Frank Gifford as himself
- Kathie Lee Gifford as herself
- Beth Grant as Martha
- Bob Griese as himself
- Mary Hart as herself
- Brent Hinkley as Delivery Man
- Lou Holtz as himself
- Monica Horan as Maureen
- Keith Jackson as himself
- Jimmy Johnson as himself
- Keyshawn Johnson as himself
- Jerry Jones as himself
- Vicki Juditz as Rosemary
- Lenore Kasdorf as Beth Fox
- Lisa Kudrow as Lauren
- A. J. Langer as Julie
- Lucy Liu as Nicole Wong
- Julio Oscar Mechoso as Martin
- Dick Martin as Peter Plunkett
- Al Michaels as himself
- Kathy Kinney as Mimi Bobeck
- Priscilla Morrill as Pamela Rizzendough
- Noah Nelson as Kevin
- Andrea Parker as Penny/Jean
- Tom Poston as Dr. Art Hibke, dentist / jeweler
- Robert Prosky as Jake "The Snake" Connelly
- Rob Schneider as Leonard Pierre Kraleman
- Pam Stone as Judy Watkins
- Hank Stram as himself
- Robin Strasser as Elaine Tewksbury
- Barry Switzer as himself
- Todd Susman as Bill
- Rita Taggart as Ruthanne
- Joe Theismann as himself
- Johnny Unitas as himself
- John Valdetero as John
- Dick Van Dyke as Extra
- Yul Vazquez as Alberto Roca
- Bobby Vinton as himself
- Terrence Howard as Johnny Williams
- James Pickens Jr., as Rick Williams
- Doria Cook-Nelson as Pamela
- Alan Young as Ranger Farley

=== Family connections ===
- Nanette Fabray, Shelley Fabares's aunt, appeared as Christine Armstrong's mother, Mildred, in four episodes.
- Mike Farrell, Shelley Fabares's husband, appeared as Jeffrey in one episode.
- Noah Nelson, Craig T. Nelson's son, appeared as Kevin, the biological father of the baby whom Hayden and Christine Fox adopt, in two episodes. He also appeared as Minnesota State football player Cody Wilson in one episode and as a delivery boy in another episode.
- Dick Van Dyke, Jerry Van Dyke's brother, appeared as an uncredited extra in one episode as one of Luther's distant relatives.

== Setting ==
=== Minnesota State University ===
In 1963, several bills before the Minnesota State Legislature were developed to create a research university at what was then Mankato State College. Representative Mike McGuire of Montgomery, Minnesota, submitted an amendment that would have changed the name of the institution to Minnesota State University.

During the series run, no school was officially named Minnesota State University. Separately, in 1998 (a year after the show ended), an act of the Minnesota legislature allowed for the renaming of Mankato State University to Minnesota State University, Mankato because of its growing size and to provide better recognition across the Midwest region. As a reaction to this and at the urging of the Board of Trustees of the Minnesota State Colleges and Universities System, two years later, in 2000, Moorhead State University was also renamed Minnesota State University Moorhead to try to provide parity to other regions regarding the impact of the Mankato name change. The common nickname of Minnesota State has always traditionally referred to Minnesota State University, Mankato, since this historical period. The athletic programs at Mankato are widely referred to in the media as "Minnesota State", without a city identifier, although its sports teams are named the Mavericks instead of Screaming Eagles; however, both the fictional and real-life Minnesota State universities share purple and yellow as school colors.

There are several similarities between fictional Minnesota State University and the real-world Minnesota State Mankato. The Minnesota State Screaming Eagles school colors of purple and gold are also the colors for Minnesota State Mankato and the Minnesota Vikings. The location for the fictional Minnesota State University is never established; however, in several episodes it is mentioned that the campus is located about an hour away from the Twin Cities. The distance from Minneapolis to Mankato is approximately an hour away by car. Coach Hayden Fox is shown to live in a cabin near a lake, similarly to how several Minnesota State Mankato faculty members live in cabins on nearby Lake Washington. The founding of the fictional university is shown to be 1867 in the opening credits and the real university at times was also referred to as being founded in 1867. Later decisions by school administration placed the official date as being founded in 1868.

Cast of Coach in Seasons 8 and 9 (left to right): Kenneth Kimmins, Shelley Fabares, Craig T. Nelson, Bill Fagerbakke, Katherine Helmond, and Jerry Van Dyke.

During the course of the show, Minnesota State's college football conference affiliation is never mentioned. The Screaming Eagles were mentioned to play big-name schools like Michigan State and Tennessee, but other fictional schools, such as Western Colorado, (Note: Similar to the case of Minnesota State, an actual school in Colorado adopted a similar name, Western State Colorado University, in 2012.) are also mentioned. In the intro of the show, it is shown that Hayden got his coaching start at Chattanooga University, a fictionalized version of the real-life University of Tennessee at Chattanooga (which brands its athletic program as "Chattanooga"). Outdoor shots of campus and stadium were filmed at Kinnick Stadium at the University of Iowa in Iowa City, Iowa, where creator Barry Kemp went to college. In several episodes, Hayden Fox refers to visiting Christine in the Twin Cities, and it is evident that he is maintaining a long-distance relationship.

In the early 1990s, the producers of the show held a contest to have a real college marching band record the theme song for the show. The contest was won by the Iowa State University Cyclone Football 'Varsity' Marching Band, and their recording was used as the theme until the series ended. The Iowa State University Cyclone Football 'Varsity' Marching Band was also shown in the opening sequence of the show.

In the 1993–1994 television season, Hayden Fox led his Minnesota State Screaming Eagles to victory in the Pioneer Bowl, held in San Antonio, winning the national championship. In real life, Florida State won the national championship that season. The Alamodome opened in May 1993, in time for the real-life 1993 football season. However, the first Alamo Bowl and Pioneer Bowl games had not been played yet. Also, the real-life Pioneer Bowl is not even an NCAA Division I game, but rather a now-defunct postseason game played between the champions of two Division II conferences whose members are all historically black schools (the game ceased to be held after 2012). Footage from the 1993 edition of the Wisconsin vs. Minnesota rivalry game played in the Metrodome was used for the actual game to represent Minnesota State and the fictional West Texas University (not to be confused with the real West Texas A&M University or Texas Western College, now known as UTEP). Then-ABC sportscaster Al Michaels provides the commentary during the game.

=== Orlando Breakers ===
In the 1995 season, Hayden Fox gets a chance to fulfill his ultimate dream and become the head coach of an NFL team. He accepts the head coaching position with the (fictional) expansion team the Orlando Breakers, owned by recent widow Doris Sherman (played by Katherine Helmond). Sherman, however, is more interested in making money off of the team as well as gimmicks (such as asking if Hayden would like to coach a basketball team she was thinking of buying after selling the Breakers and trading away their first-round draft pick for a pair of cruise tickets) than she is in letting Coach Fox guide the Breakers to success on the football field. Nearly the entire crew from Minnesota State followed Fox to Orlando, including Luther and Dauber, who remained his assistant coaches. In the final season, Hayden is able to coach the Breakers to a wild card spot in the NFL Playoffs but loses to the Buffalo Bills in a 63-0 blowout in a snowy playoff game at Highmark Stadium (New York).

The name Orlando Breakers was a salute to the original USFL and the Boston/New Orleans/Portland Breakers. The Breakers themselves were a parody of the fellow Florida-based Jacksonville Jaguars, who, like the Breakers, joined the NFL in 1995 as an expansion team and made the playoffs their second season as a wild card team and, like the Breakers, played the Bills in their first playoff game. (Unlike the Breakers, the Jaguars came out victorious, 30–27, eventually losing to the New England Patriots 20–6 in the AFC Championship Game.) Another tie-in between the Breakers and the Jaguars was that the first game the latter played in, the 1995 Pro Football Hall of Fame Game (against their expansion brethren the Carolina Panthers), aired on ABC, the same network as Coach.

=== Series finale ===
The 200th and final episode of the sitcom, titled "Leaving Orlando", aired on ABC on May 14, 1997. The final scene in the final episode featured the whole cast thanking the audience for eight and a half years of the show and showing a plaque commemorating it, with cast member Jerry Van Dyke denying the series ending, thinking the show must go on. But the cast and director finally tell Van Dyke that the show is truly over, with Van Dyke still denying the show's finale: As the lights go out, Van Dyke mumbles, "I don't care what you say, I'm coming to work Monday."

The final episode also includes an epilogue showing that Hayden retired from coaching and moved back to his cabin in Minnesota to raise his son, with Christine being a working wife at a local station. Luther also retired and continued his relationship with Doris, building a Graceland style manor as tribute to his idol, Elvis Presley. Howard and Shirley sold their collection of rare Barbie dolls, using the capital to acquire and manage a successful dinner theatre in Florida. Dauber succeeded Hayden as the head coach of the Breakers, winning back-to-back Super Bowl championships and going on to join the Monday Night Football announcing team after his retirement from football. The final scene shows a 10-year-old Tim having two friends who bear a striking resemblance to child versions of Dauber and Luther.

== Syndication ==
The show entered local syndication reruns in September 1993. Reruns have also previously aired on Antenna TV, ReelzChannel, WGN America, USA Network, Nick at Nite and TBS.

Netflix discontinued Coach on September 15, 2015.

Roku currently offers the entire series free on demand.

The entire run of the series is currently being shown on Amazon Prime as of December 13, 2025.

== Awards and nominations ==
- Emmy Awards:
  - 1992: Primetime Emmy Award for Outstanding Lead Actor – Comedy Series (Craig T. Nelson)
  - 1996: Primetime Emmy Award for Outstanding Guest Actor – Comedy Series (Tim Conway)
- American Society of Composers, Authors and Publishers (ASCAP) Awards:
  - 1992: Top TV Series
  - 1993: Top TV Series
  - 1994: Top TV Series
  - 1995: Top TV Series
  - 1996: Top TV Series

== Scheduling conflict with Monday Night Football ==
For season seven, ABC aired original episodes of Coach on Monday night, before Monday Night Football, as part of a football-themed night. This was successful on the United States east coast, where MNF games aired from 9:00 pm to 12:30 am, local time. However, on the west coast, MNF games aired from 6:00 pm to 9:30 pm (with possible overtime), leaving some Monday network programming with no time slots. During this interval, the show was aired at unusual hours on the west coast. For instance, Seattle ABC affiliate KOMO aired new episodes of Coach on Saturday afternoons (coincidentally, ABC also aired college football games most of the time on Saturday afternoons). Some fans have cited this time-slot displacement on the west coast as a reason for low ratings in season seven. Coach was moved to Wednesday nights before the end of the season, and was then moved back to Tuesday nights the following season; this resulted in a bump in ratings, returning Coach to the top 20.

== Home media ==
Universal Pictures has released the first four seasons of Coach on DVD in Region 1. Two different versions were released of the first season: a regular edition and a limited edition which featured special packaging (a playbook).

On July 1, 2016, it was announced that Mill Creek Entertainment had acquired the rights to the series in Region 1; they subsequently re-released the first two seasons on DVD on September 6, 2016.

On September 12, 2017, Mill Creek released Coach – The Complete Series on DVD in Region 1 for the very first time. The 18-disc set contains all 9 seasons of the series, the first time episodes beyond season 4 have been available on DVD.

Universal Pictures UK released season 1 on DVD in Region 2 on August 7, 2006.

DVD name	Ep#	Release date
The First Season	13	June 13, 2006
The Second Season	20	May 15, 2007
The Third Season	22	February 19, 2008
The Fourth Season	22	March 15, 2011
The Complete Series	200	September 12, 2017

== Attempted sequel ==
On March 26, 2015, NBC ordered 13 episodes of a sequel series to Coach, set to focus on Hayden Fox's son, who had recently taken a coaching job at a small college. Most of the original series' stars were set to reprise their roles, except for Shelley Fabares who was battling autoimmune hepatitis. Her role as Christine, Hayden's wife, was to be written off as having died with Hayden written as a recent widower. On August 31, 2015, TVLine reported the series had been cancelled due to the pilot having "mixed results".

== Reboot ==
In October 2026, it was announced that a single-camera reboot of Coach was in the works with Ty Burrell set to star, executive produce, and co-write alongside Daniel Libman and Matthew Libman.
