= Disappearances (film) =

- Directed by: Jay Craven
- Based on: Disappearances (1977) by Howard Frank Mosher
- Starring: Kris Kristofferson
- Cinematography: Wolfgang Held
- Release date: March 11, 2007 (New York)
- Budget: $1,500,000 (estimated)

Disappearances is a 2006 independent film by director Jay Craven starring Kris Kristofferson, based on a 1977 novel of the same name by Howard Frank Mosher.

== Plot ==
Quebec Bill Bonhomme is a hardy schemer and dreamer, who, desperate to raise money to preserve his endangered herd through the rapidly approaching winter, resorts to whiskey-smuggling, a traditional family occupation. Quebec Bill takes his son, Wild Bill, on the journey. Traveling with them are Henry Coville, an inscrutable whiskey smuggler, and Rat Kinneson, Quebec Bill's perpetually disconsolate ex-con hired man. Together, they cross the border into vast reaches of Canadian wilderness for an unforgettable four days "full of terror, full of wonder."

== Production ==
After a budget shortfall, Craven took out a second mortgage on his house to complete the film.

The dialogue from the movie was used in the video game Gun for PlayStation 2.

== Reception ==
On Rotten Tomatoes, the film has a critics' rating of 52% and an audience rating of 44%. Their summary reads, "Disappearances benefits from a well-cast Kris Kristofferson in the lead role, but his presence isn't always enough to disguise an increasingly nonsensical story." The film received mixed reviews from the New York Times, New York Daily News, and Time Out, and negative reviews from Newsday and the Chicago Reader. On Metacritic, the film has a score of 57, indicating mixed reviews.

The film received the Grand Jury Award for Best Feature at the 2007 DC Independent Film Festival.

== Cast ==
- Kris Kristofferson as. William "Quebec Bill" Bonhomme Sr.
- Geneviève Bujold as Cordelia Bonhomme
- William Sanderson as Muskrat "Rat" Kinneson
- Charlie McDermott as William "Wild Bill" Bonhomme Jr.
- Gary Farmer as Henry Coville
- Lothaire Bluteau as "Carcajou" / William Shakespeare Goodman
- Heather Rae as Evangeline Bonhomme
- Bill Raymond as Compton
- Luis Guzman as Brother St. Hillaire
- John Griesemer as Brother St. Paul
- Christy Scott Cashman as Yellow Rose
- Rusty DeWees as "Frog" LaMundy (credited as Rusty Dewees)
- Steve Small as Origene LaChance
- Josh Pellerin as Andre LaChance
- Munson Hicks as Sheriff
- Teresa Klein as Gretchen "Little Gretchen"
- William Rough as The Bartender
