= Ethan Frome (film) =

1993 film by John Madden

- Theatrical release poster
- Directed by: John Madden
- Screenplay by: Richard Nelson
- Based on: Ethan Frome by Edith Wharton
- Produced by: Stan Wlodkowski
- Starring: Liam Neeson; Patricia Arquette; Joan Allen; Tate Donovan; Katharine Houghton
- Cinematography: Bobby Bukowski
- Edited by: Katherine Wenning
- Music by: Rachel Portman
- Distributed by: Miramax Films
- Release date: March 5, 1993
- Running time: 100 minutes
- Countries: United Kingdom; United States
- Language: English
- Box office: $296,081

Ethan Frome is a 1993 historical romantic drama film directed by John Madden from a screenplay by Richard Nelson, based on the 1911 novella by Edith Wharton. The film stars Liam Neeson, Patricia Arquette, Joan Allen and Tate Donovan.

== Plot ==
Reverend Smith has arrived in Starkfield from Boston. He notices that Ethan Frome is isolated. Smith encourages his parishioners to be charitable.

Ethan and Zeena Pierce are distant cousins. After marrying Zeena, Ethan falls in love with Mattie Silver.

== Cast ==
- Liam Neeson – Ethan Frome
- Patricia Arquette – Mattie Silver
- Joan Allen – Zenobia "Zeena" Frome
- Tate Donovan – Reverend Smith
- Stephen Mendillo – Ned Hale
- Phil Garran – Mr. Howe
- Virginia Smith – Mrs. Howe
- Annie Nessen – Sarah Anne Howe
- Katharine Houghton – Mrs. Hale
- George Woodard – Jotham Powell
- Jay Goede – Denis Eady

== Release ==
=== Reception ===
Ethan Frome received mixed reviews from critics. On Rotten Tomatoes, the film holds a rating of 54% from 13 reviews.

=== Home media ===
The film was released on DVD by Echo Bridge Entertainment on October 11, 2011. The film debuted on Blu-ray on September 11, 2012 in a double feature with Ruby Cairo (2012). Neither film has any extras on the disc.
