= My Mother's Early Lovers =

- Directed by: Nora Jacobson
- Screenplay by: Nora Jacobson; Sybil Smith
- Based on: My Mother's Early Lovers by Sybil Smith
- Produced by: Nora Jacobson
- Starring: Sue Ball; George Woodard
- Cinematography: Roger Grange
- Edited by: Nora Jacobson
- Music by: David Ferm
- Release date: September 24, 1998 (Angelika Film Center)
- Running time: 105 minutes
- Country: United States
- Language: English

My Mother's Early Lovers is a 1998 American drama film directed by Nora Jacobson and starring Sue Ball and George Woodard. It is Jacobson's feature directorial debut and based on Sybil Smith's semi-autobiographical novella of the same name.

== Cast ==
- Sue Ball
- George Woodard
- Molly Hickok
- Gilman Rood
- Dudley Rood
- Kim Meredith
- Kathy Blume
- Jacob Crumbine
- Emily Gartner
- Michael Kenne

== Release ==
The film premiered at the Angelika Film Center on September 24, 1998.

== Reception ==
Ron Weiskind of the Pittsburgh Post-Gazette awarded the film two and a half stars.
