= Bess O'Brien =

American film producer and director

Bess O'Brien is an American film producer and director.

In 2016, her film The Hungry Heart won the Media Award from the National Institute on Drug Abuse (NIDA) and the College on Problems of Drug Dependence.

In 2021, she created the Listen Up Musical. She is married to filmmaker Jay Craven.

== Filmography ==
=== Producer ===
- Where the Rivers Flow North (1993)

=== Director ===
- Shout It Out! (2008)
- The Hungry Heart (2013)
- Coming Home (2018)
- All of Me (2016)
- Just Getting By (2024)
