= Howard Frank Mosher =

American writer

Howard Frank Mosher, from his website.

Howard Frank Mosher (June 2, 1942 – January 29, 2017) was an American author of thirteen books: eleven fiction and two non-fiction. Much of his fiction takes place in the mid-20th century and all of it is set in the Northeast Kingdom of Vermont, usually in his fictional "Kingdom County".

His characters are often quirky, reflecting the distinctive peculiarities of the region's taciturn residents. The community struggle with changing times is often a theme, with the more traditional ways of rural Yankee life coming in conflict with an expanding, modern society. The last novel published during his lifetime was God's Kingdom (St. Martin's Press, October 2015).

== Personal life ==
Mosher graduated from Cato-Meridian Central School, in Cato, New York, in 1960 and from Syracuse University in 1964. He taught English at Orleans High and Lake Region Union High School during his early years.

Mosher lived with his wife, Phillis, in Irasburg, Vermont. They had a grown son and a daughter. He was a die-hard Red Sox fan, and this was a recurring element in his work. Mosher often developed a fictional character (usually still in boyhood) who would become obsessed with the fate of the Red Sox.

== Death ==
In December 2016, Mosher was ill with what he believed to be an upper respiratory ailment. He was soon diagnosed with an aggressive form of cancer, induced from treatment of prostate cancer in 2007. Mosher announced his latest cancer via his Facebook page. He died at home on January 29, 2017, at age 74.

== Awards ==
Mosher was a Guggenheim Fellow in 1979, and is the 1981 recipient of the Literature Award bestowed by the American Academy and Institute of Arts and Letters. A Stranger In the Kingdom won the New England Book Award for Fiction in 1991, and was later made into a 1997 feature film of the same name by director Jay Craven. Craven has also adapted Disappearances, Where the Rivers Flow North and Northern Borders to film. In 2006, Mosher received the Vermont Governor's Award for Excellence in the Arts. In 2011 he was awarded the New England Independent Booksellers Association's President's Award for Lifetime Achievement in the Arts.

== Bibliography ==
His books, in order of publication, are:

1. Disappearances (1977)
2. Where the Rivers Flow North (1978)
3. Marie Blythe (1983)
4. A Stranger in the Kingdom (1989)
5. Northern Borders (1994)
6. North Country (nonfiction, 1997)
7. The Fall of the Year (1999)
8. The True Account (2003)
9. Waiting for Teddy Williams (2004)
10. On Kingdom Mountain (2007)
11. Walking to Gatlinburg (2010)
12. The Great Northern Express (nonfiction, 2012)
13. God's Kingdom (2015)
14. Points North: Stories (2018)
