= Sue Ball =

American actress (born 1967)

- Born: Susan Gabrielle Ball; March 2, 1967 (age 59); Philadelphia, Pennsylvania
- Education: University of Vermont
- Occupation: Actress

Susan Gabrielle Ball (born March 2, 1967, in Philadelphia, Pennsylvania) is an American actress and vegetarian. She stopped acting in her early twenties, and now dabbles in photography. She is best known for her starring role in Leo & Liz in Beverly Hills, which was created by Steve Martin. She has had many guest starring and recurring roles, most notably on Rags to Riches, Perfect Strangers, Valerie, and It's a Living.

== Early life ==
Ball was born in Philadelphia, Pennsylvania. As a teen, she was selected to participate as an actress in the Sundance Institute's prestigious Director's Workshop.

== Filmography ==
=== Television ===
Year	Title	Role
1987–1988	Rags to Riches	Marnie
1987	Perfect Strangers	Elaine Appleton
1986	Our House	Hannah Mae 'Smokey' Dawson
1986	It's a Living	Lori Miller
1986	Leo & Liz in Beverly Hills	Mitzi Green
1986	Valerie	Hilary

=== Films ===
Year	Title	Role	Other Notes
2004	Nothing Like Dreaming	Sue	Feature film
1999	Moving Targets	Zoe Crowe	Feature film
1998	My Mother's Early Lovers	Maple	Feature film
