= Northern Borders =

- Film poster
- Directed by: Jay Craven
- Written by: Jay Craven
- Based on: Northern Borders by Howard Frank Mosher
- Produced by: Jay Craven; Chip Hourihan
- Starring: Bruce Dern; Geneviève Bujold; Seamus Davey-Fitzpatrick
- Cinematography: James B. Heck
- Edited by: Jonah Greenstein; Josh Melrod
- Music by: Jeff Claus; Judy Hyman
- Production company: Kingdom County Productions
- Distributed by: Screen Media Films
- Release date: April 9, 2013
- Running time: 108 minutes
- Country: United States
- Language: English

Northern Borders is a 2013 American drama film written and directed by Jay Craven, and based on Howard Frank Mosher's novel of the same name. It stars Bruce Dern, Geneviève Bujold and Seamus Davey-Fitzpatrick.

== Plot ==
In 1956, Austen Kittredge is sent to live with his conservative grandparents in Vermont. Austen Sr. and his wife Abiah have lived together for fifty years, but they do not speak to each other directly and actually despise each other. Austen, called "Tut" by his Egypt-obsessed grandmother (the daughters are Nefertiti and Cleopatra) must do farm chores, even though he dislikes the idea. Austen goes to school and meets Theresa, whose family is poor. In addition to living amidst the conflict between his grandparents, Austen must deal with their reluctance to join the modern world, hoping they will overcome this.

== Cast ==
- Bruce Dern as Austen Kittredge Sr.
- Geneviève Bujold as Abiah Kittredge
- Seamus Davey-Fitzpatrick as Austen Kittredge II
- Tom Bodett as Station Master
- Samantha Cheirif as Bumper Stevens' Girlfriend
- Brent Crawford as Rob
- Rusty DeWees as "Bumper" Stevens
- Jim Fitzpatrick as J.W. Kittredge
- John Griesemer as Bailiff
- Jessica Hecht as Liz Kittredge
- Jacqueline Hennessy as Theresa Dubois
- Alicia Hunt as Nefertiti
- John Kiedaisch as Zack Barrows
- Nettie Lane as Mrs. Dubois
- Mark Margolis as "Whiskeyjack" Kittredge
- Tara O'Reilly as Nurse
- Kaley Ronayne as Cleopatra
- John Rothman as Judge Allen
- Jay O. Sanders as Agent Sanders
- Irene Shamas as Hettie
- John Shea as "Doc" Harrison
- Karin Shearer as Mrs. Armstrong

== Reception ==
On review aggregator Rotten Tomatoes, the film holds an approval rating of 40% based on five reviews, with an average rating of 6.08/10." On Metacritic, the film has a weighted average score of 44 out of 100, based on four critics, indicating "mixed or average reviews".

Peter Keough of The Boston Globe wrote, "Craven's erratic tonal shifts from the whimsical to the sentimental trip up the episodic plot." Neil Genzlinger of The New York Times wrote, "The most interesting thing about the movie is its origin story."
