= The Dark Divide =

- Film poster
- Directed by: Tom Putnam
- Written by: Tom Putnam
- Based on: Where Bigfoot Walks: Crossing the Dark Divide by: Robert Michael Pyle
- Produced by: Aaron Boyd; Ryan Frost; Tom Putnam; Jory Weitz; David Cross
- Starring: David Cross; Debra Messing
- Distributed by: Strike Back Studios
- Release date: September 18, 2020
- Running time: 107 minutes
- Country: United States
- Language: English

The Dark Divide is a 2020 feature film based on the memoir Where Bigfoot Walks: Crossing the Dark Divide by Robert Michael Pyle.

== Plot ==
Pyle, a lepidopterist, sets out on a 30-day trek through the Gifford Pinchot National Forest to document butterflies and moths following his wife’s terminal ovarian cancer diagnosis. An inexperienced hiker, Pyle encounters challenges including frightening wildlife and getting lost in a cave. When he completes the hike, taking far more days than he had expected to, he leaves the wilderness with a sense of accomplishment.

== Cast ==
- David Cross as Robert Michael Pyle
- Debra Messing as Thea Linnea Pyle
- Cameron Esposito as Monty
- Gary Farmer as Densmore
- Kimberly Guerrero as Teresa
- Patterson Hood as Joe
- David Koechner as Shayne
- Peyton Dilweg as Maggie
- Dyami Thomas as Billy
- Olivia Ritchie as Amie
- Brian Adrian Koch as Joey

== Production ==
The movie was filmed almost entirely on location in the places the action was set. Director Tom Putnam credited his background as a documentary film director for making this feasible. He said, "Because of my documentary background, we were able to construct a film that used a small crew to reach locations larger films could never go to...If you see David [Cross] hanging off a cliff, braving a thunderstorm, or struggling in freezing water, that's really him. When you see lava tunnels deep underground, that's where we shot."

== Release ==
The film was released virtually on September 18, 2020, due to the COVID-19 pandemic. The film's website noted that some of the film's proceeds would be donated to "protect wildlife and wild places."

== Reception ==
Writing for The Hollywood Reporter, critic Frank Scheck called the film "awfully entertaining" and praised Cross's "touching and funnily self-effacing turn." The Austin Chronicle's Richard Whittaker praised the film as "a beautiful, quiet, lyrical, funny wilderness trip, a meditation on loss and picking up the pieces, and the most perfectly poignant performance of David Cross' acting career."
