= The Cobblestone Corridor =

American television series

- Genre: Mystery; Comedy; Drama; Neo-Noir
- Created by: Erik Bloomquist
- Based on: The Cobblestone Corridor (short film)
- Written by: Erik Bloomquist
- Directed by: Erik Bloomquist
- Starring: Erik Bloomquist; Danielle Bonanno; Michael Bakkensen; Ehad Berisha; Nick Moss; Camrus Johnson; Amelia Dudley; Taylor Turner; Bill Raymond
- Composer: Gyom Amphoux
- Country of origin: United States
- Original language: English
- No. of seasons: 1
- No. of episodes: 5

Production
- Executive producers: Erik Bloomquist; Danielle Bonanno; Carson Bloomquist
- Producers: Greg White; Raz Cunningham
- Production locations: Hartford, Connecticut; Simsbury, Connecticut
- Cinematography: Thomson Nguyen
- Editor: Erik Bloomquist
- Camera setup: Single camera
- Running time: 26 minutes
- Production company: Mainframe Pictures

Original release
- Network: CPTV
- Release: October 16, 2016

The Cobblestone Corridor is an American television series created by Erik Bloomquist that premiered on Sunday, October 16, 2016, on CPTV. The series is produced by Mainframe Pictures and is based on the short of the same name.

== Plot ==
At Alfred Pierce Preparatory School, a group of intelligent and diverse student newspaper staffers investigate the institution's most exciting and forbidden mysteries as The Cobblestone Corridor explores the definitions of truth, progress, and tradition.

== Cast ==
=== Series regulars ===
- Erik Bloomquist as Allan Archer
- Danielle Bonanno as Claire Robinson
- Michael Bakkensen as Mr. Brown
- Ehad Berisha as Tim Hunter
- Nick Moss as Brock Larson
- Camrus Johnson as Dex Murphy
- Amelia Dudley as Kate
- Taylor Turner as Lewis
- Bill Raymond as Dr. Carroll

=== Recurring ===
- Adam Weppler as Johnny Baker
- Caitlin Davis as Elizabeth Merriweather
- Kyle Edward Cranston as The Chairman
- Greta Quezada as Anita Sanchez
- Caren Anton as Judy
- Cathy Salvodon as Ms. Prescott
- Sarah Jun as Kimmy Takenaka

== Production ==
The series is based on the two-time Emmy Award nominated short film of the same name. After premiering on May 4, 2015, in Hartford, Connecticut. The short was acclaimed by several domestic and foreign media outlets. Season 1 began production on December 19, 2015, and concluded on March 23, 2016. Principal photography took place primarily at University of Connecticut School of Law in Hartford, Connecticut and Ethel Walker School in Simsbury, Connecticut.

== Episodes ==
No. overall	No. in season	Title	Original release date
1	1	"The Information Age"	October 16, 2016
Alfred Pierce Preparatory School becomes a hotbed for suspense and intrigue after a prank targeting the Associate Headmaster.
2	2	"The Sting"	October 23, 2016
After the school mascot is stolen from the field house, Archer and company go on an undercover mission to recover it.
3	3	"The Informant"	October 30, 2016
Archer becomes suspicious of a fellow student and turns to one of his informants to find out the real story.
4	4	"The Time Capsule"	November 6, 2016
A one hundred year old time capsule is unearthed as the Alfred Pierce community prepares for the annual Spring Formal.
5	5	"The Spring Formal"	November 13, 2016
Secrets are revealed after the winner of The Pierce Prize is announced to the school community.

== Awards ==
The series was awarded three New England Emmy Awards in 2017: Outstanding Director for Erik Bloomquist, Outstanding Writer for Bloomquist, and Outstanding Performer for Nick Moss. The series received six additional nominations, including: Outstanding Arts/Entertainment, Outstanding Promo, Outstanding Editor, and Outstanding Promo for Ehad Berisha, Erik Bloomquist, and Danielle Bonanno.
