= Lost Nation (film) =

2024 American film

Lost Nation is a 2024 film about Ethan Allen and Lucy Terry Prince directed by Jay Craven.

== Cast ==
- Kevin Ryan as Ethan Allen
- Eva Ndachi as Lucy Terry Prince
- Matt Orduna as Abijah Prince
- Rob Campbell as John Noyes
- Ryan Bourque as Ira Allen
- Barry Del Sherman as Justus Sherwood
- Joe Perrino as Seth Warner
- T. Ryder Smith as Crean Brush
- Ariel Zevon as Mary Allen
- Jeremy Rishe as Pastor Samuel Knight
- Cameron Scoggins as Gideon Brownson
- Del Zamora as Peter Squando
- Rusty DeWees as Asa Locke
- Griffin Stanton-Ameisen as Alexander Hamilton (credited as Grriffin Stanton-Ameisen)
- Jared Zirilli as George Washington
- Jeff Adler as Sam Sandwich
- Kontravious Harrell as Cesar Prince
- Karma Prince as Drucilla Prince
- Shawn Nathaniel Wallace as Festus Prince (credited as Shawn Wallace)
- Kevin Jackson as Newport
- Jeff Zinn as Jacob Bayley
- John Rothman as Governor George Clinton
- Claire Curtis-Ward as Frances Brush Buchanan
- Ken Wulf Clark as Thomas Chittenden
- Robert McKay as Ralph Hill
- John Brochu as Mr. Henry
- Katie Harke as Abigail Wells
- Lanier Westmoreland as Sipp Ives
- Jack Bulger as Guilford Judge
- Lucie Green as Mila Locke
- Meliki Hurd as Agrippa Hull
- Michael Kopko as Noah Livingston
- Ronan Murray as Joe Allen
- Samuel Adams as Delegate Samuel Adams
- Desmond Winthrop as Durg Deegler
- Jasper Craven as James Breakenridge (credited as Jasper Clark Craven)
- Annie Ard as Lorraine Allen
- Gordon Clapp as Delegate John Calhoon
- Nicholas Kern as Drake
- Yannis Makridis as Drake
- Brian Behrens as Burrows
- Auriyana Armour as Marianne
- Raven Whyles as Eliza
- Ava Ticotin as Molly Brant
- Brian Pendleton as Ormas Newton
- Tom Carson as Sheriff Ten Eyck
- Nicole Doerges as Bar Maid
- Isabelle Margulies as Bar Maid
