= Connecticut Public Television =

PBS member network

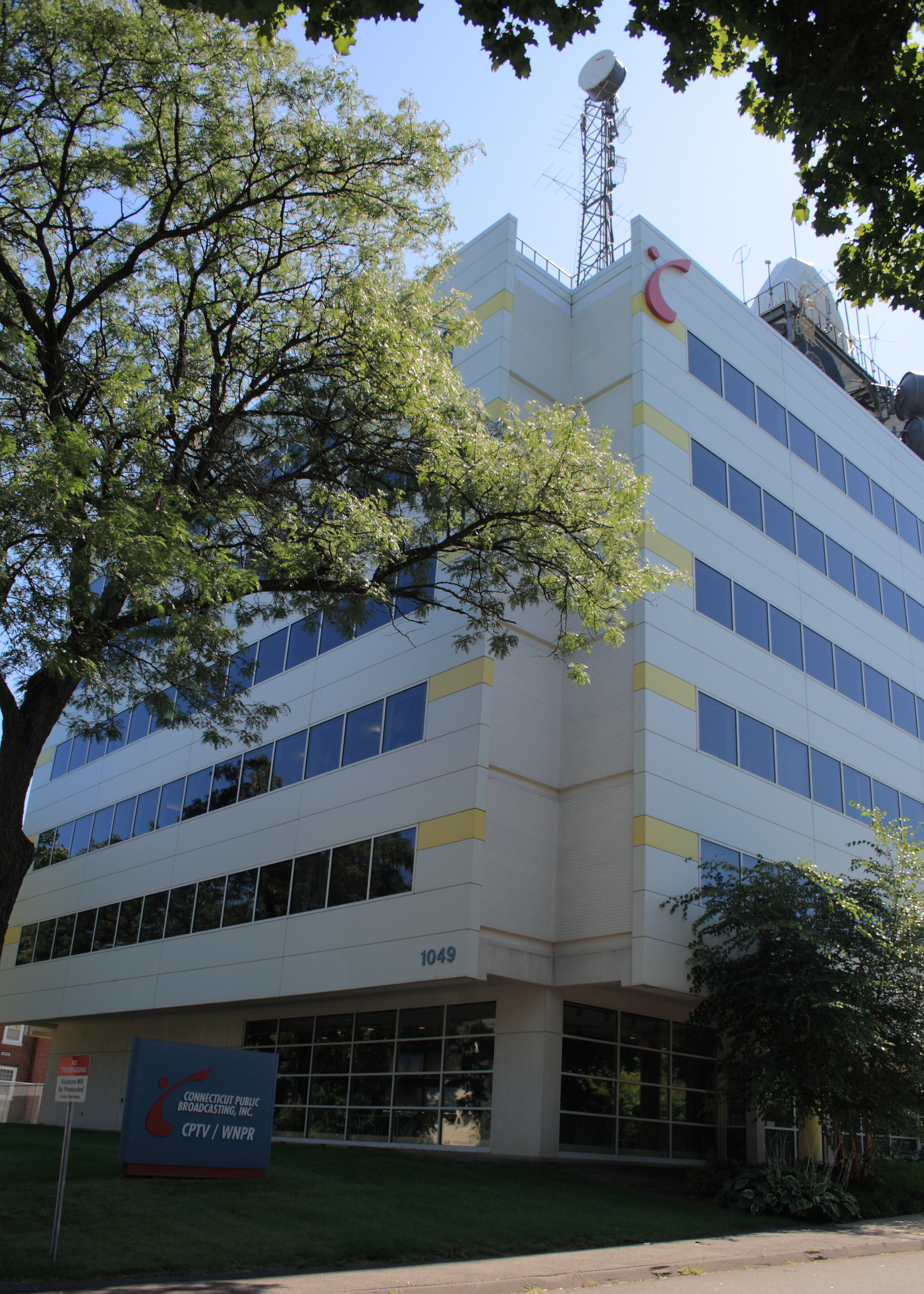
- The studio of CPTV and WNPR in Hartford, Connecticut
- Type: Non-commercial educational broadcast television network
- Country: United States
- First air date: October 1, 1962
- Broadcast area: Statewide Connecticut (additional coverage in Greater New York, Rhode Island, and Western Massachusetts)
- ERP: see § Stations
- Owner: Connecticut Public Broadcasting, Inc.
- Launch date: 1967 (59 years ago)
- Digital channel: see § Stations
- Sister stations: Connecticut Public Radio
- Callsign meaning: Educational Fourth letter: see § Stations
- Affiliation: PBS (1970–present)
- Former affiliations: NET (1962–1970)
- Official website: www.ctpublic.org

Connecticut Public Television (CPTV) is the PBS member network for the U.S. state of Connecticut. It is owned by Connecticut Public Broadcasting, a community-based non-profit organization that holds the licenses for all PBS member stations licensed in the state, and also owns the state's NPR member, Connecticut Public Radio (WNPR). Together, the television and radio stations make up the Connecticut Public Broadcasting Network (CPBN). CPBN is the state's only locally owned media organization producing TV, radio, print and Internet content for distribution across the state. As of 2019, Mark Contreras was announced as the new President / CEO. The organizational structure of CPTV also includes a Board of Trustees. The network co-produced the long-running children's television series, Barney & Friends until the show (alongside other HIT Entertainment programs) were transferred to WNET.

== History ==
The network's first station, WEDH in Hartford, signed on with a black and white signal in 1962, operating from a Trinity College library basement. It was the fourth educational television station in New England, following WGBH-TV in Boston, WENH-TV in Durham, New Hampshire (now part of New Hampshire Public Television), and WCBB in Augusta, Maine (now part of the Maine Public Broadcasting Network). Originally a member of National Educational Television (NET), it joined PBS upon its launch on October 4, 1970. Originally known as Connecticut Educational Television, it became Connecticut Public Television in 1967.

CPTV remained based in rented space at Trinity College until selling its headquarters back to the school for $10 million in 2002. In 2004, CPTV moved to a facility in the Asylum Hill neighborhood of Hartford. The infrastructure of CPTV was eventually upgraded through a partnership with Sony Systems Integration Center (SIC), which enabled the delivery of HD quality telecommunications to subscribers.

In late 2019, CPTV requested to have WEDW's city of license changed from Bridgeport to Stamford.

== Awards ==
Since 1985, CPTV has received the following awards:

=== CPTV ===
- 69 Regional Emmy Awards
- 6 Golden Eagle Awards

=== WNPR ===
- 7 Mark Twain Awards from the Associated Press
- 2 George Foster Peabody Awards
- 2 Gracie Allen Awards
- 2 Ohio State Awards for Broadcast Excellence

== Shows produced by CPTV ==
CPTV was the broadcast and web streaming home of UConn women's basketball from 1994 to 2012. The game broadcasts were the highest-rated locally produced programs in the PBS network.

CPTV is a major producer of children's programming for the PBS network. Its best-known offering was Barney & Friends. The character was discovered in 1991 when CPTV executive Larry Rifkin bought a Barney and the Backyard Gang home video for his daughter and was mesmerized by it. CPTV continued to distribute the show until 2007; it is now distributed by WNET in New York City. Other children's shows originated and/or distributed by CPTV are Thomas & Friends, Bob the Builder, Make Way for Noddy, Angelina Ballerina, and The Saddle Club as well as the first season of SeeMore's Playhouse (the second season was distributed by Oregon Public Broadcasting).

From 1993 to 2005, M*A*S*H star Alan Alda hosted the science series Scientific American Frontiers, based on the popular magazine Scientific American. That show was also produced by CPTV and aired nationwide.

Since 2002, CPTV has been working with HIT Entertainment, which has helped distribute some of CPTV's children's programs. Beginning in 2008, most of CPTV's children's programming (which since 2002 have been produced with HIT Entertainment) has been presented by WNET.

Other programs produced by or for CPTV include:

- Able Lives
- All Things Connecticut
- Behind the Wheel: Parents and Teens
- A Child, A Family, A Future: Foster Care and Adoption in Connecticut
- Closing the Gap
- The Cobblestone Corridor
- Common Ground (formerly known as Conversations on the Green)
- Connecticut on Alert
- Critical Call for Oral Health
- Critical Condition: Focus on Connecticut
- Cutline
- Eating CT
- Facing the Mortgage Crisis
- Fake
- Impact
- Infinity Hall Live
- Landscapes Through Time with David Dunlop
- Mundo Real
- My First Breath
- Off the Menu
- Open Doors to Family Learning
- Opening Doors Opening Minds
- OTR: On The Record
- Positively Connecticut
- Power of Giving
- Scully: The World Show
- Sharing CT
- Sprawl: Driven by Denial
- Today's Children
- The Warming of Connecticut
- Where Art Thou
- WNPR Health Forum
- Work Learn Live
- Young American Heroes

== Stations ==
CPTV's four stations cover almost all of Connecticut, as well as portions of Massachusetts, New York and Rhode Island.

Station	City of license	Channels (VC / RF)	First air date	Fourth letter's meaning	ERP	HAAT	Transmitter coordinates	Facility ID	Public license information
WEDH	Hartford	24; 30 (UHF), shared with WEDY	October 1, 1962	Hartford	497 kW	506 m (1,660 ft)	41°42′13″N 72°49′55″W	13602	Public file LMS
WEDN	Norwich	53; 9 (VHF)	March 5, 1967	Norwich	4.2 kW	192 m (630 ft)	41°31′14″N 72°10′1″W	13607	Public file LMS
WEDW	Stamford	49; 21 (UHF), shared with WZME	December 17, 1967 (in Bridgeport; license moved to Stamford in 2019)	Western Connecticut	DTS1: 200 kW; DTS2: 210 kW	DTS1: 219 m (719 ft); DTS2: 428 m (1,404 ft)	DTS1: 41°16′44.3″N 73°11′6.4″W; DTS2: 40°44′54″N 73°59′9″W	13594	Public file LMS
WEDY	New Haven	65; 30 (UHF), shared with WEDH	December 1, 1974 was W71AG from 1967 until 1974	Yale University	497 kW	506 m (1,660 ft)	41°42′13″N 72°49′55″W	13595	Public file LMS

The network previously operated a translator in Waterbury, W12BH (channel 12), which directly repeated WEDY. That station was taken off the air to allow WTXX (now WCCT-TV) to begin digital television operations. Prior to that it was on Channel 61 as W61AC from 1967 until 1979 due to launch of WXTV translator.

CPTV is available on all cable systems in the state. On satellite, WEDH is available in nearly all of the state on the Hartford–New Haven DirecTV and Dish Network feeds, while WEDW is carried on the New York City DirecTV and Dish Network feeds; Stamford is part of the New York market. WEDW is also available both over-the-air and on several cable systems in portions of Greater New York, including the non-bordering states of New Jersey and Pennsylvania. Additionally, WEDH is carried by most cable systems in the Pioneer Valley of Massachusetts, providing a second choice for PBS programming alongside WGBY-TV in Springfield. Finally, WEDN has wide over-the-air and cable availability in Rhode Island, including Providence (sharing the market with WSBE-TV and Boston's WGBH-TV/WGBX-TV). This gives CPTV a potential audience of 21 million people in six states, including much of Southern New England.

== Technical information ==
=== Subchannels ===
The signals of CPTV's stations are multiplexed:

Subchannels of WEDH and WEDY
Subchannel		Res.	Short name		Programming
WEDH	WEDY	Res.	WEDH	WEDY	Programming
24.1	65.2	1080i	WEDH-1	WEDY-2	PBS
24.2	65.1	1080i	WEDH-2	WEDY-1	PBS Kids

Subchannels of WEDN (ATSC 3.0)
Subchannel	Res.	Short name	Programming
53.1	1080i	WEDN	PBS
53.2	1080i	KIDS	PBS Kids

Subchannels of WEDW and WZME
License	Subchannel	Res.	Short name	Programming
WEDW	49.1	480i	WEDW-1	PBS
WZME	43.1	720p	Story	Story Television
WZME	43.2	480i	MeTV+	MeTV+
WZME	43.3	480i	MeTV	MeTV
WZME	43.4	720p	TOONS	MeTV Toons
WZME	43.12	480i	EMLW	OnTV4U

WEDW is currently broadcasting 480i video on RF channel 21 with CPTV programming (49.1 virtual, 25% of packets). It shares its 6 MHz bandwidth with WZME (43.1 virtual, 720p video, 32% of packets) and MeTV+ programming (43.2 virtual, 480i video, 22% of packets). 21% of transport stream packets are null packets. Subchannels 49.2 and 49.3 are not currently broadcast by WEDW. As of 2023, WEDN currently broadcasts on ATSC 3.0.

=== Analog-to-digital conversion ===
in 2009, leading up to the analog-to-digital television transition on June 12, CPTV shut down the analog transmitters of its stations on a staggered basis. Listed below are the dates each analog transmitter ceased operations as well as their post-transition channel allocations:

- WEDH shut down its analog signal, over UHF channel 24, on June 12, 2009, the official date on which full-power television stations in the United States transitioned from analog to digital broadcasts under federal mandate. The station's digital signal remained on its pre-transition UHF channel 45, using virtual channel 24.
- WEDW shut down its analog signal, over UHF channel 49, on February 17, 2009, the original date on which full-power television stations in the United States were to transition from analog to digital broadcasts under federal mandate (which was later pushed back to June 12, 2009). The station's digital signal relocated from its pre-transition UHF channel 52, which was among the high band UHF channels (52–69) that were removed from broadcasting use as a result of the transition, to its analog-era UHF channel 49.
- WEDN shut down its analog signal, over UHF channel 53, on June 12, 2009. The station's digital signal remained on its pre-transition VHF channel 9, using virtual channel 53.
- WEDY went off the air on July 31, 2005, as the result of equipment failure. Connecticut Public Broadcasting was granted permission by the Federal Communications Commission to temporarily keep the station off the air until repairs were completed. CPBI also petitioned the FCC to allow WEDY's analog signal to remain off the air permanently, citing the need to use available funds on the construction of its digital facilities. The station's digital signal resumed on its pre-transition VHF channel 6 on June 13, 2009, using virtual channel 65. However, most New Haven viewers kept access to PBS programming due to the high penetration of cable and satellite in the area.

On March 16, 2011, the FCC granted WEDY's petition to move from VHF channel 6 to UHF channel 41 because of viewer reception issues and interference from both WPVI-TV in Philadelphia and WRGB in Schenectady, New York (both also operate on channel 6), after those two stations implemented recent power increases.

== CPBN Learning Lab ==
The CPBN Learning Lab's goal is to train journalists and journalism instructors. Presently, the Hartford Public Schools Journalism & Media Academy (JMA) receives full-time access to the facility to enhance media skills.

Since 2007, CPBN Media Lab instructors and mentors have provided real-world technical and journalism training for over 600 Connecticut students through seminars, workshops, and courses. The Media Lab has brought journalism and technical media skills training to middle school students through its Future Producers Academy, "Media is Magic" SAND Media Enrichment Program and West Middle Media Project and for high school students through its Media 101 and Young Entrepreneur courses in its Impact Academy.

Internships are provided to undergraduate college students, often for college credit, and for recent graduates seeking to acquire technical and editorial skills.

Graduates of the CPTV college program have gone on to work in diverse media companies.

The CPBN Media Lab has been a partner with the PBS NewsHour Student Reporting Labs from their inception in 2010, serving as the professional mentor for five Connecticut high schools: Hill Regional Career High School and the Metropolitan Business Academy in New Haven, Crosby High School in Waterbury, Terryville High School in Terryville and Bethel High School in Bethel. It is also the professional mentors to the PBS NewsHour Student Reporting Lab it established at America's Choice at SAND school in Hartford, one of three in the nation to work with middle school students.

Projects produced by the Media lab include:

- Foul Play, a look into the use of metal bats in Little League Baseball
- Youth Vote, which documents the experiences of youth voters in the 2008–2012 elections
- (I)NTERVIEW a behind-the-scenes look into the lives of notable Connecticut celebrities
- Outdoor Enthusiast, a look into Connecticut's state parks and scenic areas, launched alongside the original release of Ken Burns' series for PBS, The National Parks: America's Best Idea.

=== Awards and recognition ===
- The CPBN Media finished strongly in the 2010 Pepsi Refresh competition with a proposal to help Connecticut schools produce 21st-century journalists.
- The CPBN Media Lab won the Connecticut Secretary of State's youth vote video competition in 2012.
- The CPBN Media Lab won two Student Emmy Awards from the Boston New England Chapter of the National Association of Television Arts & Sciences in 2013.
- The CPBN Media Lab received recognition as a finalist in the Student Emmy Award from the Boston New England Chapter of the National Association of Television Arts & Sciences in 2013.

== See also ==
- Public, educational, and government access (PEG)
