= Ethan Frome =

1911 novella by Edith Wharton

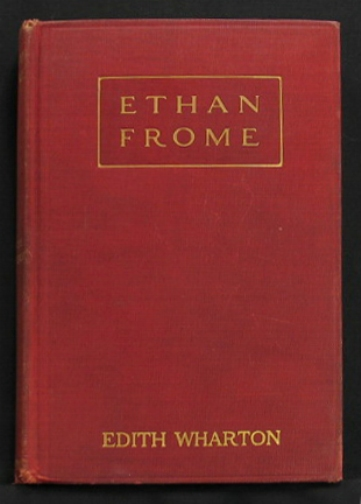
- Author: Edith Wharton
- Language: English
- Publisher: Scribner's
- Publication date: November 6, 1911
- Publication place: United States
- Media type: Print (hardback & paperback)
- Pages: 195 pp
- ISBN: 0-486-26690-7
- Text: Ethan Frome online

Ethan Frome is a 1911 novella by American author Edith Wharton. It details the story of a man who falls in love with his wife's cousin and the tragedies that result from the ensuing love triangle. The novel has been adapted into a film of the same name.

== Plot ==
A nameless male narrator works for a power plant, and due to a carpenters' strike, finds himself forced to spend a winter in the nearby small (fictional) town of Starkfield, Massachusetts. The man who chauffeurs him daily to work is a limping, quiet man named Ethan Frome, a lifelong resident and local fixture of the community. The narrator learns that Frome's limp arose from being injured in an accident. The story then flashes back 24 years to detail Frome's past.

The young Frome is married to a sickly woman named Zeena (Zenobia), who appears older than her age, is unkind to Ethan, and whose life revolves around seeking expensive treatments for her varied illnesses. Although the Fromes have limited means themselves, they have charitably taken in Zeena's cousin Mattie, whose family is poor. Ethan falls in love with Mattie, and it becomes increasingly clear that Mattie returns his affections. While it remains ambiguous if Zeena suspects Ethan's unfaithfulness, she makes plans to send Mattie away. Zeena claims that, because of her failing health, her physician has recommended she hire a maid who will relieve her of housework. Zeena has already arranged for the hired girl to arrive soon by train, and Mattie must leave immediately. Ethan, miserable at the thought of losing Mattie, considers running away with her, but he lacks the money to do so, and will feel guilty about leaving Zeena with the farm.

The next morning, Ethan rushes into town to try to obtain a cash advance from a customer for a load of lumber in order to have the money with which to elope with Mattie. His plan is unhinged by guilt, however, when the customer's wife expresses honest compassion for Ethan. He realizes that he cannot cheat this kindly woman and her husband out of their money.

Ethan comes back to the farm and picks up Mattie to take her to the train station. They stop at a hill upon which they had once planned to go sledding and decide to sled together as a way of delaying their sad parting. After their first run, Mattie suggests a suicide pact: that they go down again, and steer the sled directly into a big elm tree, so they will never be parted and that they may spend their last moments together. The resulting crash leaves both alive but permanently disfigured, Ethan with a permanent limp and Mattie paralyzed from a spinal injury.

Returning to the present, the narrator tells of being forced by a blizzard to stay the night at the Frome house, the first stranger to enter the house in twenty years. He witnesses an unhappy scene with Mattie and the Fromes living together, with Zeena as Mattie's caregiver. Ethan and Mattie have gotten their wish to stay together, but in mutual unhappiness and discontent, and ironically Mattie has now developed an irritable disposition, and the sickly Zeena is rising to the challenge of becoming a caretaker. Zeena is a constant presence between the two, although it remains ambiguous as to whether she knew of their dalliance.

== Development ==
The story of Ethan Frome began as a French-language composition that Wharton had to write while studying the language in Paris, but several years later she took the story up again and transformed it into a novel, basing her sense of New England culture and place on her ten years of living at The Mount, her home in Lenox, Massachusetts. She would read portions of her novel-in-progress each day to her good friend Walter Berry, who was an international lawyer. Wharton likely based the story of Ethan and Mattie's sledding experience on an accident that she had heard about in 1904 in Lenox. Five people total were involved in the real-life accident, four girls and one boy. They crashed into a lamppost while sledding down Courthouse Hill in Lenox. A girl named Emily Hazel Crosby was killed in the accident. Wharton learned of the accident from one of the girls who survived, Kate Spencer, when the two became friends while both worked at the Lenox Library. Kate Spencer suffered from a hip injury in the accident and also had facial injuries. It is among the few works by Wharton with a rural setting. Wharton found the notion of the tragic sledding crash to be irresistible as a potential extended metaphor for the wrongdoings of a secret love affair.

Lenox is also where Wharton had traveled extensively and had come into contact with at least one of the victims of the accident; victims of the accident are buried in graves nearby Wharton family members. In her introduction to the novel, Wharton talks of the "outcropping granite" of New England, the austerity of its land and the stoicism of its people. There are frequent references to larch, elm, pine, and hemlock trees. The connection between land and people is very much a part of naturalism; the environment is a powerful shaper of man's fate, and the novel dwells insistently on the cruelty of Starkfield's winters.

== Reception ==
The New York Times called Ethan Frome "a compelling and haunting story." Wharton was able to write an appealing book and separate it from her other works, where her characters in Ethan Frome are not of the elite upper class. However, the problems that the characters endure are still consistently the same, where the protagonist has to decide whether or not to fulfill their duty or follow their heart. She began writing Ethan Frome in the early 1900s when she was still married. The novel was criticized by Lionel Trilling as lacking in moral or ethical significance. Trilling wrote that the ending is "terrible to contemplate," but that "the mind can do nothing with it, can only endure it."

Jeffrey Lilburn notes that some find "the suffering endured by Wharton's characters is quite bleak and makes for a dull read," but others see the difficult moral questions addressed and note that it "provides insightful commentary on the American economic and cultural realities that produced and allowed such suffering." Wharton was always careful to label Ethan Frome as a brief reminiscence rather than a novel. Critics did take note of this when reviewing the book, some in more candor than others. Elizabeth Ammons reflected that reading Wharton's novel compelled her to reminisce upon when literature was more enthralling. She found a story that functions as a "realistic social criticism," a reminder that some are willing to indulge in dull prose based solely upon the name of the author. Despite her obvious quarrels with the work, Ammons proceeded to analyze the text. The moral concepts, as described by Ammons, are revealed with all of the brutality of Starkfield's winters. Comparing Mattie Silver and Zeena Frome, Ammons suggests that Mattie would grow as frigid and crippled as Zeena, so long as such women remain isolated and dependent. Wharton cripples Mattie, says Lilburn, but has her survive in order to demonstrate the cruelty of the culture surrounding women in that period.

== Adaptations ==
The book was adapted in the 1993 film Ethan Frome, directed by John Madden. It stars Liam Neeson, Patricia Arquette, Joan Allen and Tate Donovan.

Cathy Marston adapted the book to a one-act ballet titled Snowblind for the San Francisco Ballet. The ballet premiered in 2018, with Ulrik Birkkjaer as Ethan, Sarah Van Patten as Zeena and Mathilde Froustey as Mattie.

== In popular culture ==
In David Foster Wallace’s book Infinite Jest, the character Don Gately credits part of his academic decline to difficulty with reading Wharton’s novella, which he misremembers as being named “Ethan From”.
