= The Year That Trembled =

- Directed by: Jay Craven
- Screenplay by: Jay Craven; Hathalee Higgs
- Based on: The Year That Trembled by Scott Lax
- Produced by: Tyler Davidson; Scott Lax
- Starring: Jonathan Brandis; Marin Hinkle; Martin Mull; Meredith Monroe; Fred Willard
- Cinematography: Jeff Barklage; John Foster
- Edited by: Beatrice Sisul
- Music by: Jeff Claus; Judy Hyman
- Production companies: Evans Printing Co. Gamekeepers Taverns, Lodges and Inns; Novel City Pictures
- Distributed by: Kingdom County Productions; Ardustry Home Entertainment
- Release date: March 22, 2002 (Cleveland)
- Running time: 104 minutes
- Country: United States
- Language: English

The Year That Trembled is a 2002 American romantic war drama film directed by Jay Craven and starring Jonathan Brandis, Marin Hinkle, Martin Mull, Meredith Monroe and Fred Willard. It is based on Scott Lax's novel of the same name.

== Cast ==
- Jonathan Brandis as Casey Pedersen
- Meredith Monroe as Judy Woods
- Marin Hinkle as Helen Kerrigan
- Jonathan M. Woodward as Charlie Kerrigan
- Charlie Finn as Jim "Hairball" Morton
- Sean Nelson as Phil Robbins
- Jay R. Ferguson as Isaac Hoskins
- Kiera Chaplin as Jennifer Treman
- Fred Willard as Frank Woods
- Martin Mull as Wayne Simonelli
- Lucas Ford as Johnny Kenston
- Henry Gibson as Ralph Tyler
- Bill Raymond as Ernie Whirly
- Matt Salinger as Professor Jeff Griggs
- Danica McKellar as Pam Hatch
