= Metropolitan Business Academy =

High school in Connecticut, United States

Coordinates: 41.3012°N 72.9188°W

Information
- Enrollment: c.450
- Website: www.metropolitanbusinessacademy.org

Metropolitan Business Academy is an interdistrict magnet high school located on 115 Water Street in New Haven, New Haven County, in Connecticut, United States. It is part of the New Haven Public School District. It enrolls approximately 450 students. It is located near New Haven's Route 1 Highway and Long Island Sound. The school operates with three trimesters, and an alternating block schedule (A day, B day).

Metropolitan offers students four academic paths of study - Allied Health and Science, Digital Arts and Technology, Law and Political Science, and Finance.
