= Where the Rivers Flow North =

- Directed by: Jay Craven
- Written by: Jay Craven; Don Bredes
- Based on: Where the Rivers Flow North by Howard Frank Mosher
- Produced by: Jay Craven; Bess O'Brien
- Starring: Michael J. Fox; Rip Torn; Tantoo Cardinal; Treat Williams
- Cinematography: Paul Ryan
- Edited by: Barbara Tulliver
- Music by: The Horse Flies; Ben Wittman
- Release date: October 1993 (Vancouver)
- Running time: 106 minutes
- Country: United States
- Language: English
- Box office: $595,505

Where the Rivers Flow North is a 1993 American drama film directed by Jay Craven and starring Rip Torn, Tantoo Cardinal, Treat Williams and Michael J. Fox. It is based on Howard Frank Mosher's novel of the same name.

== Plot ==
Log-driver Noel Lord defies power company boss Clayton Farnsworth, who orders Lord and his feisty American Indian mate off their soon-to-be-flooded land.

== Cast ==
- Rip Torn as Noel Lord
- Tantoo Cardinal as Bangor
- Bill Raymond as Ray Quinn
- Michael J. Fox as Clayton Farnsworth
- Mark Margolis as New York Money
- Treat Williams as Champ's Manager
- Amy Wright as Loose Woman

== Reception ==
Leonard Maltin awarded the film two and a half stars.
