= Peter and John =

- Directed by: Jay Craven
- Screenplay by: Jay Craven
- Based on: Pierre and Jean by Guy de Maupassant
- Produced by: Jay Craven; Virginia Joffe
- Starring: Jacqueline Bisset; Christian Coulson
- Cinematography: James Heck
- Edited by: Jay Craven; Josh Melrod
- Music by: Judy Hyman
- Production company: Kingdom County Productions
- Release date: June 27, 2015 (Nantucket)
- Running time: 110 minutes
- Country: United States
- Language: English

Peter and John is a 2015 American drama film written and directed by Jay Craven and starring Jacqueline Bisset and Christian Coulson. It is based on Guy de Maupassant's novel Pierre and Jean.

== Cast ==
- Jacqueline Bisset as Julia Roland
- Christian Coulson as Peter Roland
- Diane Guerrero as Lucia
- Shane Patrick Kearns as John Roland
- Gordon Clapp as Charles Roland
- Gary Farmer as "Smoke"
- Christopher James Baker as Jake Rivers
- Susan Kelechi Watson as Patience

== Production ==
The film was shot in Nantucket.

== Nomination ==
The film was nominated for a 2016 New England Emmy Award.
