= Celebrity sex tape =

Pornographic film of famous people

A celebrity sex tape is typically an amateur pornographic video recording involving one or more famous people which has, intentionally or unintentionally, been made available publicly. Such videos have often been released without the consent of their subjects and have damaged (or enhanced) celebrities' careers. In 1988, for example, a sex tape caused significant damage to Rob Lowe's career.

The surfacing of sex tapes has become so common that some are "leaked" as a marketing tool to advance or establish a media career. A celebrity can fight the release in court to maintain deniability while still enjoying the career benefits. Alternatively, a celebrity may take the route of openly releasing the tape and benefitting directly from royalties as well as indirectly from the publicity. The public acceptance of celebrities with sex tapes is speculated by Joe Levy, executive editor of Rolling Stone, to be due to the easy availability of pornography, as well as couples more commonly making their own tapes due to the prevalence of video cameras.

== Famous celebrity sex tapes ==
The following is an alphabetical list by surname of individuals known to have their sexual acts recorded and distributed:

=== A ===
- Farrah Abraham, the former Teen Mom star, had a pornographic film released by Vivid Entertainment in May 2013 that was marketed as a sex tape. The video featured her having sex with porn star James Deen which she legally sold to Vivid reportedly for $1.5 million. Abraham defended her decision to make the video claiming that she wanted to "celebrate [her] awesome body".
- Pamela Anderson has appeared in two distinct sex tapes.
  - Pamela Anderson and then-husband Tommy Lee had various interludes from their honeymoon placed online by Seth Warshavsky of the Internet Entertainment Group in 1997 as one of the earliest internet celebrity sex tapes.
  - Pamela Anderson and Bret Michaels (singer of the band Poison) had a sex tape released as a DVD on 7 September 2005. The footage had been circulating on the internet for many years.

=== B ===
- Joe Barton, a US Congressman from Texas, came to national attention when nude selfie photos of him and video he had taken of himself masturbating both surfaced online in 2017.
- Wally Bayola An intimate video of this Filipino noontime show host and celebrity, with a dancer of the group "EB Babe" surfaced on YouTube in 2013.
- Chuck Berry, American musician who recorded videos of himself urinating on and engaging in coprophilia with women.

=== C ===
- Chyna – Former professional wrestler Joanie Laurer made her adult film debut with the 2004 video 1 Night in China. Laurer and Sean Waltman approached Red Light District Video to distribute the homemade video. She then appeared in her second video entitled Another Night in China in 2009. In 2011, Chyna starred in her first professional pornographic film for Vivid Video entitled Backdoor to Chyna. She also starred for Vivid as She-Hulk in their parody of The Avengers, released in May 2012. A spinoff feature centered on the She-Hulk character titled She-Hulk XXX was released to video in April 2013.
- Chu Mei-feng had a 47-minute video CD secretly taken with a pinhole camera, released by a local paparazzi magazine in December 2001. The video showed Chu having sex with Tseng Chung-ming, who was later confirmed as a married man. Despite local authorities' immediate effort to pull all the magazines in question from the market, the video quickly spread via the Internet. In January 2002, search engine Lycos reported that her name was among the most searched terms.
- Chua Soi Lek, while serving as Malaysia's Health Minister, was secretly videotaped having sex. Two resulting DVDs were distributed freely and anonymously to various homes in Batu Pahat. On 2 January 2008, Chua announced his resignation, despite saying he would not do so the previous day.
- Daniella Cicarelli is a former Brazilian TV show hostess for MTV Brasil and fashion model. Her sex video was broadcast on the TV show Dolce Vita on Spanish channel Telecinco. It revealed Cicarelli on a beach in Spain fondling her boyfriend, Merrill Lynch employee Renato "Tato" Malzoni, and later having sex with him in the water.
- Tulisa Contostavlos is a British singer/actress and during her time on talent show The X Factor, on which she was a judge, a tape was released that showed her giving oral sex to her ex-boyfriend, rapper Justin Edwards, also known as MC Ultra. She also got her lawyers to take it off the internet and released a YouTube video to put "her side of the story" across to the public.

=== D ===
- Fred Durst, the frontman for the band Limp Bizkit, had a video of him and an unknown woman having sex leaked onto the Internet by a repairman who had been repairing his computer. He later sued the website Gawker and nine others for $70 million for publishing it.
- Artem Dzyuba, Russian professional footballer, had a video depicting him masturbating go viral in 2020. He was subsequently dropped from Russia's Nations League games against Moldova, Turkey, and Serbia.

=== E ===
- David Ellefson, the bassist for the heavy metal band Megadeth, had videos of him masturbating leaked to social media in May 2021. The videos were recorded from 2020 to 2021 by a female 19-year-old Dutch fan he was in correspondence with. Accusations of child grooming were initially levelled against Ellefson, though he and the fan denied these claims and maintained their encounters were consensual. Within days of the videos being leaked, Megadeth fired Ellefson, who vowed to take legal action against the party responsible for the leak.
- Tami Erin, former child star of 1988's The New Adventures of Pippi Longstocking, sold a sex tape of her and an ex-boyfriend in 2013, after determining she could not otherwise prevent its release.

=== F ===
- Jose Figueroa Agosto, better known as Junior Capsula, is a Puerto Rican convicted drug lord who made a sex tape that was later available to the public to buy.
- Amy Fisher, also known as the "Long Island Lolita", was made famous by her shooting and severely wounding her former lover's wife, while Fisher was a teenager. She has marketed a sex tape with her husband.

=== H ===
- Katrina Halili was one of three principals associated with the so-called "Hayden Camera" controversy, in which videos were leaked in May 2009 that revealed sexual encounters between Halili and Dr. Hayden Kho, and which were distributed over the Internet without her consent.
- Tonya Harding and her then-husband Jeff Gillooly had a sex tape that was copied and marketed exclusively by Penthouse. The couple decided to release it legitimately on their own. It was commercially sold by Penthouse Home Video as the "Wedding Night" tape, even though the wedding gown was actually a Halloween costume.
- Chelsea Handler had a tape released that alternates between Handler performing standup comedy and having sex with a man.
- Keeley Hazell, a British glamour model, had a sex tape made with her ex-boyfriend Lloyd Miller published on the Internet in early January 2007.
- Paris Hilton and then-boyfriend Rick Salomon recorded themselves having sex in a hotel room, shot in night vision. Hilton initially attempted to stop the release of the tape and threatened to file a lawsuit, but she now receives profits from the distribution of the video. This footage, along with additional full-color footage, was released commercially under the title 1 Night in Paris.
- Hoàng Thùy Linh, a Vietnamese television star, lost her job on a TV series after a video of the 19-year-old having sex with her boyfriend was released on the Internet.
- Hulk Hogan, professional wrestler, and radio host Bubba the Love Sponge's ex-wife Heather Clem Cole were seen in a grainy video that surfaced early in 2012. Hogan sued Gawker for $100 million for defamation, loss of privacy, and emotional pain due to the release of the tape. He won the lawsuit, and on 18 March 2016, he was awarded $115 million. On 10 June 2016, Gawker announced its bankruptcy filing as a direct result of the monetary judgment against the company.

=== I ===
- Nazril Irham, an Indonesian pop star known as "Ariel" was sentenced to 3 1/2 years in prison in January 2011 for appearing in two sex videos circulating on the internet. TV presenter Luna Maya and soap opera star Cut Tari initially denied being the women in the videos. Under a controversial anti-pornography law that came into effect in Indonesia in 2008, defendants can face up to twelve years in prison, even if the court determines they never intended the videos to be leaked to the public. The video would have resulted in his prosecution under a law banning adultery, owing to Cut Tari having been married at the time the video was made in 2006.

=== K ===
- Kim Kardashian made a sex tape with her then boyfriend Ray J in October 2003. The video—called Kim Kardashian, Superstar—was leaked in 2007. She threatened to take legal action to block its planned distribution by Vivid Video. Her sex tape bolstered her career when E! made her and her family the focus of a reality television show, Keeping Up with the Kardashians.
- R. Kelly's sex tape, produced in 1998 and published in early 2002, showed the singer having sexually abused (and urinating on) a then 14-year-old female. Having denied involvement upon indictment on June 6, 2002, and nearly 14 years after his 2008 acquittal for producing child sexual abuse material, the case was reopened in an August 2022 criminal trial in Chicago, where Kelly was found guilty the following month and was sentenced to 20 years in federal prison.
- Jayne Kennedy, a former sportscaster and blaxploitation actress, had a sex tape stolen and released showing her with former husband Leon Isaac Kennedy.

=== L ===
- John Leslie, former presenter of British television shows Blue Peter and This Morning, made a home video of himself receiving oral sex from his actress/nurse girlfriend Abi Titmuss in 2000. He also filmed Titmuss performing and receiving oral sex with another woman.
- Will Levis, quarterback for the Tennessee Titans, faced controversy after a sex tape of him and his girlfriend Gia Duddy was leaked online in 2024.
- Nikko London and Mimi Faust of VH1's reality show Love & Hip Hop: Atlanta have a sex tape, which leaked in April 2014.
- Rob Lowe faced controversy in the 1980s when he taped himself having sex with a young woman and a teenage girl he met at an Atlanta night club. After the tape was released, Lowe's career rebounded, with the actor spoofing the tapes during an appearance on Saturday Night Live.
- Joakim Lundell, a Swedish YouTuber, musician and film director, released (alleged by him to be accidental) a sex tape with fellow YouTuber and future wife Jonna Lundell, in 2013.
- Jenna Lewis, star of Survivor during honeymoon with ex-husband Travis Wolfe on 23 July 2004.

=== M ===
- A pornographic video tape of Mindy McCready and an ex-boyfriend referred to as "Peter" went on sale by Vivid Entertainment on 19 April 2010. McCready claimed the video was stolen from her home three years prior.
- Carolyn Murphy's ex-husband Jake Schroeder allegedly tried to sell a tape featuring them having sex during their honeymoon in 1999 while in Barbados. In January 2006, Schroeder was arrested and charged with extortion for trying to sell the tape. The video was leaked onto the Internet in April 2006.
- A sex tape of Meera, a Pakistani film actress, was released on internet in 2014. In video Meera was shown having sex with her husband Captain Naveed.
- A sex tape of Spanish rapper Morad with his ex-girlfriend was leaked in March 2025.

=== N ===
- Nicole Narain and Colin Farrell have a 13-minute sex tape, recorded in 2003. Farrell confirmed the existence of the tape and obtained a court order blocking its distribution, but copies of the tape nevertheless appeared on the internet in January 2006.
- Vince Neil made a sex tape in 1993 with porn star Janine Lindemulder and actress/former Penthouse Pet Brandy Ledford (who was mosaically-obscured) which was leaked and eventually released by the same company that distributed the by-then infamous sex video made by Pamela Anderson and Tommy Lee.
- Nelly apologized after the accidental posting of a video to his Instagram in February 2022 of him receiving oral sex from an unidentified woman.
- Noelia In June 2007, a sex tape of Puerto Rican singer Noelia and her former boyfriend started circulating on the Internet.
- Thien Thanh Thi Nguyen, best known as Tila Tequila. Two sex tapes featuring Tequila were rumoured to exist as early as 2010. In 2011, Vivid Entertainment released a video of Tequila engaging in sexual acts with pornographic actresses Kristina Rose and Charlie Laine. Tequila stated that the video was made for personal use and she did not consent to its release. In December 2013, another sex-tape was announced, this time of Tequila and "an ex-boyfriend." It was released as a Vivid Video download in mid January 2014.

=== P ===
- Carrie Prejean, American model and author, had a sex tape stolen and released showing her alone.

=== R ===
- Isaiah Rashad, American rapper, has a sex tape which sparked discussion online about his sexuality after it was leaked. It featured him engaging in oral sex with different men. In an interview with rapper and media personality Joe Budden in May 2022, Rashad revealed that he identifies as sexually fluid and addressed the leaks, saying that he was "super in [his] head" when he learned of the leak.

=== S ===
- Karissa Shannon, Playboy Playmate and glamour model, attracted some publicity by confirming in 2010 that she had been involved in sex tapes with Spencer Pratt and Heidi Montag. One sex tape of her and boyfriend actor Sam Jones III was released on DVD by Vivid Entertainment in October 2010 as Karissa Shannon Superstar.
- Shannon Sharpe, former football player, accidentally created a sex tape by inadvertently livestreaming audio of himself and an unidentified woman having intercourse on Instagram. He later apologized and admitted that the livestream had been started accidentally.
- In 2008, a video on the Internet surfaced which purported to be Gene Simmons engaging in sexual activity with an unnamed woman. Simmons later stated that the tape was recorded without his consent or knowledge and that his legal team was pursuing legal options including copyright infringement.
- Saraya Bevis, private photos and sex tape featuring professional wrestler Saraya were leaked online in March 2017.
- Scott Stapp, Grammy award-winning lead singer of Creed, achieved much notoriety in 2006 for a 1999 sex tape featuring Stapp and fellow musician Kid Rock receiving oral sex from groupies in a tour bus. While many previews of the tape had been posted online at the time, the release of the full tape was blocked following a lawsuit by Kid Rock to block the release of the sex tape. These previews notoriously featured a video clip of Stapp uttering the phrase "It's good to be king," a fact verified by Stapp himself.
- Courtney Stodden, reality show contestant, attracted controversy over a sex tape featuring them performing oral sex on their significantly older husband, Doug Hutchison, as well as another solo video. The video was released through Vivid Entertainment. According to Vivid, it is the most successful "self-pleasure video", with $1.2 million netted after 24 hours. Stodden has stated that they intend to donate their $1 million payout to charity.

=== T ===
- On 25 June 2008, a private home video leaked of Verne Troyer and his former live-in girlfriend, Ranae Shrider, having sex. The video, filmed in 2008 in Beverly Hills, California, and Shrider's hometown of Fort Cobb, Oklahoma, was leaked to the public by Shrider and TMZ. Kevin Blatt, the man responsible for brokering the deal for Paris Hilton's sex tape in 2003, tried to sell the video. Troyer, through his long-time attorney, Ed McPherson, sued TMZ, Blatt, and online rental company SugarDVD, for invasion of privacy and copyright infringement.

=== V ===
- Vivian Velez: In the 1980s, a betamax-based celebrity sex tape of this Filipina celebrity/actress supposedly with political personality Rodolfo Fariñas circulated.
- Severina Vučković: In 2004, the Croatian singer was involved in an internationally reported sex scandal after a video featuring her and Bosnian Croat businessman Milan Lučić leaked onto the Internet, which was reported by the Croatian online tabloid Index.hr. Vučković had earlier opposed premarital sex in her public appearances and was claimed to be a practicing Roman Catholic. Vučković sued the website that released the tape for damages, claiming that the video was stolen from her and that it was her intellectual property, but her lawsuit was later dismissed by a Zagreb district court in July 2004.

=== W ===
- Jasmine Waltz appeared in a sex tape released on the Internet. Waltz said she was unaware that the video, made with an unnamed boyfriend and titled "Hollywood It Girl", had been leaked: "I'm absolutely shocked that the public is now going to see what I made with my boyfriend on Valentine's Day".
- Kendra Wilkinson, from Playboy's The Girls Next Door, had an unauthorized sex tape released by Vivid in May 2010. She tried to block the release of the film, but it soon reached the Internet. The video was filmed in 2003 when she was 18 and before she had breast implants.

== See also ==
- Imagery of nude celebrities
