= Illegal Aliens (film) =

- Release poster
- Directed by: David Giancola
- Written by: Ben Coello
- Produced by: Mary Beth French; Zorinah Juan; Anna Nicole Smith; Daniel Smith
- Starring: Anna Nicole Smith; Joanie Laurer
- Cinematography: George Lyon
- Edited by: Nathan Beaman; Justin Bunnell
- Distributed by: MTI Home Video
- Release date: May 1, 2007
- Running time: 96 minutes
- Language: English

Illegal Aliens is a 2007 sci-fi/comedy B-movie starring Anna Nicole Smith and former professional wrestler Joanie Laurer. It was Smith's final film. The film received negative reviews at the time of its release.

== Plot ==
Guided by a holographic mentor, three aliens take the form of beautiful American women in order to stop an intergalactic terrorist (Joanie Laurer), from destroying Earth.

== Cast ==
- Anna Nicole Smith - Lucy
- Joanie Laurer - Rex
- Lenise Soren - Cameron
- Gladys Jimenez - Drew
- Patrick Burleigh - Max Sperling
- Dennis Lemoine - Ray
- Mark 'Woody' Keppel - Vinnie
- Michael J. Valentine - Valentine
- John James - Big Tony

== Documentary ==
Director Giancola later released the self-narrated documentary Addicted to Fame (originally titled Craptastic) about the making of the film. Composed from extensive behind-the-scenes footage, the documentary captures his struggle to complete and release the film in the long shadow of the life, times, troubles and death, of the film's star and producer, Anna Nicole Smith.

== Production Information ==
- Mary Beth French - producer
- David Giancola - director, executive producer
- John James - executive producer
- Zorinah Juan - producer
- Kevin Rapf - producer
- Anna Nicole Smith - producer
- Daniel Smith - associate producer
- Edgewood Studios - production company
- Jessica Oulton - makeup
