= John James (actor) =

American actor and producer (born 1956)

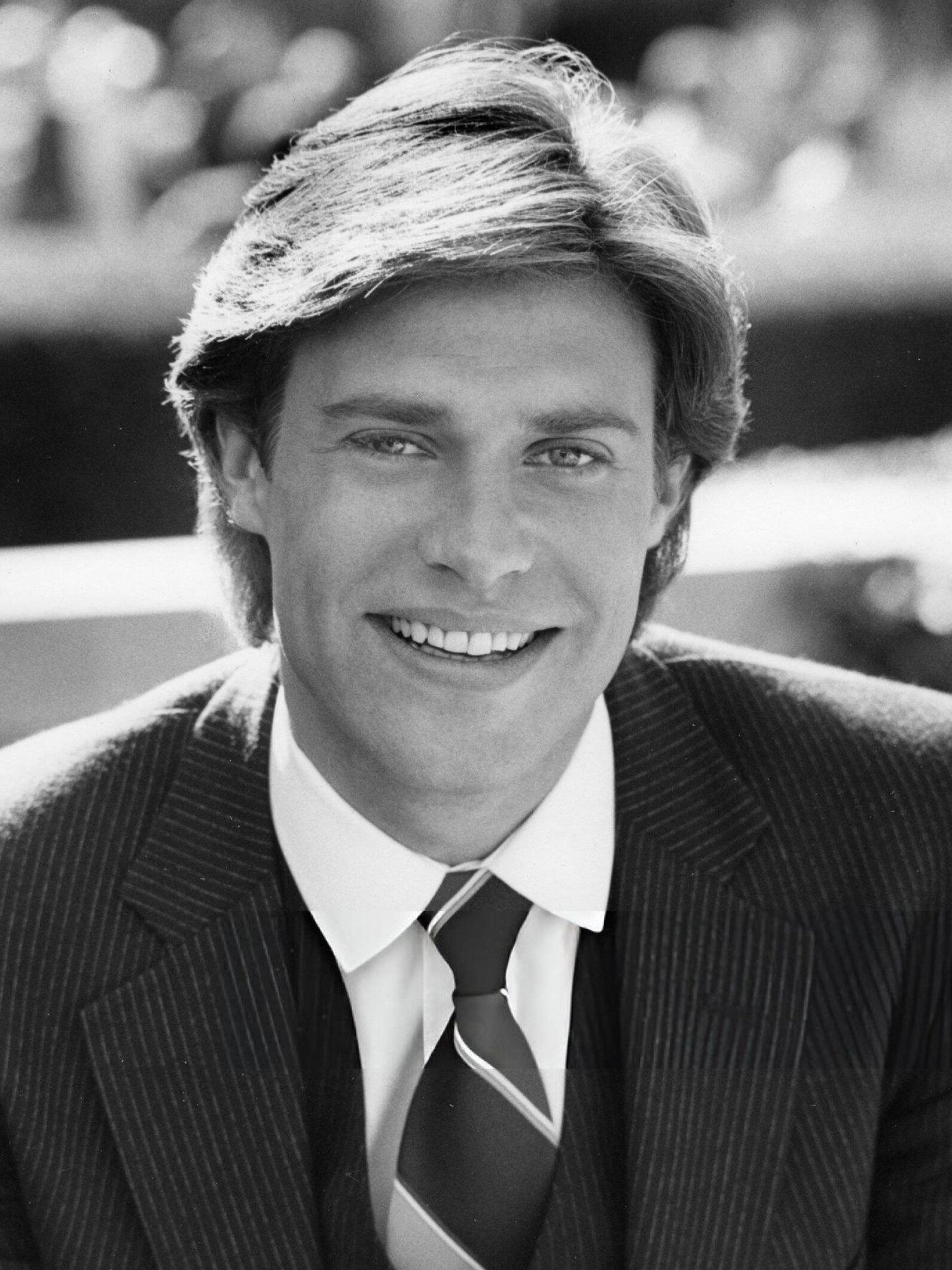
- James, c. 1981
- Born: John James Anderson; April 18, 1956 (age 69); Minneapolis, Minnesota, U.S.
- Occupations: Actor, producer
- Years active: 1977–present
- Spouse: Denise Coward (m. 1989)
- Children: 2; including Laura

John James Anderson (born April 18, 1956) is an American actor and producer widely known to television audiences for his roles as Jeff Colby in both the prime-time soap opera Dynasty and its spin-off series The Colbys throughout the 1980s.

== Career ==
James is a veteran of daytime soaps, first appearing in Search for Tomorrow in the late 1970s. In 1981, he won the role of Jeff Colby in Dynasty, appearing in the first episode, "Oil", and remaining on the prime time soap opera until the final episode, Catch 22 in 1989. James played the same role in The Colbys between 1985 and 1987, and one last time in the 1991 TV movie, Dynasty: The Reunion.

James was nominated for a Golden Globe Award for his role in Dynasty in 1985 and appeared at the 1986 ceremony. The Golden Globe Award for Best Supporting Actor – Series, Miniseries or Television Film went to Edward James Olmos.

James returned to the genre playing Rick Decker on As the World Turns in 2003–2004. In May 2006, he was cast in the role of Dr. Jeff Martin (the first husband of Erica Kane played by series star Susan Lucci) on the ABC daytime soap opera All My Children. He began appearing the following month. On July 15, 2008, James returned to As the World Turns, reprising the role of demented Dr. Rick Decker.

In film, James starred in Icebreaker (2000) with Sean Astin, Bruce Campbell, and Stacy Keach; in The Cursed aka Peril (2001) with Morgan Fairchild and Michael Pare; in Lightning: Fire from the Sky (2001) with Jesse Eisenberg, Stacy Keach and John Schneider and in Chronology (2015) with William Baldwin and Danny Trejo, all of which were directed by David Giancola.

He produced and starred in Illegal Aliens (2007). In 2012, James starred in the Giancola documentary, Addicted to Fame (2012), about the making of their film Illegal Aliens. In 2016, James produced and starred in another Giancola film — the sci-fi action adventure, Axcellerator which reunited him with The Colbys co-star Maxwell Caulfield while James' daughter Laura played one of the roles.

James has appeared on stage intermittently, from musicals for the producer John Kenley to a 1996 national tour of Dial 'M' for Murder with Roddy McDowall, to playing Captain Keller in Judson Theatre Company's The Miracle Worker in 2018.

== Personal life ==
James was born in Minneapolis, Minnesota, as one of the three children of radio broadcaster Herb Oscar Anderson (1928—2017) and his first wife. His brother, Herb Oscar Anderson II, is an actor.

In 1989, James married Denise Ellen Coward (born 1955 in Australia), a model and 2nd Runner-up for Miss World 1978. They have two children. In 2012, James' daughter, Laura, won America's Next Top Model, Cycle 19. His son Phillip is serving in the United States Air Force.

In 2014, James considered running as a Republican for New York's 21st congressional district.

== Filmography ==
Year	Title	Role	Notes
2025	The Legend of Van Dorn	Mayor Haines	Historical drama; Cannes 2025 screening
2022	My Son Hunter	Joe Biden	
2020	The ObamaGate Movie	James Comey	Online release
2020	Axcellerator	Sy	
2018	Christmas Camp	Ben	
2016	Chronology	Tom	aka The Lost Day
2012	Addicted to Fame	Himself	Documentary; Biography
2003–2004, 2008	As the World Turns	Rick Decker	14 episodes
2007	Illegal Aliens	Big Tony	Producer
2006–2007	All My Children	Jeff Martin	32 episodes
2001	Lightning: Fire from the Sky	Porter Randall	TV movie
2001	The Cursed	Scott	aka Peril
2000	Icebreaker	Will Langley	
2000	Pacific Blue	S.N.A.F.U.	1 Episode
1998	Love Boat: The Next Wave	Ray Kennedy	1 Episode
1998	Touched by an Angel	Sam Carver	1 Episode
1992	Partners 'n Love	Carey Mays	TV movie
1991	Dynasty: The Reunion	Jeff Colby	TV movie
1991	Perry Mason: The Case of the Ruthless Reporter	Brett Huston	TV movie
1987	Haunted by Her Past	Eric Beckett	TV movie
1985–1987	The Colbys	Jeff Colby	49 episodes
1984	He's Not Your Son	Ted Barnes	TV movie
1984	Finder of Lost Loves	Father Michael Bretton	1 Episode
1982	The Love Boat	Di Nardi / Enzo Carducci	4 episodes
1982	Fantasy Island	Corky Daniels	1 Episode
1981–1989	Dynasty	Jeff Colby	168 episodes; Golden Globe Award nomination
1977	Search for Tomorrow	Tom 'Junior' Bergman	4 episodes

== Self ==
- The Home and Family Show - Dynasty Reunion (2015)
- America's Next Top Model - Laura's Father (2012)
- The Life and Death of Anna Nicole Smith (2007)
- Intimate Portrait - Emma Samms (2002)
- After They Were Famous - Dynasty (2002)
- E! True Hollywood Story - Dynasty (2001)
- Denver-Clan ohne Maske (1994)
- The Joan Rivers Show - November, 4 (1991)
- Live! with Kelly and Michael - October 18, (1991)
- Entertainment Tonight November, 11 (1987)
- Macy's Thanksgiving Day Parade TV Special (1986)
- The 12th Annual People's Choice Awards (1986)
- The 43rd Annual Golden Globe Awards (1986)
- The 11th Annual People's Choice Awards (1985)
- Christmas with the Carringtons BBC TV Special (1985)
- Breakaway TV Series (1984)
- Battle of the Network Stars XVI - ABC Team Captain (1984)
- The 10th Annual People's Choice Awards (1984)
- Battle of the Network Stars XIV - ABC Team Captain (1983)
- The Merv Griffin Show - February 12 (1983)
- The Merv Griffin Show - November 6 (1982)
- Miss USA 1982 - Celebrity Judge (1982)
- Battle of the Network Stars XIII - ABC Team (1982)
- Battle of the Network Stars XII - ABC Team (1982)

== Awards ==
Year	Award	Work	Result
1983	Bravo Otto Award for Favourite TV star: Male	Dynasty	Won
1984	Bravo Otto Award for Favourite TV star: Male	Dynasty	2nd place
1985	Golden Globe Award for Best Supporting Actor – Series, Miniseries or Television Film	Dynasty	Nominated
1986	Soap Opera Digest Award for Favourite Super Couple on a Primetime Special	The Colbys	Nominated
1988	Soap Opera Digest Award for Favourite Super Couple on a Primetime Special	The Colbys	Nominated

== Discography ==
- This Time b/w Fooling Around (with Heidi Bruhl; 1984)
- Painted Dreams b/w Sleeping In Your Arms Again (1985) (GER # 60, 5 weeks)
