= Welcome to Sweden =

Welcome to Sweden may refer to:

- Welcome to Sweden (2007 TV series), a reality show with Richard Kiel and Verne Troyer on Kanal 5
- Welcome to Sweden (2014 TV series), a sitcom with Greg Poehler and Josephine Bornebusch on TV4 in Sweden and NBC in the U.S.
- Welcome to Sweden, a 2020 album by Swedish rapper Einár
