= Verne Troyer =

American actor (1969–2018)

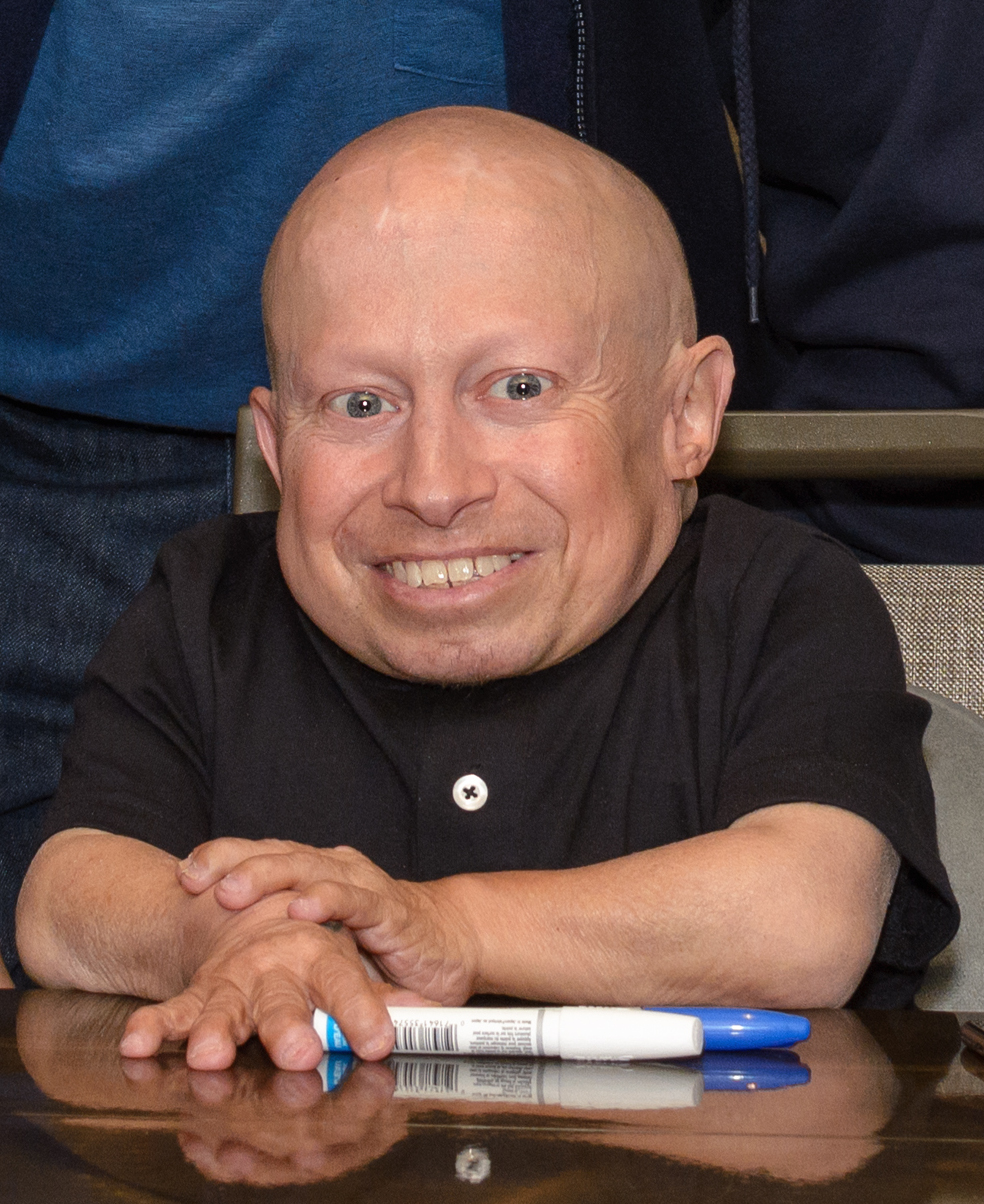
- Troyer at the Chiller Theatre Expo in 2017
- Born: Verne Jay Troyer; January 1, 1969; Sturgis, Michigan, U.S.
- Died: April 21, 2018 (aged 49); Los Angeles, California, U.S.
- Resting place: Leonidas Cemetery
- Occupations: Actor; comedian; stunt performer
- Years active: 1994–2018
- Height: 2 ft 8 in (81 cm)
- Spouse: Genevieve Gallen (m. 2004; ann. 2004)
- Partner: Brittney Powell (2007–2018; his death)

Verne Jay Troyer (January 1, 1969 – April 21, 2018) was an American actor, comedian and occasional stunt coordinator and performer. He was best known for playing Mini-Me in the Austin Powers film series. He had cartilage–hair hypoplasia and was 2 ft 8 in (81 cm) tall.

== Early life ==
Troyer was born in Sturgis, Michigan, on January 1, 1969, the son of Susan, a factory worker, and Reuben Troyer, a repair technician. He had two siblings, Davon and Deborah. He stated that his parents "never treated me any different than my other average-sized siblings. I used to have to carry wood, feed the cows and pigs and farm animals." Troyer was initially raised Amish, but his parents left the faith when he was a child. During his childhood, Troyer spent much time visiting Amish relatives in Centreville, Michigan. He graduated in 1987 from Centreville High School, where a plaque was dedicated to him in 2003.

== Career ==
Troyer's film career began when a former president of Little People of America contacted him, looking for someone to serve as a stunt double for the infant character "Baby Bink" in John Hughes' film Baby's Day Out (1994). He gained further work as a stunt double with minor comedic roles in several films of the 1990s, including Dunston Checks In, Jingle All the Way (both 1996), Men in Black (1997), and My Giant (1998). He is also known for an appearance in an Apple PowerBook G4 advertisement.

Troyer first met with Jay Roach to discuss portraying Mini-Me in the Austin Powers series, directed by Roach and starring co-creator Mike Myers, before filming for the series' second film began. Myers was impressed with Troyer's performance, rewriting the script for Austin Powers: The Spy Who Shagged Me (1999) to give Mini-Me more screen time and remove the character's death. Troyer reprised the role three years later in Austin Powers in Goldmember (2002), and collaborated again with Myers on The Love Guru (2008).

After reaching a large audience as Mini-Me, Troyer portrayed Griphook in Harry Potter and the Sorcerer's Stone (2001), and Percy in Terry Gilliam's fantasy film The Imaginarium of Doctor Parnassus (2009). He also made several appearances as himself in reality television series, including The Surreal Life (2005), Welcome to Sweden (2007), and the British Celebrity Big Brother 6 (2009), in which he placed fourth.

== Personal life ==
On June 25, 2008, a private home video was leaked of Troyer and his former live-in girlfriend Ranae Shrider having sex. The video, recorded in 2008 in Beverly Hills, California, and Shrider's hometown of Fort Cobb, Oklahoma, was leaked to the public by Shrider and TMZ. Kevin Blatt, who previously brokered the deal for Paris Hilton's sex tape in 2003, tried to sell the video. Troyer sued TMZ, Blatt, and online rental company SugarDVD, for invasion of privacy and copyright infringement. The case was settled outside of court. At the time of his death, Troyer was dating actress Brittney Powell, as well as living with her and her son from a previous marriage.

== Death ==
In early April 2018, Troyer was admitted to a hospital after an incident in his home. He had previously been admitted to rehab to undergo treatment for alcoholism.

Troyer died at a Los Angeles hospital on April 21, 2018, at age 49. His death was later ruled a suspected suicide by alcohol intoxication. He was interred in Leonidas Cemetery in St. Joseph County, Michigan.

== Filmography ==
Year	Title	Role	Notes	Ref(s)
1994	Baby's Day Out	Baby Bink's stunt double	Debut role	
1996	Dunston Checks In			
1996	Jingle All the Way	Little Santa Claus		
1996	Pinocchio's Revenge	Pinocchio's Miniature Double		
1997	Volcano			
1997	Men in Black	Alien Son		
1997	Wishmaster	Creature Stage #1		
1997	RocketMan			
1998	My Giant	Wrestler		
1998	Fear and Loathing in Las Vegas	Wee Waiter	Credited as Verne J. Troya	
1998	The Wacky Adventures of Ronald McDonald	Sundae	Direct-to-video; Voice by Dee Bradley Baker	
1998	Mighty Joe Young	Baby Joe		
1999	Here Lies Lonely	Virgil		
1999	Instinct	Gorilla Performer		
1999	Austin Powers: The Spy Who Shagged Me	Mini-Me	Credited as Verne J. Troya	
2000	Bit Players	Marty Rosenthal		
2000	How the Grinch Stole Christmas	Band Member		
2001	Bubble Boy	Dr. Phreak		
2001	Harry Potter and the Sorcerer's Stone	Griphook	Voice by Warwick Davis	
2002	Run for the Money	Attila		
2002	Austin Powers in Goldmember	Mini-Me		
2003	Pauly Shore Is Dead	Himself		
2007	Postal	Himself		
2008	The Love Guru	Coach Punch Cherkov		
2008	College	Himself		
2009	The Imaginarium of Doctor Parnassus	Percy		
2012	Keith Lemon: The Film	Archimedes		
2013	Convenience	Dwight		
2015	Trailer Park Boys: Drunk, High, and Unemployed: Live in Austin	Himself		
2015	Gnome Alone	The Gnome		
2018	The Delivery	The Boss	Short film Posthumous release	
2019	Aliens, Clowns & Geeks	Emperor Beezel-Chugg	Posthumous release	
2020	The 420 Movie: Mary & Jane	Tito the Terrible	Posthumous release Final film role	

=== Television ===
Year(s)	Title	Role	Notes	Ref(s)
1995–1996	Saban's Masked Rider	Ferbus	Suit Actor	
1999–2000	Shasta McNasty	Verne		
2000	Jack of All Trades	Napoleon Bonaparte		
2002	Sabrina the Teenage Witch	Angus		
2003	Boston Public	Taylor Prentice	2 episodes	
2003	Scrubs	Small Man at Bar	Episode: "My Drama Queen"	
2004	Karroll's Christmas	Spike		
2005	The Girls Next Door	Himself	Episode "Fight Night"	
2005	The Surreal Life	Himself		
2005	Half & Half	Reggie	Episode: "The Big Thorne in My Side Episode"	
2006	Bo! in the USA			
2007	The Surreal Life: Fame Games	Himself		
2007	Welcome to Sweden	Himself		
2008	The Smoking Gun Presents: World's Dumbest...	Commentator		
2008	The Podge and Rodge Show	Himself		
2008–2015	Celebrity Juice	Himself		
2009	Celebrity Big Brother	Himself		
2009	Friday Night with Jonathan Ross	Himself		
2009	The Paul O'Grady Show	Himself		
2009	WWE Raw	Guest host		
2013	Lemon La Vida Loca	Himself		
2013	The Body Shocking Show	Himself		
2013	Legit	Himself		
2014	BGO.com TV Campaign			
2014	Whose Line Is It Anyway?	Himself	Season 10, episode 3	
2014	Through the Keyhole	Himself		
2015	Celebrity Wife Swap	Himself		
2017	Trailer Park Boys: Out of the Park: USA	Himself	Episode: "Los Angeles 2"	

=== Music videos ===
Year	Artist	Song	Album
1999	Madonna	"Beautiful Stranger"	Austin Powers: The Spy Who Shagged Me
1999	Mel B	"Word Up"	Austin Powers: The Spy Who Shagged Me
2000	Limp Bizkit	"My Generation"	Chocolate Starfish and the Hot Dog Flavored Water
2002	Moby	"We Are All Made of Stars"	18
2004	D12	"My Band"	D12 World
2005	Ludacris	"Number One Spot"	The Red Light District
2009	Forever the Sickest Kids	"What Do You Want from Me"	The Weekend: Friday and Diary of a Wimpy Kid
2014	Steve Aoki featuring will.i.am	"Born to Get Wild"	Neon Future I

=== Video games ===
Year	Title	Voice role	Ref(s)
2016	Let It Die	Jackal X	

=== Web ===
Year	Title	Role	Notes
2013	Story Cops with Verne Troyer	Glenn Peck	Funny or Die exclusive
2018	My 90-Year-Old Roommate	Verne Troyer	Episode: "Verne Troyer"; posthumous release
