= Time Chasers =

- Promotional poster for Time Chasers
- Directed by: David Giancola
- Written by: David Giancola
- Produced by: Peter Beckwith
- Starring: Matthew Bruch; Bonnie Pritchard; Peter Harrington; George Woodard
- Cinematography: Mark Sasahara
- Edited by: Ace Giancola; Andrew Wilson
- Music by: Alice Damon Kinzie; Bill Kinzie
- Release date: March 17, 1994
- Running time: 89 min
- Country: United States
- Language: English
- Budget: $150,000 (approx)

Time Chasers (originally released as Tangents) is a 1994 science fiction film directed by David Giancola and starring Matthew Bruch, George Woodard, and Bonnie Pritchard. The film premiered in Rutland, Vermont on March 16, 1994, to three invitation-only showings, and in open release in Rutland theatres the next day. The film follows the adventures of an amateur inventor who goes through time with his female accomplice to stop an evil megacorporation intent on changing history for profit. The film was lampooned on Mystery Science Theater 3000 in 1997, and by Rifftrax in a live event broadcast on May 5, 2016.

== Plot ==
Physics teacher and amateur pilot Nick Miller (Matthew Bruch) has finally completed his quest of enabling time travel, via a Commodore 64 and his small airplane. After being inspired by a television commercial for GenCorp, he uses a ruse to bring out both a GenCorp executive and a reporter from a local paper. To Nick's surprise, the reporter is Lisa Hansen (Bonnie Pritchard), an old high school flame. One trip to 2041 later and Gencorp's executive, Matthew Paul (Peter Harrington), quickly arranges Nick a meeting with CEO J.K. Robertson (George Woodard). Impressed by the potential of time travel, Robertson offers Nick a licensing agreement on the technology.

The following week, Nick and Lisa meet at the supermarket and go on a date to the 1950s. However, another trip to 2041 reveals that GenCorp abused Nick's time travel technology, creating a dystopian future. In an attempt to tell J.K. about how GenCorp inadvertently ruined the future. J.K. dismisses the eventuality, and states that there's enough time to worry about how to fix it before it happens. J.K. sees Nick as a threat to GenCorp, and due to the association with the U.S. Government, considers Nick's actions as treason. Nick and Lisa escape GenCorp and spend the remainder of the film trying to reverse the damage to the future. When J.K. finds out about this, he and Matt try to shoot down Nick's plane, killing Lisa in the process while Nick jumps out before the plane crashes. This ultimately culminates in a fight in 1777 during the American Revolution, the deaths of the present Nick and Robertson, and the destruction of the time machine before the original demo, thus ensuring that the majority of the film's events never happen in the first place. The film ends with the now current Nick (now aware of the danger of his time machine) sabotaging his demonstration, and doing a pitch of how an elderly skydiver would be a better ad campaign for J.K.'s company. Furious about being misled, J.K. fires Matt. Nick deletes the data that makes time travel possible. At the end of the film, Nick talks to Lisa in the supermarket as he did in the previous timeline.

== Cast ==
- Matthew Bruch as Nick Miller
- Bonnie Pritchard as Lisa Henson
- Peter Harrington as Matthew Paul
- George Woodard as J.K. Robertson
- Jason Smiley as Future Inhabitant
- Cyrus Rodgers as Future Inhabitant

== Production ==
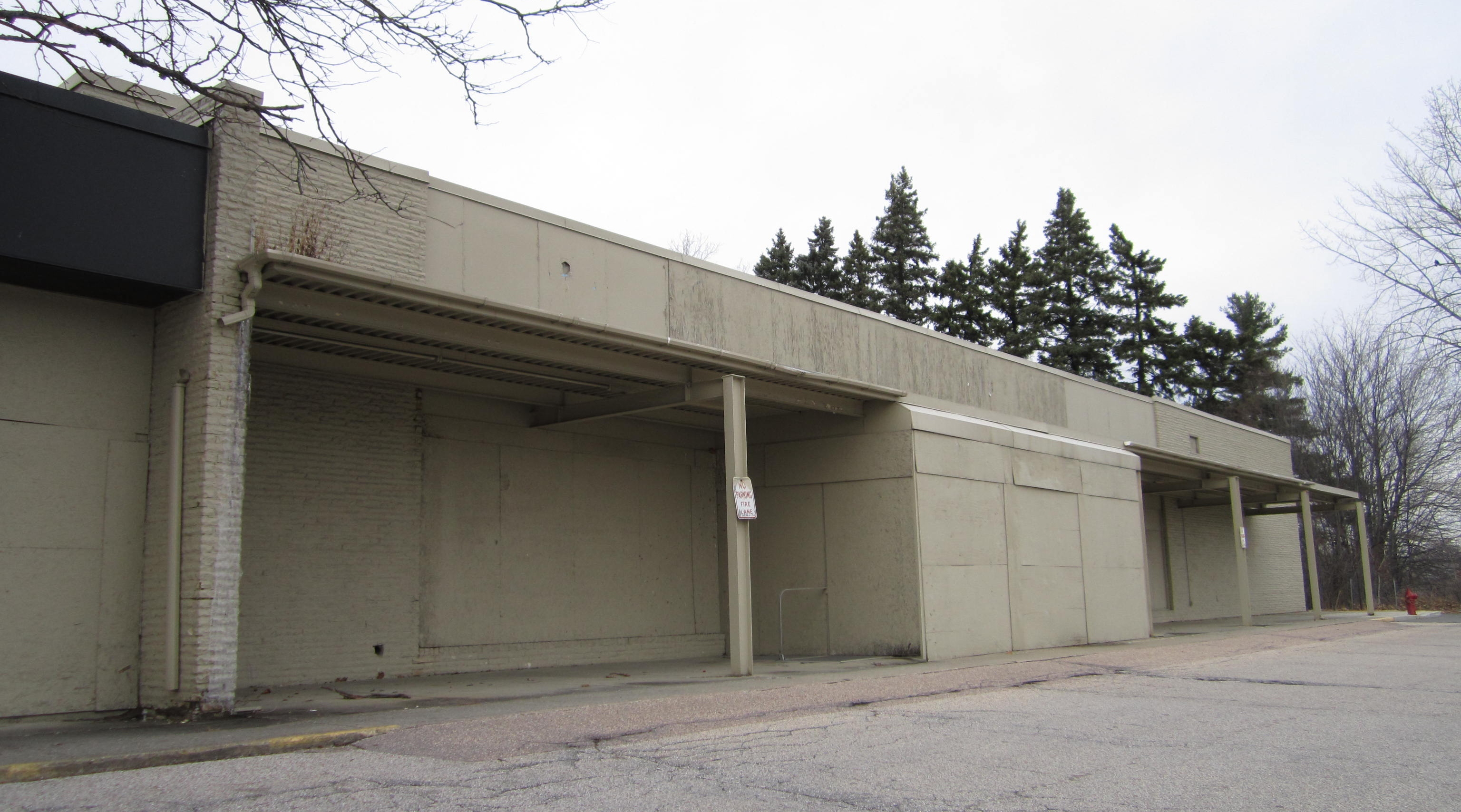
Scenes from Time Chasers were shot at Martin's Foods in South Burlington, Vermont.

Time Chasers was written and directed by David Giancola, under the title Tangents. It was promoted as the first feature film directed, written, and produced in Vermont.

The production was shot in the Rutland, Vermont area during the summer of 1990, though it has a distinctive assortment of mid-1980s cultural artifacts, sets, and props. It was made on a $150,000 budget by 24 year old director David Giancola and his company Edgewood Studios.

Scenes of the dystopic future were filmed at the Howe Center which Giancola's family was then renovating. A few scenes were shot in the Burlington area; the undisturbed future were shot by the Papa Gino's in what was then the Burlington Square Mall and the 1950s diner was Libby's Blue Line Diner (now Athens Diner) by I-89 Exit 16.

In 2004, when asked if he was considering a sequel, Giancola said: "We don't have any plans for a sequel, there have been so many time travel films since covering the same material, I don't feel I have anything new to add."

== Release ==
To make the title of the movie more comprehensible in the Asian markets, the title of the movie was changed to Time Chasers, from Tangents.

In 2008, a new "Special Anniversary Edition" of the film was released with deleted scenes, new audio commentary and in-depth, humorous interviews, including "Memories In Time" by filmmaker Andrew Gannon.

=== Reception ===
In 1994, Time Chasers won the first-place Gold Award in the independent category at the WorldFest-Houston International Film Festival.

== Mystery Science Theater 3000 ==
Time Chasers was featured in episode #821 of Mystery Science Theater 3000, which premiered on the Sci-Fi Channel on November 22, 1997. In recapping the episode, show writer Paul Chaplin laments the oft-used time-travel plot device, but he has a positive impression of the filmmakers. Chaplin writes the MST3K crew "got a definite sense that the whole project was undertaken by a group of well-adjusted people. That is certainly not true of most of our movies, and they're to be commended. And truth be told -- and remember, I'm only saying this in order to be polite -- this really isn't a horrible film."

The film initially lost money, but licensing fees for its Mystery Science Theater 3000 appearance took its earnings out of the red. For the showing on MST3K, the cast and crew had a reunion party to view the lampooning. MST3K star Michael J. Nelson claims that some at the party were not happy at the mocking, in particular Peter Harrington. However, director Giancola said they all "laughed their asses off", but also admitted that some people at the time "took it a bit too seriously." Harrington was originally planned to appear in the episode as a guest but was unable to attend due to scheduling conflicts.

Time Chasers is considered one of the best MST3K episodes by critics. Elliott Kalan, head writer for MST3K Seasons 11 and 12, places Time Chasers as his fifth favorite episode, calling it a very "Vermont-feeling time travel adventure, which is just hilarious all the way through." In an article in Paste, writer Jim Vorel ranked the episode #7 out of 197 episodes from the first twelve seasons. Vorel calls Time Chasers "one of the most purely entertaining movies ever featured on MST3K, and its comfortable, cheesy badness fits it like a glove"—that cheesy badness including the lack of presence from the movie's star, the "strong cast of supporting actors," and "the movie’s seeming lack of budget for location scouting." Vorel also notes the host segments are standouts. Writer Courtney Enlow lists Time Chasers as one of the series' 25 essential episodes.

The MST3K version of Time Chasers was included as part of the Mystery Science Theater 3000 Collection, Vol. 5 DVD collection, released by Rhino and re-released by Shout! Factory on May 16, 2017. The other episodes in the collection are The Touch of Satan (episode #908), Merlin's Shop of Mystical Wonders (episode #1003), and Boggy Creek II: And the Legend Continues (episode #1006).
