= Chyna =

American professional wrestler and bodybuilder (1969–2016)

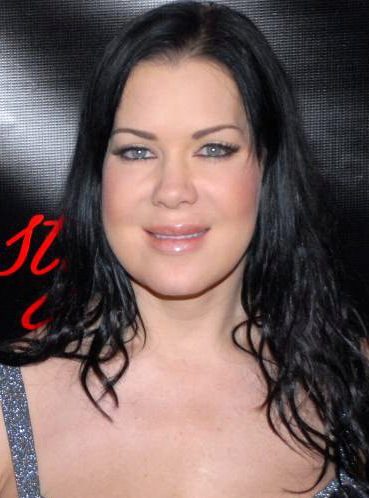
- Chyna in 2008
- Born: Joan Marie Laurer; December 27, 1969; Rochester, New York, U.S.
- Died: April 17, 2016 (aged 46); Redondo Beach, California, U.S.
- Resting place: Ashes scattered into the Pacific Ocean
- Education: University of Tampa
- Occupations: Professional wrestler; glamour model; pornographic actress; bodybuilder
- Partners: Gerry Blais (1994–1996); Triple H (1996–2000); Sean Waltman (2003–2005)
- Professional wrestling career
- Ring names: Chyna; Chyna Doll; Joanie Laurer; Joanie Lee; Just Joanie
- Billed height: 5 ft 10 in (178 cm)
- Billed weight: 200 lb (91 kg)
- Billed from: Londonderry, New Hampshire
- Trained by: Killer Kowalski; Inoki Dojo
- Debut: 1995
- Retired: 2011

YouTube information
- Channel: TOKYO CHYNA
- Years active: 2016–2016
- Genre: Podcasting
- Subscribers: 17.9 thousand
- Views: 3.9 million
- Last updated: July 3, 2026

Chyna (born Joan Marie Laurer; December 27, 1969 – April 17, 2016), also known as Joanie Laurer, was an American professional wrestler, fitness model, bodybuilder, actress, pornographic actress, and television personality.

Born in Rochester, New York, Chyna first rose to prominence in the World Wrestling Federation (WWF, now WWE) in 1997, where she was billed as "The Ninth Wonder of the World" (André the Giant was already billed as the eighth). A founding member of the stable D-Generation X as the promotion's first female enforcer, she held the WWF Intercontinental Championship twice and the WWF Women's Championship once. She was also the first woman to participate in the Royal Rumble match and King of the Ring tournament, in addition to becoming number one contender to the WWF Championship. She is considered one of the biggest stars of the Attitude Era. With singles victories over several prominent male wrestlers – including multiple-time world champions Triple H, Kurt Angle, Chris Jericho and Jeff Jarrett – she left what WWE called "a lasting legacy as the most dominant female competitor of all time". After leaving the WWF in 2001, she wrestled sporadically, with New Japan Pro-Wrestling (NJPW) in 2002 and Total Nonstop Action Wrestling (TNA) in 2011. The latter was her final appearance in the ring.

Outside of wrestling, Chyna appeared in Playboy magazine twice, plus numerous television shows and films. She was considered a sex symbol. In 2005, she was a cast member on VH1's The Surreal Life, which led to several other celebrity reality appearances on the network, including The Surreal Life: Fame Games in 2007 and Celebrity Rehab with Dr. Drew in 2008. Chyna was also known for her tumultuous relationship with fellow wrestler Sean Waltman.

In 2019, Chyna was posthumously entered into the WWE Hall of Fame as a member of D-Generation X, making her the first woman to be inducted as a part of a group or team.

== Early life ==
Joan Marie Laurer was born in Rochester, New York, on December 27, 1969. Her parents divorced when she was around four years old. She had three stepfathers and one stepmother. She said her first stepfather threatened suicide at one point, while her biological father had a problem with alcoholism and once accidentally stabbed her mother in the thigh with a butcher knife. From 1973 to 1983, she, her siblings and her mother moved several times.

As a child, Laurer learned to play violin and cello. She later said that in seventh grade she was sexually kissed by a much older teacher who worked at her school. At 13, while attending Penfield High School, she began purging after she ate. She left home at 16 when her mother tried to force her into a drug rehabilitation facility and lived with her biological father. That year, she began working out, and because her abdominal muscles were so strong, she did not feel any pain when she developed an ovarian tumor. She finished her last year of high school in Spain.

Laurer attended the University of Tampa, graduating in 1992 with a major in Spanish literature. She studied French and German there (she could converse in either language) and said that during this time she was raped by two men after getting drunk at a party. She was a member of the ROTC. She originally wanted to use her knowledge of foreign languages to work for the Federal Bureau of Investigation or Drug Enforcement Administration. She subsequently joined the Peace Corps and was assigned to Guatemala.

After returning from abroad, she held several jobs: a cocktail waitress in a strip club, singer in a band, and a 900-number chat line worker. In her mid-to-late 20s, while living in the Florida Keys, she took a six-week class to train as a flight attendant. On the way to her first flight, she was in a car crash and spent four days in the hospital. When she recovered, her sister Kathy helped her get a job selling pagers; they both also worked as belly dancers.

After college, Laurer began to regularly enter fitness competitions. In 1996, she competed in the New York City regional level of the Fitness America competition. Because of her large size compared to the other women, she usually finished in last place.

== Professional wrestling career ==
=== Early career (1995–1997) ===
Laurer trained at Wladek "Killer" Kowalski's professional wrestling school in Malden, Massachusetts. Her first match was in 1995 against a male wrestler dressed as a woman. While attending the school, she also worked for various independent promotions as Joanie Lee. Some of her earliest matches were set up by The Fabulous Moolah.

Laurer met World Wrestling Federation (WWF) performers Paul "Triple H" Levesque (then known as Hunter Hearst Helmsley) and Shawn Michaels after a professional wrestling show in 1996. After watching tapes of her matches, they decided to bring her into the WWF as a bodyguard. Vince McMahon, owner of the WWF, initially did not want her to join the company because he did not believe the audience would find a woman beating up men believable. While waiting for the WWF's decision, Laurer was approached by World Championship Wrestling (WCW), who wanted her to be the sole female member of the New World Order. She initially accepted the offer, but later turned it down when Shane McMahon, Vince McMahon's son, informed her that she was about to be hired by the WWF. However, Kowalski said that he got Laurer hired by the WWF after introducing her to Shane McMahon and telling him of WCW's interest in her.

=== World Wrestling Federation (1997–2001) ===
==== D-Generation X (1997–1999) ====
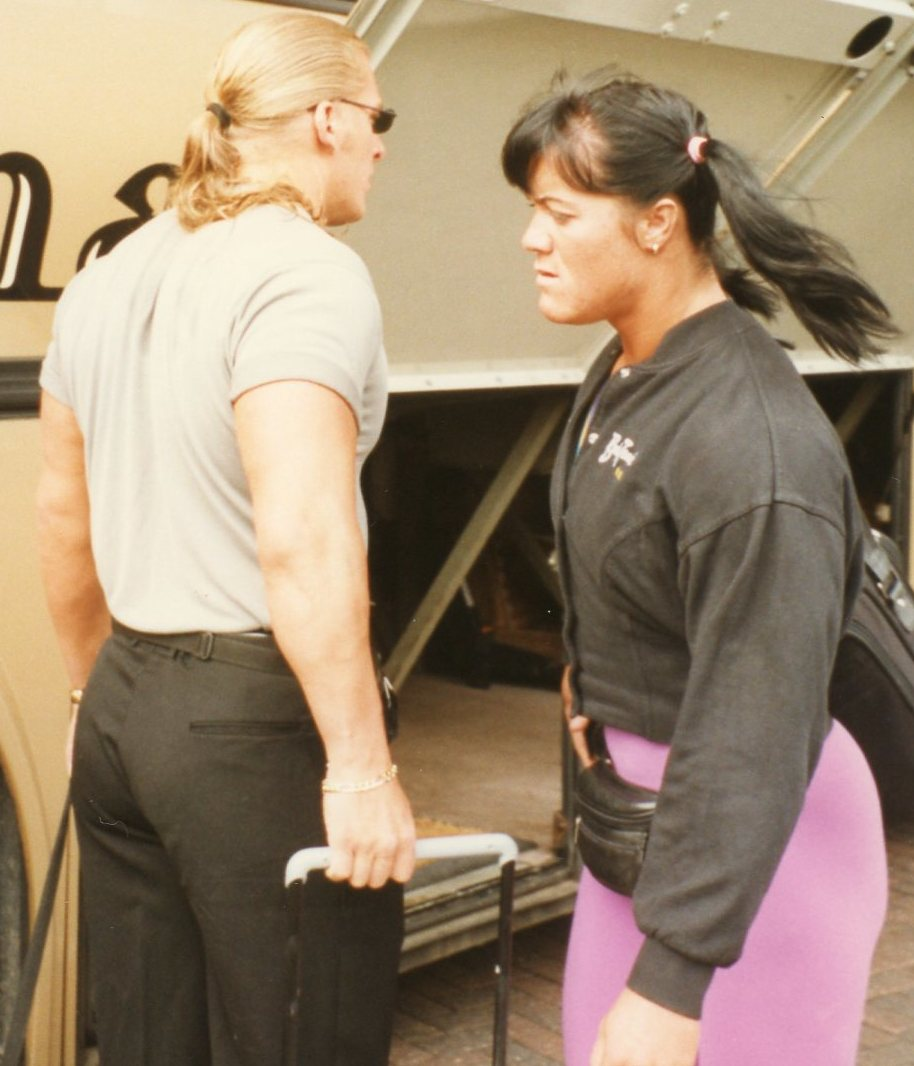
Chyna with Triple H in 1997

Laurer made her WWF debut on February 16, 1997, at In Your House 13: Final Four; her character emerged as a plant from a ringside seat, choking Marlena while Goldust was in the ring with Triple H. The next night, she appeared on Raw and bearhugged Marlena. Her original role in the promotion was as the laconic enforcer/bodyguard for D-Generation X, which was founded by Shawn Michaels, Triple H and Ravishing Rick Rude. She often helped them (then, a rising villain) cheat to win by physically interfering in matches by executing her trademark low blow to the groin. She was later given the ring name "Chyna", an intentionally ironic moniker; fine china is delicate and fragile, a sharp contrast to her character. Offstage, however, the male wrestlers were hesitant at first to let a woman be seen overpowering them.

During her time in D-Generation X, she was put in a romantic storyline with Mark Henry, member of the rival stable Nation of Domination. It started in August 1998 after The Rock ordered Henry to kiss Chyna to humiliate her, during which she fought back. Henry would chase her romantically, eventually threatening her with a storyline sexual harassment demand over one of her beatdowns if she didn't go to a date with him. Chyna accepted and eventually reconciled with him, becoming his on-screen girlfriend and ally. However, in January 1999, she revealed it was all a ruse to humiliate Henry.

A week after her storyline with Henry, Chyna was the 30th entrant in the Royal Rumble, becoming the first woman ever to enter the eponymous match. In the match she eliminated Mark Henry before being eliminated by Stone Cold Steve Austin. One day later, she turned heel by betraying Triple H and aligning herself with his enemies Vince McMahon and Kane. She teamed with Kane at the St. Valentine's Day Massacre pay-per-view against former allies X-Pac and Triple H. At WrestleMania XV, she turned on Kane in his match by attacking him with a chair, appearing to rejoin DX. Chyna and Triple H, however, turned against DX later that evening when they helped Shane McMahon defeat DX member X-Pac. The duo became part of The Corporation and later Shane McMahon's Corporate Ministry. Following the dissolution of the Corporate Ministry, the villainous Chyna remained at Triple H's side. They split up later that year.

==== Intercontinental Champion (1999–2000) ====
In June 1999, Chyna became the first woman to qualify for the King of the Ring tournament. She was also the first woman to be the number one contender for the WWF Championship, but lost the spot to Mankind before SummerSlam in August. Later that year, she became a fan favorite again during her long feud with Jeff Jarrett. She challenged the British Bulldog to a match on the October 4, 1999, Raw, and defeated him. At Unforgiven, she had a match for the WWF Intercontinental Championship against Jarrett, which she lost. She defeated Jarrett for the title at No Mercy in his last WWF match, a Good Housekeeping match on October 17, in the process becoming the first and only woman to win the Intercontinental Championship. She also gained the services of his valet, Miss Kitty. Laurer said that Jarrett demanded (and received) $300,000 from Vince McMahon to lose the title cleanly to a woman. His contract had expired on October 16, and he was therefore not contractually obligated to appear on the pay-per-view. If he had not appeared, the WWF would have been criticized for false advertising, and the title's lineage would have been broken.

Chyna then feuded with Chris Jericho over the belt, defeating him at Survivor Series, but losing the title to him at Armageddon. They faced off again in a match on the December 28 edition of SmackDown!, which ended controversially with both wrestlers pinning each other. As a result, then "head of authority" Stephanie McMahon-Helmsley declared them co-champions. At the Royal Rumble, Jericho and Chyna defended the title against Hardcore Holly in a Triple Threat match to determine the Intercontinental Champion, which Jericho won. Chyna's "co-champions" reign is no longer recognized by WWE and is now considered a continuation of Jericho's second Intercontinental reign. Afterwards, Chyna briefly teamed with Jericho.

==== Eddie Guerrero, Women's Champion, WWF departure (2000–2001) ====
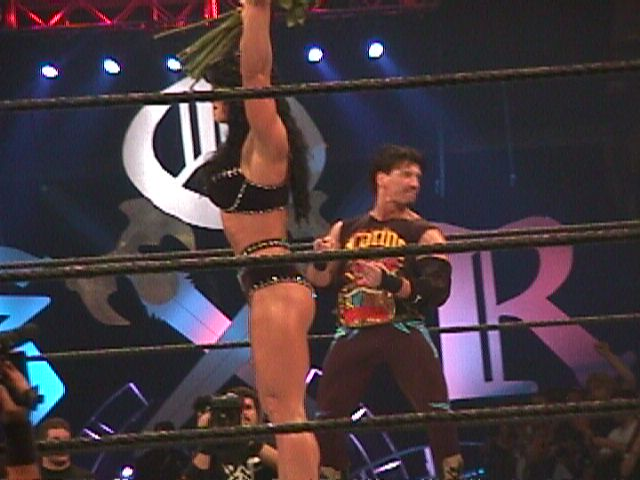
Chyna at the King of the Ring event with Eddie Guerrero in June 2000

Not long after losing the Intercontinental title, Chyna became the onscreen girlfriend of Eddie Guerrero. Originally villains, they became fan favorites during the summer of 2000, with Guerrero dubbing her his "Mamacita". They faced Val Venis and then-rookie Trish Stratus in an intergender tag team match at SummerSlam with the Intercontinental Championship on the line. Chyna won the match, but lost the belt two weeks later to Guerrero in a Triple Threat match with Kurt Angle. They officially split in November 2000 after Chyna, in storyline, found Eddie cavorting in the shower with two other women.

At the same time, Chyna posed nude for Playboy magazine's November 2000 issue. It was also worked into a WWF storyline (based, in part, on a real-life legal feud between the WWF and the socially conservative Parents Television Council), in which it drew the ire of the Right to Censor, a professional wrestling stable. Shortly after, Chyna began a feud with Ivory, a member of the Right to Censor, over the Women's Championship. It culminated in a storyline at the Royal Rumble where Chyna appeared to reinjure her neck while performing a handspring back elbow. To convince the audience she was injured, color commentator Jerry Lawler left the commentators' booth and entered the ring to check on her condition, something he had not done since the in-ring accident that killed Owen Hart in 1999. When she returned from the "injury", she won the Women's Championship from Ivory at WrestleMania X-Seven in a squash match. She also defended her title against Lita at Judgment Day in 2001. She soon vacated the title, however, as it was her final WWF match.

She left the WWF on November 30, 2001, several months after she had been taken off of television. Various accounts of her departure have circulated over the years. Behind the scenes, her former real-life boyfriend Paul "Triple H" Levesque began a relationship with Stephanie McMahon; Chyna said the pair began seeing each other before she and Levesque had broken up. In a 2002 interview with The Baltimore Sun, Chyna indicated that the breakup with Levesque had nothing to do with her leaving WWF, instead saying she departed to pursue an acting career. At the time of Chyna's departure from WWF, a statement from Jim Ross, then Executive Vice President of Talent Relations, reported it was "mutually agreed" to let her WWF contract expire in order for her to explore other career options. In a 2015 interview with Vince Russo, Chyna said after a meeting with Vince McMahon about the Stephanie McMahon situation, she was sent home and later received a fax telling her that she was not needed anymore. After Chyna's 2016 death, Chyna's sister Kathy reported the wrestler was offered a new WWF contract in 2001 with a minimum salary of $400,000 per year but she refused to sign the contract. Ross later confirmed this account, adding that Laurer would not accept an offer with a base salary of less than $1 million, characterizing the demand as "outrageous" and unrealistic, leaving WWF officials reluctant to negotiate with her despite her fan popularity.

=== Japan (2002) ===
After the end of her WWF career in 2001, Chyna made her way to Japan in 2002 where she had a relatively brief but productive stint with New Japan Pro-Wrestling (NJPW). Her first appearance was at the New Japan Thirtieth Anniversary Show, refereeing a bout between the Steiner Brothers and Hiroshi Tanahashi and Kensuke Sasaki. On August 8, 2002, Chyna defeated woman boxer Chika Nakamura for Universal Fighting Arts Organization, beating Nakamura in the first round by TKO. In September and October 2002, she wrestled several matches for the promotion. After losing to Masahiro Chono on October 14, 2002, Laurer performed her final match on October 26, teaming with a fake Great Muta played by Troy Enders in a loss to Hiroshi Tanahashi and Kenzo Suzuki. Despite working with the biggest names like Masahiro Chono and Hiroshi Tanahashi, Chyna could not break out as a relevant player for NJPW.

=== Total Nonstop Action Wrestling (2011) ===
During the May 3, 2011 tapings for the May 12 edition of Impact!, Chyna made her Total Nonstop Action Wrestling (TNA) debut, introduced by the returning Spike TV network consultant Mick Foley. He introduced her as Kurt Angle's business associate (she had been previously referred to as his "Mistress") and tag team partner at Sacrifice, where they would face Jeff Jarrett and Karen Jarrett. During the taping she also took part in a battle royal, where she eliminated Jeff. At Sacrifice on May 15, Chyna submitted Karen for the win in the mixed tag team match. She left TNA shortly after, making Sacrifice 2011 her final wrestling match.

== Other media ==
=== Playboy ===
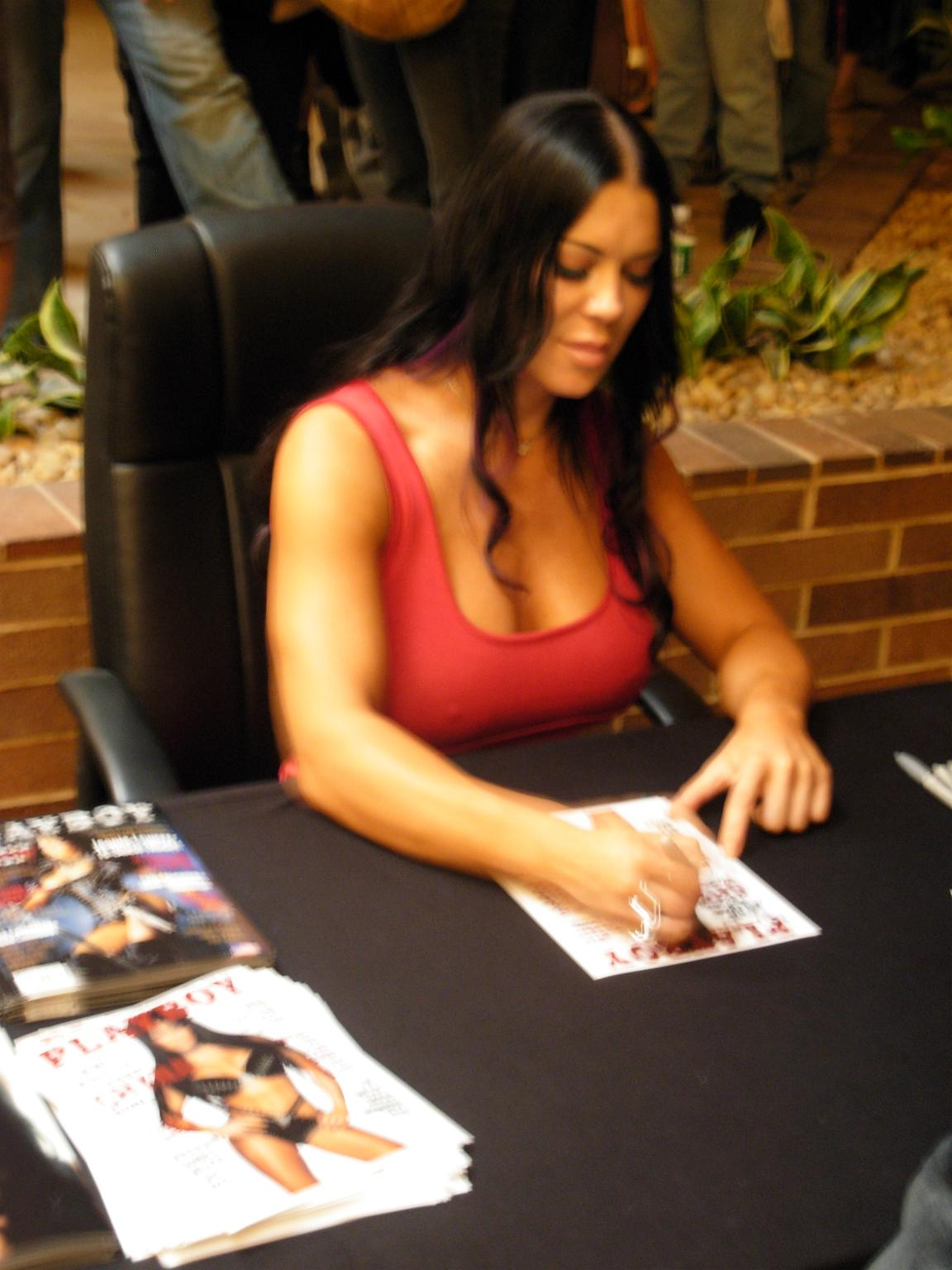
Chyna autographing her Playboy issue in 2007

Laurer modeled nude for Playboy in the November 2000 issue. In 2002, following her departure from the WWF, she appeared in a second nude pictorial. She also filmed a Playboy adult documentary, Joanie Laurer Nude: Wrestling Superstar to Warrior Princess, which followed her on the set.

=== Literature ===
In 2001, Laurer released her autobiography, If They Only Knew. It spent time on The New York Times' bestseller list.

=== Television and film ===
Laurer appeared on The Howard Stern Show in 2000, where she claimed she "made [an ass] out of [her]self." She acted in three episodes of 3rd Rock from the Sun as Janice, a police officer who briefly dated main character Harry Solomon. She also filmed several commercials for nutritional supplement Stacker 2. She was a presenter at the MTV Video Music Awards.

In 2001, she was a guest on a special celebrity edition of Fear Factor. She lost in the final round of the competition to Coolio. She provided her voice for stop-motion animation renditions of herself in Celebrity Deathmatch and Gary & Mike. The next year, she was reportedly considered for a part in Terminator 3: Rise of the Machines, but lost the role to Kristanna Loken. She hosted Robot Wars: Grand Champions in 2002, and appeared on the celebrity game show Hollywood Squares in 2003.

Laurer appeared as Lulu in Sevendust's music video for the song "Enemy" in 2003.

In early 2005, she debuted on The Surreal Life with housemates Da Brat, Jane Wiedlin, Adrianne Curry, Christopher Knight, Marcus Schenkenberg and Verne Troyer. On the show, she drank heavily, appeared nude, and got into an argument with her ex, Sean Waltman. She remained friends with Adrianne Curry after the show and made a brief cameo on her reality show My Fair Brady. She also appeared on The Surreal Life: Fame Games, which began airing on VH1 in January 2007. Filming took place in April 2006 in Las Vegas. She was eliminated from the show in the seventh episode.

Also in 2006, Laurer appeared in Just Another Romantic Wrestling Comedy and Illegal Aliens, the latter of which was the last movie featuring Anna Nicole Smith. On Cristina's Court, a syndicated court-themed reality show, Laurer appeared in an episode originally airing July 14, 2007, in a civil dispute against a breeder of teacup chihuahuas. Judge Perez ruled in her favor and awarded her $4,000.

=== Adult films ===
Laurer made her adult film debut with the 2004 video 1 Night in China. Laurer and Sean Waltman approached Red Light District Video to distribute the homemade video, which was released in 2004. Laurer appeared in her second adult video, Another Night in China in 2009. In 2011, she starred in her first professional pornographic film for Vivid Video, Backdoor to Chyna. She also starred for Vivid as She-Hulk in their parody of The Avengers, released in May 2012. A spinoff feature centered on the She-Hulk character, She-Hulk XXX, was released to video in April 2013.

In one of her final YouTube videos before her death, she said that she'd had no ambitions to go into porn, but was "making lemonade out of lemons" after the video of her and X-Pac was released "without her permission".

== Personal life ==
Laurer's breast implants were custom-made for her after her first implants were ruptured during a wrestling match. She had also complained to her plastic surgeon that their largest implants did not suit her frame as she desired. The custom implants became the model for the Chyna 2000s, now marketed to large-framed women and female bodybuilders. Laurer said she paid $6,000 for them.

After leaving the WWF, Laurer was unable to use the name "Chyna" because of its trademark. She began using the name "Chyna Doll" for public appearances. In November 2007, she legally changed her name to Chyna.

From early 2012 until mid-2015, Laurer taught English in Japan. She converted to the Church of Jesus Christ of Latter-day Saints while there.

=== Family and relationships ===
Laurer had a strained relationship with her family. She last saw her mother at the age of 16, and she said that her father was never able to get over her decision not to pursue a career in law enforcement with the Federal Bureau of Investigation. She also alleged that her father took out several student loans in her name without her knowledge, leaving her with $40,000 in debt. On an episode of Celebrity Rehab with Dr. Drew in 2008, Laurer said she had a bad relationship with all of her family members, including her siblings.

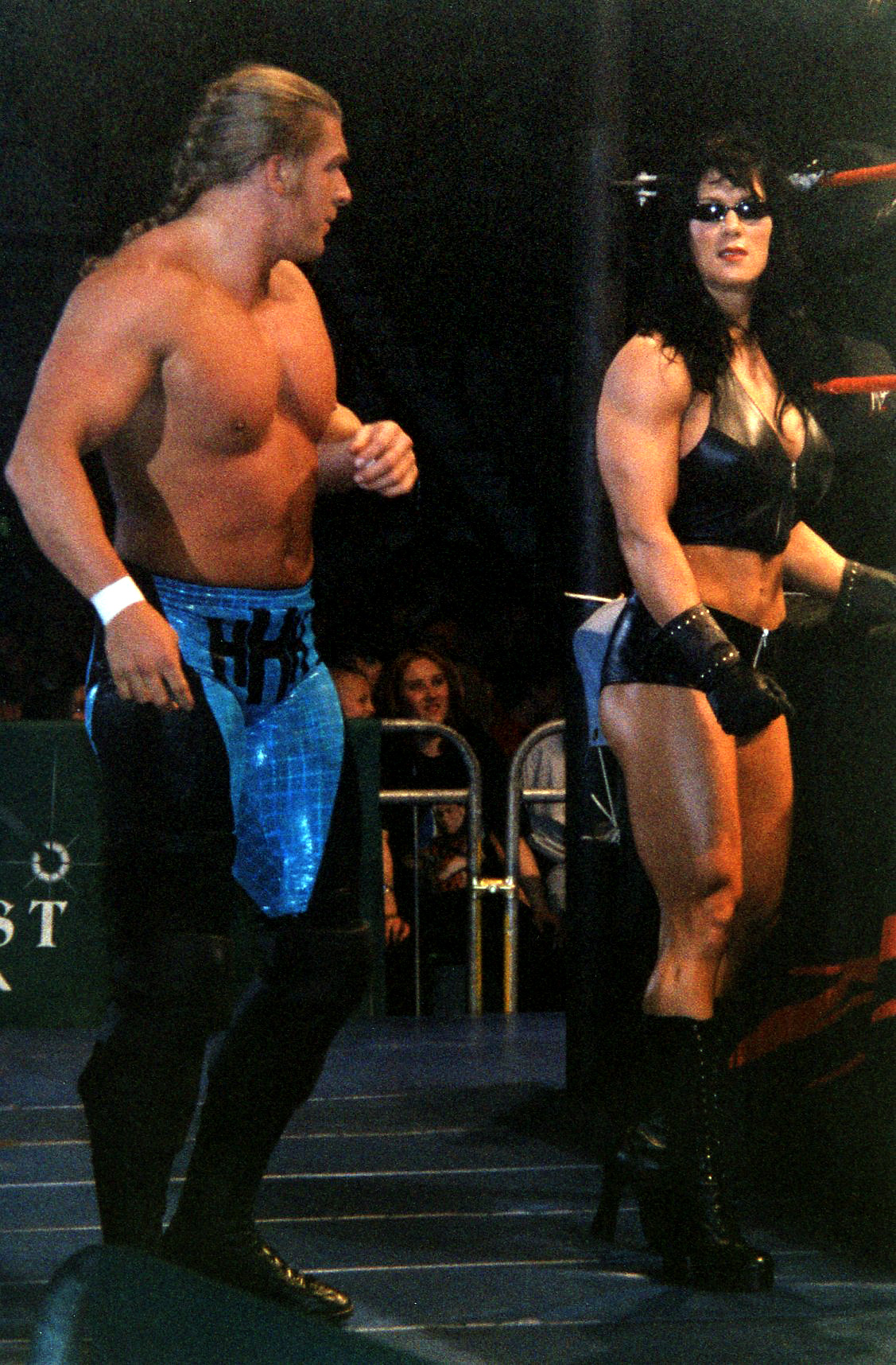
Laurer with Paul "Triple H" Levesque.

From 1996 until 2000, Laurer was in a relationship with fellow wrestler Paul "Triple H" Levesque. They initially hid their relationship from their co-workers because she felt people might think she "[slept] her way to the top". They also lived together for some time. There is some debate as to whether Levesque started his relationship with Stephanie McMahon while still with Laurer. However, after Laurer's death, her sister Kathy Hamilton told Bleacher Report that while Levesque "was very good to Joanie", the couple disagreed about future family plans (Levesque wanted children and Laurer did not), and that Laurer's mental health problems also contributed to their breakup.

Beginning in 2003, Laurer had a tumultuous relationship with fellow wrestler Sean Waltman. They were engaged for a period in 2003, then broke up, then became engaged again, a pattern that continued for the next two years. In 2004, they released a sex tape which was filmed in 2003. Eager for a repeat success, the company that released Paris Hilton's celebrity sex tape obtained the footage, edited it, and released it under the name 1 Night in China. It sold over 100,000 copies, with Laurer and Waltman earning a share of the profits. Laurer, however, maintained that she did not earn any money from the release. In January 2005, she was arrested for domestic assault after allegedly beating Waltman in front of his children and others.

=== Substance abuse ===
Laurer claimed that her "life was spinning out of control" around the time that she made the sex tape. In January 2005, Waltman said that she was battling drug and alcohol addiction, as well as mental illness. Days after the domestic dispute between Waltman and Laurer, it was reported in the New York Post that she had removed her clothes and jumped into a fish tank in a New York nightclub. That month, she made another appearance on The Howard Stern Show, where she was described as "slurring her words, contradicting herself and launching into random tangents that were impossible to follow." On the program, she said she did not want to do drugs anymore, but said that if a line of cocaine was in front of her, she would do it. After her appearance, she entered a facility specializing in depression recovery, and decided to stop drinking. In early 2008, she appeared on the VH1 reality TV show Celebrity Rehab with Dr. Drew, but said on the show that she did not consider herself an addict. On December 27, 2008, she was rushed to the hospital after her birthday party, where she was found unconscious with cuts on her arms.

In September 2010, Laurer was hospitalized after overdosing on sleeping medication. Laurer later re-established a good relationship with her mother; her father died on May 15, 2014.

== Death ==
On April 20, 2016, Laurer was found dead at her home in Redondo Beach, California at the age of 46. Her manager Anthony Anzaldo was concerned when she did not post updates or content to her usual social media outlets for several days, and subsequently found her body in her apartment. Initial police reports stated that she appeared to have died of either an accidental drug overdose or of natural causes. Anzaldo suggested that any overdose was accidental, saying that she was prescribed drugs, but tended to use them improperly.

Her brain was donated to science to study the effects of chronic traumatic encephalopathy (CTE). However, the brain had naturally decomposed to a point where it could not be definitively determined whether Laurer had CTE. A memorial service was held in Los Angeles on June 22, 2016. Among the attendees were wrestlers Melina Perez, Rob Van Dam, Sean Waltman and Johnny Mantell; actors C. Thomas Howell and Barry Williams; Dennis Hof, owner of the Bunny Ranch; and rappers Coolio and Baby Bash, who also performed during the memorial. Chyna was cremated and her ashes were scattered into the Pacific Ocean.

A report of her autopsy was released in December 2016 which determined that she died on April 17 of an overdose of alcohol, combined with the anxiety drugs diazepam and nordazepam, painkillers oxycodone and oxymorphone, and sleeping aid temazepam.

== Legacy ==
Numerous commentators have credited Chyna as being influential to women's wrestling and one of the biggest stars of WWF's Attitude Era. Commentator and former WWE official Jim Ross called her, "the distinctive athlete [who] was to WWE what Ronda Rousey has been to UFC", while E! News said that she accomplished more in her near-decade career than any other woman. Others praised her as a feminist icon who defied gender norms; Dawn Heinecken, a professor of women's and gender studies at the University of Louisville, wrote in 2004 that "She was demonized as a feminist who challenged male dominance ... Her latest, and most popular incarnation was that of a sex symbol". She was the first woman to compete in the Royal Rumble match and is the only woman to have held the WWE Intercontinental Championship. Luke Winkie of Sports Illustrated listed her as the 79th greatest wrestler of all time, while WWE named her the fourth greatest "Female Superstar in Modern WWE History" in 2021. Beth Phoenix credits her with "breaking down doors" in the industry, and Kimber Lee credits Chyna as her motivation for entering wrestling. In 2017, WWE Hall of Famer Tammy Sytch said Chyna should be inducted into the Hall of Fame, stating: "I believe she really opened up the doors for women's wrestling; not for Divas, but for the women's wrestling industry. She was wrestling men and it was believable because she was such a big personality, such a huge human being, and she should be rewarded for what she did."

[She] absolutely, definitely deserves to be in there. It'd be tough to pick a female that was more impactful on the business. She did something that was completely so out of left field that it wasn't even being considered when we first brought it up for her to come in. ... it wasn't an easy thing, and against all odds she did all of that. She earned everybody's trust. She won over the fans. She won over the boys. She did all of it.

— Paul Levesque on Chyna's Hall of Fame induction.

The day following her death, a post on WWE.com expressed sadness about it and featured a video of her winning the Women's Championship. After years without acknowledging Laurer, WWE played a posthumous tribute video on the April 25 episode of Raw. A short memorial article was also published on Howard Stern's official website, lamenting her death and describing her as "fan favorite [with a] great sense of humor about herself."

Columnist Mike Mooneyham of The Post and Courier stated after Chyna's death that it was "an oft-asked question" as to when she would be inducted into the WWE Hall of Fame. Jim Ross said that Chyna had an "overwhelming desire" to be inducted during her lifetime. On February 9, 2015, during a WWE Network podcast with Stone Cold Steve Austin, Paul Levesque mentioned that Chyna deserved to be in the Hall of Fame but that her career in pornography prohibited it. In interviews shortly after her death, Levesque said that she "definitely warranted" a place in the Hall of Fame and Stephanie McMahon said she was sure Chyna would be inducted but did not know what year it would happen.

Chyna was announced as an inductee into the WWE Hall of Fame class of 2019 on February 18, 2019, as part of D-Generation X. Levesque spoke to ESPN of the "complexities" he mentioned on the 2015 Austin podcast, but after describing her in-ring accomplishments he said she "100 percent deserves" the honor. Although she was being inducted as part of a group, Levesque said that she deserved to be inducted a second time as well for her individual career. Shawn Michaels also endorsed the idea of her being inducted a second time, stating: "Of all the people in this group, and D-Generation X as a whole is deserving, but I don't think there's anybody that would argue that [Chyna] is not the most deserving of [an induction]."

=== Posthumous documentary ===
On April 20, 2017, a trailer was released for Wrestling with Chyna, a special documentary featuring Chyna's life from almost her very beginning, to after she left the wrestling business, to her last days of life. On June 16, 2021, Vice TV aired the documentary with exclusive interviews from friends and family members and her manager Anthony Anzaldo.

== Filmography ==
Chyna film work
Year	Title	Role	Notes
1999	Beyond the Mat	Herself	Documentary
1999	Chyna & Triple H: It's Our Time	Herself	Documentary
2000	Chyna Fitness: More Than Meets the Eye	Herself	Fitness Video
2001	Alien Fury: Countdown to Invasion	Ava Zurich	Feature Film
2001	On the Line	One of Rod's dates	Feature Film
2002	Frank McKlusky, C.I.	Freeda	Feature Film
2002	Joanie Laurer Warrior Princess	Herself	
2002	Brown Sugar	Woman at Party	Uncredited
2003	Hunter: Back in Force	Brandy Rose	Direct to Video
2003	Romp	Lulu	Short
2006	Just Another Romantic Wrestling Comedy	Roxanne	Direct to Video
2007	Illegal Aliens	Rex	Direct to Video
2007	Cougar Club	Teddy Archibald	Direct to Video
2011	Losing Control	Barb	Feature Film
2012	A Night at the Silent Movie Theater	Sexy Drummer	
2013	White T	Psychic	

Chyna television work
Year	Title	Role	Notes
1996	Pacific Blue	Frank Finlay	"One Kiss Goodbye"
1998	WWF Shotgun Saturday Night	Herself	1 episode
1999	Biography	Herself	2 episodes
1999	The Martin Short Show	Herself	#1.44
1999	The Drew Carey Show	Herself	1 episode
1999	Beggars and Choosers	Extra	Uncredited, 1 episode
1999	True Life	Herself	1 episode
2000	Good Morning America	Herself	1 episode
2000	3rd Rock from the Sun	Janice	"This Little Dick Went to Market" "The Big Giant Head Returns Again: Part 1 and 2"
2000	Pacific Blue	Tonya Sweet	"Kidnapped"
2000	The Daily Show	Herself	1 episode
2000	2000 MTV Music Video Awards	Herself	TV special
2000	The Tonight Show with Jay Leno	Herself	3 episodes
2000	Open Mike with Mike Bullard	Herself	1 episode
2000	Mad TV	Herself	#6.5
2000	MTV Cribs	Herself	"Laurer, Tony Hawk, and Usher"
2000-2001	Off the Record	Herself	2 episodes
2000-2005	The Howard Stern Show	Herself	6 episodes
2001	Celebrity Deathmatch	Herself	"Where Is Einstein's Brain?"
2001	Gary & Mike	Herself	"Road Rage"
2001	Late Night with Conan O'Brien	Herself	1 episode
2001	Nickelodeon Kids Choice Awards	Herself	TV special
2001	The Test	Herself	1 episode
2001	Fear Factor	Herself	"First Celebrity Fear Factor"
2001–2002	Tracker	Rhee	"Pilot" / "Remember When"
2002	Sabrina, the Teenage Witch	Mary Jo Ponder	"Driving Mr. Goodman"
2002	The 44th Annual Grammy Awards	Herself	TV special
2002	The Nick Cannon Show	Herself	"Nick Takes Over Fitness"
2002	Relic Hunter	Natasha Tripova	"Antianeirai"
2002	Professional Wrestling: The Tricks of the Trade	Herself	Documentary
2002	Whose Line Is It Anyway?	Herself	#5.8
2002	Celebrity Boxing 2	Herself	TV special
2002	The 2002 Billboard Music Awards	Herself	TV special
2002	The Anna Nicole Show	Herself	"The Anna Nicole Show Holiday Special"
2003	Hollywood Squares	Herself	3 episodes
2003	The 31st Annual American Music Awards	Herself	TV special
2005	The 31st Annual People's Choice Awards	Herself	TV special
2005	The Surreal Life	Herself	Series role
2005	101 Reasons Not To Be A Pro Wrestler	Herself	Documentary
2005	Queer Edge with Jack E. Jett	Herself	1 episode
2006	Trantasia	Herself	1 episode
2006	Jimmy Kimmel Live!	Herself	1 episode
2006	The Tyra Banks Show	Herself	1 episode
2006	Christina's Court	Herself	1 episode
2006	My Fair Brady	Herself	"Love On the Rocks (Therapy Part 1)"
2006-2011	Howard Stern OnDemand	Herself	6 episodes
2007	Comedy Central Roast	Herself	1 episode
2007	Scream Awards 2007	Herself	TV special
2007	Entertainment Tonight	Herself	2 episodes
2007	The Surreal Life: Fame Games	Herself	Series role
2008	Celebrity Rehab	Herself	Series role
2008	What Perez Sez!	Herself	1 episode
2008	Reality Bites Back	Herself	1 episode
2008	E! True Hollywood Story	Herself	1 episode
2011	2011 AVN Awards Show	Herself	TV special
2011	E:60	Herself	1 episode
2012	Addicted To Fame	Herself	Documentary
2012	2012 AVN Awards Show	Herself	TV special
2012	Adult Insider	Herself	1 episode
2013	Fashion News Live	Herself	1 episode
2014	RuPaul's Drag Race	Herself	Archive footage, 1 episode
2015	Vice Sports	Herself	1 episode
2016	Botched	Herself	Unaired
2019	Celebrity Page	Herself	Posthumous, archive footage, 1 episode
2019	Autopsy: The Last Hours of...	Herself	Posthumous, archive footage, 1 episode
2021	Wrestling with Chyna	Herself	Posthumous documentary
2021	Untold	Herself	Posthumous, archive footage, 1 episode
2021-2023	Biography: WWE Legends	Herself	Posthumous, archive footage, 3 episodes
2022	WWE Rivals	Herself	Posthumous, archive footage, 1 episode
2023	Chyna: Wrestling with Demons	Herself	Posthumous documentary
2024	Mr. McMahon	Herself	Posthumous, archive footage, 1 episode
2025	WWE's Greatest Moments	Herself	Posthumous, archive footage, 1 episode

Chyna pornographic work
Year	Title	Role	Notes
2004	1 Night in China	Herself	
2009	Another Night in China	Herself	
2011	Backdoor to Chyna	Herself	
2012	Avengers XXX: A Porn Parody	She-Hulk	
2012	Chyna Is Queen of the Ring	Herself	
2013	She Hulk XXX: A Porn Parody	She-Hulk	
2023	Nothing Better Than Parody 5	She-Hulk	Posthumous, compilation

Chyna video game work
Year	Title	Role
1999	WWF Attitude	—N/a
1999	WWF WrestleMania 2000	—N/a
2000	WWF SmackDown!	Cover Athlete
2000	WWF No Mercy	—N/a
2000	WWF SmackDown! 2: Know Your Role	Cover Athlete
2001	WWF SmackDown!: Just Bring It	Removed, unplayable
2018	WWE SuperCard	DLC
2019	WWE 2K20	—N/a
2021	WWE 2K Battlegrounds	—N/a
2022	WWE 2K22	—N/a
2023	WWE 2K23	—N/a
2024	WWE 2K24	
2025	WWE 2K25	
2026	WWE 2K26	Cover Athlete of Attitude Era and Monday night wars special edition

== Championships and accomplishments ==
- AVN Awards
  - Best-Selling Title (2006) - 1 Night in China
  - Best Celebrity Sex Tape (2012) - Backdoor to Chyna
- International Wrestling Federation
  - IWF Women's Championship (1 time)
- Ladies International Wrestling Association
  - Rookie of the Year (1998)
- Professional Girl Wrestling Association
  - Rookie of the Year (1996)
- Pro Wrestling Illustrated
  - Ranked No. 106 of the top 500 wrestlers of the year 2000 in the PWI 500
- Women's Wrestling Hall of Fame
  - Class of 2025
- World Wrestling Federation / WWE
  - WWF Intercontinental Championship (2 times)
  - WWF Women's Championship (1 time)
  - WWE Hall of Fame (Class of 2019) – as a member of D-Generation X
  - Houston Royal Rumble (1999)
  - Ranked No. 4 of the top 50 Greatest WWE Female Superstars of all time (2021)

== See also ==
- List of premature professional wrestling deaths
