= Red Light District Video =

American pornographic film studio

- Type: Private
- Industry: Pornography
- Founded: 2001; 25 years ago
- Founders: Dion Giarrusso; David Joseph
- Headquarters: Chatsworth, California, U.S.
- Area served: Worldwide
- Key people: David Joseph (President)
- Products: Pornographic films
- Services: video on demand
- Owner: David Joseph
- Website: www.clubredlight.com

Red Light District Video (RLD) is an American independent pornographic film studio headquartered in Chatsworth, California.

== History ==
The company was founded in 2001 by industry veteran Dion Giarrusso and his half-brother David Joseph, who co-owned the company. Giarrusso had previously worked as general manager of Elegant Angel, whilst Joseph was new to the industry. Giarrusso established the Red Light brand by using his existing industry contacts, and launching an aggressive marketing campaign. Film production was overseen by performer and director Vince Vouyer, who had previously been an exclusive director at Anabolic Video. The plan was to emulate Evil Angel's setup where producers/directors would own their own movies, and share in the profits. Other initial directors included Michael Stefano, John Strong and Mark Wood. The company strove to produce hardcore gonzo pornography with higher production values than much of the gonzo of the time, and filmed in luxurious mansions rather than hotel rooms. The studio's first film was 110% Natural, which was released on November 1, 2001. Initially Red Light released one film a week, and produced more than 50 films in its first year.

In 2003 Platinum X Pictures was launched by Michael Stefano and Jewel De'Nyle (who would later marry), bankrolled by Giarrusso and Red Light. Platinum X featured directors Manuel Ferrara, Brandon Iron and Steve Holmes, and produced very similar content to Red Light. Around the same time Red Light began distributing the films of Amateur District and Candy Shop, a studio headed by Stefano that specialized in interracial content. De'Nyle left Platinum X in June 2006.

Vouyer and Giarrusso eventually brought over many of Vince's colleagues from Anabolic in 2004. Erik Everhard, Lexington Steele, and Mike John joined RLD, where they could start their own production companies to be distributed by the RLD infrastructure. Steele's stay was brief, as he left to start his own studio, Mercenary Pictures, after only a few releases at Red Light.

In 2004 Giarrusso left the company. Joseph bought out his share and took over the reins, slowly shifting from a business model based on producer/director ownership, to a model where he owned more and more titles, and could profit accordingly. He, for all intents and purposes, merged RLD and PXP, 'promoting' Stefano and Ferrara to RLD.

After negotiations with Rick Salomon, Joseph was able to get rights to 2004's massive hit movie, 1 Night in Paris, starring Paris Hilton. Salomon had initially been distributing the tape himself, following a legal battle with the Hilton family, and he and Red Light agreed to pay Hilton $400,000 plus a percentage of the tape's sales. However, in a 2006 interview with GQ magazine, Hilton stated: "I never received a dime from (the video). It's just dirty money and (Salomon) should give it all to some charity for the sexually abused or something." The film went on to be the top-selling and renting porn film of 2005, and Joseph claims it is one of the top-selling pornographic films of all time. The success of 1 Night in Paris and the media attention it aroused was a huge publicity boost for the company. Other celebrity sex tapes followed; the same year Red Light released 1 Night in China, starring Sean Waltman and WWE wrestler Joanie Laurer, and it has also distributed Screeched, featuring Dustin Diamond, Amy Fisher Caught On Tape and Joey Buttafuoco Caught on Tape.

In early 2006, several of the RLD directors decided they weren't getting a fair share, and announced they were leaving. Erik Everhard and Ferrara joined Evil Angel. Everhard sued Red Light for breach of contract, conversion, claim and delivery and accounting, and was awarded $141,000 in damages. Mike John joined Jules Jordan's new company Jules Jordan Video, and Vince Vouyer left to start Vouyer Media, to be distributed by Wicked Pictures.

In January 2006, Giarrusso launched his new production company Combat Zone. In November, 2006, Elegant Angel announced that it would distribute its videos in Europe exclusively through Red Light District, however in April 2007, Elegant Angel instead launched its own European division, Elegant Angel Europe.

In 2007 RL sold its sister companies Platinum X Pictures, Amateur District and The Candy Shop. It also settled a lawsuit over a sex tape that was filmed on Kid Rock's tour bus. In May 2007 the studio stopped handling its own distribution when it signed an exclusive deal with Pulse Distribution.

RLD currently releases two new titles per week. It distributes its content via DVDs, video on demand and satellite television. Red Light films can also be downloaded to iPods and mobile phones.

== Directors ==
Current Red Light directors include Mark Wood, Michael Stefano and Mr. Pete.

== Awards ==
The following is a selection of some of the major awards RLD films have won.

- 2003 AVN Award - 'Best Oral-Themed Feature' for "Throat Gaggers"
- 2004 AVN Award - 'Best Pro-Am or Amateur Release' for Breakin' Em in 5
- 2004 AVN Award - 'Best Pro-Am Release' for Breakin' Em in 5
- 2005 AVN Award - 'Top Renting Release of the Year' for 1 Night in Paris
- 2005 AVN Award - 'Top Selling Release of the Year' for 1 Night in Paris
- 2006 AVN Award - 'Best Anal Scene Coupling (Video)' for Manuel Ferrara & Katsumi in Cumshitters
- 2006 AVN Award - 'Best P.O.V. Release' for Manuel Ferrara's POV
- 2006 AVN Award - 'Best Specialty Series' for Cum Drippers
- 2006 AVN Award - 'Top Selling Release of the Year' for 1 Night in China
- 2008 AVN Award - 'Best MILF Series' for Momma Knows Best
- 2008 F.A.M.E. Award - 'Favorite Celebrity Sex Tape' for 1 Night in Paris
- 2009 AVN Award - 'Best Ethnic-Themed Series - Latin' for Young Tight Latinas
- 2010 XBIZ Award - 'Transsexual Movie of the Year' for My Girlfriend's Cock 5
