= Rick Salomon =

American poker player (born 1969)

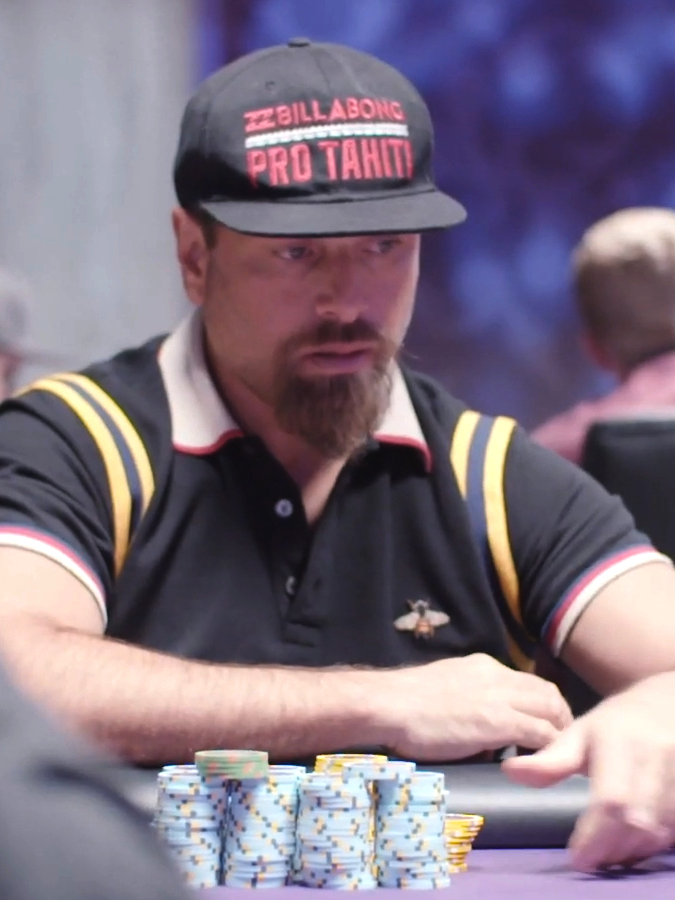
- Salomon in 2018
- Born: Richard Allan Salomon; January 24, 1969 (age 57); Neptune Township, New Jersey, U.S.
- Occupation: Poker player
- Years active: 2003–present
- Spouses: E. G. Daily (m. 1995; div. 2000) Shannen Doherty (m. 2002; ann. 2003) Pamela Anderson (m. 2007; ann. 2008) (m. 2014; div. 2015)
- Children: 2

Richard Allan Salomon (born January 24, 1969) is an American high-stakes poker player, who is best known for his 2004 sex tape with Paris Hilton. He also had high-profile marriages with E.G. Daily, Shannen Doherty, and Pamela Anderson. As a poker player, Salomon has cashed in three consecutive editions of the Big One for One Drop format, including fourth place at the 2014 WSOP event for $2.8 million, third place at the 2016 Monte-Carlo One Drop Extravaganza for approximately $3.3 million, and fourth place at the 2018 WSOP event for $2.84 million.

== Early life ==
Salomon was born and raised in Neptune Township, New Jersey. He is Jewish.

== Career ==
Salomon owned an online gambling site.

His only outright tracked live tournament victory came at the 2006 Bellagio Cup II $1,000 No-Limit Hold'em event, which he won for $125,715.

On July 1, 2014, Salomon finished fourth in the World Series of Poker's Big One for One Drop for $2.8 million.

In October 2016, Salomon finished third in the €1,000,000 Monte-Carlo One Drop Extravaganza for €3,000,000 (approximately US$3.3 million), his largest single career cash. He was eliminated by Anatoly Gurtovoy after three-bet shoving with queen-jack and losing to ace-queen.

At the 2018 WSOP, Salomon again finished fourth in the Big One for One Drop, this time for $2.84 million.

Salomon has made regular TV poker appearances on PokerGO shows including World Series of Poker coverage, Super High Roller Bowl coverage, Rob's Home Game, Poker After Dark, and High Stakes Poker. Salomon was one of the new players appearing in Season 8 of High Stakes Poker and appeared in the first eight episodes. Salomon played one of the biggest pots of the season against Bryn Kenney, when he beat Kenney's set with a straight, winning $868,200.

Salomon returned for Season 11 of High Stakes Poker in 2023, where he flopped top set of tens against Charles Yu and won a $1,109,000 pot, at the time the largest in the show's history.

He appeared again in Season 14 in 2025, playing $500/$1,000 with straddles. In Episode 9 he bluffed $567,000 with six-high against Justin Gavri, one of the season's most-discussed hands. In Episode 12 he lost approximately $1,080,000 in a single pot with ace-rag, at the time of airing the second-largest pot in the show's history.

Salomon's most recent tracked live tournament cash came in November 2018, when he finished second in the ARIA Fall Madness $100,000 High Roller for $672,000. His total tracked live tournament winnings stand at $9,906,283 across 13 cashes.

== Al-Khereiji poker debt case ==
In 2014, Salomon played a 48-hour private cash game against Sheikh Raad al-Khereiji at the Tiara Miramar Beach Hotel in Théoule-sur-Mer, France, reportedly winning US$2.8 million. Al-Khereiji subsequently declined to settle the debt, characterising the session as a friendly game with no financial stake.

Salomon sued in the Tribunal de Grasse. In December 2019, the court ruled against him, citing articles 1965 and 1966 of the French Civil Code of 1804, which limit enforceable gambling debts to games "involving weapons, foot or horse racing, chariot races, tennis and other games of the sort which involve physical skill and exercise." The court found that poker did not meet that threshold. Court records disclosed during proceedings showed al-Khereiji had spent approximately $34 million over 29 months in the ARIA Resort and Casino's high-stakes poker room, where the minimum buy-in was $100,000.

== Personal life ==
=== Sex tape ===
In 2003, a sex tape featuring Salomon and then-girlfriend Paris Hilton was leaked onto the Internet. Shortly afterward, Salomon filed a lawsuit against the company that distributed the tape, and against the Hilton family, whom he accused of tarnishing his reputation by suggesting that he had exploited Hilton. Salomon further claimed in his $10 million suit that representatives of the Hiltons tried to discourage media outlets from playing excerpts of the tape by saying that Hilton was underage when the tape was made (which would have made showing the tape illegal – Hilton was actually 20 when the tape was filmed), and were attempting to crush him to preserve the image they had created for her. Hilton later sued the company that released the tape, Kahatani Ltd., for $30 million for violation of privacy and emotional distress.

In April 2004, Salomon began distributing the tape himself through the adult film company Red Light District Video under the title 1 Night in Paris. In July 2004, Salomon dropped his lawsuit against the Hilton family after Paris Hilton's privacy lawsuit was thrown out of court. Salomon and Red Light District Video agreed to pay Hilton $400,000 plus a percentage of the tape's sale profit.

=== Marriages ===
In 1995, Salomon married voice actress Elizabeth Daily. The couple had two daughters, before divorcing in 2000.

In 2002, Salomon married actress Shannen Doherty. The marriage was annulled after nine months.

On September 29, 2007, Salomon and actress Pamela Anderson applied for a marriage license in Las Vegas. Anderson had told talk-show host Ellen DeGeneres in September that she was engaged; she referred to her fiancé only as a poker player. The couple married on October 6, 2007, during a break between the 7 p.m. and 10 p.m. shows of "Hans Klok's The Beauty of Magic" at Planet Hollywood resort, where Anderson was starring as a magician's assistant. Salomon and Anderson separated less than ten weeks later and, on December 14, Anderson filed for divorce citing irreconcilable differences. Two days later, Anderson and Salomon were seen shopping together. Anderson later posted a message on her website indicating that they were reconciling. On December 28, 2007, Anderson's attorney filed a proof of service of summons in Los Angeles Superior Court regarding the divorce claim. In February 2008, Anderson filed to have the marriage annulled, citing fraud. The following month, Salomon also filed for an annulment, and also cited fraud. The marriage was annulled on March 24, 2008.

In January 2014, Anderson announced that she and Salomon had married on an unspecified date.

Anderson again filed for divorce from Salomon on July 3, 2014, while Salomon filed for an annulment in Nevada on grounds of fraud. On April 29, 2015, her divorce was granted, with a $1 million settlement payment from Salomon to Anderson.
