= Icebreaker (film) =

- Directed by: David Giancola
- Written by: Hasso Wuerslin, David Giancola
- Starring: Sean Astin; Stacy Keach; Bruce Campbell
- Production companies: Edgewood Studios; Two Left Shoes Films
- Release date: May 2000
- Country: United States
- Language: English

Icebreaker is a 2000 action film starring Sean Astin, Stacy Keach and Bruce Campbell and written and directed by David Giancola. It was filmed at the Killington Ski Resort in Killington, Vermont.

== Plot ==
Terrorists, led by Carl Greig, take over a mountain ski resort with a stolen nuclear weapon. Ski patrolman Matt Foster must stop them from blowing up the mountain.

== Cast ==
- Sean Astin as Matt Foster
- Bruce Campbell as Carl Greig
- Stacy Keach as Bill Foster
- Suzanne Turner as Meg Foster
- John James as Will Langley
- Mark "Woody" Keppel as Beck
- Paul Schnabel as Frantz
- Rick Kincaid as Clay
- Hasso Wuerslin as Josh

== Home media ==
The film was released on DVD April 29, 2003.

== RiffTrax ==
The creators of the television series Mystery Science Theater 3000 released a parody audio track for Icebreaker by RiffTrax, which was released in January 2016.
