= David Giancola =

American filmmaker

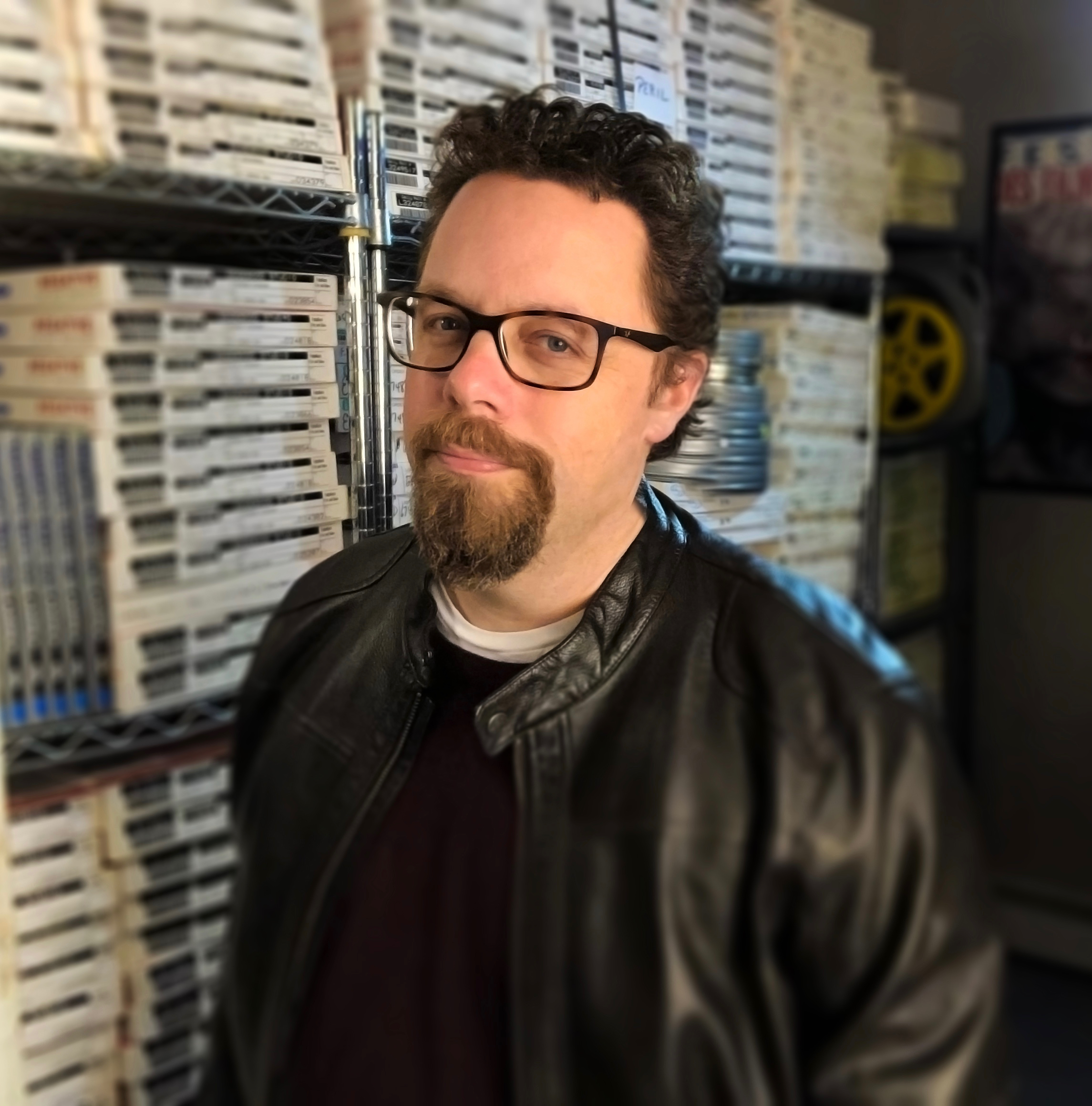
- Born: June 24, 1969 (age 57); Rutland, Vermont, U.S.
- Occupations: Film Director, Screenwriter, Producer, Cinematographer

David Giancola (born June 24, 1969) is a Vermont-based American filmmaker. Born in Rutland, Vermont, he has directed, produced, and/or functioned as director of photography on over 35 feature films as of December 2019.

== Career ==
Giancola's first short film was an adaptation of the comic book The Spirit, made with the blessing of comic book legend Will Eisner and featuring original artwork from the master cartoonist. At age 21, with no film school training, he wrote and directed his first feature, the meager-budget (now cult) sci-fi film Time Chasers. Giancola then directed over twenty feature films and TV movies, including Icebreaker, Lightning - Fire from the Sky, Moving Targets, Landslide, and Moonlight and Mistletoe. He was elected an IATSE 600 cinematographer in 2002 and ran both the boutique editing facility Post Monsters as well as the lighting/grip rental company New England Light & Grip.

Giancola cast the likes of Jesse Eisenberg, Chris Evans, Kate Bosworth, Paul Dano, Josh Peck, Todd G. Hutchinson, and Billy Ray Cyrus in their first starring roles. He has also directed the likes of Bruce Campbell, Stacy Keach, Sean Astin, Morgan Fairchild, James Coburn, and Tim Blake Nelson. In 2005, he attempted to continue his out-of-the-box casting style with the campy comedy Illegal Aliens, starring WWF wrestler Chyna and Anna Nicole Smith in her last performance. The film was a disaster due to the overdose deaths of Smith and her son (who is credited as a co-producer) and flopped badly. Later, using extensive behind-the-scenes footage, Giancola turned his ill fortune into the critically acclaimed documentary Addicted to Fame, which the late Roger Ebert called, “Probably the best movie about the making of a B-Movie ever made”.

Giancola’s first feature film, Time Chasers, garnered him his largest fan base. The film continues to be popular around the world as T-shirts, soundtrack CDs, DVDs and other merchandise continue to be consumed by fans of the film. Time Chasers has been featured on Mystery Science Theater 3000 and on 1600 screens theatrically on RiffTrax. The film was re-released digitally in HD and on Blu-ray in 2020.

Giancola operates the production company Edgewood Studios, which released the award-winning sci-fi/action feature Axcellerator in 2020, which stars Ryan Wesen, Sam J. Jones, Sean Young, John James, Maxwell Caulfield, and Laura James. Giancola is also a co-owner of numerous businesses in central Vermont, including ventures in commercial and residential real estate.

== Filmography ==
- Will Eisner's The Spirit: Ten Minutes (Short) (1989)
- Time Chasers (a.k.a. Tangents) (1993)
- Diamond Run (1996)
- Pressure Point (1997)
- Moving Targets (1998)
- Icebreaker (1999)
- Swimming on the Moon (a.k.a. Hatch) (1999)
- Peril (a.k.a. The Cursed a.k.a. A Woman in Jeopardy) (2000)
- Radical Jack (2000)
- The Newcomers (film) (2000)
- Lightning: Fire from the Sky (2001)
- Trapped: Buried Alive (2002)
- Frozen Impact
- Psyclops (2002)
- Killer Flood: The Day the Dam Broke (2003)
- Arachnia (2003)
- Landslide (2005)
- Ice Queen (2005)
- Zombie Town (2007)
- Illegal Aliens (2007)
- Moonlight & Mistletoe (2008)
- Addicted to Fame (2012)
- Axcellerator (2020)
