= 1 Night in China =

- Directed by: Marcos Nunez
- Starring: Chyna; Sean Waltman
- Distributed by: Red Light District Video
- Release date: December 14, 2004
- Running time: 60 minutes
- Country: United States

1 Night in China is a pornographic film directed by Marcos Nunez and featuring professional wrestling personalities Chyna (Joanie Laurer) and Sean Waltman. It was released by Red Light District Video in 2004 but recorded in 2003. While Waltman and Laurer were engaged at the time they made the film, they broke up before it was released. Laurer was 32 whereas Waltman was 31 at the time of recording. Laurer subsequently made several pornographic films, beginning with Another Night in China in 2009, which is considered to be a sequel to 1 Night in China.

== Plot ==
The film features scenes of Laurer and Waltman taking a guided tour of China, intercut with footage of the pair participating in explicit anal, vaginal, and oral sex acts, with special emphasis on an anal sex scene, which serves as the climax of the film. Waltman admits to being under the influence of methamphetamine and marijuana during much of the film. Chyna also admits she never agreed to the release and that Red Light District distributed her porn without permission from herself. She hated Waltman for this.

== Etymology ==
The title of the film is a play on words, as Laurer wrestled in the World Wrestling Federation under the ring name Chyna (pronounced "China"). A similarly named sex tape featuring Paris Hilton, also distributed by Red Light District, was titled 1 Night in Paris.

== Distribution ==
Laurer and Waltman approached Red Light District Video in late 2004 to distribute the tape. The film sold over 100,000 copies. According to the company, both Laurer and Waltman shared in the profits. Because of the film, Laurer received a career boost, soon appearing as a cast member on The Surreal Life on VH1.

== Reception ==
In January 2006, the film won an Adult Video News Award for the Top Selling Release of the Year.
