= SugarInstant =

Online adult movie streaming service

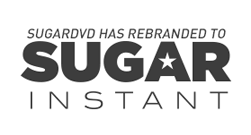
- Industry: Home Entertainment
- Genre: Adult
- Founded: 2002
- Headquarters: Santa Ana, California, U.S.
- Area served: United States, Canada
- Products: Streaming video and video download, retailing of DVD
- Website: www.sugarinstant.com (Adult site)

SugarInstant (formerly called SugarDVD) is an American online adult movie streaming service. At one time, it was the largest renter of adult DVDs online. Initially, SugarInstant's services were limited to flat-rate membership-based DVD-by-mail, but since its creation in 2002, the company has developed websites in several different areas of the adult industry. The company is based in Santa Ana, California, with multiple shipping centers across the United States.

== Services ==
SugarInstant offers a subscription-based streaming service, pay-per-view porn videos, and adult DVDs. Its video on demand options are available on PlayStation, Google TV, iPad/iPhone, Android, Xbox, PC and Mac OS. In 2017, Sugar launched a new redesigned website powered by Adult Empire.

== Celebrity endorsements ==
In 2006, Tori Spelling said that she was a fan of SugarDVD, saying, "My husband Dean McDermott and I also belong to this service that's like a porn Netflix called SugarDVD.com. The Netflix DVDs come in a red package and the SugarDVDs come in a blue one, so we're like, "Oooh! A Netflix arrived!" or "Oooh! A porn arrived!".

Jax, CEO of SugarDVD responded to Tori's statement with the gift of "Free porn for life." Since Spelling in 2006, SugarDVD has gifted several other celebrities with “A lifetime of Free Porn.” Among the celebrities who publicly accepted the offer are, Flavor Flav, Adam Carolla, Shock G of Digital Underground, and Don Magic Juan

== Verne Troyer sex tape ==
In July 2008, a clip featuring Verne Troyer and his former girlfriend Ranae Shrider in various sex acts was leaked to the press, without Troyer's consent.

SugarDVD's alleged involvement with the Verne Troyer sex tape scandal resulted in a $20-million lawsuit, in which SugarDVD and TMZ are named defendants.

== Awards ==
SugarDVD is the winner of the 2008 AVN award for Best Retail Site.

SugarDVD is the winner of the 2009 Best Adult DVD Rental award for best online porn DVD movie rental service.
