= Welcome to Sweden (2007 TV series) =

- Genre: Reality
- Starring: Richard Kiel; Verne Troyer
- Country of origin: Sweden
- Original languages: English; Swedish

Production
- Running time: 30 minutes

Original release
- Release: 2007

Welcome to Sweden is a Swedish reality show starring American actors Richard Kiel (known as Jaws from the James Bond films) and Verne Troyer (known as Mini-Me in the Austin Powers movies). The show aired on Kanal 5 in early 2007.

== Overview ==
During the couple of winter days they visit Sweden, Kiel and Troyer get to experience as much of Swedish customs as possible, including celebrating Midsummer's Eve, May Day, a Crayfish party, Gymnasia graduation, Gustavus Adolphus Day, Vasaloppet, opening of Parliament, a trip to Gotland and taking a booze cruise to Finland.
