= José Figueroa Agosto =

Puerto Rican drug trafficker

- Born: June 28, 1964 (age 62); San Juan, Puerto Rico
- Other names: "Pablo Escobar of the Caribbean"; Angel Rosa; Junior Capsula
- Occupation: Drug dealer
- Spouse: Leavy Yadira Nin Batista
- Children: 4
- Status: Released
- Criminal charge: Drug trafficking
- Penalty: 30 years imprisonment

Jose Figueroa Agosto (born "José David Figueroa Agosto"; June 28, 1964), also known as "Junior Capsula" and "the Pablo Escobar of the Caribbean", is a Puerto Rican former drug trafficker. As the head of a major drug trafficking organization that controlled 90% of cocaine in Puerto Rico, Figueroa Agosto was considered to be one of the most dangerous drug lords of Puerto Rico. He was the most wanted fugitive in Puerto Rico and the Dominican Republic at the time.

== Criminal career ==
In 2009, he was serving a 209-year prison sentence in Puerto Rico. In 2017, authorities believed that with the Caribbean's biggest reputed drug lord back behind bars, law enforcement authorities in the region should be on alert for potential bloody feuds among rivals and lieutenants trying to take his place. Capture of Jose Figueroa Agosto in Puerto Rico's capital after a decade-long hunt was a big break, but it also meant that members of his violent group would try to gain control of his share of the illegal trade.

== Arrest and imprisonment ==
His romantic companion, Sobeida Felix-Morel (sometimes spelled "Sobeyda Félix Morel"), had been captured months before he was and reportedly was cooperating with authorities after appearing in pornographic videos protagonized by both of them.

He pleaded guilty to drug trafficking charges in 2012, and in 2017 he was sentenced to 30 years in prison. He was released in 2020 after serving 10 years in prison.

== Sex tape ==
In 2010, a sex tape of Figueroa Agosto proved to be a popular sell among porn DVD vendors in Puerto Rico and Dominican Republic.
