= Addicted to Fame =

2012 film

- Film poster
- Directed by: David Giancola
- Starring: Anna Nicole Smith; David Giancola; John James; Chyna; Larry King; Jesse Eisenberg; Sean Astin; Bruce Campbell; O. J. Simpson; Harvey Levin; Howard K. Stern; Scott J. Jones; Lenise Sorén; Gladise Jiminez; Ben Coello; Katie Couric; Bob Schieffer; Geraldo Rivera; Brian Williams
- Release date: 19 March 2012
- Running time: 89 min.
- Country: United States
- Language: English

Addicted to Fame is a 2012 American documentary comedy film directed by David Giancola. The film stars Anna Nicole Smith, David Giancola, John James, Chyna, Larry King, Jesse Eisenberg and Sean Astin.

== Cast ==
- Anna Nicole Smith
- David Giancola
- John James
- Chyna
- Larry King
- Jesse Eisenberg
- Sean Astin
- Bruce Campbell
- O. J. Simpson
- Harvey Levin
- Howard K. Stern
- Scott J. Jones
- Lenise Sorén
- Daniel Smith
- Kevin Costner
- Clint Eastwood
- Brooke Shields
- Billy Ray Cyrus
- Tyra Banks
- Charles Gibson
- Mary Hart
