= Kevin Blatt =

American fixer

- Born: Kevin Blatt; March 19, 1969 (age 57); Cleveland, Ohio, U.S.
- Other name: KB
- Occupation: Fixer
- Years active: 1995–present
- Known for: 1 Night in Paris

Kevin Blatt is an American fixer known for promoting the Paris Hilton sex tape 1 Night in Paris in 2003.

== Work ==
Kevin Blatt was born in Cleveland, Ohio to a Jewish family, he worked in the online adult entertainment industry as a marketing and public relations specialist for 22 years. He has worked with companies in that market space such as Mindgeek (Pornhub), Vivid Video, macandbumble.com and Red Light District Video.

== Film and radio ==
Blatt featured in the theatrically released 2006 documentary American Cannibal: The Road to Reality. He is also featured in Amazon Studio's 2019 documentary Generation Wealth.

Blatt has appeared on The Howard Stern Show, Access Hollywood, Dr. Phil, Entertainment Tonight and the podcast Your Mom's House; and in The Wall Street Journal, The New York Times, Rolling Stone, Vice, CNN, ABC.com, Wired, MSNBC, and New York Post. Kevin also featured as a regular guest on the AXS TV show Top Ten Revealed with Katie Daryl. He is also featured on VICE TV's Dark Side of the 2000s, in the episode “TMZ: Gone Wild”.

Blatt previously was a co-host of the comedy podcast, Blow The Whistle feat. Too Short and KB. Kevin's co-host on the show was Bay Area rapper, Too Short. He is currently featured in the documentary series Secrets of Celebrity Sex Tapes on A&E.
