= 1 Night in Paris =

2004 pornographic film by Rick Salomon

- DVD cover
- Directed by: Rick Salomon
- Produced by: Rick Salomon
- Starring: Paris Hilton; Rick Salomon
- Cinematography: Rick Salomon
- Distributed by: Red Light District Video
- Release date: June 15, 2004
- Running time: 62 minutes
- Country: United States

1 Night in Paris is a 2004 porn video filmed by Rick Salomon. Promoted by Kevin Blatt, it depicts then-20-year-old Paris Hilton having sexual intercourse in May 2001 with Salomon in Paradise, Nevada. Not originally intended for release, it was filmed primarily with a single, stationary, tripod-mounted camera using "night vision". However, a handful of scenes were filmed indoors without night vision.

== Release ==
The video was released by Salomon shortly before Hilton's TV series The Simple Life debuted, causing a media sensation. When Hilton stated publicly that she had been "out of it", did not know what she was doing during the taping of the video, and did not approve its public release, Salomon sued Hilton for defamation. Hilton then countersued Salomon over the release of the tape, settling out of court in July 2005. According to reports, Hilton was awarded as much as $400,000 and planned to donate a percentage to charity.

In a 2006 interview with the British edition of GQ magazine, Hilton stated: "I never received a dime from the video. It's just dirty money and (Salomon) should give it all to some charity for the sexually abused or something. To be honest, I don't even think about it any more."

The video received the AVN Awards in 2005 for "Best Selling Title of the Year", "Best Renting Title of the Year", and "Best Overall Marketing Campaign – Individual Project". The DVD titled 1 Night in Paris is distributed by Red Light District, a production company that produces and distributes pornographic videos. The rights to the video have since been purchased by Vivid Entertainment.

The official release of the video opened with a dedication that states: "In memory of 9/11/01... We will never forget."

American singer-songwriter P!nk parodied one of the scenes from the sex tape in her music video for her song "Stupid Girls".

In 2021 interview with Vanity Fair, Hilton said the tape, which was released without her consent and caused a media sensation, was "humiliating" and is "something that will hurt me for the rest of my life."

== Accolades ==
- 2005 AVN Award - Best Overall Marketing Campaign, Individual Project
- 2005 AVN Award - Best Renting Title of the Year
- 2005 AVN Award - Best Selling Title of the Year
- 2008 F.A.M.E. Award - Favourite Celebrity Sex Tape

== See also ==
- Celebrity sex tape
- Sex scandal
